= Sayem ministry =

1975 interim government of Bangladesh

- 6th & 7th Council of Ministers and 1st Council of Advisers of the People’s Republic of Bangladesh
- 6 November 1975–21 April 1977
- Date formed: 6 November 1975
- Date dissolved: 21 April 1977

People and organisations
- President: Abu Sadat Mohammad Sayem
- President's history: ASM Sayem; Former Chief Justice of Bangladesh (1972–75)
- No. of ministers: 20
- Member parties: Military; Independent; Jatiyatabadi Ganatantrik Dal
- Status in legislature: Dissolved

History
- Election: -
- Outgoing election: 1978 (presidential)
- Predecessor: Mostaq
- Successor: Zia

The Sayem ministry led what eventually became the first interim government in independent Bangladesh and an unofficial model for future interim governments. It was formed on 8 November 1975, following the assassination of Major General Khaled Mosharraf on 7 November amid a nationwide soldier and public uprising against his 3 November coup d'état. After a three-day coup with support of some high-ranking officers and his Dhaka Brigade, Mosharraf had forced Khondaker Mostaq Ahmad, who, following the 15 August coup that assassinated the founding president Sheikh Mujibur Rahman, replaced him as President of Bangladesh with support of the mid-ranking assassin officers, to resign. Chief Justice Sayem, with the constitutional requirement for the direct election of the president and role of the vice-president as acting president suspended by Mostaq under a martial law proclamation, had been installed in his place. With Mosharraf's death, the responsibility of CMLA (Chief Martial Law Administrator) fell on Sayem.

Following the first-ever dissolution of the Jatiya Sangsad on 7 November, the cabinet was initially set up as a military junta with the recently promoted armed forces chiefs, notably the chief of army staff Ziaur Rahman, who had been usurped and put under house arrest by Mosharraf during the coup, as the CMLA's deputies.

At Bangabhaban on 26 November 1975, the president administered oath to a newly formed council of advisers de facto headed by the junta. He promised a general election in February 1977 in a presidential speech addressed to the nation, but in November 1976, with the country in a dire situation with no stability and security, indefinitely postponed it and relinquished his CMLA duty with Zia nominated to succeed. 5 months later on 21 April 1977, when Sayem retired on health grounds, in the absence of a vice-president in office, Zia decided to act as president. Forty days later, he organised a nationwide presidential confidence referendum to legitimise his presidency. In June, the President's special assistant Abdus Sattar was promoted to the office of vice-president and on 9 December, the council of advisers was reorganised with three dismissals and seven new appointments.

After coming to power, Zia immediately moved to restore law and order in the country by strengthening the police force, practically doubling its size and arranging for their proper training, as well as order in the armed forces and withdrew the ban on the newspapers inaugurating the free flow of news by making the information media free and without government interference. An ordinance allowing political parties to engage in open politics was promulgated reversing the ban imposed on them by Mujibur Rahman months prior to his assassination. Zia organised his own party in February 1978 called the Jatiyotabadi Gonotantrik Dol ("Nationalist Democratic Party"), or JaGoDol for short, and in the presidential election – the first direct election – that year, his candidacy was supported by his and five other parties of the nationalist "Jatiyatabadi Front". He achieved a landslide victory against his wartime superior, retired commander-in-chief MAG Osmani, whose candidacy was supported by the then-dominant Awami League and five other parties of the socialist "Ganatantrik Oikkya Jote ("Alliance of Democratic Unity")".

The cabinet was dissolved on 29 June 1978, once Zia formed his provisional Council of Ministers before the pending general election scheduled to be held next year.

== Background ==
=== 15 August 1975 coup d'état ===
A military coup was launched in Bangladesh on August 15, 1975, by mid-ranking army officers in order to assassinate President Sheikh Mujibur Rahman. Sheikh Mujibur Rahman, also known as Bangabandhu (lit. 'Friend of Bengal') or Mujib, was the country's founding president, but post-independence his administration grew corrupt and reportedly 'increasingly authoritarian' until he formed a 'one-party state' led by the socialist Bangladesh Krishak Sramik Awami League. Mujib was killed during the coup, along with many of his family members who were living in Bangladesh at the time, but he was survived by his two then-expat daughters, one of whom was future prime minister Sheikh Hasina. The officers were led by Capt. Abdul Majed, Major Syed Faruque Rahman, Major Khandaker Abdur Rashid and Major Shariful Haque Dalim.

Khondaker Mostaq Ahmad, one of Mujib's close associates and cabinet ministers, took control of the government immediately following the coup with support of the officers and declared himself President of Bangladesh. Under martial law, he made a proclamation on 20 August to amend the constitution to omit the provision for the legal basis for the one-party system. He reportedly praised the assassin officers, calling them "Children of the Sun", and proclaimed the Indemnity Ordinance, which granted them immunity from prosecution. They were all later toppled by a counter-coup on 3 November 1975.

=== 3 November counter coup ===
The 3 November 1975 Bangladeshi coup d'état was organised by Brig. Khaled Mosharraf against President Khondaker Mostaq Ahmad to remove him from the presidency and the assassins of Sheikh Mujibur Rahman from power: Capt. Abdul Majed, Maj. Syed Faruque Rahman, Maj. Khandaker Abdur Rashid and Maj. Shariful Haque Dalim. The coup resulted in a return of Mujibist forces in Bangladeshi politics for a short time.

The coup was the result of a power struggle between the regime of Mostaq Ahmed and the mid-ranking officers backing him, Majed, Faruque, Rashid and Dalim, and Mosharraf and the high-ranking officers supporting him, Col. Shafaat Jamil, Lt. Col. Abu Taher Mohammad Haider and Col. Khondkar Nazmul Huda. The high-ranking officers were worried about army discipline with "junior mutinous officers issuing orders from the presidential palace". With the coup, Mosharraf promoted himself to the rank of major general and the post of Chief of Army Staff after placing Maj. Gen. Ziaur Rahman under house arrest while the mid-ranking officers went on exile, as was agreed upon between the belligerents. The coup lasted 3 days, after which Abu Sadat Mohammad Sayem was installed as President while Mosharraf served as the Chief Martial Law Administrator. The coup resulted in the death of four national leaders of Bangladesh: Syed Nazrul Islam, former vice president and acting president of Bangladesh, Tajuddin Ahmad, former prime minister of Bangladesh, Muhammad Mansur Ali, former prime minister of Bangladesh, and Abul Hasnat Muhammad Qamaruzzaman, former home minister of Bangladesh.

=== 7 November revolution ===
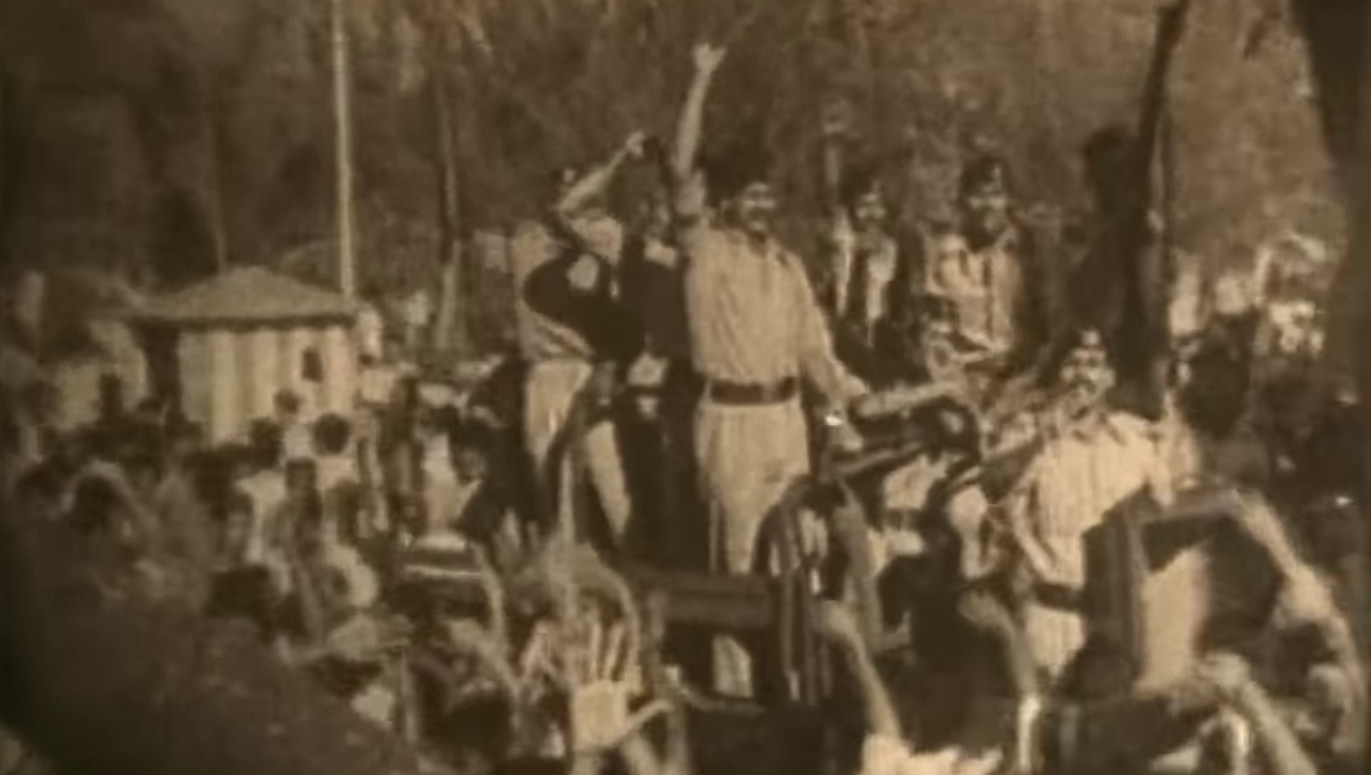
Soldiers being received by the public in 7 November 1975

National Revolution and Solidarity Day (Bengali: জাতীয় বিপ্লব ও সংহতি দিবস) is a commemorative public holiday celebrated in Bangladesh on 7 November to commemorate the 7 November 1975 Bangladeshi coup d'état (Sipahi–Janata Revolution) by regular army soldiers and the common masses that showed solidarity with them.

In the backdrop of the 15 August coup that resulted in the assassination of Sheikh Mujibur Rahman, a series of coups and counter-coups ended with the 3 November coup to remove from power Mujib's replacement President Khondaker Mostaq Ahmad, organised by the pro-Mujib Brig. Gen. Khaled Mosharraf, who was assassinated in the aftermath. Meanwhile, the soldiers proceeded to release Maj. Gen. Ziaur Rahman, who was put under house arrest at the inception of the coup by Mosharraf. The uprising, though organised by Lt. Col. (retd.) Abu Taher and his clandestine revolutionary socialist group of soldier mutineers, the Biplobi Shainik Sangstha (BSS), to unsuccessfully create a socialist revolution, resulted in Zia's ascension to power.

The day marks the end of the political turmoil and series of coups and counter-coups that occurred after the assassination of Mujibur Rahman, the founding President of Bangladesh, on 15 August 1975.

== First cabinet ==
The following lists is the first cabinet of the President Sayem. It was dissolved on 26 November 1975.

Cabinet
Portfolio	Minister	Took office	Left office
President and Chief Martial Law Administrator and also in-charge of: Presidential Secretariat (Presidential Division); Cabinet Secretariat (Cabinet Division, O&M Division); Ministry of Defence; Ministry of Foreign Affairs; Ministry of Law, Justice and Parliamentary Affairs; Ministry of Planning	Abu Sadat Mohammad Sayem	6 November 1975	21 April 1977
Deputy Chief Martial Law Administrator and also in-charge of: Chief of Army Staff; Ministry of Finance; Ministry of Home Affairs; Ministry of Industries; Ministry of Commerce and Foreign Trade; Ministry of Textiles & Jute; Ministry of Information and Broadcasting; Ministry of Education, STR and Atomic Energy	Major General Ziaur Rahman, BU, psc	10 November 1975	26 September 1976
Deputy Chief Martial Law Administrator and also in-charge of: Chief of Naval Staff; Ministry of Ports, Shipping and Inland Water Transport; Ministry of Flood Control, Water Resources and Energy; Ministry of Forests, Fisheries and Livestock; Ministry of Communications; Ministry of Labor, Social Welfare, Cultural Affairs and Sports; Ministry of Land Administration and Land Reforms	Commodore Musharraf Husain Khan, psn, BN	8 November 1975	9 December 1977
Deputy Chief Martial Law Administrator and also in-charge of: Chief of Air Staff; Ministry of Aviation and Tourism; Ministry of Petroleum; Ministry of Food; Ministry of Posts, Telecommunications and Telegraphs; Ministry of and Public Works; Ministry of Health and Family Planning; Ministry of Agriculture; Ministry of Relief and Rehabilitation; Ministry of Local Government, Rural Development and Co-operatives	Air Vice Marshal Muhammad Ghulam Tawab, SJ, SBt, PSA, BAF	8 November 1975	9 May 1976

== Second Cabinet ==
=== List of advisers ===
The following lists is the advisers of the interim government and the second cabinet of the President Sayem. This cabinet was dissolved after Major General Ziaur Rahman became president on 21 April 1977.

Cabinet
Portfolio	Minister	Took office	Left office
President and also in-charge of: Presidential Secretariat; Cabinet Secretariat; Adviser for Defence; Adviser for Foreign Affairs; Adviser for Law, Justice and Parliamentary Affairs	Abu Sadat Mohammad Sayem	26 November 1975	21 April 1977
Chief Martial Law Administrator and also in-charge of: Chief Martial Law Administrator's Secretariat	Abu Sadat Mohammad Sayem	26 November 1975	19 November 1976
Chief Martial Law Administrator and also in-charge of: Chief Martial Law Administrator's Secretariat	Major General Ziaur Rahman, BU, psc	19 November 1976	9 April 1979
Deputy Chief Martial Law Administrator	Major General Ziaur Rahman, BU, psc	26 November 1975	19 November 1976
Deputy Chief Martial Law Administrator	Commodore Musharraf Husain Khan, psn, BN	26 November 1975	9 December 1977
Deputy Chief Martial Law Administrator	Air Vice Marshal Muhammad Ghulam Tawab, SJ, SBt, PSA, BAF	26 November 1975	3 May 1976
Deputy Chief Martial Law Administrator	Air Vice Marshal Khademul Bashar, BU, psc	3 May 1976	6 September 1976
Deputy Chief Martial Law Administrator	Air Commodore Abdul Gaffar Mahumd, ORS, SP, TBt	6 September 1976	9 December 1977
Special Adviser to the President and also in-charge of Ministry of Law and Parliamentary Affairs	Justice Abdus Sattar	27 November 1975	3 June 1977
Adviser for Education	Abul Fazal	26 November 1975	22 June 1977
Adviser for Labor, Social Welfare, Cultural Affairs and Sports	Abul Fazal	26 November 1975	24 January 1977
Adviser for Jute	Kazi Anwarul Haque	26 November 1975	5 August 1977
Adviser for Communication: (Roads, Highways, Road transport and Railways Division)	Kazi Anwarul Haque	26 November 1975	5 August 1977
Adviser for Land Administration and Land Reforms	Kazi Anwarul Haque	26 November 1975	9 December 1977
Adviser for Public Works and Urban Development	Mohammad Abdul Rashid	26 November 1975	29 June 1978
Adviser for Local Government, Rural Development and Co-operatives	Mohammad Abdul Rashid	26 November 1975	24 January 1976
Adviser for Planning	Mirza Nurul Huda	26 November 1975	29 June 1978
Adviser for Industries	Mirza Nurul Huda	26 November 1975	24 January 1976
Adviser for Industries	A. K. M. Hafizuddin	24 January 1976	10 July 1977
Adviser for Commerce and Foreign Trade	Mirza Nurul Huda	4 December 1975	27 December 1977
Adviser for Health, Family Planning and Population Control	Muhammad Ibrahim	4 December 1975	8 December 1977
Adviser for Relief and Rehabilitation	Mohammad Abdul Rashid	26 November 1975	4 December 1975
Adviser for Relief and Rehabilitation	Benita Roy	4 December 1975	29 June 1978
Adviser for Manpower Development, Labour and Social Welfare	Colonel (retd.) Masudul Haque	18 June 1976	8 December 1977
Adviser for Agriculture and Forest	Mirza Nurul Huda	26 November 1975	4 December 1975
Adviser for Agriculture and Forest	Abu Sadat Mohammad Sayem	4 December 1975	24 January 1976
Adviser for Agriculture and Forest	Mirza Nurul Huda	24 January 1976	18 June 1976
Adviser for Agriculture and Forest	A. K. M. Azizul Haque	18 June 1976	29 June 1978
Adviser for Petroleum	Air Vice Marshal Muhammad Ghulam Tawab, SJ, SBt	26 November 1975	3 May 1976
Adviser for Petroleum	Air Vice Marshal Khademul Bashar, BU, psc	3 May 1976	6 September 1976
Adviser for Petroleum	Air Commodore Abdul Gaffar Mahumd, ORS, SP, TBt	6 September 1976	9 December 1977
Adviser for Food	Air Vice Marshal Muhammad Ghulam Tawab, SJ, SBt, PSA, BAF	26 November 1975	3 May 1976
Adviser for Food	Air Vice Marshal Khademul Bashar, BU, psc	3 May 1976	6 September 1976
Adviser for Food	Air Commodore Abdul Gaffar Mahumd, ORS, SP, TBt	6 September 1976	9 December 1977
Adviser for Civil Aviation and Tourism	Air Vice Marshal Muhammad Ghulam Tawab, SJ, SBt, PSA, BAF	26 November 1975	3 May 1976
Adviser for Civil Aviation and Tourism	Air Vice Marshal Khademul Bashar, BU, psc	3 May 1976	6 September 1976
Adviser for Civil Aviation and Tourism	Air Commodore Abdul Gaffar Mahumd, ORS, SP, TBt	6 September 1976	9 December 1977
Adviser for Information and Broadcasting	Akbar Kabir	18 September 1976	12 October 1977
Adviser for Commerce	Mohammad Saifur Rahman	27 December 1976	29 June 1978
Adviser for Foreign Affairs	Abu Sadat Mohammad Sayem	26 November 1975	25 March 1977
Adviser for Foreign Affairs	Muhammad Shamsul Huq	25 March 1977	29 June 1978
Adviser for Ports, Shipping and Inland Water Transport	Commodore Musharraf Husain Khan, psn, BN	26 November 1975	9 December 1977
Adviser for Fisheries and Animal Husbandry	Commodore Musharraf Husain Khan, psn, BN	26 November 1975	9 December 1977
Adviser for Flood Control, Water Resources and Power,	Commodore Musharraf Husain Khan, psn, BN	8 November 1975	9 December 1977
Adviser for Communications	Commodore Musharraf Husain Khan, psn, BN	8 November 1975	9 December 1977

== See also ==
- Shahabuddin Ahmed ministry
- Yunus ministry
- Assassination of Sheikh Mujibur Rahman
- 3 November 1975 Bangladeshi coup d'état
- 7 November 1975 Bangladeshi coup d'état
- National Revolution and Solidarity Day
- Elections in Bangladesh
- List of cabinets of Bangladesh
- Government of Bangladesh
- Politics of Bangladesh
