= 1972–1975 Bangladesh insurgency =

Left-wing insurgency after the independence of Bangladesh

Bangladesh insurgency
- Part of the Cold War in Asia
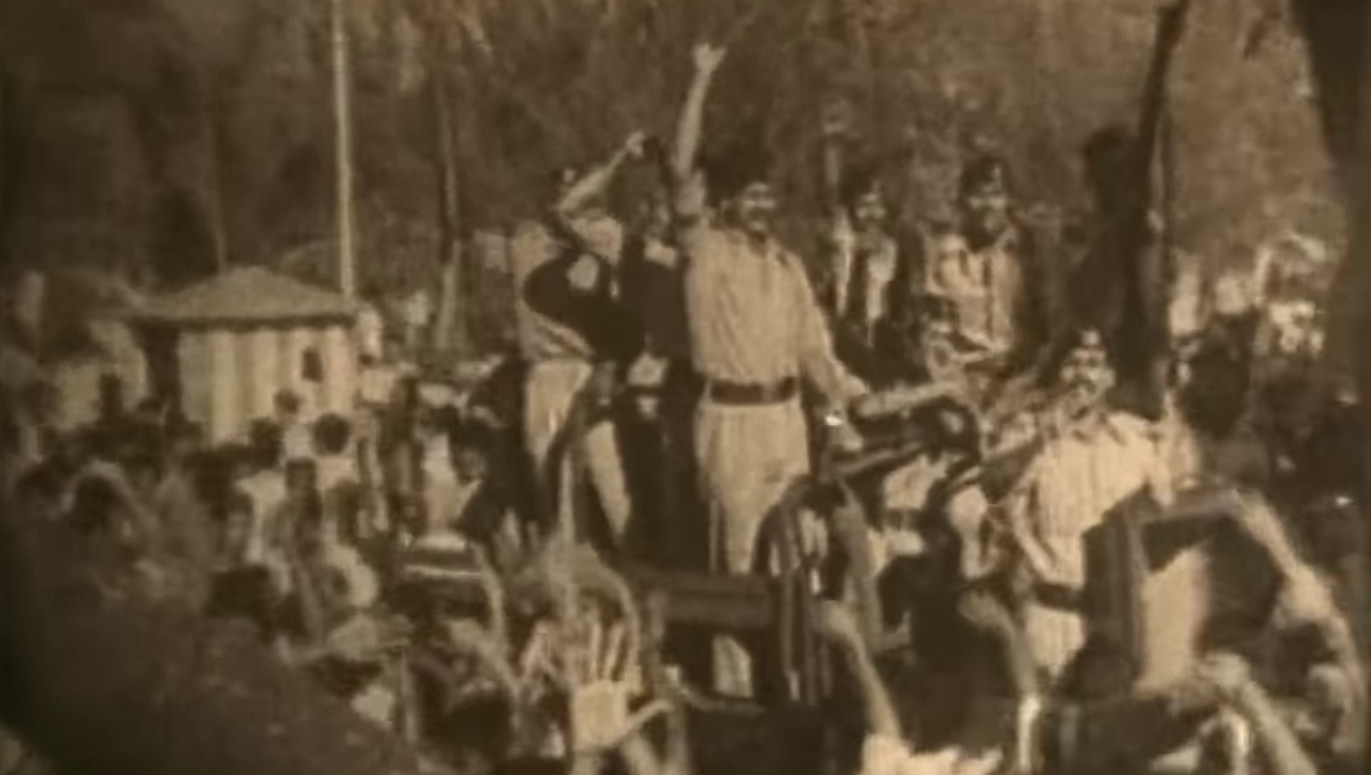
- Soldiers of the Biplobi Shainik Sangstha being received by the public after the Sipahi–Janata Revolution on 7 November 1975
Date	1 February 1972 – 24 November 1975 (3 years, 9 months and 23 days)
Location	Bangladesh
Result	Insurgency largely subdued: One-party rule established by the Mujib regime; Assassination of Sheikh Mujibur Rahman; Three consecutive coups in 1975; Ziaur Rahman's ascension to power; Kader Siddique's insurgency

Belligerents
Government of Bangladesh; Awami League/BAKSAL (until 3 Nov 1975); Chhatra League; Sramik League	Socialist insurgents: Jatiya Samajtantrik Dal; JASAD Chhatra League; Maoist insurgents: Purba Banglar Sarbahara Party; Independent trade unionists (Note: Non-Sramik League aligned trade unionists were considered enemies by the BAKSAL regime)

Commanders and leaders
(Bangladesh) Sheikh Mujibur Rahman X; (Bangladesh) Khondaker Mostaq Ahmed (surrendered) (POW); (Bangladesh) Abu Sadat Mohammad Sayem; K. M. Shafiullah; Ziaur Rahman; Khaled Mosharraf X; A. N. M. Nuruzzaman	Abu Taher (executed) Siraj Sikder †

Units involved
Bangladesh Army; Jatiya Rakkhi Bahini; Bangladesh Police; Lal Bahini	Gonobahini; Biplobi Shainik Sangstha; Purba Banglar Jatiya Mukti Front

Strength
16,000 JRB personnel (1975)	N/A

Casualties and losses
3,000 Awami League members killed; 4 members of parliament killed; 65% of military officers lose control of their troops during the Sipahi–Janata Revolution	JASAD: 6,000 killed (as per JASAD); 3,000+ killed (as per Anthony Mascarenhas); At least one executed; 33 BSS soldiers detained after the Sipahi–Janata Revolution; PBSP: Unknown, at least one killed; 2,000+ workers killed during the Mongla Port massacre 2,035 unspecified political opponents killed between 1972 and April 1973
- Total 2,000 – 4,000+ combatants/activists killed

The 1972–1975 Bangladesh insurgency refers to the period following the independence of Bangladesh, when factions opposing the government of Sheikh Mujibur Rahman, including the left-wing Gonobahini, and the Purba Banglar Sarbahara Party fought an armed conflict against the government of Bangladesh between 1972 and 1975.

The Sheikh Mujib government responded by forming the Jatiya Rakkhi Bahini, which began a crackdown on the general populace. The force became involved in the numerous charges of human rights abuse including political killings, shooting by death squads, and rape. The insurgency was one of the main reasons for the fall of Sheikh Mujib.

== Background ==
In 1972, Jatiyo Samajtantrik Dal was formed when it split from Bangladesh Chhatra League, the student wing of the Bangladesh Awami League, under the leadership of Serajul Alam Khan, M. A. Jalil, ASM Abdur Rab and Shahjahan Siraj. Its armed wing, Gonobahini, led by Colonel Abu Taher and Hasanul Haq Inu, began an armed campaign against the government of Sheikh Mujibur Rahman in order to establish scientific socialism and a Marxist state.

== Political killings ==
Political killings of 1972–74
- Part of the 1972–1975 Bangladesh insurgency
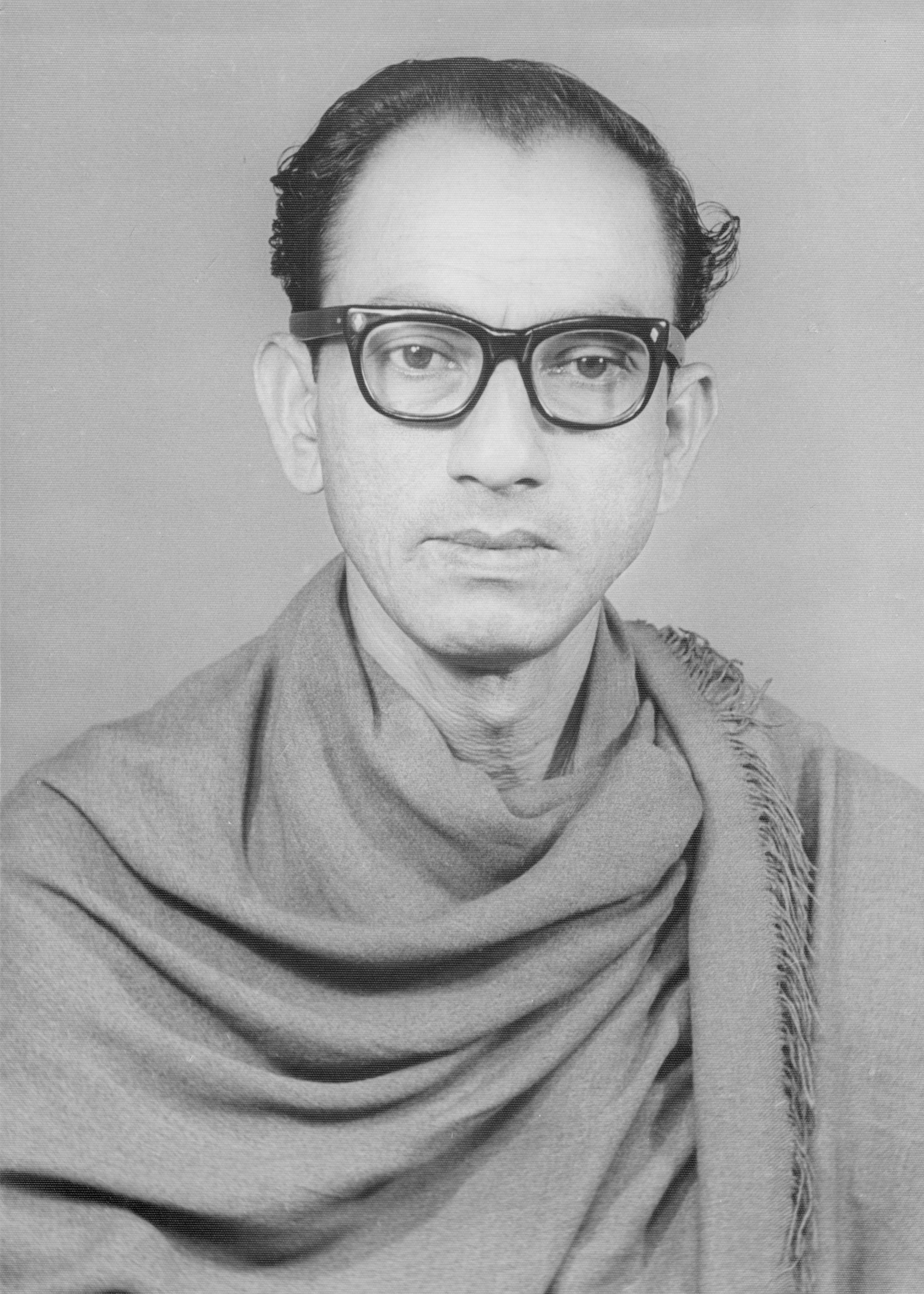
- Mosharraf Hossain, one of the many people killed during the killings
- Date: February 1, 1972 – December 16, 1974
- Type: Mass killing, murder, extrajudicial killing, state terrorism, domestic terrorism, dirty war, forced disappearance
- Motive: To destroy the opposition
- Perpetrators: Government: Jatiya Rakkhi Bahini; Bangladesh Police; Opposition: Gonobahini
- Outcome: Both the opposition and government suffer casualties; Political killings continue; State of emergency is declared; The autocratic BaKSAL is formed
- Deaths: 5,039 – 30,000

Anthony Mascarenhas states that by the end of 1973, the number of politically motivated murders in Bangladesh after independence was over 2000. The victims included some members of parliament and many of the murders were resulted of intra-party conflicts within the Awami League. The Gonobahini also killed numerous Bangladesh Chhatra League and Awami League members.

On the other hand, Maoists such as Siraj Sikder of the Purba Banglar Sarbahara Party and Abdul Haq began attacking the government and people whom they considered "class enemies".

The government responded by forming the Jatiya Rakkhi Bahini. Anthony Mascarenhas claimed that within three years, deaths of mostly Jatiyo Samajtantrik Dal members reached 30,000, all of which were killed by the Jatiya Rakkhi Bahini. Journalists like Ahmed Musa suggest roughly 10,000–30,000 were killed, while JSD claims the killings were as high as 60,000.

== End of insurgency ==
After being de facto ruler of the nation, Ziaur Rahman realized that the disorder set off by the soldiers' mutiny had to be suppressed firmly if discipline was to be restored in the army. Ziaur Rahman declared martial law, cracked down on the Jatiyo Samajtantrik Dal, Abu Taher was sentenced to death and other party figures had various terms of imprisonment slapped on them.

== Legacy ==
Human Rights Watch states that institutionalized violence committed by the Jatiya Rakkhi Bahini during the insurgency, established the culture of impunity and widespread prevalence of abuses by security forces in independent Bangladesh. Commentators have called the period a "dark chapter of Bangladesh's history."
