= Nawazesh Uddin =

Bangladesh army officer (1945–1981)

- Born: 24 July 1945; Tipperah, Bengal, British India
- Died: 23 September 1981 (aged 36); Comilla Central Jail, Chittagong, Bangladesh
- Military career
- Allegiance: Bangladesh; Pakistan (before 1971)
- Branch: Bangladesh Army; Pakistan Army
- Service years: 1966–1981
- Rank: Colonel
- Units: Baloch Regiment; East Bengal Regiment
- Commands: Sub Sector Commander of Sector - VI; CO of 10th East Bengal Regiment; Commandant of East Bengal Regimental Centre
- Known for: Assassination of Ziaur Rahman
- Conflicts: Bangladesh Liberation War; 7 November 1975 Bangladeshi coup d'état

Nawazesh Uddin (24 July 1945 – 23 September 1981) was a Bangladeshi army officer who was executed for his involvement in the assassination of Ziaur Rahman.

== Career ==
=== Bangladesh Liberation War ===
In 1959, Nawazesh joined the Pakistan Army as a student apprentice and was commissioned in the 22nd Baluch Regiment in Sialkot, Punjab, in 1966. He was a captain and was stationed in Rangpur when the 1971 Bangladesh Liberation War began. On 24 April 1971, the prime minister of the government in exile, Tajuddin Ahmed, stated that Nawazesh and his troops revolted against Pakistan.

During the liberation war, Nawazesh was a sub-sector commander in sector 6, in Sahebganj.

=== 7 November 1975 Coup ===
On 3 November 1975, General Khaled Mosharraf, Lieutenant Colonel A.T.M. Haider, and Colonel Nazmul Huda ousted the Mostaq Ahmed regime and placed Ziaur Rahman under house arrest. Before Zia was arrested, he called Lt. Colonel (retired) Abu Taher and urged him to do something. In response, Taher and his clandestine group within the army, the Biplobi Shainik Sangstha, launched the 7 November coup to free Zia from imprisonment.

At the time, Nawazesh was the commanding officer of the 10 Bengal Regiment. He received a phone call from Zia, who instructed Nawazesh to ensure the safety of Khaled Mosharraf and his companions. Nawazesh climbed on top of a jeep and ordered his troops not to harm Khaled Mosharraf. However, his troops were defiant and threatened to kill him if he tried to stop them.

Fearing for his life, Nawazesh did nothing to stop Captain Jalil and Captain Asad, who ordered their troops to kill Khaled Mosharraf, A.T.M. Haider, and Nazmul Huda. After these officers were killed, Nawazesh informed Zia of the incident, stating, "I am sorry sir, situation got out of hand".

Zia asked Nawazesh to preserve the bodies of Khaled Mosharraf, A.T.M. Haider, and Nazmul Huda.

== Death ==
Following the assassination of Ziaur Rahman on 30 May 1981, a number of army officers were arrested for their alleged involvement, including Nawazesh. While he was detained, Nawazesh was tortured. He was court-martialed and executed on 23 September 1981 in Comilla Prison. In his last letter to his wife, he wrote:

Dear Momy (Momtaz Nawazesh) Take hundreds of millions of affection, love and caresses from me. Ask everybody to pray for me so that Allah sends me to Heaven.

I am requesting you all to bury my body on the eastern side of my father's shrine.

My last entreaty to Allah is to keep you all happy. Give my unlimited affection and blessings to Rony, Rosy, Happy and Babu. I will always pray for you. Blessings and greeting to you all.

Yours, Nawazesh

He was buried in his birthplace, Muradpur, Comilla.
