= National Revolution and Solidarity Day =

National day in Bangladesh

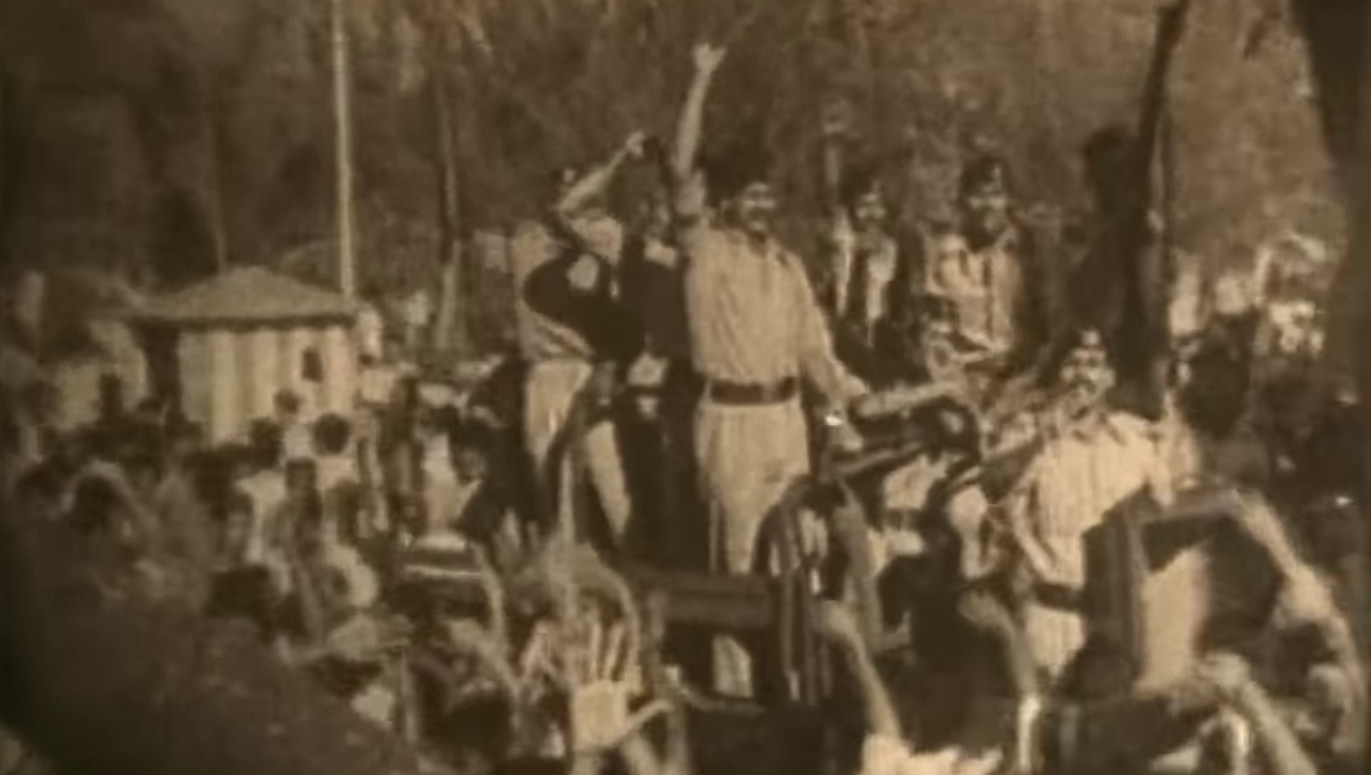
- Soldiers being received by the public in 7 November 1975
- Official name: জাতীয় বিপ্লব ও সংহতি দিবস
- Observed by: Bangladesh
- Type: Patriotic
- Significance: Commemorates the united soldier and public uprising against the 3 November 1975 Bangladeshi coup d'état
- Observances: Political rallies, wreath-laying, prayers, conferences, photography exhibitions
- Date: 7 November
- Frequency: Annual
- First time: 1976; 50 years ago; As national holiday: 1991; 35 years ago; 2026; 0 years ago (reinstated)
- Related to: 7 November 1975 Bangladeshi coup d'état; Assassination of Khaled Mosharraf

National Revolution and Solidarity Day (Bengali: জাতীয় বিপ্লব ও সংহতি দিবস) is a commemorative public holiday celebrated in Bangladesh on 7 November to commemorate the 7 November 1975 Bangladeshi coup d'état (Sipahi–Janata Revolution) by regular army soldiers and the common masses that showed solidarity with them.

In the backdrop of the 15 August coup that resulted in the assassination of Sheikh Mujibur Rahman, a series of coups and counter-coups ended with the 3 November coup to remove from power Mujib's replacement President Khondaker Mostaq Ahmad, organised by the pro-Mujib Brig. Gen. Khaled Mosharraf, who was assassinated in the aftermath. Meanwhile, the soldiers proceeded to release Maj. Gen. Ziaur Rahman, who was put under house arrest at the inception of the coup by Mosharraf. The uprising, though organised by Lt. Col. (retd.) Abu Taher and his clandestine revolutionary socialist group of soldier mutineers, the Biplobi Shainik Sangstha (BSS), to unsuccessfully create a socialist revolution, resulted in Zia's ascension to power.

The day marks the end of the political turmoil and series of coups and counter-coups that occurred after the assassination of Mujibur Rahman, the founding President of Bangladesh, on 15 August 1975.

== Observance ==
The Bangladesh Nationalist Party (BNP), Bangladesh Jamaat-e-Islami, Liberal Democratic Party and several other parties commemorate the day and regard the coup as a "civil–military uprising". Taher's party, Jatiya Samajtantrik Dal, views the day similarly but observes it as the "Sepoy-People's Uprising Day". On the contrary, the Awami League views it negatively and considers it neither a revolutionary nor a solidarity day, calling it the "Freedom Fighters Killing Day".

7 November was a national holiday in Bangladesh during the military government of Lt. Gen. Hussain Muhammad Ershad and prime minister Khaleda Zia's ministries. In November 2007, the military-backed caretaker government of Fakhruddin Ahmed dismissed the holiday. The holiday was reinstated by the Tarique Rahman-led BNP government in 2026.

== See also ==
- Revolution Day in other countries
- Biplobi Shainik Sangstha (BSS)
- Military coups in Bangladesh
- Anti-imperialism solidarity day
- National Mourning Day (Bangladesh), another former public holiday in Bangladesh
