= 1975 Bangladeshi coup d'état =

1975 Bangladeshi coup d'état may refer to:

- 15 August 1975 Bangladeshi coup d'état, which deposed Sheikh Mujibur Rahman
- 3 November 1975 Bangladeshi coup d'état, which deposed Khondaker Mostaq Ahmad
- 7 November 1975 Bangladeshi coup d'état, which deposed Khaled Mosharraf
