= Gonobahini =

Armed Wing of the Jatiya Samajtantrik Dal

National Socialist Party – People's Army
- জাতীয় সমাজতান্ত্রিক দল – গণবাহিনী
- Other name: JGB; JaSaD Gonobahini
- Commander: Lt. Col. Abu Taher; Hasanul Haq Inu
- Dates active: 1972–75
- Dissolved: 1976
- Country: Bangladesh
- Allegiance: Jatiya Samajtantrik Dal
- Ideology: Vanguardism; Revolutionary socialism Scientific socialism Left-wing nationalism Anti-Mujibism
- Political position: Left-wing to far-left

Jatiya Samajtantrik Dal – Gonobahini (JGB; Bengali: জাতীয় সমাজতান্ত্রিক দল – গণবাহিনী, lit. 'National Socialist Party – People's Army'), better known as just Gonobahini (Bengali: গণবাহিনী, lit. 'People's Army'), was the armed wing of the Jatiya Samajtantrik Dal. The group was mainly composed of former Mukti Bahini members from the 1971 Bangladesh Liberation War.

== History ==
=== Origins (1962–1972) ===
In 1962, a group of student leaders at University of Dhaka, including Sirajul Alam Khan, formed an armed underground secessionist student political group Swadhin Bangla Biplobi Parishad or Free Bengal Revolutionary Council, also known as "Nucleus" within the East Pakistan Students' League. The group's central thesis was that the independence of East Bengal was a necessary condition for establishing a socialist party. They viewed the economic and political disparities between East and West Pakistan as the major political contradiction of that period.

During the 1971 Bangladesh Liberation War, an armed faction known as the Bangladesh Liberation Force (BLF), later known as the Mujib Bahini, was established. Political instruction was integrated into the training program within the BLF. Four Students' League leaders who were ideological followers of Sirajul Alam Khan, Hasanul Haq Inu, Sharif Nurul Ambia, A. F. M. Mahbubul Haq, and Masud Ahmed Rumi were selected to deliver regular political lectures to the BLF trainees.

A faction of military officers including Lieutenant Colonel Abu Taher and Lieutenant Colonel M. Ziauddin proposed alternative military strategies at the same time. Taher and Ziauddin rejected the conventional military structure. They advocated for dispersing military personnel into the districts to train guerrilla brigades drawn directly from the peasantry. Taher estimated that a productive peasant army of 100,000 men could be raised within a year. He argued that this approach would avoid reliance on foreign military assistance.

After the independence of Bangladesh, ideological divisions regarding the country's political and economic framework led to formal organizational splits within the Awami League's affiliated wings. The student wing (Bangladesh Chhatra League) divided in April 1972. The peasant wing (Bangladesh Krishak League) split in May 1972, and the workers' front (Bangladesh Jatiya Sramik League) split in June 1972. These breakaway factions formed the convening committee of the Jatiya Samajtantrik Dal (Jasad) on 21 October 1972. They officially described it as a socialist mass organization. Secret members, including Colonel Abu Taher, joined the Central Organizing Committee by December 1972.

Jasad leader Major (Retd.) M. A. Jalil formally introduced Colonel Abu Taher to Sirajul Alam Khan in the latter half of 1972. Taher had maintained contact with the underground Purba Banglar Sarbahara Party (Proletarian Party) and its leader, Siraj Sikder, before this introduction. Taher provided the Sarbahara Party with financial and material assistance, including weaponry, throughout 1972. He allowed Sikder to use his official military residence inside the Cumilla Cantonment as a periodic safe house. Taher also procured a wireless transmitter for the party, and his younger brother, Abu Sayeed, delivered it secretly. The Jasad central leadership was fully aware of Taher's communications with these underground factions as he integrated into their organization.

=== Emergence of Jasad and military dissent (late 1972–1973) ===
On 21 October 1972, dissident factions split from the Awami League's student, peasant, and workers' wings formed the convening committee of a new political organization, the Jatiya Samajtantrik Dal (Jasad). The organization did not use the label of a formal political party at first. Instead, it positioned itself as a socialist mass organization. The founding members of this committee included Major (Retd.) M. A. Jalil, A. S. M. Abdur Rob, Shajahan Siraj, Bidhan Krishna Sen, Nur Alam Ziku, and Sultan Uddin Ahmed. Major Jalil served as the joint convenor when the organization started. On 26 December 1972, he was formally elected as the chairman of the party during its council session. Jasad functioned as an active anti-government opposition force under this new leadership. The party declared that its primary objective was the establishment of scientific socialism through a proletarian revolution. In December 1972, the initial convening committee expanded into the Central Organizing Committee of Jasad.

At the same time, profound dissent developed within the upper ranks of the Bangladesh military command. This disagreement regarded the structural and strategic future of the armed forces. Lieutenant Colonel Abu Taher and Lieutenant Colonel M. Ziauddin actively opposed government initiatives to rebuild the military as a traditional, colonial-style conventional army. They argued that a conventional standing army would act as a severe economic burden in a developing nation like Bangladesh. They believed it would drain the economic surplus required for national investment and production. They also contended that this military structure would force the country to rely heavily on foreign military assistance and imperialist loans, which would compromise national independence.

As an alternative, Taher and Ziauddin proposed a policy of absolute self-reliance. They advocated for a National Militia model. Soldiers under this framework would engage in military duties and perform daily physical labor alongside peasants and workers. Taher implemented this concept during his command of the 44th Brigade in Cumilla. Officers and soldiers there engaged in intensive crop cultivation and planted large pineapple orchards. They also formed specialized work teams to assist local villages with plowing, planting, irrigation, and flood control.

The government rejected these alternative military concepts. It prioritized the development of the Jatiya Rakkhi Bahini instead, which was a paramilitary force organized with the direct involvement of Indian officers and advisors. In the late summer of 1972, Ziauddin expressed his deep political disillusionment by publishing a signed article in the opposition weekly, *Holiday*. He openly criticized the state of the country in the piece. He asserted that a secret treaty had been signed with India and demanded the public disclosure of its terms. Prime Minister Sheikh Mujibur Rahman requested an official apology from Ziauddin after the publication to avoid formal recriminations. Ziauddin refused to apologize. In late 1972, this led to his dismissal from active military service. In November 1972, Taher also resigned from the army due to these disagreements over military structure and policy.

By December 1972, Colonel Abu Taher secretly joined the Central Organizing Committee of Jasad. Taher aligned with Jasad because he believed the organization was actively developing the mass base and political program required to establish a revolutionary socialist government. He operated as a leading, covert figure within the party's armed wing, the Biplopi Gono Bahini (People's Revolutionary Army). He submitted to the political direction of the party's National Committee.

Ziauddin was drawn to the Purba Banglar Sarbahara Party (East Bengal Proletarian Party) led by Siraj Sikder. He viewed it as the most militarily active force opposing a government he believed had betrayed the ideals of the Liberation War. Ziauddin started a process of intentional lifestyle changes to align with the working class after his dismissal. For half a year, he traveled in third-class train compartments, visited remote rural areas, and systematically altered his upper-class personal habits. In February 1974, Ziauddin severed contact with his closest associates. He left behind only a brief note stating that he had committed fully to the underground movement. In May 1974, clandestine leaflets distributed in Dhaka and military cantonments officially announced that the former brigade commander had joined the Sarbahara Party's Marxist underground. Taher maintained personal contact with Ziauddin and hoped to foster unity among the disparate underground factions. However, Taher remained critical of Sikder's movement, assessing that it lacked a solid mass base and a coherent socio-political analysis.

=== Formation of Gonobahini (1974) ===
In late 1973 and early 1974, Bangladesh experienced a severe economic crisis and a major famine. The Jatiya Samajtantrik Dal (Jasad) started a series of mass anti-government protests because of these deteriorating conditions. The party held large public rallies, drawing crowds of up to 100,000 people in December 1973. It also organized nationwide general strikes in January and February 1974.

On 17 March 1974, Jasad leaders directed a mass hunger march to surround the official residence of the home minister Mansur Ali. Hasanul Haq Inu led a group of armed men to attack the residence of home minister, which resulted in a massacre. This event became known as the Ramna Massacre. Official government announcements reported eight deaths, but medical personnel at the Dhaka Medical College Hospital estimated more than thirty. The Gonobahini is also accused of killing numerous Bangladesh Chhatra League and Awami League members.

The government launched a widespread crackdown on Jasad activists across the country right after the march. The party's offices and the premises of its daily newspaper, *Gonokantho*, were vandalized and burned. The top organizational leadership, including Jasad President Major (Retd.) M. A. Jalil and General Secretary A. S. M. Abdur Rob, were arrested and imprisoned.

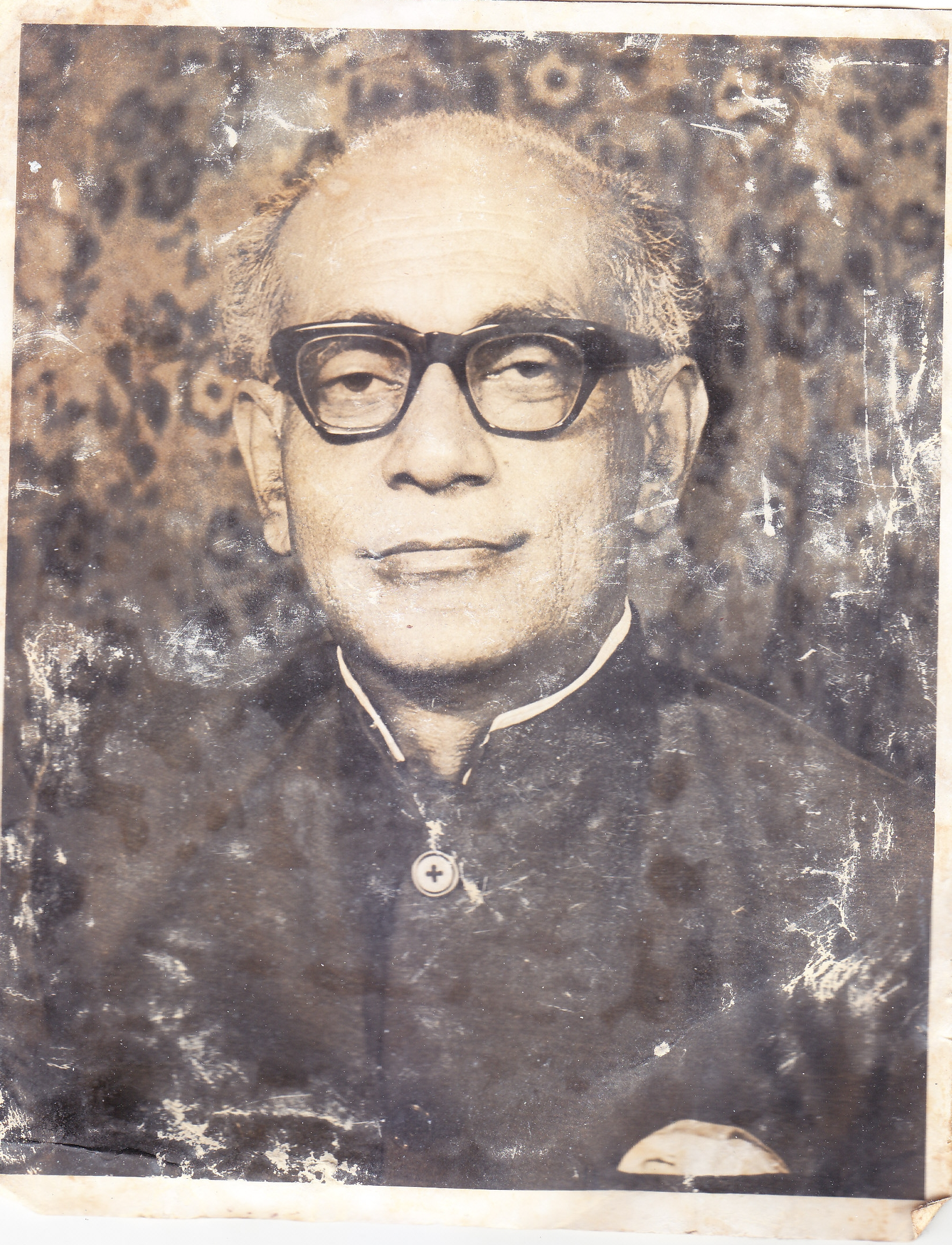
Home Minister Muhammad Mansur Ali

The open political network of the party was severely disrupted. Jasad was forced to operate underground and changed its political strategy. The leadership decided to abandon public parliamentary politics and start an armed struggle against the government. In July 1974, Jasad officially established its militant wing, the Biplopi Gonobahini (People's Revolutionary Army), which became widely known as the Gonobahini. Colonel Abu Taher, who kept his secret affiliation with the party closely guarded, was appointed as the military commander of the armed force.

Following the formation of the Gonobahini, the armed cadres initiated an underground insurgency in the rural districts of Bangladesh, assuming local law enforcement functions and establishing parallel justice systems. In areas such as Tarapur village, Jatiya Samajtantrik Dal (Jasad) cadres began moving openly during the daytime and conducted recruitment drives among the local peasantry for the armed wing. The cadres actively organized the village youth, giving literate members the responsibility of reading and explaining Marxist texts to illiterate peasants to build support for a socialist people's war.

The Gonobahini engaged in strict vigilante justice and the targeted assassination of notorious local bandits. The cadres executed thieves who had harassed the rural population, particularly prioritizing the execution of individuals who committed robberies while falsely claiming affiliation with Jasad. These vigilante actions garnered strong support from local villagers, who viewed state police and army forces as corrupt entities closely aligned with local elites who freely looted houses and made false arrests. The armed cadres systematically targeted local landlords and former Awami League officials accusing them of misappropriating state relief funds. Landlords were threatened with execution if they reported party activities to the police or obstructed the party's objectives. This strategy successfully forced rural elites to cooperate with the party's directives, effectively ceding administrative and law-and-order control of these localized areas to the insurgents.

In October 1974, the party's peasant front, the Jatiya Krishak League, published a booklet titled "Program for Socialist Agricultural Revolution" to establish a policy framework for the abolition of sharecropping and the creation of agricultural cooperatives.

On Eid-ul-Fitr in December 1974, one of the most high-profile incidents of this assassination campaign occurred. During the morning Eid prayers in the Kushtia district, Golam Kibria, a sitting Awami League Member of Parliament (MP), was assassinated. This assassination in a crowded religious gathering marked a significant escalation in the underground armed struggle. It served as a major catalyst for the Awami League government's subsequent declaration of a national state of emergency on 28 December 1974.

=== Infiltration of the military and the November coup d'état (1975) ===
Operating concurrently with the civilian armed wing, the Gonobahini, the Jatiya Samajtantrik Dal (Jasad) and Colonel Abu Taher spent over a year clandestinely organizing a network within the regular armed forces. This covert group, named the Biplobi Shainik Sangstha (BSS or Organisation of Revolutionary Soldiers), mobilized rank-and-file soldiers (sepoys) and non-commissioned officers. The primary objective of the BSS was the establishment of a classless military structure that would eliminate the traditional hierarchy and privileges dividing commanding officers and enlisted personnel.

In August 1975, President Sheikh Mujibur Rahman was assassinated during a military coup executed by junior officers. This event created a significant power vacuum and initiated a period of severe instability and factional conflict within the military command structure.

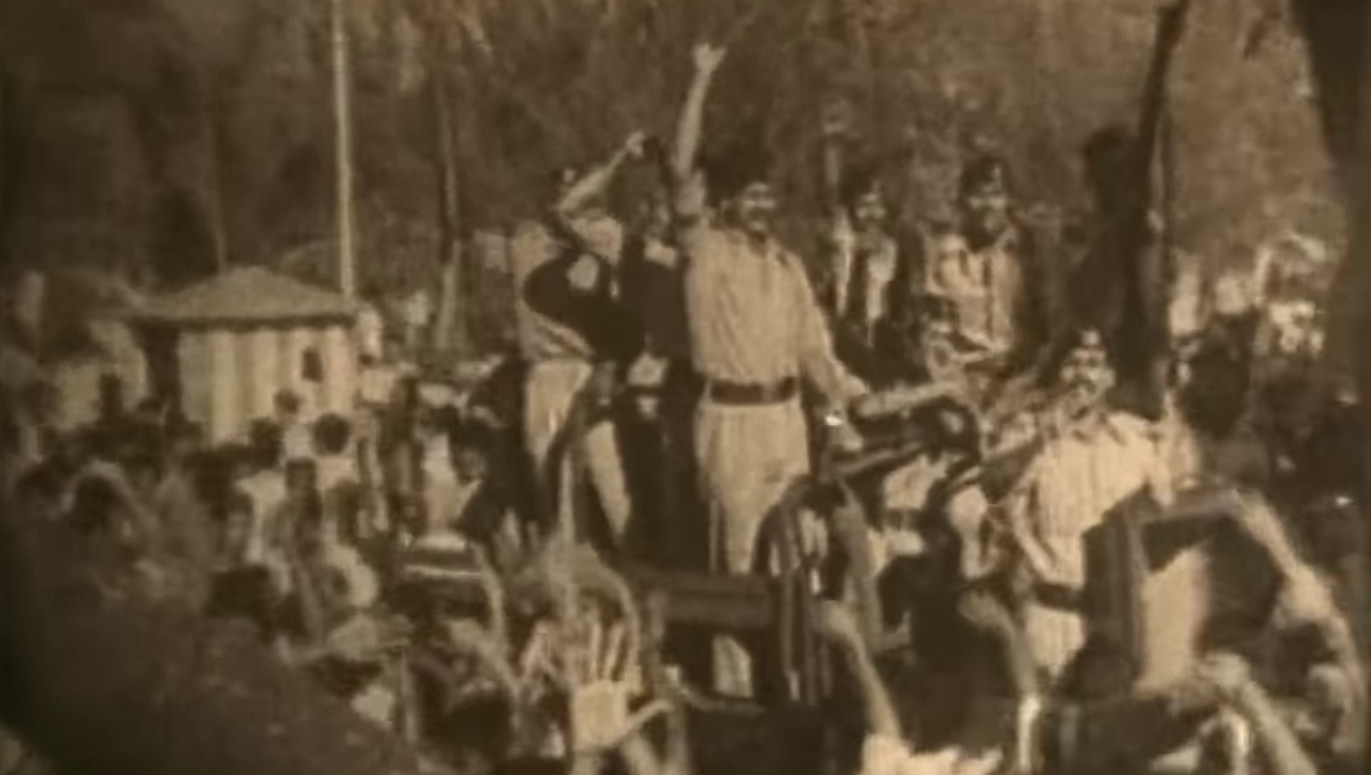
Soldiers of the Biplobi Shainik Sangstha after the successful counter coup d'état on 7 November 1975

The internal military conflict culminated in a counter-coup launched by Brigadier Khaled Mosharraf on 3 November 1975. During this operation, Mosharraf arrested the Army Chief of Staff, Major General Ziaur Rahman, and assumed control of the military. In response to these developments, the BSS and the Gonobahini activated their covert networks. On 7 November 1975, the two organizations jointly launched a coordinated soldiers' mutiny and general insurrection against Mosharraf's command.

During the 7 November uprising, mutinying forces under the direction of Colonel Taher rescued Ziaur Rahman from confinement. Following the rescue, the insurrectionists issued a formal manifesto known as the Twelve Point Demand. This document outlined a series of radical structural changes for the state and military, including the immediate release of all political prisoners, the formal abolition of the officer-batman system (a colonial-era practice requiring enlisted soldiers to serve as personal aides to officers), and the establishment of a revolutionary army council to oversee military operations and state policy.

=== Suppression and disbandment (late 1975–1976) ===
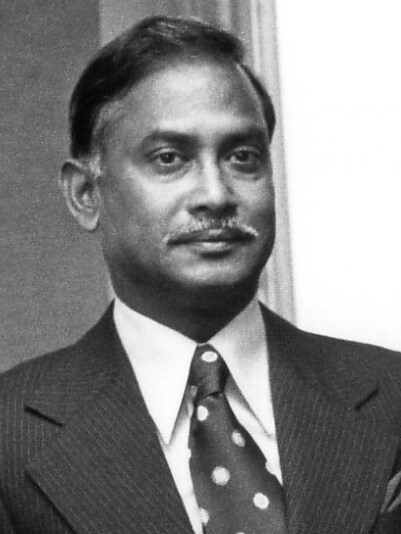
Ziaur Rahman began a crackdown against Gonobahini sympathizers within the armed forces after being appointed as Chief of Army Staff and Deputy Chief Martial Law Administrator (DCMLA)

Following the 7 November uprising, Major General Ziaur Rahman initially ordered the release of Jasad leaders from prison, including the party's president, Major (Retd.) M. A. Jalil, and general secretary, A. S. M. Abdur Rob, on 8 November 1975. However, Ziaur Rahman quickly moved to suppress the radical elements within the armed forces, rejecting the soldiers' demands for a classless military structure. In response to this reversal, Jasad formally disassociated itself from Ziaur Rahman on 15 November, publishing leaflets that characterized his actions as counter-revolutionary and aligned with right-wing interests.

Ziaur Rahman subsequently utilized paramilitary police forces and the National Security Intelligence (NSI) to initiate a widespread crackdown on Jasad and its armed wing. On the night of 23 November 1975, authorities re-arrested Jalil and Rob, alongside other prominent leaders such as Hasanul Haq Inu. The following day, 24 November, Colonel Abu Taher was surrounded by paramilitary police and arrested. He was subsequently flown by helicopter to Rajshahi District Jail and placed in solitary confinement. The government then launched a nationwide operation, detaining hundreds of Jasad members, trade union leaders, and military personnel associated with the mutiny.

On 26 November 1975, two days after the arrest of Colonel Abu Taher. Four Jasad sympathizers including two of Taher's younger brothers, attempted to take the Indian High Commissioner, Samar Sen, as a hostage. As Sen entered the embassy, he was grabbed by the abductors, who shouted that he was a hostage and demanded that no one shoot. The Ambassador's bodyguards responded by opening fire with light machine guns. This action wounded the High Commissioner and instantly killed two of the kidnappers, including one of Taher's brothers. The two surviving members of the group were taken into custody and later confessed to the police. They stated that their objective was to hold Sen hostage to compel the government to release imprisoned Jasad leaders, including Taher, Major (Retd.) M. A. Jalil, A. S. M. Abdur Rob, and Hasanul Haq Inu. The survivors informed the authorities that they had acted independently and without official party authority from Jasad. They stated they were motivated by the belief that Major General Ziaur Rahman had betrayed the 7 November uprising. The government significantly escalated its nationwide crackdown and mass arrests against Jasad following this abortive kidnapping attempt.

On 15 June 1976, the government announced the formation of Special Military Tribunal No. 1, chaired by Colonel Yusuf Haider. The trial commenced on 21 June 1976 and was held in complete secrecy at Dhaka Central Jail, marking the first time a trial had been conducted within the confines of a prison in the region's history. A strict news blackout was imposed, and defense lawyers were required to take an oath of secrecy regarding the proceedings. Colonel Taher was tried alongside 33 co-defendants, including 22 members of the armed forces and several civilian Jasad leaders, such as M. A. Jalil, A. S. M. Abdur Rob, Hasanul Haq Inu, Mohammed Shajahan, and Mahmudur Rahman Manna. The charges included mutiny, high treason, and the propagation of political ideology within the defense and police forces.

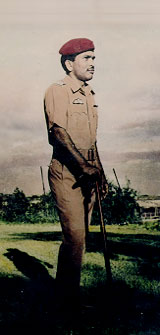
Gonobahini Commander Abu Taher was executed on 21 July 1976

The tribunal delivered its verdicts on 17 July 1976. Colonel Abu Taher was sentenced to death. Major M. A. Jalil and Abu Yusuf Khan were sentenced to life imprisonment and had their property confiscated. A. S. M. Abdur Rob, Hasanul Haq Inu, and Major Ziauddin were sentenced to ten years of rigorous imprisonment and received financial penalties. Despite appeals for a retrial and clemency from organizations including Amnesty International, President A. M. Sayem upheld the tribunal's decision. Colonel Abu Taher was executed by hanging at Dhaka Central Jail at 4:00 a.m. on 21 July 1976. Major Jalil remained incarcerated under his life sentence until he was eventually released on 24 March 1980.

On 2 October 1977, a mutiny by Bangladesh Air Force and Signal Corps of Bangladesh Army took place in Dhaka. The uprising was presumably organized by the Biplobi Shainik Sangstha. The rebellion within the armed forces was believed to be partly connected to internal objections over a British Military Mission that had arrived in Bangladesh to set up a military staff college. During the mutiny, rebel soldiers explicitly claiming to be members of the Gonobahini captured the national radio station and held it for approximately three hours. Over the broadcasts, the rebels announced the initiation of an armed revolution led jointly by the armed forces, students, peasants, and workers. The New York Times reported that "The rebel troops seized the Government radio early today and said 'A successful armed revolution has taken place with the help of the army, navy, air force, students and police". At the same time, the rebel forces captured strategic points within the Dhaka cantonment, advanced toward the president's residence, and launched a direct assault on the Dhaka airport. Air Force Chief A. G. Mahmood and other senior officials were at the airport at the time of the attack. They were engaged in negotiations with Japanese Red Army hijackers who had taken over Japan Air Lines Flight 472. The Times reported that at least 230 persons died during the mutiny. Following the failed coup, President Ziaur Rahman initiated mass executions of military personnel. According to official records, 1143 members of the Bangladesh armed forces were executed in two months after 9 October 1977. This was the first mass execution of military personnel on this scale in South Asia.

== Criticism ==
In 2016, Bangladesh Awami League general secretary Syed Ashraful Islam remarked that Jatiya Samajtantrik Dal and Gonobahini had created the political atmosphere that led to the assassination of Sheikh Mujibur Rahman. Opposition party leaders also hold its activities responsible for Sheikh Mujib's killing. BNP politician Ruhul Kabir Rizvi called it "the Al Qaeda of its day."

== See also ==
- Lal Bahini
