= 7 November 1975 Bangladeshi coup d'état =

1975 military uprising in Bangladesh

- Part of the Cold War in Asia, 1972–1975 Bangladesh insurgency and the military coups in Bangladesh
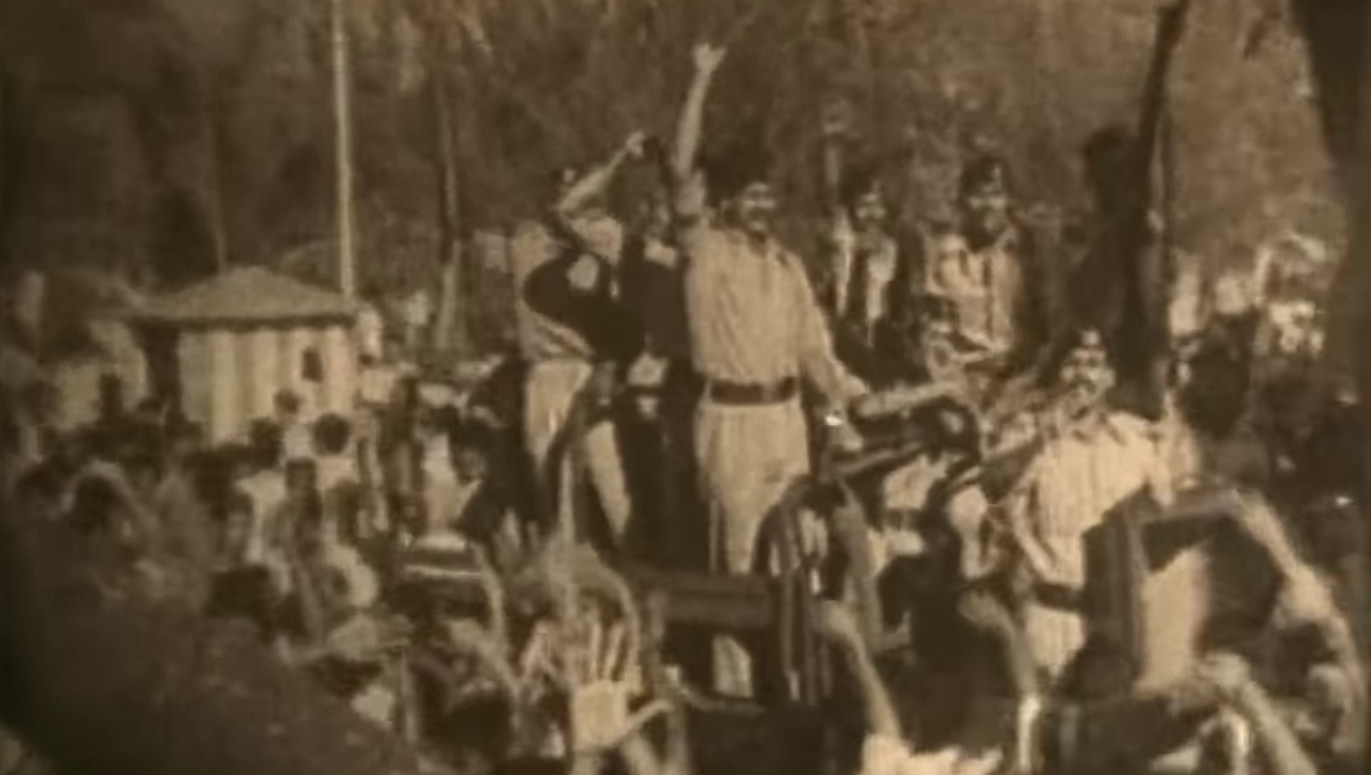
- Soldiers of the Biplobi Shainik Sangstha being received by the public on 7 November 1975
- Date: 7 November 1975
- Location: Dhaka, Bangladesh
- Caused by: 3 November 1975 Bangladeshi coup d'état
- Goals: Rescue of Ziaur Rahman; Socialist revolution
- Result: Ziaur Rahman's release and ascension to power; Assassination of Khaled Mosharraf and other army officers; 65% of officers loose control of their troops; Exile and counter-trial of the rebels

Parties
Jatiya Samajtantrik Dal; (Bangladesh) Biplobi Shainik Sangstha; Supported by: General soldiers of Bangladesh Army; General mass; Anti-Awami League opposition	Bangladesh Army

Lead figures
Abu Taher (executed)	(Bangladesh) Khaled Mosharraf X (Bangladesh) Khondkar Nazmul Huda † (Bangladesh) A.T.M. Haider †

Casualties
- Deaths: 43 officers (including Mosharraf, Huda & Haider)
- Detained: 33 BSS & JaSaD members (including Taher)

The 7 November 1975 Bangladeshi coup d'état, also known as the Sipahi–Janata Revolution (Bengali: সিপাহী–জনতার বিপ্লব, romanized: Sipāhī–Jônôtār Biplôb, lit. 'Soldier–People's Revolution'), was launched by left-wing soldiers (Sipahi) of Biplobi Shainik Sangstha (BSS) under the leadership of Lt. Col. (retd.) Abu Taher.

The coup was primarily the result of the previous 3 November 1975 Bangladesh coup d'état, organised by Brig. Gen. Khaled Mosharraf against the government of Khandaker Mostaq Ahmed and those involved in assassination of Sheikh Mujibur Rahman, which saw the removal and house arrest of the Chief of Army Staff Lt. Gen. Ziaur Rahman. BSS and it's parent party, Jatiya Samajtantrik Dal (JaSaD), perceived it to be counter-revolutionary. On 7 November, with goals of freeing Zia and socialist revolution, BSS affiliated soldiers, along with the support from the general masses, revolted against Khaled and other officers of Bangladesh Army and snatched the power. Zia was freed and restored as the chief of army staff.

The coup resulted in the death of Mosharraf and many other high-ranking officers. Army's chain of command collapsed, around 65% of officers lost control of their soldiers. After a power struggle, Zia managed to restore order and detained key plotters of the coup, including Taher himself, who would be executed in 1976 after a military trial, later declared illegal by the Supreme Court.

The coup enabled Zia to consolidate power and eventually become the president of Bangladesh later. The National Revolution and Solidarity Day is observed annually in Bangladesh on 7 November commemorating the event.

== Background ==
Following the 1971 Liberation War, Awami League under the leadership of Sheikh Mujibur Rahman took over the country. In October 1972, Jatiya Samajtantrik Dal was formed by splinter faction of Chhatra League, the student wing of the Awami League. Its armed wing, Gonobahini, led by Colonel (retd.) Abu Taher and Hasanul Haq Inu, began an armed campaign against the government with aim to establish scientific socialism and a Marxist state. Sheikh Mujib's three-year long regime failed to deter the insurgency due to "his misplaced confidence on people's power".

Sheikh Mujib was assassinated in the 15 August 1975 military coup and was replaced by an AL politician and minister Khondaker Mostaq Ahmad as the president. Mostaq replaced the Bangladesh Army chief, Maj. Gen. K M Shafiullah, with Maj. Gen. Ziaur Rahman, the deputy Army chief. Mostaq formed his own ministry, comprising the members from the AL and the military.

But the army officers involved in Sheikh Mujib's assassination broke the army's chain of command, as these young officers "began acting like generals" in the new Mostaq government. Brig. Gen. Khaled Mosharraf, the chief of general staff, had asked Zia to restore the chain of command in the army and Zia proved unwilling or unable to do so. As a result, Brig. Gen. Khaled and other officers including Col. Shafaat Jamil and Lt. Col. A. T. M. Haider staged 3 November 1975 coup, subsequently removing Khondaker Mostaq from power and detaining Zia at house. The coup was perceived to be Mujibist by the JaSaD and considered this a return of the previous regime.

== Prelude ==
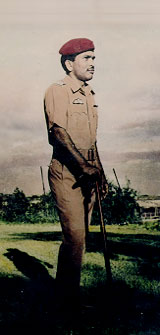
After being contacted by Ziaur Rahman, Abu Taher (pictured) organised secret meetings of the BSS every night between 4 and 6 November, in preparation of an uprising

The uprising was planned and conducted by the Biplobi Shainik Sangstha (BSS), a "vaguely socialist and egalitarian" organisation, formed by the JaSaD, led by Col. (retd.) Abu Taher, a retired army officer and freedom fighter who joined the JaSaD and led its armed branches. The party wanted to organize an October Revolution-like uprising in the country, and thought that post-3 November coup situation would perfectly meet the Marxist conditions for a socialist revolution.

On each night between 4 November and 6 November, BSS held regular secret meetings under Taher. On 5 and 6 November, the BSS distributed thousands of leaflets among soldiers and urban workers accusing Mosharraf of being in leagues with India in taking over the country. The BSS issued a list of 12 demands, which included the establishment of a of classless armed forces, to facilitate the creation of a classless society.

On the evening of 6 November, a meeting was held to finalise the plans for the uprising. According to the plans of the meeting, there would be two stages in the revolt, firstly to free Ziaur Rahman from detention and secondly, to implement the 12 demands of the BSS. As described by Professor Anwar Hossain, brother of Taher who participated in the uprising and later became the vice-chancellor of Jahangirnagar University:

Colonel Taher planned that the soldiers participating in the uprising would take to the streets, armed with weapons. He instructed each soldier to bring along several weapons, which would then be used to arm the workers and students waiting outside. This was how Colonel Taher envisioned an uprising of soldiers and the masses. Our objective was that, following the uprising, a revolutionary command council would be set up, POWs would be released, and a general election would be held in the country.

Zia was already a familiar figure inside and outside of the military. He broadcast the Proclamation of Bangladeshi Independence during the Liberation War. Taher also had close relations with Zia, both served as the sector commanders of the Sector I during the war. Because of this, Taher thought that having Zia freed and bringing him on their side would be helpful for the uprising.

== Uprising ==
The uprising began after midnight on 7 November in Dhaka Cantonment, when Subedar Mehboob fired a single rifle shot, signalling the start of the uprising, which soon spread to other areas, including Rangpur and Chittagong. According to eyewitness accounts, a terrifying situation unfolded inside the Dhaka Cantonment; the intensity of firings was so high that none could hear what anyone else was saying. Crowds soon poured into the streets of Dhaka to support the soldiers and both groups shouted slogans such as "নারায়ে তাকবীর, আল্লাহু আকবার!" ("Call of takbir, God the Greatest"), "সিপাহী–জনতা ভাই ভাই, জিয়াউর রহমানের মুক্তি চাই!" ("Soldiers and people are brothers, release Ziaur Rahman") and "সিপাহী সিপাহী ভাই ভাই, অফিসারদের রক্ত চাই!" ("Soldiers are brothers, want the blood of the officers!").

As the news of the uprising spread, ordinary people came down the streets and celebrated with the soldiers. They hugged the marching soldiers, climbed on the tanks, hoisted the national flag and chanted "anti-hegemony" slogans. The mood in the city was described as "exuberant" by Lawrence Lifschultz, an American diplomat. Civilians and soldiers piled onto the tanks of the 1st Bengal Lancers Regiment, which came out into the streets in support of the revolt. As described by the writer and researcher Mohiuddin Ahmed in his book Itihaser Bankbododol, Ekattur O Ponchattur:

The common people cheered and clapped on the sides of the road, and many rode tanks or army trucks for the first time in their lives and roamed the streets of Dhaka.

On the other side, Ziaur Rahman was freed from house arrest by the soldiers. Thousands of soldiers and people surrounded him in celebration. He taken to the headquarters of the 2nd Field Artillery regiment, where he had recorded a public speech. According to Lt. Col. (retd) MA Hamid, Zia said in the speech that he had assumed the position of Chief Martial Law Administrator at the "request of Army". Taher later reached there later. Witnesses claim that Zia embraced him and thanked him for saving his life, saying: "You have saved the nation". However, according to Hossain, the original plan was to take Zia to Taher's home at Elephant Road. Taher was astonished to see that the soldiers came back without Zia and they were told to bring him to Zia, upon which he reacted saying: "Our uprising plan is lost."

According to Major General Syed Muhammad Ibrahim, after Zia was brought to the headquarters of the 2nd Field Artillery regiment, he was very hesitant on what to do and where to go. Later on the advice of other officers, he decided to stay in the cantonment. According to Brigadier General M Sakhawat Hossain, who would later become an adviser in the interim government, after BSS soldiers and Taher arrived, they insisted him to go with them to Bangladesh Betar and proclaim the demands on behalf of BSS, which Zia refused to do, claiming that he had recorded a speech already. Hossain also claimed that if they had managed to take Zia out of the cantonment, he would never came back. When the BSS presented their twelve demands to Zia, he reportedly signed a document, affirming his support for the demands. Lifschultz suggested that signing the document may have been a "tactical decision", meaning that Zia only signed it to keep the BSS satisfied on the day of the uprising.

== Aftermath ==
=== Deaths of Mosharraf, Haider, and Huda ===
Khaled Mosharraf and his associates were at Bangabhaban when the uprising began. Upon realising that their 3 November coup had been undone, Mosharraf, A.T.M. Haider and Khondkar Nazmul Huda left Bangabhaban to seek safety at the headquarters of the 10 Bengal Regiment. Although the soldiers of the 10 Bengal had no direct link to the Biplobi Shainik Sangstha, they learned of the mutiny. The commanding officer of the 10 Bengal Regiment, Col. Nawazesh Uddin, held a meeting with his fellow officers to decide whether Mosharraf and his companions should be allowed to come to the headquarters of the 10 Bengal Regiment. Two officers present at the meeting, Cap. Asad and Cap. M. A. Jalil, reportedly said "Let the bastards come in, we'll sort them out!" Col. Nawazesh received a phone call from Lt. Gen. Zia, who told Nawazesh to ensure the safety of Mosharraf and his companions.

When Mosharraf, Haider and Huda arrived at the 10 Bengal Regiment headquarters, Col. Nawazesh ordered the soldiers not to harm the three officers. However, after the uprising, the soldiers were defiant and refused to listen to Col. Nawazesh's orders. Fearing for his own life, Col. Nawazesh did nothing to stop the soldiers from killing Mosharraf. An eyewitness claimed that Cap. Asad and Cap. Jalil ordered their soldiers to kill the three officers. Mosharraf and Huda were dragged out of an office and killed by automatic gunfire, while Haider was killed by a single shot, after Haider tried to reach for his pistol.

=== Killings of other officers ===
In Bangladesh: A Legacy of Blood, Anthony Mascarenhas wrote that the killings of other army officers began on 8 November. Because many officers did not agree with the 12 demands of the BSS, which resulted in serious confrontations between officers and their troops. In Dhaka and Rangpur, 40 officers, mostly freedom fighters, were killed by their troops and enlisted men were reported to have ripped badges off officer's lapels.

=== Restoring order ===
After the uprising, 65% of all officers in Bangladesh lost control of their troops. Army's chain of command completely collapsed, the distinction between superior and subordinate was being completely disregarded. Usurpers refused to obey the orders of their seniors. In such situation, the primary challenge facing Zia was to reestablish order within the military. As Lieutenant General Muhammad Mahbubur Rahman, former chief of army staff, described:

Ziaur Rahman was moving rapidly from cantonment to cantonments, like a meteor. There, soldiers were not surrendering their arms. Many were not even showing up at the cantonments. No one was obeying anyone. Yet, he had establish the command visiting each location.

Zia showed extremely rigorous attitude while establishing control, as noted by M Sakhawat Hossain: "he stood before the unruly soldiers armed with loaded rifles on a hockey field, and managed to calm them down." After Ziaur Rahman granted pay rise to the enlisted men, many of the soldiers lost interest in the uprising. As he came to the centre of power, Taher was largely sidelined. In later weeks, he was able to pacify the remaining usurper soldiers.

According to Mohiuddin Ahmed, because people of the country desperately wanted stability, they found Zia as a strongman and supported him; while JaSaD, which had already fought an insurgency against the Sheikh Mujib regime, was disapproved by the people. Experts also noted that Zia successfully utilized the anti-Awami League sentiment prevalent in the country, which JaSaD also had tried to exploit but failed, which provided Zia with an upper hand.

=== Execution of Taher ===
On 24 November, Col. Abu Taher was arrested for high treason and murder and was put on trial, along with 33 other members of Jatiya Samajtantrik Dal. On 17 July 1976, Taher was sentenced to death and was executed on 21 July 1976. It's debated why Zia ordered the arrest of Taher, the mastermind of the uprising who had freed him. According to Rahman, most of thr officers pressured Zia to put Taher on trial, as they believed that the structure of military would be "destroyed" if Taher remains free. According to Hannan, BSS was preparing for another coup after their 12-points demands remained unaddressed.

In his final letter, Taher described Ziaur Rahman as a "traitor" and claimed that he was freed from detention under Taher's orders. According to Hasanul Haq Inu, Taher said in his final judicial statement:

"Zia has betrayed not only me, but also the revolutionary soldiers, the sacred pledge of November 7, in short, the entire nation. We have been stabbed in the back. Compared to Khaled Mosharraf, Zia has proven to be the other side of the coin. There is only one other example of such betrayal in the history of our nation, and that is Mir Jafar."

=== Zia's ascension to the power ===
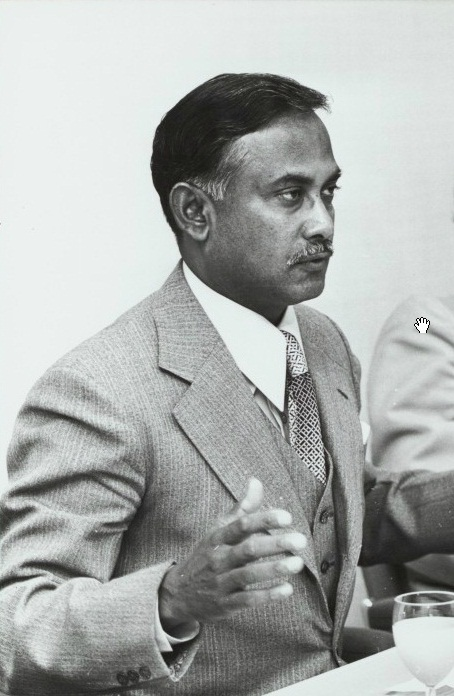
After the uprising, Ziaur Rahman (pictured) proclaimed himself the Deputy Chief Martial Law Administrator and held ministries in the Sayem administration, later became the President removing Sayem.

The events of 7 November paved the path to the presidency for Ziaur Rahman. On this day following Mosharraf's death, President Sayem assumed the role of Chief Martial Law Administrator (CMLA) and Maj. Gen. Zia was made Deputy CMLA. A year later, President Sayem handed over CMLA duties to Zia and months after that stepped down on "health reason", and Zia became acting president in the absence of a vice president. Zia also abolished the position of chief of defence staff, a position above the chiefs of three forces, in order to consolidate power and exercise total domination over the forces.

== Legacy ==
On 22 March 2011, after Taher's family filed a writ petition, the High Court Division of the Supreme Court overturned the previous judgment that had authorised his execution by military tribunal. The military tribunal judgment was declared illegal. The court observed that the execution had happened according to Major General Ziaur Rahman's plan described the execution as a "cold-blooded assassination" in its judgment.

Bangladeshi nationalists view the event as the foundation of their ideology. According to Salahuddin Ahmed, BNP politician and current Home Minister, Bangladeshi nationalism is the "concrete expression" of the "political philosophy that emerged in Bangladesh following the revolution of 7 November". While Taher's party, the JaSaD, holds that Zia betrayed the revolutionaries.

In reminiscence to the uprising, 7 November is observed as the National Revolution and Solidarity Day in Bangladesh. The Bangladesh Nationalist Party (BNP), which was founded by Ziaur Rahman after he became president, commemorates the day and regards the coup d'état a "civil military uprising". On the other hand, the Awami League calls it Freedom Fighters Killing Day and views it negatively. The celebrations of the day were suppressed under the regime of Sheikh Hasina. JaSaD also observes it as "Sipahi–Janata Revolution Day".

Journalist Afsan Chowdhury described the uprising as the "closest that any Marxist force of whatever description in Bangladesh reached the doors of state power". Pro-BNP political analyst Maruf Mallick claimed that if Taher, instead of Zia, ascended to power, Bangladesh would ultimately turn into a one-party dictatorship. Mohiuddin Ahmed concluded that "in the power struggle, Zia won and the JaSaD lost".

== See also ==
- Military coups in Bangladesh
- 1972–1975 Bangladesh insurgency
- July Uprising
