= Lutfa Taher =

Bangladeshi politician, Member of parliament

Member of Parliament
- In office 19 March 2014 – 6 August 2024

Personal details
- Born: 31 July 1947 (age 78)
- Party: Jatiya Samajtantrik Dal
- Relations: Abu Taher (husband)

Lutfa Taher (born 31 July 1947) is a Bangladeshi politician who is a Jatiya Samajtantrik Dal member of parliament.

== Biography ==
Lutfa Taher was married to Colonel Abu Taher. Her husband was executed on 17 July 1976 after a trial by military court. Lutfa Taher, her brother-in-law M. Anwar Hossain, and the wife of Yousuf Ali Khan who was sentenced to life in prison by the same military tribunal and was Taher's brother, Fatema Yousuf filled petitions questioning the legality of the military tribunal on 22 August 2010. On 10 January 2009 Bangladesh High Court started the hearing on the case. On 22 August 2011, Justices AHM Shamsuddin Chowdhury Manik and Sheikh M Jakir Hossain gave their verdict on the case. On 20 May 2013 Bangladesh High Court declared the military tribunal verdict illegal and unconstitutional.

On 7 November 2007, during the caretaker government rule, Lutfa Taher refuted the statement of Khandaker Abdur Rashid, convicted killer of President Sheikh Mujibur Rahman, who alleged that Colonel Abu Taher and General Ziaur Rahman were involved with the military coup that saw the overthrow and murder of Sheikh Mujibur Rahman. Abdur Rashid made the allegation on a Channel i interview. On 19 March 2014, she was elected unopposed from reserved seats for women in the parliament as a candidate of Jatiya Samajtantrik Dal.
