= Biplobi Shainik Sangstha =

1970s socialist mutineer group in Bangladesh

Organisation of Revolutionary Soldiers
- বিপ্লবী সৈনিক সংস্থা
- Other name: BSS
- Founder: M. A. Jalil
- Leader: Abu Taher
- Founded: 1 January 1973; 53 years ago
- Dissolved: 25 November 1975; 50 years ago
- Country: Bangladesh
- Allegiance: Jatiya Samajtantrik Dal
- Ideology: Vanguardism; Revolutionary socialism Scientific socialism Left-wing nationalism Anti-Mujibism
- Political position: Left-wing to far-left
- Part of: Bangladesh Army

The Biplobi Shainik Sangstha (Bengali: বিপ্লবী সৈনিক সংস্থা, lit. 'Organisation of Revolutionary Soldiers') was a clandestine revolutionary socialist group of sepoy mutineers within the Bangladesh Army, active from 1973 to 1975. The BSS was formed by the Jatiya Samajtantrik Dal (JaSaD) and led by Maj. M.A. Jalil and Lt. Col. (retd.) Abu Taher. The BSS is known for staging the 7 November 1975 coup through the Sipahi–Janata Revolution, which would eventually make way for the rise of Lt. Gen. Ziaur Rahman in the country's politics.

== Foundation ==
The BSS was founded on 1 January 1973 at the staff quarters of Havildar Bari, who was part of Armoured Corps. The members were mainly junior and non-commissioned officers, who pledged their allegiance to the BSS by touching a Quran. The group held secret meetings at the Ahsanullah Hall of Bangladesh University of Engineering and Technology (BUET). JaSaD founder Serajul Alam Khan was present at these meetings. Meetings were also held at the house of Abu Taher's brother, Flight Sergeant Abu Yusuf Khan.

The BSS was popular among soldiers who served in Sector XI during the Bangladesh Liberation War, as Abu Taher was one the commanders of that sector. The group was also popular among soldiers from Comilla Cantonment, where Taher had once served as the commanding officer.

== Sipahi–Janata Revolution ==
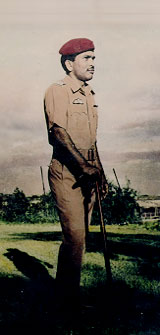
After being contacted by Ziaur Rahman, Abu Taher organised secret meetings of the BSS every night between 4 and 6 November, in preparation of an uprising

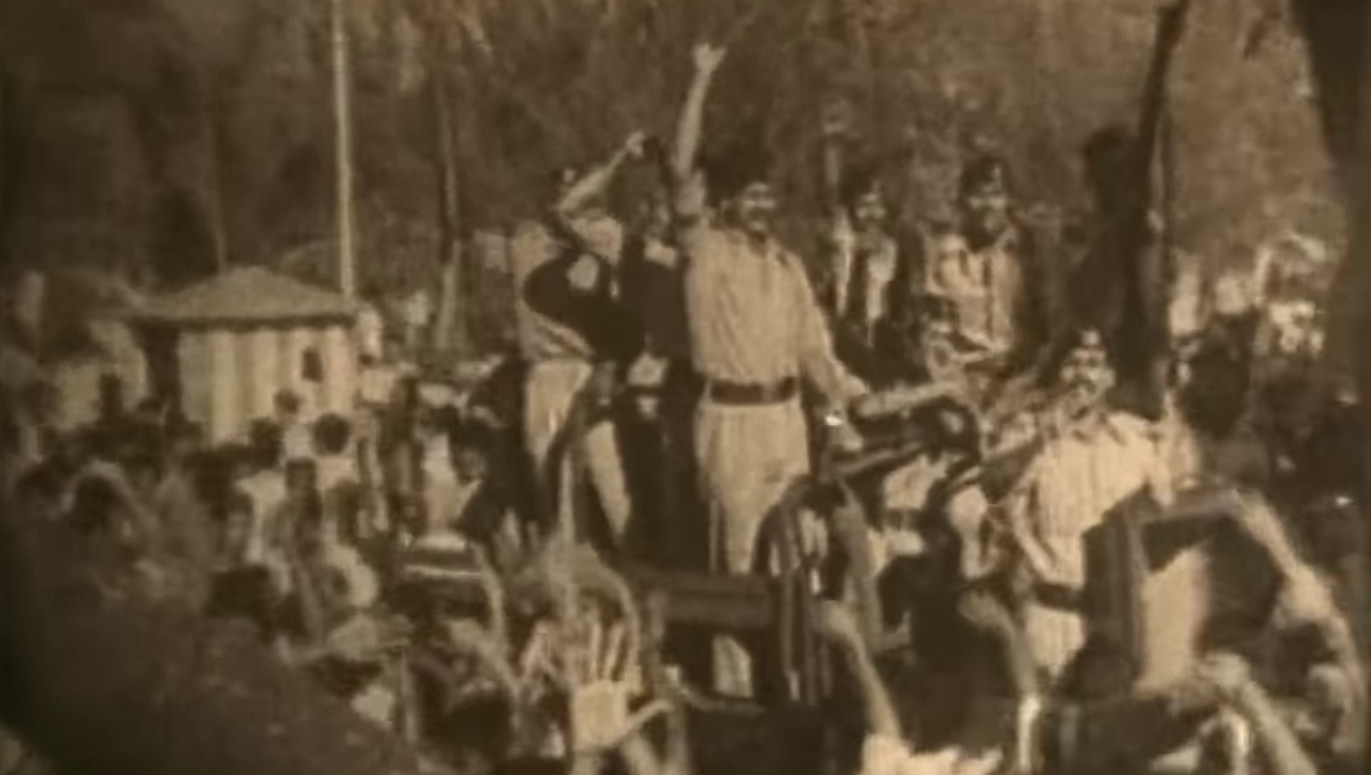
BSS soldiers being received by the public during the Sipahi–Janata Revolution

After the assassination of Sheikh Mujibur Rahman on 15 August 1975, Khondaker Mostaq Ahmad came to power. Under Mostaq's new government, the young army officers involved in Sheikh Mujib's assassination started "acting like generals", breaking the army's chain of command. In response to this, Brig. Khaled Mosharraf asked Lt. Gen. Ziaur Rahman to restore the chain of command, which Zia was either unwilling or unable to do.

On 3 November, Brig. Khaled Mosharraf, Col. Khondkar Nazmul Huda and Lt. Col. Abu Taher Mohammad Haider staged a coup removing Mostaq from power and placed Zia under house arrest. Before Zia was detained, he called Taher, urging him to do something.

=== Twelve demands ===
In response to Zia's request, the BSS held secret meetings each night between 4 and 6 November, under the leadership of Taher. The group had two goals, namely to free Zia from imprisonment and to implement a list of twelve demands. The twelve demands were of a left-wing nature, as the opening line of the declaration read:

"This revolution is for one purpose – the interests of the oppressed classes. For that, the entire structure of the armed forces must be changed. For many days we were the army of the richer class. The rich have used us for their own interests. The events of August 15 is but one example. However, this time we have revolted neither for the cause of the rich nor on their behalf. This time we have revolted alongside the masses of the country. From today onwards the armed forces of the nation shall build themselves as the defender of the country's oppressed classes."

=== Uprising ===
By midnight on 6 November, all the preparations for the uprising were complete. Subedar Mehboob fired a single shot during the early hours of 7 November, which signalled the start of the uprising. Soldiers looted the armouries and boarded trucks and jeeps to occupy key locations in Dhaka. Troops from Jessore and Comilla came to Dhaka, in support of the uprising. During the coup, thousands of civilians poured into the streets to support the soldiers and shouted slogans such as "The people and soldiers have united".

On 6 November night, soldiers belonging to the BSS freed Zia from imprisonment and took him to the headquarters of the 2nd Field Artillery regiment. According to Lt. Col. (retd) MA Hamid, Zia said in the speech that he had assumed the position of Chief Martial Law Administrator at the "request of Army". When Taher arrived at the headquarters, Zia reportedly embraced him and thanked Taher for saving his life. "You have saved the nation", Zia also said. When the BSS presented their twelve demands to Zia, he reportedly signed a document, affirming his support for the demands. However, few of the demands would be met, as Zia had most of the leaders of the BSS arrested within a few weeks after the coup. Lawrence Lifschultz suggested that signing the document may have been a "tactical decision", meaning that Zia only signed it to keep the BSS satisfied on the day of the uprising.

=== Killing of Mosharraf, Huda and Haider ===
Mosharraf, Huda and Haider were killed during the uprising when the three officers went to the headquarters of the 10 Bengal Regiment. An eyewitness claimed that Capt. Jalil and Capt. Asad of the 10 Bengal Regiment ordered their troops to kill the three officers. Anthony Mascarenhas suggested that either Capt. Jalil or Capt. Asad may have been influenced by Abu Taher.

=== Taher–Zia split ===
According to MA Hamid, the rift between Taher and Zia intensified and came to a head from 7 November, as Zia was unwilling to accept all the demands of the BSS. As a result, the BSS soldiers began preparing for another countercoup against the officers. On the night of that day, 12 army officers were shot dead by the BSS soldiers in Dhaka Cantonment. Between 9 and 10 November, BSS and Chief of Army Staff Lt. Gen. Zia held regular meetings. The soldiers of BSS became agitated during the meeting on 10 November. Failing to pacify them, Zia, at one point, undid his uniform's waist belt and threw it on the ground, saying, "I don't want to be the chief of this army anymore if there are so many demands!" After that the situation calmed down a bit and it was assured that the demands of the soldiers would be accepted step by step. Zia then formally instructed the officers to take action against the mutineers.

== Dissolution ==
Within a few weeks of the 7 November coup, Zia had the leaders of the uprising arrested. On 23 November, Abu Taher's brother, Flight Sergeant Abu Yusuf Khan was arrested. When Abu Taher tried to contact Zia, he was not available. Instead, the Deputy Chief Martial Law Administrator, Major General Hussain Muhammad Ershad, spoke with him. Ershad informed Taher that the arrest of his brother was a police matter, which Ershad knew nothing about.

On 24 November, Taher himself was arrested and taken to Dhaka Central Jail. He was accused of "instigating indiscipline" among the soldiers and organising a "socialist revolution". A total of 33 people were put on trial, including:

- Lt. Col. (retd.) Abu Taher (sentenced to death)
- Maj. (dismissed) M. A. Jalil (sentenced to death, later reduced to life imprisonment)
- Ft. Ser. Abu Yusuf Khan (sentenced to death, later reduced to life imprisonment)

Abu Taher was hanged on 21 July 1976, in Dhaka Central Jail. After 37 years, in 2013, a High Court verdict stated that the trial of Abu Taher was illegal and described it as a "cold-blooded murder".

== See also ==
- Gonobahini
