= Afsan Chowdhury =

Bangladeshi researcher and columnist

- আফসান চৌধুরী
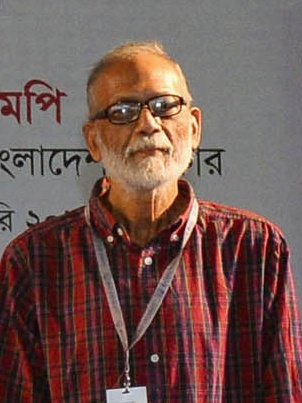
- Chowdhury at the 2018 Bangla Academy Award ceremony
- Born: 16 February 1952 (age 74)
- Occupations: Researcher, columnist
- Awards: Bangla Academy Literary Award (2018)

Afsan Chowdhury (born 16 February 1952) is a Bangladeshi liberation war researcher, columnist and journalist. He received Bangla Academy Award in the year 2018 for his contribution to the liberation war literature. Afsan has led over 100 research projects on Diversity and Discrimination. He was a short term Fellow at Oxford University, Oak Fellow on International Human Rights, Colby College in Maine (USA) and Research Associate at York Centre for Asian Research (YCAR) York University Toronto.

== Early life ==
Chowdhury was born on 16 February 1952 in Dhaka. He passed SSC from BAF Shaheen School in 1969, HSC from Dacca College in 1971. After completing his higher education from the Department of History in Dhaka University in 1976, he started his career in journalism. He also earned a MA from Dhaka University (1977) and a LL.B degree from City Law College (1982).

== Career ==
He is a professor (adjunct) BRAC University's Department of English and Humanities (2012–25), and a visiting fellow and professor of BRAC Institute for Governance and Development (2012–25). He is also a faculty of MA in Development Studies of BIGD (2012–25). He is a short-term fellow at Oxford University's Queen Elizabeth House (2003). And, an Oak Fellow on International Human Rights (2008) Colby College, Maine, US. He was a research associate at York Centre for Asian Research (YCAR) York University, Toronto, Canada (2007–12).

Research career

Over 100 research projects for national and international organizations on multiple topics ranging from media to human rights to development economics and counter-extremism. He has worked as an international consultant for UNICEF and others in Nigeria, Ethiopia, Turkmenistan, Nepal, India, Pakistan, Sri Lanka and the US.

Professional responsibilities

He was senior adviser of BRAC ( Advocacy, Communication& Research) from 2012 to 2016, co-coordinator of Bangladesh Canadian Community Services (2007–2012), director of advocacy (BRAC from 2002- 2007), senior assistant editor of The Daily Star (2001–02), South Asia director of Panos South Asia (Kathmandu, 2001–02). Also a producer of Ekushey TV, BBC reporter (1994–95), senior staff of Unicef (1986- 1993), acting editor of Dhaka Courier (1984–86) and a senior researcher of history of Liberation War Project 1977–1984.

== Books ==
| Book name | Publisher | Year of publication |
|---|---|---|
| Media in Times of Crisis | Srabon | 2003 |
| Bangladesh media : Challenges and transition | Kothaprokash | 2024 |
| Bangladesh Ekattur (4 volumes) (Editor and co-author) | Maula Brothers | 2006 |
| Gramer Ekattur | UPL | 2018 |
| Hindu jonogosthir Ekatrtur | UPL | 2019 |
| Narider Ekattur | UPL | 2022 |
| Oshojoh Andolon O Protirodh | Kothaprokash | 2021 |
| Mujibnagar : Kathamo O Karjobiboron | Kothaprokash | 2021 |
| Unissho Ekattur Sritite, Kothay, Lekhay | Srabon | 2020 |
| Unissho Ekattur. Pakistan Prosongo | Kothaprokash | 2022 |
| 1971: Antorjatik Porishor | Aitijjo | 2024 |
| 1971: Gonohotta-Gononirjaton | Kothaprokash | 2020 |
| 1971: Jatio o Antorjatik Gonomaddhom | Aitijjo | 2023 |
| Bangladesher Swadhinota Andoloner Dharabhaikotar Itihas | Kothaprokash | 2023 |
| Quest for a State: Seikh Mujib and Bangladesh | Srabon | 2020 |
| 1971: Orthonoitik Boishommo | Aitijjo | 2023 |
| Purbopatra (Joint Editor) | Little magazine | 1969–1973 |
| Bisshashaghatokgon (Novel) | UPL | 1993 and 2018 |
| Benche Thakar Shobdo | Srabon and Choitonno | 2004 and 2024 |
| Rokter Mehendi Dag | Kothaprokash | 2023 |
| Afsan chowdhury’r Chotogolpo (A short story –“Dhor” from this collection was made into a film, which won the National Film Award for short films) | Srabon | 2004 |
| Afrikar din ratri | Prosiddho | 2025 |
| Abed Bhai : Srtite, lekhay, Kothay | Aitijjo | 2023 |
| Mather Manush | | 2021 |
| Alvida pal ki shairi (n time of farewell) | URDU Language | 2007 |
| Lash Bebshar Chalchitro | Pathorkuchi | 2022 |
| Besshar Dalal Grik Tragedy Lekhe Na Keno (Audio-digital) | Pathorkuchi | 2023 |
| Conversations with Suleman (Poetry) | 2006(Srabon) and 2025 ( Portraits ) | |
| Mitti ka nam | Prosiddho | 2025 |
| Ekatturpedia : Historical encyclopedia of 1971 | Pathorkuchi | 2025 |
| Lalon Shah: A Historical reading | Cosmos books | 2025 |

== Media ==
He produced over 20 documentaries on housing refugees, climate change, development etc. Some of his notable work is 1971 History. a. Their war (2001). b. Women and war.(2023) c. Village warriors ( 2022). He produced some BBC radio shows. These are Women and 1971, Children in war, Biharis and 1971, DU and 197, Bangladesh 1971 (12 part series).

== Awards ==
- Bangla Academy Award 2018 (for 1971 history related work)
- BRAC Bank-Samakal award 2020 (for the book : 1971 Genocide and Repression : Structure and narrative)
- Ihsanul Karim Award for Media Excellence (2024)
