= Abu Taher Mohammad Haider =

Bangladesh Army officer, recipient of Bir Uttom

A. T. M. Haider
- আবু তাহের মোহাম্মদ হায়দার
- Born: 12 January 1942; Bhowanipore, Bengal, British India
- Died: 7 November 1975 (aged 33); Dhaka, Bangladesh
- Burial place: Sholakia, Kishoreganj District, Bangladesh
- Education: Pakistan Military Academy
- Military career
- Allegiance: Pakistan (Before 1971); Bangladesh
- Branch: Pakistan Army; Bangladesh Army
- Service years: 1965–1975
- Rank: Lieutenant Colonel
- Unit: Regiment of Artillery
- Commands: Commander of Sector – II; Sub-Commander of Sector – II; CO of 2nd Field Artillery Regiment; Director of Artillery School
- Conflicts: Indo-Pakistani War of 1965; Bangladesh Liberation War; First Siege of Dhaka; Second Siege of Dhaka †
- Awards: Bir Uttom

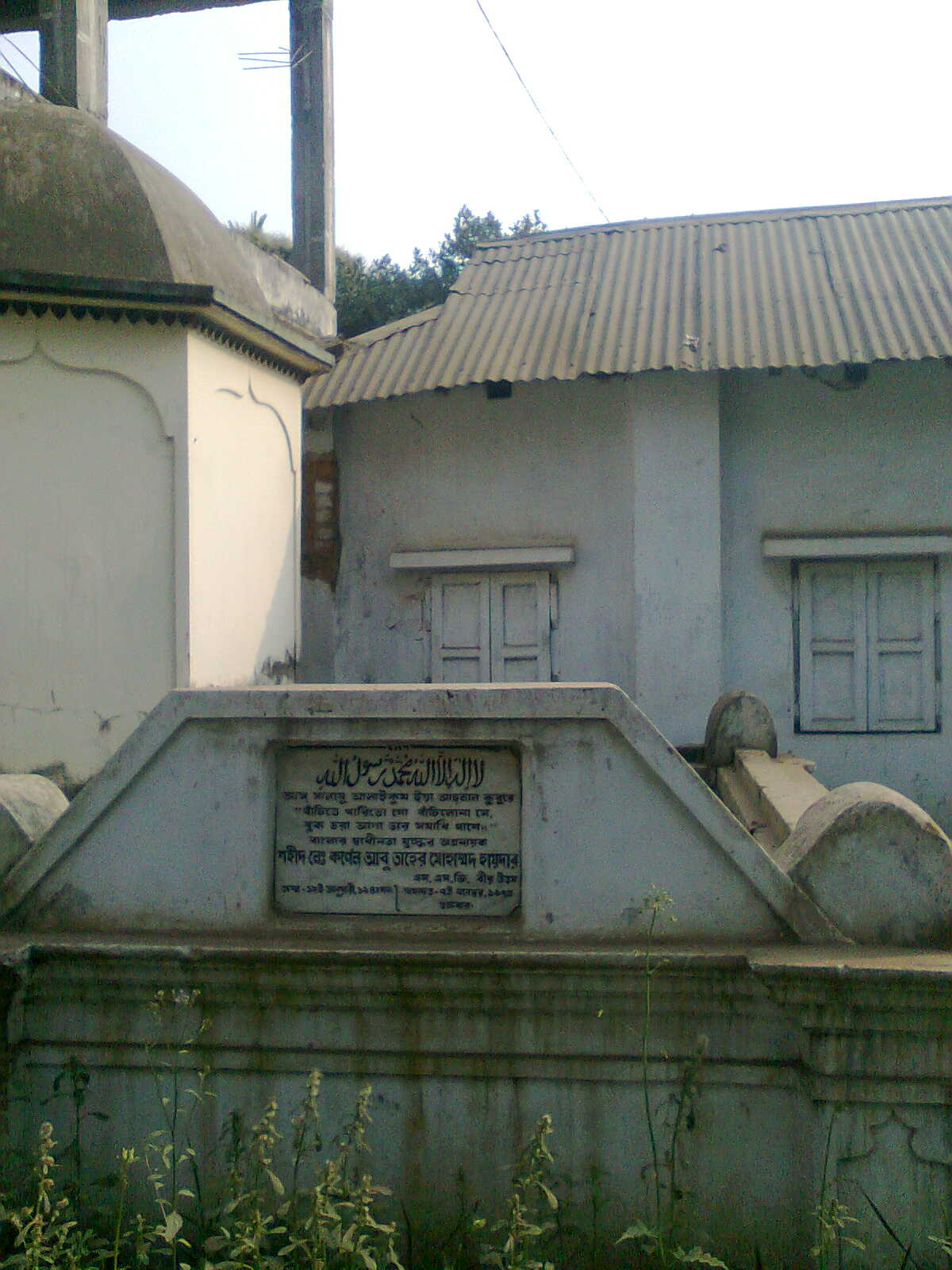
ATM Haider's tomb in Sholakia.

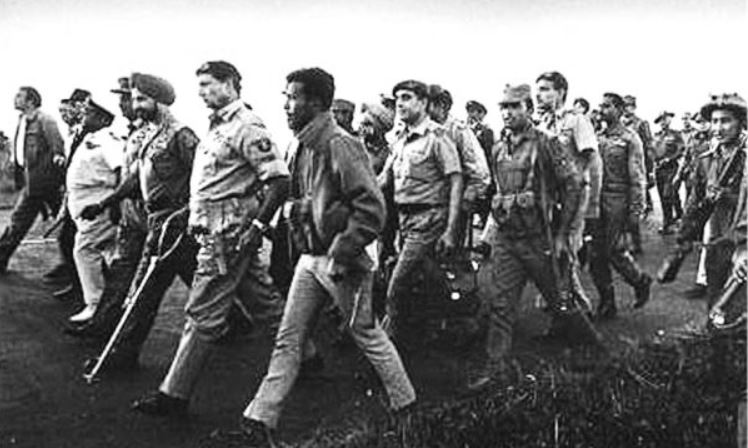
Major Haider walking alongside the Pakistani and Indian generals to the signing of instrument of surrender on 16 Dec 1971

Abu Taher Mohammad Haider (12 January 1942 – 7 November 1975) was a Bangladesh Army officer and recipient of the Bir Uttom, the second highest military award in Bangladesh. He fought in the Bangladesh Liberation War as the second-in-command of the K force under Khaled Mosharraf. Later he became the sector commander of sector-2 from 22 September 1971. After the assassination of the president of Bangladesh, Sheikh Mujib in a military coup; he joined a counter coup led by his former commander Major General Khaled Mosharraf. He was killed in a situation marred with confusion along with Khaled Mosharraf on 7 November 1975 by proponents of a counter coup led by Colonel Abu Taher.

== Early life ==
Haider was born in Bhowanipore, Kolkata, West Bengal, on 12 January 1942. His father Mohammad Israil was a sub inspector in the Kolkata Police after which he worked as a lawyer; his mother was Hakimun Nesa. He studied in Binapani Primary School, Pabna. He graduated from Ramananda Government High School and Gov't Gurudayal College, Kishoreganj. He did his undergraduate in Lahore Islamia College and completed his graduate studies in 1963 from the Punjab University.

== Career ==
After finishing his BSc graduate studies in physics, he joined the Pakistan Army as a commissioned officer. He graduated from Pakistan Military Academy and commissioned in 23 Frontier Force Regiment. Later he joined the 3rd Commando Battalion SSG. He was posted at Pano Aqil, Kotli, and at Multan Cantonment where he stayed until 1969. On 9 September 1970, he was promoted to captain. He was transferred to Comilla Cantonment.

Two days after the start of Operation Searchlight began, on 27 March 1971 he left Comilla Cantonment. In Brahmanbaria he met with officers from the fourth East Bengal Regiment. He went through Teliapara tea garden to India. He returned from India with few Mukti Bahini members. He sabotaged the Mymensingh–Kishoreganj highway and the Musalli Bridge. On 7 October 1971, he joined K force under Khaled Mosharraf as his second-in-command. His unit was mostly composed of students whom he trained in guerrilla warfare. Most of the guerrilla attacks in this sector were carried under his command.

Major Haider arrived in Bangladesh from India in a helicopter with freedom fighter and political adviser of Sector 2 and 3, R. K. Chowdhury, on 14 December in Comilla. Victory was celebrated on 15 December in Jatrabari. The crowd, carrying Major Haider and Chowdhury on their heads, rejoiced at the crossroads of Jatrabari.

He was present during the surrender of Pakistan Army on 16 December 1971. After the Independence of Bangladesh, he was promoted to major and made the commanding officer of 13 East Bengal Regiment, Savar Cantonment in 1972. He was promoted to lieutenant colonel in 1974 and was transferred to Chittagong Cantonment. On 21 October 1975 he was transferred to Ramu Cantonment.

== Death ==
After the assassination of Sheikh Mujibur Rahman there was confusion in the army. He was in Dhaka with his batman, Naik Shamsul Haq, Bir Protik for personal reasons on 3 November when Major General Khaled Mosharraf launched a coup to remove the assassins of Sheikh Mujib from power. He was assassinated with his former commander Mosharraf on 7 November 1975 in Dhaka Cantonment in the subsequent coup by Colonel Abu Taher. According to Captain (Rtd) Sitara Rahman (Bir Protik, also sister of Major Haider), General Osmani earlier advised Haider to approach Major General Zia together with Khaled Mosharraf, for hope of negotiation, reminding him that all of them had fought together hand in hand in the 1971 war. Ziaur Rahman who had been confined in cantonment from 3 November to 6 November, was freed by supporters of Colonel Taher at very early hours of 7 November. However, in a fast-moving spiral of events, Haider along with Mosharraf and Colonel Huda, along with their batmen, were killed by few army officers, early hours on 7 November. Haider was buried in his hometown in Kishoreganj.
