= Assassination of Khaled Mosharraf =

1975 murder in Dhaka, Bangladesh

Major General Khaled Mosharraf was assassinated on November 7, 1975. He was a Bangladeshi military officer who was the Sector Commander of Bangladesh Forces Sector 2 and K-Force Brigade Commander during the Bangladesh Liberation War.

Khaled Mosharraf was killed along with two fellow officers after an attempted coup that went futile after a counter-coup.

== Background ==
On August 15, 1975, Sheikh Mujibur Rahman was assassinated by sundry officers of Bangladesh Army. After the assassination, Khondaker Mostaq Ahmad took oath as the President of Bangladesh according to the prescription of the killer officers. They captured the Bangabhaban (president's official residence) and started dictating the President, causing fresh chaos in the new nation.

Mosharraf decided to stop the killers residing inside the Bangabhaban and staged a coup d'état among the Bangladesh Army. He declared himself the Chief of Military Staff on November 3, 1975. According to his order the Chief of Military Staff of the Bangladesh Army Major General Ziaur Rahman was put under house arrest. On November 6, Mosharraf was selected as one of the Deputy Chief Martial Law Administrators.

On November 7, 1975, the soldiers of Bangladesh Army staged a mutiny.

== Plot ==
The plot to kill Mosharraf, as well as some senior officers including Colonel Shafaat Jamil, was a part of the plot to stage the November 7 coup.

After the November 3 coup was staged by Mosharraf with the help of Colonel Shafaat Jamil, the Chief of Biplobi Sainik Sanstha (Revolutionary Soldiers' Establishment) Colonel Abu Taher took steps to organize a counter coup to free Major General Ziaur Rahman and establish a classless military in Bangladesh like the People's Liberation Army of China.

Abu Taher using his Biplobi Sainik Sanstha started propagating against Mosharraf, Shafaat Jamil, Colonel Nazmul Huda and other November 3 coup leaders as Indian agents. They distributed leaflets to the soldiers agitating them against Mosharraf and their anti-Indian sentiment to prove him as an agent of India. Taher also used the popularity of detained Ziaur Rahman to convince the ordinary soldiers to revolt against the establishment of officers in Bangladesh Army.

In addition, the members of Biplobi Sainik Sanstha were thoroughly directed by their leader to shoot down Mosharraf and Jamil at any instant.

Jamil, who was serving as the Brigade Commander of 46 Infantry Brigade of Bangladesh Army at Dhaka cantonment came to know about the plot while leaving the cantonment for Bangabhaban after receiving a phone call from Mosharraf at 10 PM on the night of November 6, 1975. The Brigade Major Hafiz and a Junior Commissioned Officer of 1st East Bengal Regiment confirmed him about the deadly plan of Biplobi Sainik Sanstha.

Jamil rushed to the Bangabhaban and described the plot to the newly appointed Chief of Staff who was messed up with some political issues. Mosharraf turned a deaf ear and eased the coup.

== Events ==
The assassination of Mosharraf is linked with several events that took place during the night of November 6, 1975. Conspirators from different corners wanted to finish off the officers that night.

Hours before the November 7 mutiny was kicked off Mosharraf was at Bangabhaban. He was arguing with the Chief of Bangladesh Navy, Commodore M. H. Khan and the Chief of Bangladesh Air Force, Air Vice Marshal Muhammad Ghulam Tawab regarding the distribution of power among them under the Martial Law. Jamil was called to solve the issue. When Jamil told Mosharraf about the nascent coup in the cantonment, Mosharraf did not take it seriously and continued his talk with the officers.

Mosharraf got a call from the Dhaka Cantonment. He was informed about the mutiny in the cantonment on that call. He left the Bangabhaban without wasting a second along with Colonel Haider and Colonel Huda. He also asked Jamil to stay in the Bangabhaban.

Ziaur Rahman was freed minutes after the coup was launched. Rahman was taken to the office of 2nd Field Artillery Regiment. The Chief of Staff asked the soldiers and junior officers to call all the senior officers. He firmly ordered that he wants no further bloodshed. Jamil got a phone call from the Rahman around 3 AM. Rahman asked him to reconcile.

When the entire cantonment was celebrating the leader of the abortive coup, Mosharraf and his two fellows were travelling in a car in search of a safe place. They went to the resident of former Jatiya Rakkhi Bahini Chief Colonel Nuruzzaman at 2 AM. They changed their clothes there. While staying at the place Mosharraf heard gunfire. The driver of their car, Amir was panicked and started shouting.

Mosharraf discharged the driver and asked Huda to drive the car. Then they went to the house of a relative of Mosharraf. Mosharraf called some individuals using the land phone of his relative. At first he inquired about the situation in 4th East Bengal Regiment to Lieutenant Kamrul who picked up his phone call. Kamrul told him the situation. Later he called Colonel Nawazish Ahmed of 10th East Bengal Regiment. Ahmed assured him of security.

After being assured of his security, Mosharraf started for the camp of 10th East Bengal Regiment at Sher-e-Bangla Nagar. On their way to Sher-e-Bangla Nagar, Huda met an accident. They went to a clinic named Fatima Nursing Home of Mohammadpur. Then they walked to the camp of 10th East Bengal Regiment. When they reached the camp, some soldiers of the regiment stopped them and took away their guns.

Ahmed informed Rahman about the presence of Mosharraf in his camp. Knowing this, Rahman asked Nawazish to ensure the security of Mosharraf and to protect him from any possible assault. He also urged them not to panic. Then he talked with Major Jalil, another officer of the regiment and directed him to assist Nawazish to save the trio. Colonel Taher, who was in the room with Rahman while he was talking to Colonel Nawazish, went out at some point for almost 15 minutes after he came to know about the exact location of Mosharraf.

== Assassination ==
Nawazish, after getting assurance of the Chief of Staff, arranged some breakfast for the officers. Just as the three men were being served the breakfast some other men in uniform, probably Taher's Biplobi Sainik Sanstha personnel, rushed into the room, forced the three out at gunpoint, then shot and bayoneted them to death.

According to some internal military sources, some of the Biplobi Sainik Sanstha personnel gave the message to kill all three officers to Colonel Asaduzzaman who allegedly led the assassination.

== See also ==
- Bangladesh: A Legacy of Blood
- Deyal
