= Abu Sadat Mohammad Sayem =

President of Bangladesh from 1975 to 1977

Mirza Abu Sadat Mohammad Sayem
- আবু সাদাত মোহাম্মদ সায়েম
- President Abu Sadat Mohammad Sayem

President of Bangladesh
- In office 6 November 1975 – 21 April 1977
- Prime Minister: None
- Vice President: None
- Preceded by: Khondaker Mostaq Ahmad
- Succeeded by: Ziaur Rahman

2nd Chief Martial Law Administrator
- In office 6 November 1975 – 29 November 1976
- President: Himself
- Deputy: Ziaur Rahman
- Preceded by: Khaled Mosharraf
- Succeeded by: Ziaur Rahman

1st Chief Justice of Bangladesh
- In office 12 January 1972 – 6 November 1975
- President: Abu Sayeed Chowdhury; Mohammad Mohammadullah; Sheikh Mujibur Rahman; Khondaker Mostaq Ahmad
- Prime Minister: Sheikh Mujibur Rahman; Muhammad Mansur Ali
- Preceded by: Position established
- Succeeded by: Syed A. B. Mahmud Hossain

Personal details
- Born: 29 March 1916 Rangpur, Bengal, British India
- Died: 8 July 1997 (aged 81) Dhaka, Bangladesh
- Education: Presidency College, Calcutta; University of Calcutta

Mirza Abu Sadat Mohammad Sayem (Note: Bengali: আবু সাদাত মোহাম্মদ সায়েম, romanized: Abu Sādāt Mohammad Śāyem [ˈabu ˈsɑd̪at ˈmoɦɑmmɔd ˈʃɑjem]) (29 March 1916 – 8 July 1997) was a Bangladeshi jurist and statesman. He was the chief justice of Bangladesh from 1972 to 1975. He became the president of Bangladesh in the aftermath of counter-coups in November 1975. He held the post of Chief Martial Law Administrator (CMLA). Sayem presided over a cabinet headed by the three chiefs of the armed forces. The cabinet included civilian technocrats and politicians. Sayem resigned on grounds of ill health in April 1977 and was replaced by Ziaur Rahman.

== Early life and education ==
Sayem was born on 29 March 1916 in Rangpur district, Bengal Presidency, British India, to Mohammad Abdur Rashid and Syeda Rabea Khatun. His father was a sub-register. He passed his matriculation from the Rangpur District School, securing 3rd place in the merit list in 1931. He completed his Intermediate of Arts from Carmichael College in 1933. He later attended Presidency College in Calcutta, where he completed his Bachelor of Arts degree in 1935. In 1937 he graduated from the Department of Law, University of Calcutta with an LL.B degree.

== Career ==
Sayem started working as an advocate at the Calcutta High Court in 1944. After the partition of India in 1947, he moved to Dhaka, East Bengal, Pakistan. He joined the newly established Dhaka High Court. He joined the law firm Sher-e-Bangla AK Fazlul Huq as a junior advocate. He was first elected secretary and later vice-president of the Dhaka High Court Bar Association. He would also be elected secretary, secretary general, and vice-president of the East Pakistan Lawyers' Association.

Sayem was also elected to the local board of the State Bank of Pakistan. He was appointed judge in the Dhaka High Court on 3 July 1962. He served on the commission of enquiry for finding out the causes of the exodus and eviction of the members of the minority community in 1967. In 1970, he was appointed to the Delimitation Commission responsible for the delimitation of parliamentary constituencies. He was appointed to the Election Commission.

In 1971, Bangladesh became an independent country following the Bangladesh War of Independence. On 12 January 1972, Sayem was made the chief justice of the Bangladesh High Court. On 17 December 1972, he was made the chief justice of Bangladesh following the creation of the Bangladesh Supreme Court. He gave the verdict on the important Berubari Case concerning the exchange of enclaves between Bangladesh and India.

Sayem assumed the office of president and chief martial law administrator on 6 November 1975, following the 3 November 1975 Bangladesh coup d'état by Brigadier General Khaled Mosharraf. On 29 November 1976, he removed himself from the office of the chief martial law administrator (CMLA) and was replaced by Major General Ziaur Rahman, Chief of Army Staff. Zia had pressured him into resigning from his role as CMLA, with the support of the other service chiefs, Deputy Army Chief Major General Ershad, Brigadier General Manzur, and Brigadier General Mir Shawkat Ali. On 21 April 1977, he resigned from the presidency of Bangladesh on health grounds. Major General—later Lieutenant General—Ziaur Rahman eventually succeeded him as the president of Bangladesh.

== Death ==
He died on 8 July 1997 in Dhaka, Bangladesh.
