= Military coups in Bangladesh =

Coups d'état executed by the military in Bangladesh

Bangladesh has undergone several changes of government since the Proclamation of Independence in 1971. Between the first recorded coup in August 1975 and the 2009 Bangladesh Rifles revolt, Bangladesh has been through as many as 29 military coups.

== 1975 coups ==
=== 15 August ===
The 15 August 1975 Bangladesh coup d'état was a military coup launched by mid ranking army officers in Bangladesh on 15 August 1975. The officers planned to put an end to the socialist one-party state regime of Sheikh Mujibur Rahman with a nationalist democratic government led by Khandaker Mushtaque Ahmed. Sheikh Mujib and most of his family members were killed in the coup.

=== 3 November ===
Khondaker Mostaq Ahmad was removed from power in a coup on 3 November 1975. This was organized by Brigadier Khaled Mosharraf, Bir Uttom, a decorated veteran of the Bangladesh war of Independence in 1971. Commotion and misinformation spread across the power circles in Dhaka. Mosharraf was seen by many as a supporter of Sheikh Mujib's government. He put Major General Ziaur Rahman, the Chief of Army Staff and fellow independence War leader, who was not believed to have supported the August coup, under house arrest but did not execute him. Some commentators said that the personal friendship between the two officers led to Mosharraf sparing Rahman's life.

=== 7 November ===
The 7 November 1975 Bangladesh coup d'état was a coup d'état launched by left wing army personnel in collaboration with left-wing politicians from Jatiya Samajtantrik Dal. The coup killed Khaled Mosharraf who had removed those involved in the Assassination of Sheikh Mujibur Rahman from power. Following it, a military junta interim government led by Chief Justice Abu Sadat Mohammad Sayem was formed.

== 1977–1980 failed attempts ==
Ziaur Rahman survived as many as 21 assassination attempts beginning since the war of Independence in 1971. He was killed in the final attempt by army officers on May 30, 1981. Assassination attempts were being conspired by at least one outside nation. Many facts and rumours abounded. From 30 September 1977 till 2 October, a series of incidents occurred in an attempt to remove the Zia Administration from power. The incident initiated in the hijacked JAL flight from India that was force landed in Dhaka with 156 passengers as hostages. Jessore and Bogra Cantonment reacted from the disinformation which led to the chaos and commotion resulting from the JAL flt. 472 hijacking incident. BAF and BD Army officers were assassinated including many other members. The rebellion was put down and Zia administration was saved. The JAL flight force landed in Dhaka international airport in Tejgaon fully armed with Japanese Red army men who took off from Delhi, India.

By 2 October 1977, another revolt erupted, after eleven Air Force officers were murdered by the Red Army men two days before. But they failed in the attempt. Following this, the coup had begun. An estimated 2,500-armed forces personnel were executed following convictions in courts martial for their part in the coup. Officially 1,183 soldiers were convicted. 561 were Bangladesh Air Force airmen and rest were Army soldiers.

== 1982 coup ==
During his term of power, Zia continued to enjoy overall popularity and public confidence. Supporters of the Awami League and veterans of the independence war continued to undermine his actions. Amidst speculation Zia went on tour to Chittagong on May 29, 1981, to help resolve an intra-party-political dispute in the regional Bangladesh National Party. Zia and his entourage stayed overnight at the Chittagong Circuit House, a rest house. In the early hours of the morning of May 30, he was assassinated by a group of army officers, who also killed six of his bodyguards and two aides.

After the Assassination of Ziaur Rahman on 30 May 1981, the then Chief of Army Staff Lieutenant General Hussain Muhammad Ershad, started to distance himself from the civilian government in place. He ordered the army to suppress any investigation of Zia's assassination. Ershad did not spare any chance of Major General Abul Manzur's trial or investigation. Manzur surrendered and immediately was taken in cantonment. Twelve hours later, he was executed. Upon Zia's assassination, Ershad ultimately got rid of a major section of Independence War participants from the army and buried any traces of evidence that could incriminate him.

Zia was buried at the Chandrima Uddan in the locality of Sher-e-Banglanagar in Dhaka. Large processions of the public across the nation along with supporters and BNP activists attended the funeral. Vice president Abdus Sattar immediately succeeded him as the acting president.

Presidential Oath Taking Ceremony after 1986 elections, the Chief Justice and Military Secretary (1984-1989) Brigadier ABM Elias is also seen

Lieutenant General Ershad expressed loyalty to the new president Abdus Sattar, who led the Bangladesh Nationalist Party (BNP) to victory in elections in 1981.

Soon after the BNP government continued with Zia's policies and moved on with the business of governing. Lt. Gen. Ershad waited for the right signals to grab to power.

In a bloodless coup on 24 March 1982, Ershad stormed into Bangabhaban and at gunpoint removed President Sattar from office and proclaimed himself Chief Martial Law Administrator (CMLA), and suspended the constitution. He took over as president on 11 December 1983 by replacing A. F. M. Ahsanuddin Chowdhury.

== 1996 coup attempt ==
Lieutenant General Abu Saleh Mohammad Nasim staged an abortive coup in 1996 against the caretaker government. On 19 May 1996, Abdur Rahman Biswas, the President of Bangladesh during a caretaker government, ordered Nasim to force the retirement of two senior army officers. The President believed that they were involved in political activities with opposition parties. Nasim refused to comply.

The next day, Biswas sacked him and sent soldiers to control the state radio and television stations. On noon that day, General Nasim ordered soldiers of Bogra, Jessore and Mymensingh divisions to march towards Dhaka.

The Ninth Infantry Division's Major General Imamuzzaman, who commanded the division located closest to Dhaka, remained loyal to the President. He directed the removal of all boats and ferries from Jamuna River in Aricha port, so that Bogra and Jessore divisions could not cross the river. He sent a contingent of troops with tanks to blockade the Dhaka-Mymenshing highway. This prevented Mymensingh Division Army from entering Dhaka.

In the meantime, Major General Mohammad Anwar Hossain, General Officer Commanding of the 33rd Infantry Division located in Comilla, also came to the aid of the president. He mobilized a fully geared 101 Infantry Brigade, under the command of Brig. Shah Ikram (later Maj. Gen.) to Dhaka to fortify Bangabhaban, the presidential palace. The 33rd Division was deployed, using an Infantry Battalion and a company of tanks from the 7th Horse Armoured Battalion at the Dhaka-Chittagong highway, to create a blockade against the 24th Infantry Division located in Chittagong.

The government broadcast announcements asking all soldiers to stay at their own cantonment. After some hours, Mymensingh Division soldiers returned to their barracks. The Chittagong Division never mobilized towards Dhaka. The General Officer Commanding of the Chittagong Division realized that the military coup was highly unlikely to succeed. That night Nasim was interviewed by the BBC and, in reference to troop movements, he said that as Army Chief, he could move troops any time he wanted.

Nasim was arrested by the Brigade Commander of 14 Independent Engineers Brigade and put under house arrest in the Army Mess behind Army Central Library, Staff road, Dhaka Cantonment. Later Awami League government, which was elected to power in 1996, granted him a formal retirement. Since then, he has remained a private citizen.

== 2007 coup against caretaker government ==
Army Chief Lt. Gen Moeen U. Ahmed staged a military coup on 11 January 2007. The military-backed Caretaker Government (CTG) was formed outside the constitutional provisions. Fakhruddin Ahmed was made head of government. President Iajuddin Ahmed had to run the presidency at gun point during said army rule. Lt. Gen. Moeen upgraded the Army Chief of Staff's rank to General. Moeen extended the rule of the CTG for two years and his tenure as army chief for one year. The coup ended in 2008 after the military government held a parliamentary election in December 2008 and transfer of power was handed over to the Awami League, which won 230 seats in parliament.

== 2009 Bangladesh Rifles revolt ==
The Bangladesh Rifles revolt was a mutiny staged on 25 and 26 February 2009 in Dhaka by a section of the Bangladesh Rifles (BDR), a paramilitary force mainly tasked with guarding the borders of Bangladesh. The rebelling BDR soldiers took over the BDR headquarters in Pilkhana, killing the BDR Director-General Shakil Ahmed along with 56 other army officers and 17 civilians. They also fired on civilians, held many of their officers and their families hostage, vandalised property and looted valuables. By the second day, unrest had spread to 12 other towns and cities. The mutiny ended as the mutineers surrendered their arms and released the hostages after a series of discussions and negotiations with the government.

== 2011 Bangladesh coup attempt ==
The 2011 Bangladesh coup attempt was a coup planned for 11–12 January 2012 that was stopped by the Bangladesh Army in December 2011. This was announced at a press conference on 19 January 2012. The purpose of the coup was to establish Islamic law in Bangladesh. A number of officers including retired ones were arrested. The coup plotters argued that they were nationalists trying to prevent Bangladesh from being turned into a puppet of India.

== See also ==
- Abu Taher
- Assassination of Sheikh Mujibur Rahman
- Hasanul Haq Inu
- Hussain Muhammad Ershad
- Sheikh Hasina
- Sheikh Mujibur Rahman
- List of coups and coup attempts by country
