= Khondkar Nazmul Huda =

Bangladesh Liberation army

- খন্দকার নাজমুল হুদা
- Born: 6 July 1938; Nagarkanda, Bengal, British India (present day Nagarkanda, Faridpur District, Bangladesh)
- Died: 7 November 1975 (aged 37); Dhaka, Bangladesh
- Children: Naheed Ezaher Khan
- Military career
- Allegiance: Bangladesh; Pakistan (before 1971)
- Branch: Bangladesh Army; Pakistan Army
- Service years: 1962–1975
- Rank: Colonel
- Unit: Corps of Engineers
- Commands: Sub-Commander of Sector - VIII; Director of Engineers Directorate, Army Headquarters; Commander of 44th Infantry Brigade; Commander of 72nd Infantry Brigade
- Conflicts: Bangladesh Liberation War; Battle of Garibpur; Second Siege of Dhaka †
- Awards: Bir Bikrom

Khondkar Nazmul Huda (6 July 1938 – 7 November 1975) was a veteran of the Bangladesh Liberation War. The Bangladesh government awarded him the title of Bir Bikrom for his bravery in the war of independence.

== Early life ==
Huda's ancestral home is in Kodalia village of Nagarkanda upazila of Faridpur district. His father's name was Khandaker Moazzem Hossain, and his mother's name was Badrun Nesha Khatun. His wife's name is Nilufar Huda. They have one son, Ehtesham Huda, and one daughter, Naheed Ezaher Khan, who was elected as an Awami League member of parliament for a reserved women's seat in the 11th National Assembly in 2019.

== Career ==
Huda was commissioned in the Corps of Engineers in the Pakistan Army with the 25th PMA Long Course on 21 April 1962. For some time in 1964-65, he worked as a platoon leader under Lt. General Javed Nasir as company commander. On January 3, 1968, he was arrested along with many others as accused in the Agartala Conspiracy Case. He was the 26th accused. In 1969, he was acquitted along with Sheikh Mujibur Rahman. But was dismissed.

When the Bangladesh Liberation War started, he jumped into this war. He was then included in the Bangladesh Army as a major of the East Bengal Regiment. After the assassination of Sheikh Mujibur Rahman in 1975, he was killed along with Khaled Musharraf and ATM Haider in the November coup.

=== Liberation war ===
Barni BOP of Chaugachha upazila in Jessore district was a base of an under-strength company of the Pakistan Army's 33rd Punjabis. There were about 75 Pakistani soldiers with 3 3-inch mortars. Due to that base, the Mukti Bahini personnel could not operate in the area. In early August, Khandaker Nazmul Huda decided to attack. On 5 August 1971, two companies of freedom fighters, led by a platoon of the 1st East Bengal Regiment under his leadership, attacked the base. The Pakistan Army retreated from the camp, leaving behind 15 bodies. The Pakistan Army launched a counterattack, and Huda had to defend the taken base.

Huda was the sub-sector commander of Boyra of Sector 8. A number of battles took place in the sub-sector. On 20–21 November, a fierce battle took place with the Pakistani forces at Garibpur in Chougachha. Besides, the Mukti Bahini carried out numerous ambushes, demolitions, and surprise attacks.

== Death and legacy ==
Huda was killed in the 7 November 1975 Bangladesh coup d'état; he had the rank of colonel in the Bangladesh Army.

In May 2023, Huda's daughter, Naheed Ezaher Khan, filed a murder case with the Sher-e-Bangla Nagar police station in Dhaka in connection with the killing. The case accused Major Mohammad Abdul Jalil of the then 10th East Bengal Regiment and 20-25 others. The case also mentioned the then chief of army staff and later president of Bangladesh, Ziaur Rahman, as the mastermind who gave instructions to kill Huda.

Huda is commemorated by renaming a road in Dhaka as Bir Bikrom Shahid Colonel Khondkar Nazmul Huda Sarak.
