= 3 November 1975 Bangladeshi coup d'état =

1975 military coup in Bangladesh

- Part of the military coups in Bangladesh
Date	3 November 1975
Location	Dhaka, Bangladesh
Result	Coup successful: Khondaker Mostaq Ahmad deposed; Ziaur Rahman house arrested; Four national leaders assassinated

Belligerents
Bangladesh Armed Forces	Government of Bangladesh

Commanders and leaders
(Bangladesh) Khaled Mosharraf; Supported by: (Bangladesh) Shafaat Jamil; (Bangladesh) Abu Taher Mohammad Haider; (Bangladesh) Khondkar Nazmul Huda	(Bangladesh) Khondaker Mostaq Ahmad (surrendered) (POW); (Bangladesh) M.A.G Osmani; Backed by: (Bangladesh) Abdul Majed; (Bangladesh) Syed Faruque Rahman; (Bangladesh) Khandaker Abdur Rashid; (Bangladesh) Shariful Haque Dalim

Units involved
Bangladesh Army; 46th Independent Infantry Brigade; 10 East Bengal Regiment; Bangladesh Air Force; No. 5 Squadron	1st Bengal Lancers; 2nd Field Artillery Regiment

The 3 November 1975 Bangladeshi coup d'état was organised by Brig. Khaled Mosharraf against President Khondaker Mostaq Ahmad to remove him from the presidency and the assassins of Sheikh Mujibur Rahman from power: Capt. Abdul Majed, Maj. Syed Faruque Rahman, Maj. Khandaker Abdur Rashid, and Maj. Shariful Haque Dalim. The coup resulted in a return of Mujibist forces in Bangladeshi politics for a short time.

The coup was the result of a power struggle between the regime of Mostaq Ahmed and the mid-ranking officers backing him, Majed, Faruque, Rashid, and Dalim, and Mosharraf and the high-ranking officers supporting him, Col. Shafaat Jamil, Lt. Col. Abu Taher Mohammad Haider, and Col. Khondkar Nazmul Huda. The high-ranking officers were worried about army discipline with "junior mutinous officers issuing orders from the presidential palace". With the coup, Mosharraf promoted himself to the rank of major general and the post of Chief of Army Staff after placing Maj. Gen. Ziaur Rahman under house arrest while the mid-ranking officers went on exile, as was agreed upon between the belligerents. The coup lasted 3 days, after which Abu Sadat Mohammad Sayem was installed as president while Mosharraf served as the Chief Martial Law Administrator. The coup resulted in the death of four national leaders of Bangladesh: Syed Nazrul Islam, former vice president and acting president of Bangladesh; Tajuddin Ahmad, former prime minister of Bangladesh; Muhammad Mansur Ali, former prime minister of Bangladesh; and Abul Hasnat Muhammad Qamaruzzaman, former home minister of Bangladesh.

== Background ==
A military coup was launched in Bangladesh on 15 August 1975, by mid-ranking army officers in order to assassinate President Sheikh Mujibur Rahman. Sheikh Mujibur Rahman, also known as Bangabandhu (lit. 'Friend of Bengal') or Mujib, was the country's founding president, but post-independence his administration grew corrupt and reportedly 'increasingly authoritarian' until he formed a 'one-party state' led by the socialist Bangladesh Krishak Sramik Awami League. Mujib was killed during the coup, along with many of his family members who were living in Bangladesh at the time, but he was survived by his two then-expat daughters, one of whom was future prime minister Sheikh Hasina. The officers were led by Capt. Abdul Majed, Major Syed Faruque Rahman, Major Khandaker Abdur Rashid and Major Shariful Haque Dalim.

Khondaker Mostaq Ahmad, one of Mujib's close associates and cabinet ministers, took control of the government immediately following the coup with the support of the officers and declared himself President of Bangladesh. Under martial law, he made a proclamation on 20 August to amend the constitution to omit the provision for the legal basis for the one-party system. He reportedly praised the assassin officers, calling them "Children of the Sun", and proclaimed the Indemnity Ordinance, which granted them immunity from prosecution. They were all later toppled by a counter-coup on 3 November 1975.

The principle instigator of the coup to dethrone the killers of Sheikh Mujib, Brig. Khaled Mosharraf, started out as a Bengali officer in the Pakistan Army. He joined the Mukti Bahini after the start of Bangladesh War. He was appointed by the Mujibnagar Government to lead Sector 2 of the Mukti Bahini. He survived a bullet wound to his head during the war and was provided treatment in Lucknow, India. After Bangladesh became an independent country, he was awarded Bir Uttom by the government of Bangladesh for his role in the war. Following the coup, he became the chief of staff of the Bangladesh Army.

== Events ==
After the assassination of Sheikh Mujibur Rahman, the assassins had established their government in Bangabhaban (the Presidential Palace) under Mostaq Ahmad. On 3 November 1975, Brig. Mosharraf launched a coup to remove the assassins from power and Mostaq Ahmad from the Presidency. Khaled Mosharraf was being supported by Colonel Shafaat Jamil, the brigade commander of 46th Independent Infantry Brigade based in Dhaka. They were worried about army discipline with "junior mutinous officers" Abdul Majed, Syed Faruque Rahman, Khandaker Abdur Rashid, and Shariful Haque Dalim "issuing orders from the presidential palace". Mosharraf and the then-Chief of Army Staff, Maj. Gen. Ziaur Rahman, disagreed on when to remove the rebels from power. Khaled wanted it to be done as soon as possible, while Zia wanted to wait till heavy armoured vehicles were removed from the Presidential Palace. He used the helicopters of Bangladesh Air Force to scare the rebels held up in the Presidential Palace. As it appeared a military confrontation was imminent, Air Vice-Marshal Muhammad Ghulam Tawab, the Chief of the Air Staff, was able to convince the rebels to negotiate their way out of power. Tawab was appointed to his position by the rebels after the assassination of Sheikh Mujibur Rahman. The rebels agreed on the conditions that they be provided safe passage to Thailand.

On 4 November 1975, Khaled was promoted to Major General and made the Chief of Army Staff. Ziaur Rahman was forced to retire from service and placed under house arrest in Dhaka Cantonment. Justice Abu Sadat Mohammad Sayem, the Chief Justice of Bangladesh, was made president and replaced Khondaker Mostaq. Khaled Mosharraf ordered the arrests of KM Obaidur Rahman, Nurul Islam Manzur, Shah Moazzam Hossain, and Taheruddin Thakur, who were Awami League politicians who had aligned themselves with Mostaq Ahmad.

== Aftermath ==
=== Jail Killing ===
On 3 November 1975, before the rebels went on exile, they killed four Awami League leaders in jail: Syed Nazrul Islam, former vice president and acting president of Bangladesh, Tajuddin Ahmad, former prime minister of Bangladesh, Muhammad Mansur Ali, former prime minister of Bangladesh, and Abul Hasnat Muhammad Qamaruzzaman, former home minister of Bangladesh.

=== Counter-coup ===
Brig. Gen. Khaled Mosharraf was killed in a counter-coup resulting from Sipahi-Janata Revolution led by Col. Abu Taher with the support of Jatiya Samajtantrik Dal. Col. Huda and Lt. Col. Haider were also killed in the coup. The officers were visiting the 10th East Bengal Regiment when they were killed by the soldiers of the regiment. The coup also freed and reinstated Maj. Gen. Zia, who would later go on to become president in 1977.

== Legacy ==
Awami League observes 3 November as Jail Killing Day due to the killing of the four national leaders in Dhaka Central Jail.
