= Abu Taher =

Bangladeshi military officer and insurgent (1938–1976)

Mohammad Abu Taher BU
- মোহাম্মদ আবু তাহের
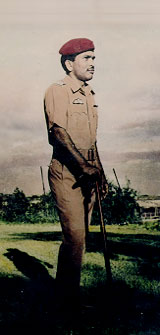

Personal details
- Born: 14 November 1938 Badarpur, Assam, British India
- Died: 21 July 1976 (aged 37) Dhaka Central Jail, Dhaka, Bangladesh
- Cause of death: Execution by hanging
- Party: Jatiyo Samajtantrik Dal
- Spouse: Lutfa Taher
- Relations: M. Anwar Hossain (brother)
- Children: 3
- Education: Murari Chand College; Military Training; Pakistan Military Academy
- Awards: Bir Uttom

Military service
- Allegiance: Pakistan (1961–1971); Mukti Bahini (1971–1972); Bangladesh (1972)
- Branch/service: Pakistan Army; Bangladesh Army
- Years of service: 1961-1972
- Rank: Lieutenant colonel
- Unit: Baloch Regiment; Special Service Group
- Commands: Commander of Sector XI
- Battles/wars: Indo-Pakistani War of 1965; Bangladesh Liberation War; Indo-Pakistani War of 1971; Second Siege of Dhaka

Mohammad Abu Taher (Bengali: মোহাম্মদ আবু তাহের; 14 November 1938 – 21 July 1976) was a Bangladeshi military officer. He first served in the Pakistan Army before defecting to the Bangladesh Army during the Bangladesh Liberation War. He later crossed into India and reported to the Indian authorities. After a week of screening at Dehradun, he was sent to Kolkata, West Bengal. He was ordered to report to Sector 11 of Mukti Bahini under the command of Major Ziaur Rahman. He became the sector commander after Major Ziaur Rahman and served in the Bangladesh Defence Forces (BDF) for about two months, until November 1971. He was awarded the Bir Uttom Medal for gallantry in the War of Liberation. He was released from military service by an Indian military medical board in Pune, India, after his leg was amputated. After independence, he was inducted into the Bangladesh Army for administrative retirement with the legacy rank of lieutenant colonel.

After settling in with his family, the government of Bangladesh appointed him to Comilla. Later, Taher became a political activist and leader of the left-wing Jatiyo Samajtantrik Dal. He was responsible for the 7 November coup which was the third coup in 1975 in Bangladesh. After freeing Ziaur Rahman and reinstating him as army chief, many personnel, including Taher, were executed after being found guilty of high treason and murder. However, in 2011, his trial was declared illegal by the High Court of Bangladesh.

== Early life and education ==
Abu Taher was born in Badarpur, Assam Province of British India on 14 November 1938. His ancestral village was Kazla in Purbadhala, Netrokona District of Bangladesh. After the completion of higher secondary school from Murari Chand College in Sylhet, Taher joined the Pakistan Army in September 1960 as an officer candidate. After that, he was married to Lutfa Taher.

== Military career ==
Taher was commissioned into the Pakistan Army in 1961. He joined the Special Service Group in 1965. Following his training, he participated in the Indo-Pakistani War of 1965 in Sialkot. For his contributions during the war, he received a war participation medal from the Pakistan Army. After the war, Taher trained under U.S. Army Special Forces at Fort Benning in the United States in 1969. He was soon posted to the Quetta Staff College, Pakistan, in 1970.

=== Bangladesh War of Independence ===
Towards the end of August 1971, Major Taher, along with three other Bengali officers, Major Manzur, Major Ziauddin and Captain Bazlul Ghani Patwari, defected from the Pakistani Army and crossed the border near Abbottabad, West Pakistan, into India. After two weeks under Indian intelligence screening and debriefing, he was sent to the Bangladesh Armed Forces (BDF) HQ at 8 Theatre Road, Calcutta and subsequently posted to Sector 11. He was promoted to major in September 1971. Major Ziaur Rahman appointed Taher as Sub-Sector Commander No. 2 at Mahendraganj. Sector 11 was located across the Rangpur District, which comprised Mymensingh District, Tangail District and parts of Rangpur District. On 10 October, upon Major Ziaur's temporary transfer to the Sylhet sector, Major Shafayat Jamil handed over the interim command of BDF Sector 11. On 2 November 1971, Taher lost his leg from a small mine blast during a debriefing. Squadron Leader M. Hamidullah Khan was officially appointed Sector Commander of Sector 11 under direct orders through EAM from General Osmani, the Bangladesh Interim Provincial Government Headquarters. Taher was flown to Pune, India. On 21 November, Taher received a Medical Board Release. His leg was later amputated in Pune, where he remained until February 1972. For his valour, he was awarded Bir Uttom.

== Post-war activities ==
Following his return, Taher was reinstated into the Bangladesh Army in April for effective retirement following administrative procedure. He retired with a legacy entitlement rank of lieutenant colonel and hence is widely known as Colonel Taher.

=== Jatiyo Samajtantrik Dal ===
Abu Taher joined the Jatiyo Samajtantrik Dal, a left-wing, socialist party, sometime after its founding in 1972.

The Jatiyo Samajtantrik Dal had split from the Bangladesh Chhatra League and called for establishing socialism through an armed revolution. Taher became the head of its armed wing, the Gonobahini and led a violent insurgency campaign against the government of Sheikh Mujibur Rahman.

=== 15 August 1975 coup ===
Abu Taher supported the assassination of Sheikh Mujibur Rahman, remarking,

They've made a big mistake. They shouldn't have allowed Sheikh Mujib's burial. Now a shrine will be built there. His body should have been thrown into the Bay of Bengal.

It was known that Jatiyo Samajtantrik Dal had plans for an insurrection against Sheikh Mujib's government. After the 15 August coup, JSD encouraged its followers to study Marx's The Class Struggles in France. On the morning of the coup, Taher received several phone calls, urging him to go to Bangladesh Betar, the government radio station. Upon reaching the radio station, he met Major Rashid, one of the key organisers of Sheikh Mujib's assassination. Rashid took Taher to a room, where he saw Major Dalim, Taheruddin Thakur and Khondaker Mostaq Ahmad. Taher was invited to join the cabinet by Rashid, but he declined. Taher was present at Khondaker Mostaq Ahmad's swearing-in ceremony.

=== 3 November 1975 Coup ===
After the 15 August coup, the chain of command in the Bangladesh Army was disrupted; the majors involved in Sheikh Mujib's assassination began acting like generals. General Khaled Mosharraf urged General Ziaur Rahman to restore the chain of command, which he was either unwilling or unable to do. As a result, Khaled Mosharraf launched the 3 November coup, ousting Khondaker Mostaq Ahmad and placing Ziaur Rahman under house arrest. Before Rahman was arrested, he reportedly made a phone call to Taher, urging him to save him. Every night between 4 and 6 November, secret meetings of enlisted men and non-commissioned officers were held under Taher's leadership. These troops belonged to Biplobi Shainik Sangstha (BSS; Revolutionary Soldiers' Organisation), which was a 'socialist and egalitarian' group that clandestinely existed within the Bangladesh Army. At these meetings, they finalised plans to organise an uprising of soldiers and civilians and free Rahman from imprisonment.

=== 7 November 1975 coup ===
The 7 November coup was launched by BSS under the leadership of Abu Taher to overthrow Khaled Mosharraf. The coup began during the early hours of 7 November 1975 in Dhaka Cantonment. Many people, both civilians and low-ranking military personnel, soon joined in. The number of people who joined in the days leading up to the coup by the BSS was due partially to a campaign accusing General Mosharraf of conspiring with India against the public. The insurrection soon spread to other areas, including Rangpur and Chittagong. Crowds poured into the streets of Dhaka to support the soldiers and shouted slogans, such as 'The people and soldiers have united'. Sources say that the insurrectionists quickly overwhelmed Mosharraf's forces. Ziaur Rahman was freed from house arrest by soldiers and taken to the headquarters of the 2nd Field Artillery regiment, where he met Taher. Witnesses claim that Zia embraced Taher and thanked him for saving his life.

== Trial and execution ==
Once Ziaur Rahman regained control of the army, he realised that the soldiers' mutiny had to be suppressed if discipline was to be restored. On 24 November 1975, he ordered Taher arrested on charges of high treason and murder. Taher was tried by a military tribunal inside the Dhaka Central Jail and sentenced to death on 17 July 1976. He was executed by hanging on 21 July 1976. His last meal consisted of mangoes and tea. The Bangladesh High Court later ruled the trial illegal and described Taher's execution as a "cold-blooded assassination" in its judgment.

== High Court ruling ==
On 22 March 2011, the High Court overturned the previous judgment that had authorised Taher's execution by military tribunal while the nation was under martial law. The military court judgment was declared illegal. The court observed that Taher's execution had happened according to Major General Ziaur Rahman's plan.

== See also ==
- Bangladesh Forces
