= 1st East Bengal Regiment =

- ১ম ইস্ট বেঙ্গল রেজিমেন্ট
- East Bengal Regimental Flag; Unit Monogram
- Active: 15 February 1948 – present
- Country: Pakistan (1948–1971); Bangladesh
- Branch: Pakistan Army (1948–1971); Bangladesh Army
- Type: Infantry
- Size: Battalion
- Part of: 10th Infantry Division
- Garrison/HQ: Ramu Cantonment
- Nickname: Senior Tigers
- Mottos: Grace, Strength, Speed
- Engagements: India–Pakistan war of 1965; Battle of Kasur; Bangladesh Liberation War; Battle of Kamalpur; Battle of Sylhet; Battle of Dhalai
- Decorations: See here
- Battle honours: Pakistan 1965, Bangladesh 1971

Commanders
- Notable commanders: M. A. G. Osmani; Hafizuddin Ahmed; Moinul Hossain Chowdhury; Mohammad Ziauddin; Quazi Golam Dastgir

1st East Bengal Regiment also known by its nickname The Senior Tigers is a battalion of the Bangladesh Army.

== Background ==
1st East Bengal Regiment is the oldest battalion of the East Bengal Regiment (the first of the two infantry regiments in the Bangladeshi Army, the other being the Bangladesh Infantry Regiment). The unit was raised in 1948 at Kurmitola in Dhaka in what was then East Pakistan from two Bengal Muslim Pioneer Corps (1256 and 1407) of British Indian Army Pioneer Corps of Bihar Regiments, the war raised auxiliary force created to support the war effort in engineering and infantry role. These two companies were mainly composed of Bengali Muslims who had fought bravely in the Burma sector during the Second World War and as such had been retained by the British Government with the mainstream of the British-Indian Army. These two companies immediately after the partition of India in August 1947 moved from Jalna the Indian Pioneer Corps Centre initially to Pelkhana then to Kurmitola (which is now Dhaka Cantonment).

== Unit establishment ==
The unit was established on 15 February 1948 when Ayub Khan was serving as the general officer commanding of the 14th Infantry Division, Dhaka. The pioneer commanding officer was Lieutenant Colonel V J E Patterson, whereas the first Bengali to command the unit was Lt. Col. M. A. G. Osmani.

== Indo-Pak War of 1965 ==
The 1st EBR was deployed near the Bambawali-Ravi-Bedian Canal to protect Lahore, one of the major Pakistani cities and fought in the Battle of Kasur. The unit was then under the command of Lt. Col. ATK Haque. It was a part of the 11th Infantry Division, under 106 Infantry Brigade. Under the command of Lt Col Haque, the unit showed immense bravery in the battlefield and earned many gallantry awards. The 1st EBR was considered one of the most decorated units of that time.

== 1971 Liberation War ==
The unit was assigned at the Jessore Cantonment under 14th Infantry Division right before the 1971 War. Under the command of the then Captain Hafiz, the unit revolted against Pakistan Army. After the war began, three brigade sized formations were established and the unit was a part of the Z Force, which was being commanded by Ziaur Rahman. The unit fought in some of the major battles, including the Battle of Dhalai, Battle of Sylhet, Battle of Kamalpur and so on. The unit participated in other battles and operations at various places of the country. For the gallantry performance in the war, the unit won several gallantry awards, becoming one of the most decorated Bangladeshi units.

== Post 1971 War ==
After the 1971 War, the unit continues to serve in the army. The unit was deployed during the Gulf War as Bangladesh was a part of the collation and had sent a contingent of soldiers.

From 1979 to 1981 Lt. Col Abdul Mohit Khan commanded the battalion. His son Colonel Salahuddin Khaled got commissioned in the same unit in and later became the commanding officer (CO). It’s first in Bangladesh Army history that a father and son command the same battalion.

The unit has played crucial role in aid to civil power multiple times in the history.

== Gallantry awards ==
=== 1965 Indo-Pakistani War ===
Under the command of Lt Col ATK Haque, the unit won the following gallantry awards for showing courageous acts in western front.

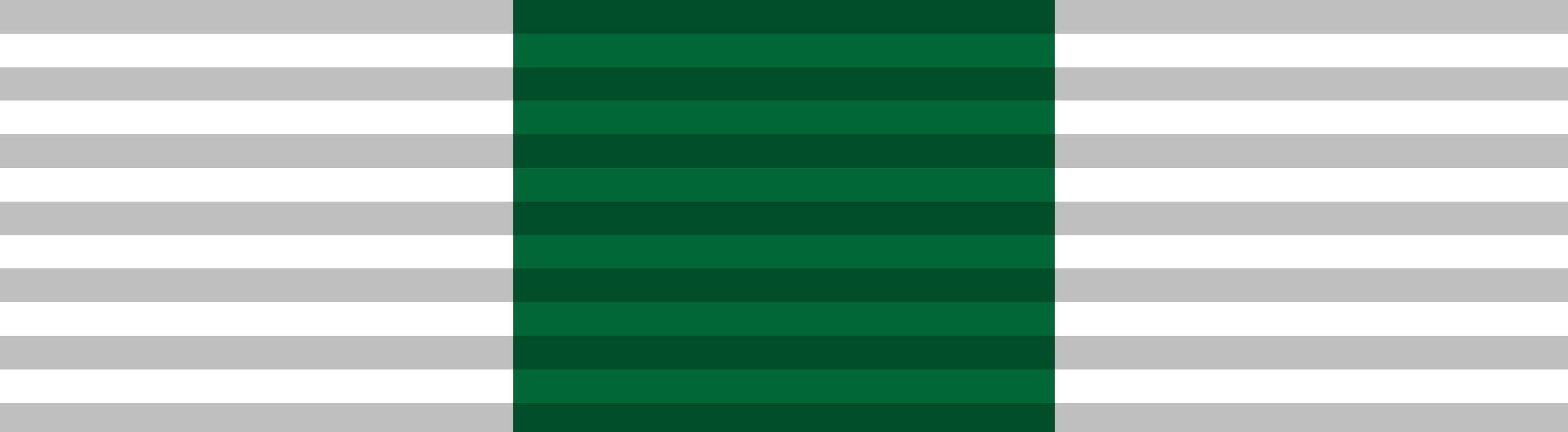
Sitara-e-Jurat - 3

- Lt Col Abu Taher Khairul Haque
- Subedar Azeem Khan
- Subedar Muhammad Ali

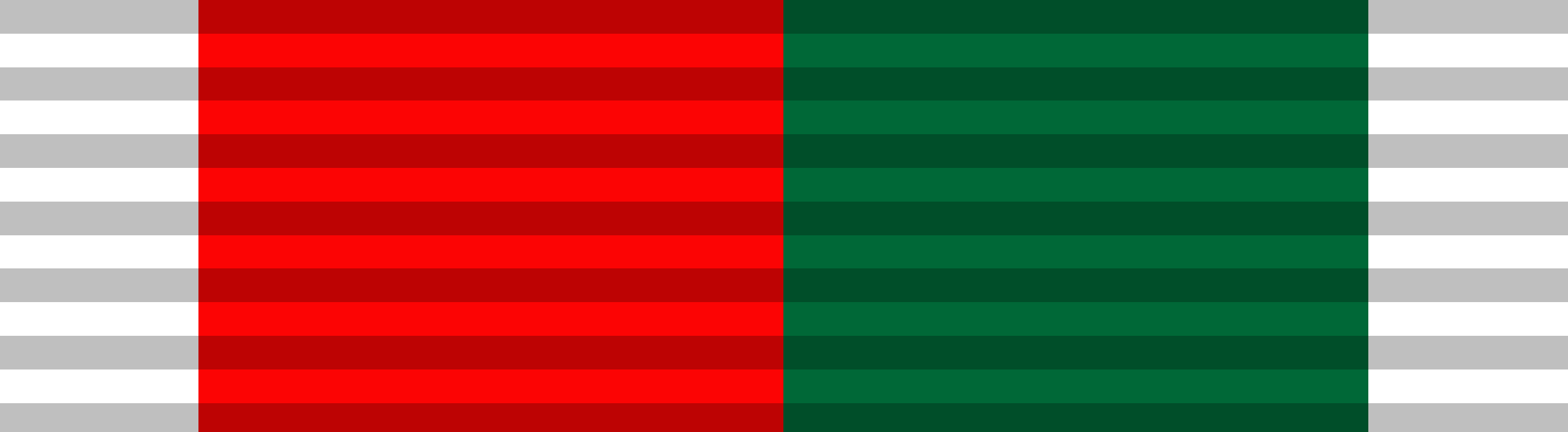
Tamgha-e-Jurat - 7

- Havildar Ataur Rehman
- Havildar Zahirul Haque Pathan
- Naik Monirul Haque †
- Naik Tajul Islam †
- Sepoy Hashmat Ullah
- Sepoy Abdul Hashem
- Sepoy Amin Ullah

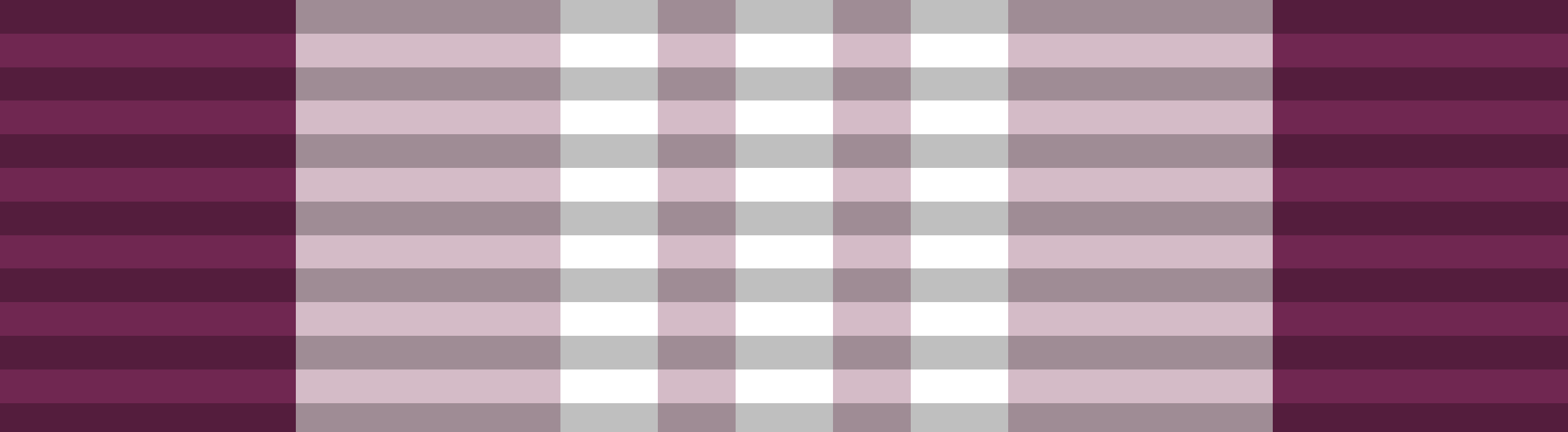
Tamgha-e-Quaid-e-Azam - 1

- Captain Sadiqur Rahman Chowdhury

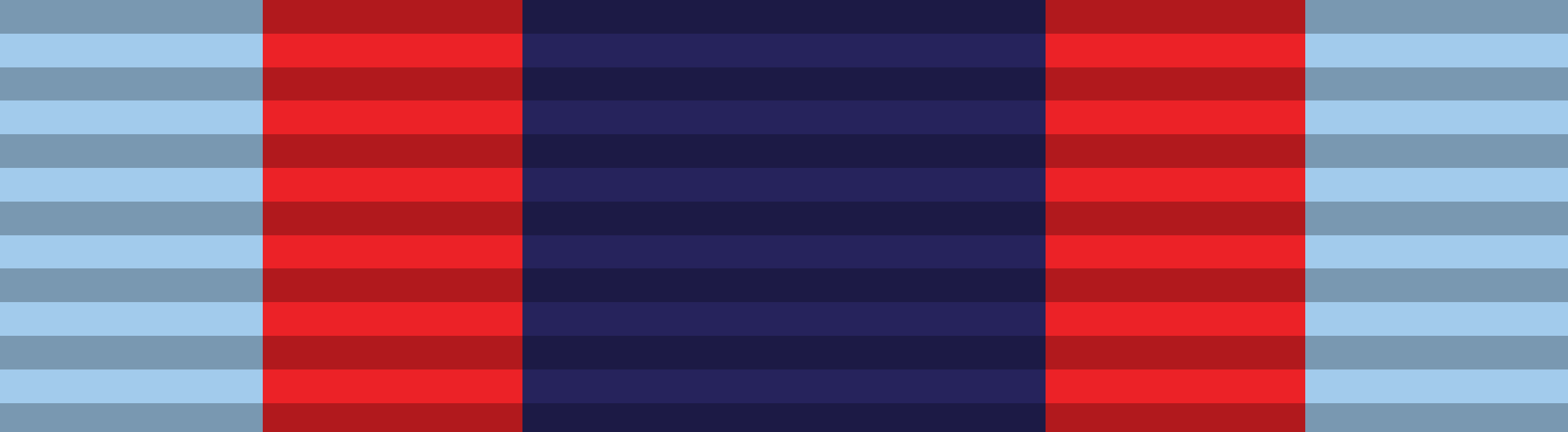
Tamgha-e-Basalat - 1

- Subedar Major Khorshed Mia

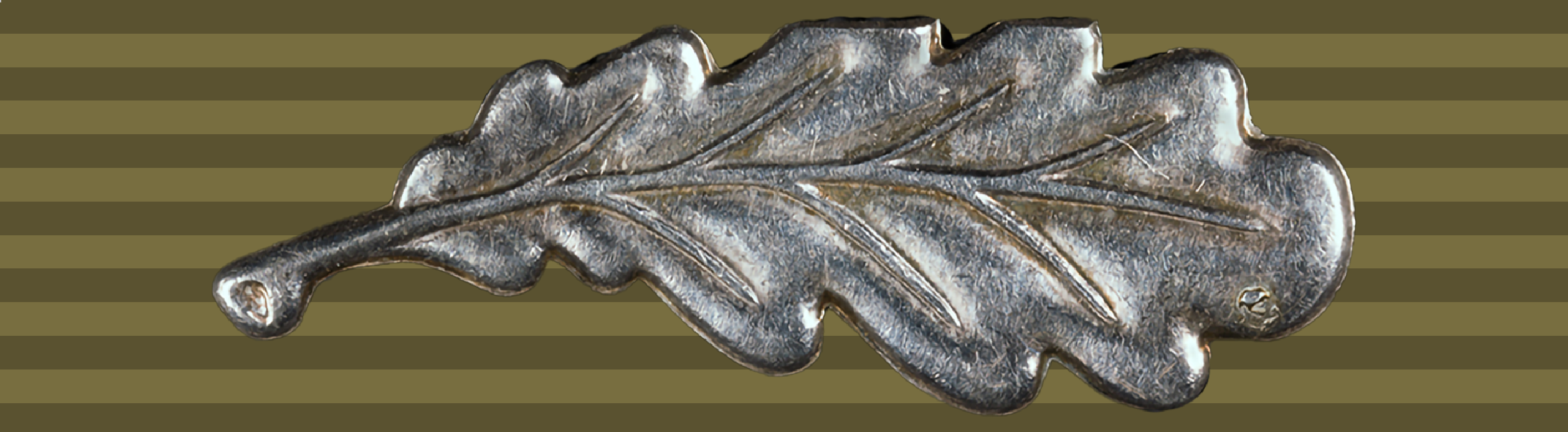
Imtiazi Sanad - 3

- Major Muhammad Iqbal Qureshi
- Major Abdul Hamid Butt
- Havildar Lutfur Rahman Chawdhury

=== 1971 Liberation War ===
The unit was a part of the Z Force and won the following awards for showing immense bravery and courage in the battlefield.

Bir Sreshtho - 1

- Sepoy Hamidur Rahman †

Bir Uttom - 6

- Lt Col Mohammad Ziauddin
- Captain Salahuddin Mumtaz †
- Second lieutenant Mohammad Anwar Hossain †
- Captain Mahbubur Rahman †
- Liaquat Ali Khan

Bir Bikrom - 23

- Lt Col Moinul Hossain Chowdhury
- Captain Hafiz Uddin Ahmed
- Major Khondkar Nazmul Huda
- Sepoy Amir Khan Miraz

Bir Protik - 9

- Major Wakar Hasan

=== Gulf War ===
The unit was deployed in the conflict and personnels were awarded the following awards.
Operation Kuwait Punorgothon
