= Shafaat Jamil =

Bangladeshi freedom fighter and former army officer

- শাফায়াত জামিল
- Born: 1 March 1940; Kishoreganj, Bengal, British India
- Died: 11 August 2012 (aged 72); Dhaka, Bangladesh
- Burial place: Banani graveyard
- Alma mater: Dhaka College; University of Dhaka; Pakistan Military Academy
- Military career
- Allegiance: Bangladesh; Pakistan (before 1971)
- Branch: Bangladesh Army; Pakistan Army
- Service years: 1964-1976
- Rank: Colonel
- Unit: East Bengal Regiment
- Commands: Sub Commander of Sector - XI; Sub Commander of Sector - IV; CO of 3rd East Bengal Regiment; Commander of 72nd Independent Infantry Brigade; Commander of 46th Independent Infantry Brigade
- Conflicts: Indo-Pak war of 1965; Bangladesh Liberation War
- Awards: Bir Bikrom

Shafaat Jamil (Bengali: শাফায়াত জামিল), Bir Bikrom (1 March 1940 – 11 August 2012) was a Bangladesh Army colonel. He was the commanding officer of the 3rd East Bengal Regiment of Z Force Brigade in Sector 11 of Bangladesh Forces during the War of Bangladesh Independence in 1971. He was among the first Bengali officers who rebelled against the Pakistani Army in the 1971 Liberation War of Bangladesh and later fought in 11 sector and in Sylhet sector.

== Early life ==
He was born on 1 March 1940 in Kishoreganj District. His father A. H. M. Karimullah was a judicial officer in the East Pakistan Civil Service. Jamil was educated at Dhaka College, University of Dhaka and Pakistan Military Academy, Kakul. He joined the Pakistan Military Academy in 1962.

In 1964, he was commissioned as a second lieutenant in the Pakistani Army's East Bengal Regiment. He was a course mate of General Pervez Musharraf, the former president of Pakistan. He was from 29th PMA Long Course.

== Role in Bangladesh Liberation War ==
In March 1971 Jamil was promoted to the rank of major in the Pakistani Army. On 27 March 1971, he mutinied against the Pakistani Army with Bengali officers and soldiers of 4th East Bengal Regiment (nicknamed Baby Tigers) after hearing the news of the genocide carried out by the Pakistani Army in East Pakistan/Bangladesh. As a Bangladesh Force (BDF) officer he fought against the Pakistani Forces in Sector-11 until 10 October, when he was ordered to fight in the Sylhet sector in Bangladesh.

In June 1971 he was appointed commanding officer of the 3rd East Bengal Regiment in Sector 11 under sector commander Major Ziaur Rahman, later commander of Z Force Brigade. The 3rd East Bengal Regiment participated in numerous operations of varying scale. He augmented the famous Chilmari Riverborne Amphibious operation led by Mankachar sub sector commander of BDF Sector 11 Squadron Leader M. Hamidullah Khan with two armed platoons from 3rd East Bengal Regiment. Zia also entrusted Jamil the defence of the Teldhala area. Under Zia's directive Major Shafaat Jamil, assisted by Lieutenant Nurun Nabi and Captain Anwar, set up the first functioning administrative area there, which included a police station (The Roumari Police Station), a magistrate court, customs and excise hall, a public school, a jail house and a 10-bed hospital. On 27 August 1971, he was present with Major Zia at the opening of the first post office and two sub-post offices in the vicinity. On 11 October 1971 Major Shafaat Jamil's 3rd East Bengal Regiment participated in the battles of Chattak, Sylhet, Bangladesh. Although the Chattak Operation failed, under Jamil's leadership the 3rd East Bengal Regiment killed 364 Pakistani soldiers. Major Shafaat Jamil led his battalion in the Radhanagar Operation and he was injured in this battle. Jamil's battalion captured the Pakistani position where the Indian Army's Gurkha Regiment had previously failed. Later Jamil received medical treatment for battle injuries at Shilong Military Hospital, Shilong, India.

== Bangladesh Army ==
After the Independence War of Bangladesh, Jamil was promoted to lieutenant colonel, awarded Bir Bikram the third highest gallantry award of Bangladesh, and was posted as brigade commander of 72nd Infantry Brigade at Rangpur Cantonment. In 1974 he was promoted to colonel and appointed brigade commander of 46th Infantry Brigade at Dhaka Cantonment. He was replaced by Colonel Quazi Golam Dastgir as the commander of 72nd Infantry Brigade. On 3 November 1975, he helped Brigadier Khaled Mosharraf to initiate an armed uprising and proceeded towards Bangabhaban against the regime of Khondaker Mostaq Ahmad. However, the uprising was reconditioned on 6 November with the resignation of Mostaq Ahmed from the presidency and his replacement by Justice Abu Sadat Mohammad Sayem. On 7 November, a mutiny incited by Lieutenant Colonel Abu Taher resulted in the end of the uprising; Khaled Mosharraf was assassinated while Colonel Jamil was detained. Due to his pivotal role in the 3 November coup, he was given court martial and was dismissed from the army on 7 March 1976.

== Death ==
Jamil lived a quiet life after his retirement and generally stayed far away from the media. In the early hours of 11 August 2012 he was taken to the Combined Military Hospital, Dhaka after complaining of chest pains, however as his health deteriorated on the way, he was taken to Apollo Hospital Dhaka instead. He was declared dead by doctors at the hospital at 2:10 am.

Shafaat Jamil's namaz-e-janaza (funeral prayer) was held at the Central Mosque of Dhaka Cantonment after Duhr prayers on 11 August. State minister for liberation war affairs ministry Captain Tajul Islam (retired) and several military officers took part in the final prayer. He was buried at Banani's Army graveyard with traditional military honor and state honor.

Chief of the Army Staff General Iqbal Karim Bhuiyan paid his respects to the deceased at Banani's Military graveyard.

== Family ==
He left behind his wife, three sons and four grandchildren. His two eldest sons live in the US while his youngest son is serving in the Bangladesh Army.
