= Harun Ahmed Chowdhury =

High commissioner of Bangladesh Army

Harun Ahmed Chowdhury BU

High Commissioner of Bangladesh to the Maldives
- In office 8 August 1998 – 27 January 2000
- President: Shahabuddin Ahmed
- Prime Minister: Sheikh Hasina
- Preceded by: Position created
- Succeeded by: Abdullah Al Hassan

Personal details
- Born: November 6, 1945 (age 81) Noakhali, Bengal Presidency, British India
- Children: 3
- Awards: Bir Uttom

Military service
- Allegiance: Bangladesh; Pakistan (before 1971)
- Branch/service: Bangladesh Army; Pakistan Army
- Years of service: 1966 – 2000
- Rank: Major General
- Unit: East Bengal Regiment
- Commands: 2IC of 11th East Bengal Regiment; Deputy Commander of Z Force
- Battles/wars: Bangladesh Liberation War

Harun Ahmed Chowdhury is a retired two star officer, diplomat, and veteran of the Bangladesh Army. He was the first high commissioner of Bangladesh to the Maldives and, furthermore, the antecedent ambassador to Cyprus, Serbia, and Zimbabwe.

== Early life and education ==
Chowdhury was born on 6 November 1945 in Noakhali District of the Bengal Presidency, British India (now in Chittagong Division, Bangladesh). His father was Justice Abdus Sobhan Chowdhury. He completed his matriculation examination from Jashore Zilla School in 1960 and finished high school from the Dinajpur Government College in 1962. He obtained his Bachelor of Arts degree from Dhaka College in 1964. That same year he joined the Pakistan Army as an officer cadet from the Inter Services Selection Board and was commissioned from the Pakistan Military Academy with the 5th East Bengal Regiment in 1966. After joining the Bangladesh Army, Chowdhury finished his staff college courses from the Defence Services Command and Staff College in 1980.

== Military career ==
=== Bangladesh Liberation War ===
Chowdhury served in the 5th East Bengal and the 14th Punjab Regiment before being dispatched to the East Pakistan Rifles, where he was promoted to captain and was the adjutant of the 17th East Pakistan Rifles battalion in 1971. He fought in the Bangladesh Liberation War after rebelling against the Pakistan Army in Kaptai, where he was stationed. He commanded a company of East Pakistan Rifles and was attached to the 8th East Bengal Regiment under the orchestration of his brigade commander, Major Ziaur Rahman. He was injured while fighting in the battle of Kalurghat. He was awarded the Bir Uttom, the second-highest military award for individual gallantry.

=== Post War ===
After the independence of Bangladesh, Chowdhury commanded two infantry companies under the 65th Infantry Brigade and was promoted to the rank of major in 1977. He remained with his unit, which was formed into the 24th Infantry Division and was designated initially as second in command of the 11th East Bengal Regiment and later as divisional general staff officer (grade-2) at Chittagong Cantonment. He was promoted to the rank of lieutenant colonel in 1981 and was transferred to army headquarters as director of military intelligence. At the time of the assassination of President Ziaur Rahman in 1981, Chowdhury wrote the announcement for the murder of Major General Abul Manzur, then general officer commanding of the 24th infantry division and a plotter in the assassination of the president, with input from chief of general staff Major General Nuruddin Khan. Chowdhury was promoted to the rank of colonel in 1985 and served as colonel general staff of the 9th Infantry Division for a brief time before being permanently dispatched to the Ministry of Foreign Affairs.

== Diplomatic career ==
Chowdhury was the defence attaché at the High Commission of Bangladesh to the United Kingdom the same year. He was promoted to the rank of brigadier general in 1986 and remained in the United Kingdom till 1987, where he was promoted to major general and became an ambassador under the ministry. He was appointed the ambassador of Bangladesh to Cyprus in 1988 and to Serbia in 1992. Chowdhury later served as high commissioner to Zimbabwe in 1996. In 1998, Chowdhury was appointed the inaugural high commissioner to Maldives, which he served till his leave per retirement on 27 January 2000.

== Personal life ==
Chowdhury is married and has 2 children. In July 2007, as a member of the Freedom Fighters People's Council, Chowdhury asked the caretaker government of Bangladesh to publish a list of veterans of the Bangladesh Liberation War. On 16 December 2023, he was invited to Kolkata by the 25th Indian ministry on the occasion of the Victory Day celebration in India.
