= Mohammad Ziauddin (officer) =

Bir Uttam recipient & Bangladeshi freedom fighter

Mohammad Ziauddin Ahmed
- মোহাম্মদ জিয়াউদ্দিন আহমেদ
- Born: Mohammad Ziauddin Ahmed; 22 November 1939; Chakaria, Bengal, British India
- Died: 5 August 2025 (aged 85); Chittagong, Bangladesh
- Relatives: Fazlul Karim (uncle)
- Military career
- Allegiance: Pakistan (before 1971); Bangladesh
- Branch: Bangladesh Army; Pakistan Army
- Service years: 1962-1974
- Rank: Lieutenant Colonel
- Nickname: Bachchi
- Service number: P. A. - 6489; B. A. - 489
- Unit: East Bengal Regiment
- Commands: Sub-Commander of Sector – I; Sub-Commander of Sector – IV; Deputy Commander of Z Force; CO of 1st East Bengal Regiment; Commander of 46th Independent Infantry Brigade
- Conflicts: Indo-Pakistani War of 1965; Bangladesh Liberation War
- Awards: Bir Uttom

Mohammad Ziauddin Ahmed, BU (Bengali: মোহাম্মদ জিয়াউদ্দিন আহমেদ; 22 November 1939 – 5 August 2025) was a Bangladeshi military officer who was the commanding officer of the 1st East Bengal Regiment during the Bangladesh Liberation War. He was awarded the Bir Uttom, the country's second highest gallantry award (and the highest military award for living military personnel) for his outstanding bravery in the Liberation War. His certificate number was 22.

Ziauddin was the second brigade commander of the 46 Brigade, Dhaka. He was a close associate of Colonel Abu Taher, who was known for his left-wing socialist views.

== Early life ==
Ziauddin was born in the village of Harbang of Chakaria Upazila, Cox's Bazar District (now in Chittagong, Bangladesh) on 22 November 1939. His father was Mohammad Quasem and mother was Majida Khatun.

== Career ==
=== Pakistan Army ===
Ziauddin joined the Pakistan Army in 1960. He was commissioned from the 25th PMA Long Course on 21 April 1962 in the 1st East Bengal Regiment. He fought in the Indo-Pak War of 1965 as the adjutant of the 1st East Bengal Regiment. Later he served as the A.D.C. of the President of Pakistan. In 1968 he served as an instructor in the Pakistan Military Academy.

=== Bangladesh Liberation War ===
When the Bangladesh Liberation War started, Ziauddin deserted the Pakistan Army with Major Abu Taher, Major Muhammed Abul Manzur, and Captain Bazlul Ghani Patwari from Abbottabad Cantonment, crossing the border to Devigarh in India on 25 July 1971 and reaching Delhi on 27 July. Ziauddin and others reached Calcutta on August 7. He was then given the command of the 1st East Bengal Regiment under Z Force. During the Liberation War, Ziauddin was the commanding officer of the 1st East Bengal Regiment under Sector 1. At the sector commanders conference in October in Calcutta, both Ziauddin and Taher opposed focusing on the Bangladesh Army, encouraging instead more support for irregular militias. They called for reducing reliance on India for weapons and moving the Mukti Bahini headquarters from India to Bangladesh.

On the afternoon of September 8, a company of the 1st East Bengal Regiment went to Mahendraganj, India. A small team of only platoon and section commanders carried out hit and run operations in Kamalpur. He accompanied and led them in all operations. Most of the operations were successful and caused casualties to the Pakistani Army.

Ziauddin commanded the unit Hamidur Rahman served in when they attacked a Pakistan Army camp on the Dhalai River. Crawling forward to destroy the LMG post, he threw a grenade at the bunker, causing the LMG to explode. Sepoy Hamidur Rahman was martyred by another LMG. In the end, Ziauddin ordered them to return to Mohanpur camp due to heavy casualties. Hamidur Rahman of the 1st East Bengal Regiment was posthumously awarded the Bir Sreshtho, Bangladesh's highest award for valor, for his actions during the conflict.

Ziauddin was at the forefront of Sylhet's MC College battle on December 13 of the Liberation War. By December 15, Mukti Bahini and joint forces started knocking at Sylhet's front door. In the end, Pakistani forces decided to surrender. Pakistani forces surrendered in Sylhet on December 17 at 3 pm.

=== Bangladesh Army ===
After independence, Ziauddin was promoted to the rank of lieutenant colonel. Meanwhile, when Indian Prime Minister Indira Gandhi visited Bangladesh, Ziauddin gave her a guard of honour. In 1972, Ziauddin commanded the 46 Brigade, based in Dhaka Cantonment, with which he suppressed a mutiny by soldiers of the Bangladesh Air Force. He spoke in favor of socialism to officers under his command. He and Taher, in charge of the 46th Infantry Brigade, commanded nearly 90 percent of the infantry soldiers of the newly created Bangladesh Army. In 1972, he destroyed all war loot taken by officers and soldiers under his command during the Bangladesh Liberation War. Ziauddin argued that military units should be self-sufficient and raise their own food.

After the independence, for two more months of institutional training, a temporary 'Battle School' on the model of Military Academy was established at Kachukshet in Dhaka Cantonment under the 46th Independent Infantry Brigade for the cadets of the Second Bangladesh War Course. Lt. Col. Ziauddin was in charge of this battle school. He himself was engaged in overall supervision of extended training at the Temporary Battle School.

Ziauddin wrote an article in the Holiday criticizing the government and its treaty with India on 20 August 1972. He called the treaty a secret agreement and pointed out they had fought the war without Sheikh Mujib, who was in jail in Pakistan, and would fight another if necessary. He had published the article when Prime Minister Sheikh Mujibur Rahman was outside the country. The Prime Minister met Ziauddin after returning to the country and demanded an official apology which he refused. He lost his job for the article. He travelled the country getting to know the people.

In February 1974, Zia dropped all contact and went underground to join Marxist revolutionaries. He joined the underground Purba Banglar Sarbahara Party led by Siraj Sikder, which was the most active left wing insurgency in Bangladesh at that time.

His colleague, Major Mohammad Abdul Jalil, who shared his left wing views, was also fired from the army. Siraj Sikder was killed by Bangladesh police on 2 January 1975 on his way to Rakkhi Bahini camp. President Sheikh Mujibur Rahman was killed in 15 August 1975 Bangladeshi coup d'état. One of the mutineers, Major Khandaker Abdur Rashid, asked Taher and Ziauddin to join the new regime. Taher asked him remove the death warrant issued against Zaiuddin by the former president. The new president, Khondakar Mustaque Ahmed, encouraged them to start a political party.

In 1976, Ziauddin was sentenced to ten years imprisonment, while Taher was sentenced to death following the 7 November 1975 Bangladeshi coup d'état. The coup paved the way for Major General Ziaur Rahman to take power.

In 1989, he returned to a normal life under special amnesty. Ziauddin was appointed chairman of Chittagong Development Authority on 2 September 1993 and served until September 15, 1996.

He was the founding principal of Chittagong Presidency International School. After the COVID-19 pandemic, Lt. Col. Ziauddin was leading a retired life in his home in Chittagong until his death on 5 August 2025.
