= Amin Ahmed Chowdhury =

Army officer from Bangladesh

- আমীন আহম্মদ চৌধুরী
- Amin Ahmed Chowdhury in the cover of 1971 and my Career life
- Born: 14 February 1946; Feni, Bengal, British India
- Died: 20 April 2013 (aged 67); Dhaka, Bangladesh
- Burial place: Banani Army Graveyard
- Military career
- Allegiance: Bangladesh (1971–2002); Pakistan (1964–1971)
- Branch: Bangladesh Army; Pakistan Army
- Service years: 1966–2000
- Rank: Major General
- Unit: East Bengal Regiment
- Commands: Sub-Commander of Z Force; Chairman of Bangladesh Tea Board; GOC of 19th Infantry Division
- Conflicts: Bangladesh Liberation War
- Awards: Bir Bikrom; Samar Padak; Al Numan First Class (Oman)
- Other work: Security Analyst; Ambassador of Bangladesh to Oman

Amin Ahmed Chowdhury was a Bangladeshi army officer and diplomat.

== Early life ==
Chowdhury was born in South Anandpur village of Fulghazi in Feni on 14 February 1946 to Sultan Ahmed Chowdhury, a police officer. He passed S.S.C. in 1961. In 1963 he passed H.S.C. from Dhaka College. He got admitted to Ananda Mohan College, Mymensingh. While studying in Ananda Mohan College in 1965 he enlisted himself to Pakistan Military Academy.

== Military career ==
=== Pakistan Army ===
Chowdhury joined Army Officer's Course on 27 November 1965. He was commissioned on 5 June 1966 in 4th East Bengal Regiment. Later he was posted to the East Bengal Regimental Centre in Chittagong. He served there as adjutant.

=== Liberation War of Bangladesh ===
In 1971 he was a captain and was posted to EBRC as adjutant. On 24 March 1971 he was taken to Dhaka along with Brigadier Mahmudur Rahman Majumdar commandant of EBRC. On 29 March he escaped from Dhaka and went to Agartala. Later in July 1971 he joined Z force under Ziaur Rahman. He was posted to the 8th East Bengal Regiment of Z Force. He was injured during an operation in August 1971 and was taken to Lucknow Hospital for better treatment he was there till 17 December 1971. Later he went to Germany for his better treatment.

=== Bangladesh Army ===
On 10 April 1972 he came back from Germany. He was given the command of 16 East Bengal Regiment. On 17 September 1973 he was promoted to the rank of Lieutenant Colonel. On 9 October 1973 he was transferred to 19 East Bengal Regiment as its commanding officer. In November 1974 he was posted to Military Operations Directorate as G-1.On 12 November 1975 he was sent to Rangpur Cantonment. In 1976 he was sent to Bogra Cantonment to stop the ongoing mutiny there. In 1977 he was sent to Burma as the Defence Attache of Bangladesh Embassy but he was sent back by the government of Burma because of the Rohingya issue. He was appointed as the Chief Instructor of the School of Infantry and Tactics. On 4 April 1978 he was promoted to the rank of Colonel and was posted as the Brigade Commander of 72 Infantry Brigade in Rangpur. From 1979 to 1982 he was posted to the Sylhet Cantonment. He was sent to Defence Ministry as joint secretary in 1982.On 15 March 1986 he was appointed as the managing director of Muktijodha Kollan Trust. On 5 September 1989 he was appointed as the chairman of Bangladesh Tea Board. On 9 June 1992 he was appointed as the provost marshal of Bangladesh Army. On 19 July 1995 he was appointed as the ambassador of Bangladesh to Oman he served there till 2002. He retired from the army on 31 December 2000.

== After military retirement ==
Chowdhury held various coveted posts in the government. He was appointed chairman of Retired Armed Forces Officers Welfare Organization (RAOWA). Amin also played as pivotal and pioneering role in raising local fund from Bangladeshi expatriates from all walks of life, arranging grants and loans from the government of Bangladesh and obtaining approvals from governments of Oman. During his tenure as ambassador of Bangladesh to Oman he established Bangladesh School Muscat for the Bangladeshi community children's who are residing in Oman. He also contributed in strengthening the brotherly ties between Oman and Bangladesh along with his contribution for the welfare of expatriate Bangladeshis was well acclaimed by the government of Oman. The government of Oman conferred him with the title 'Al Numan', a prestigious civil order by the Government of Oman. Amin was also acclaimed as security analyst and columnist of leading local and international skills in talk shows of different TV channels on contemporary issues.

== Death ==
Chowdhury reported chest pain when was writing a column. He was rushed to the hospital and where the doctors pronounced him dead. Prime Minister and President paid homage to him and was buried with full military guard of honour in Banani Graveyard on 20 April 2013.

== Personal life ==
Chowdhury had an older brother, Amir Ahmed Chowdhury, who became a prominent academic and cultural figure in Mymensingh, Bangladesh During the War of Liberation, Amir was captured by the Pakistani Army, confined and tortured, but escaped. The Pakistani army raided their home in Feni, and killed their octogenarian grandfather and six other family members. He was married to Latifa Amin on 9 May 1975.They have 2 sons.
