= Hafiz Uddin Ahmad =

Speaker of the Bangladesh Parliament since 2026

Hafiz Uddin Ahmad BB FIFA OOM
- হাফিজ উদ্দিন আহমদ
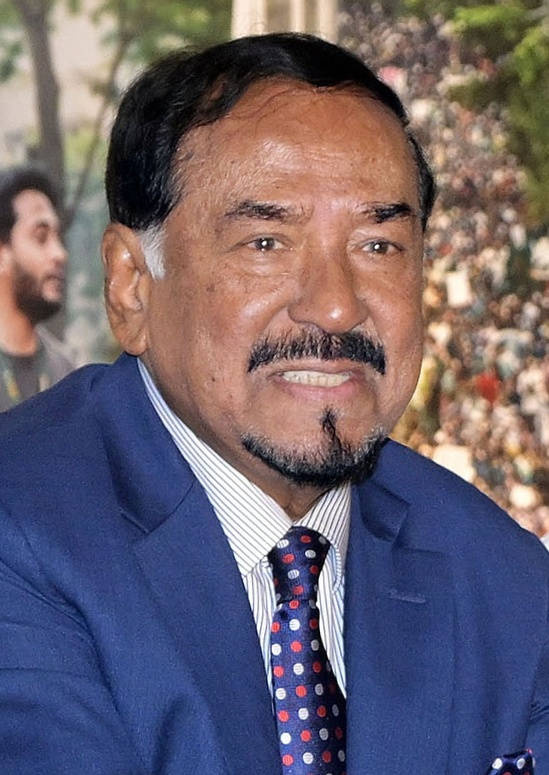
- Hafiz in 2026

14th Speaker of the Jatiya Sangsad
- Incumbent
- Assumed office 12 March 2026 (Note: Kayser Kamal was acting speaker from July 24 2026 to August 21 2026 during Hafiz's acting presidency)
- Deputy: Kayser Kamal
- Preceded by: Shirin Sharmin Chaudhury
Ministerial positions
Minister for Liberation War Affairs
In office 17 February 2026 – 12 March 2026
Prime Minister	Tarique Rahman
Preceded by	Faruk-e-Azam
Succeeded by	Ahmed Azam Khan
Minister for Commerce
In office 24 April 2006 – 29 October 2006
Prime Minister	Khaleda Zia
Preceded by	Altaf Hossain Chowdhury
Succeeded by	Faruk Khan
Minister for Water Resources
In office 22 May 2003 – 29 October 2006
Prime Minister	Khaleda Zia
Preceded by	L. K. Siddiqi
Succeeded by	Ramesh Chandra Sen
Minister for Jute
In office 10 October 2001 – 22 May 2003
Prime Minister	Khaleda Zia
Preceded by	A. K. Faezul Huq
Succeeded by	Lutfor Rahman Khan Azad
State Minister for Commerce
In office 19 March 1996 – 30 March 1996
Prime Minister	Khaleda Zia
Preceded by	Abdus Sattar
Succeeded by	Barkat Ullah Bulu

Member of Parliament
- Incumbent
- Assumed office 17 February 2026
- Preceded by: Nurunnabi Chowdhury
- Constituency: Bhola-3
- In office 10 July 1986 – 27 October 2006
- Preceded by: Constituency established
- Succeeded by: Mohammad Jashimuddin

President of Bangladesh
- Acting
- In office 24 July 2026 – 21 August 2026
- Prime Minister: Tarique Rahman
- Preceded by: Mohammed Shahabuddin
- Succeeded by: Mirza Fakhrul Islam Alamgir

President of Bangladesh Football Federation
- In office 23 June 1986 – 5 January 1989
- Preceded by: Harun Ahmed Chowdhury
- Succeeded by: Mahmudul Hasan

Personal details
- Born: 29 October 1944 (age 82) Bhola, Bengal, British India
- Party: Bangladesh Nationalist Party
- Other political affiliations: Jatiya Party (E)
- Spouse: Dilara Hafiz (d. 2026)
- Parent: Azahar Uddin Ahmed
- Education: University of Dhaka; Pakistan Military Academy
- Awards: Bir Bikrom; FIFA Order of Merit

Military service
- Allegiance: Pakistan (before 1971); Bangladesh
- Branch/service: Pakistan Army; Bangladesh Army
- Years of service: 1968–1975
- Rank: Major
- Unit: 1st East Bengal Regiment
- Commands: Sub-commander of Sector – VIII; Sub-commander of Sector – XI; Company Commander of Z Force; CO of 1st East Bengal Regiment
- Battles/wars: Bangladesh Liberation War
Association football career
- Position: Left winger
Senior career*
Years	Team	Apps	(Gls)
1962–1963	Fire Service		
1963–1964	Wari Club		
1964–1966	Fire Service		
1966–1967	Dhaka Wanderers		
1967–1978	Dhaka Mohammedan		
International career
1967–1970	Pakistan		
- * Club domestic league appearances and goals

Hafiz Uddin Ahmad (born 29 October 1944), (Note: BB FIFA OoM) also known as Major Hafiz, is a Bangladeshi politician, former military officer, and retired footballer serving as the Speaker of Bangladesh Parliament since February 2026. He was the acting president of Bangladesh from 24 July to 21 August 2026.

A decorated veteran of the Bangladesh Liberation War, Ahmad served in the 1st East Bengal Regiment under Z Force and was awarded the Bir Bikrom, Bangladesh's third-highest gallantry award, for his role in the Battle of Kamalpur. Following his military service as a major in the Bangladesh Army, he entered politics and was elected as a member of parliament for the Bhola-3 constituency for six terms. Over his political career, he held several cabinet positions, including minister of commerce in the third Khaleda cabinet and minister of Liberation War affairs in the Tarique cabinet.

Prior to his military and political careers, Ahmad was a prominent national athlete. He played as a forward for Mohammedan SC, winning four Dhaka League titles and the Aga Khan Gold Cup. He represented the Pakistan national football team in international competitions between 1967 and 1970 and served as national sprint champion in the mid-1960s. In 2004, he received the FIFA Order of Merit in recognition of his contributions to football.

== Early life and education ==
Ahmad was born on 29 October 1944 in Lalmohan on Bhola Island, which was then a part of the Backergunge District of Bengal. He belongs to a Bengali family of Muslim Patwaries originally from the village of Char Kakra in North Niamatpur, Daulatkhan, Bhola Island. His father, Azahar Uddin Ahmed, was a member of the National Council of East Pakistan representing Bhola. In 1968, Ahmad received his Master of Arts degree in political science from the University of Dacca.

== Athletic career ==
=== Club ===
Ahmad was a football player during his university days. He later played for Fire Service, Wari Club and Dhaka Wanderers.

Hafiz later joined the Mohammedan SC in 1967. He remained with the Black and Whites until his retirement in 1978. He won 4 Dhaka First Division League titles with MSC: 1969, 1975, 1976, and 1978. He also won the Aga Khan Gold Cup title with the Black and Whites. In 1976, he led the Mohammedan SC team successfully. He replaced defender Zakaria Pintoo in the job. Mohammedan SC won the Dacca league title, defeating arch rivals Abahani in the final 2–0. Hafiz scored both the goals. Mohammedan SC reached the finals of the Aga Khan Gold Cup Football later in the year, beating the Sri Lanka national football team 2–1 in the SF. But they lost to the Penang Football Association Team (Malaysia) 3–0 in the final. In 1973, Hafiz became the first after independence to score a double hat-trick in the First Division as Mohammedan defeated Fire Service 6–0.

=== International ===
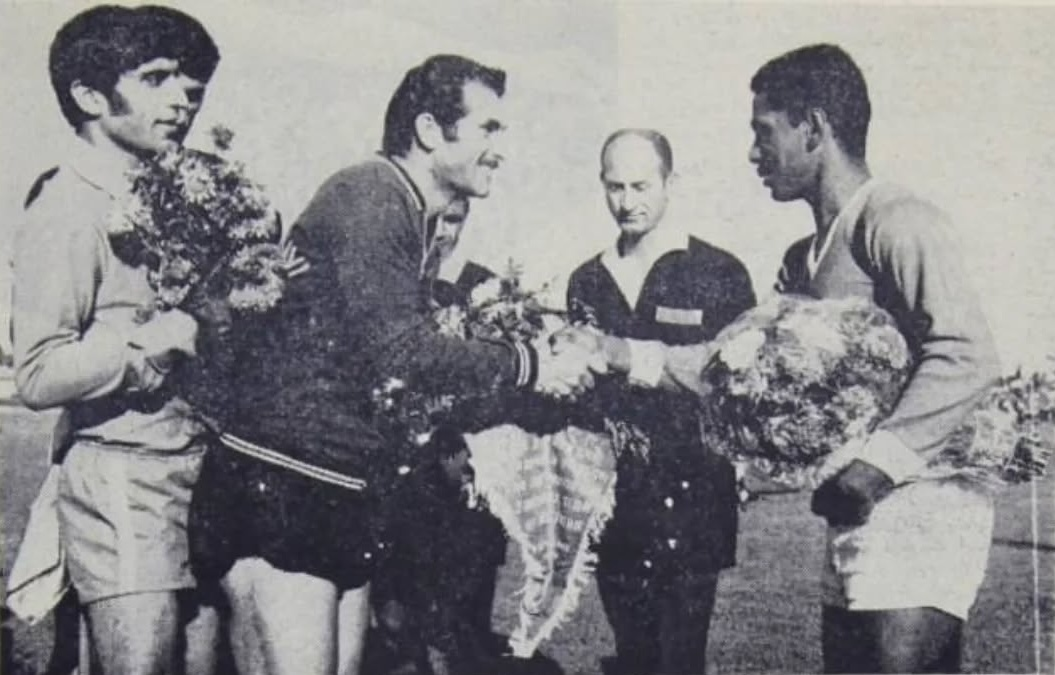
Hafizuddin (right) captaining the Pakistan national team during a match against Bandar-e Pahlavi in 1970

He was selected for the Pakistan national team in 1967 during a test series against Saudi Arabia, and the same year he played in the 1968 AFC Asian Cup qualification in Burma, and the 1967 RCD Cup in Dacca. He also played against the touring American club Dallas Tornado in 1967.

In March 1968, he played in test matches against Soviet club FC Kairat in home venue, and the next year he featured against CSKA Moscow during their tour to Pakistan in February 1969. The same year he participated in the 1969 Friendship Cup in Iran and the 1969 RCD Cup in Turkey.

He last featured at the 1970 RCD Cup as vice-captain behind Qadir Bakhsh, and captained the national team in an exhibition match against Bandar-e Pahlavi after the finalisation of the tournament, which ended in a 4–2 victory.

=== Sprinting ===
He was the fastest man in East Pakistan in the three seasons of 1964, 1965 and 1966. He won gold medals in the 100 and 200 meters in record timings.

== Military career ==
=== Pakistan Army ===
While playing for the Pakistan and Mohammedan football teams in 1967, Ahmad was inspired to join the Pakistan Army by the general secretary of the Pakistan Football Federation, Major Malik Muhammad Husain. Ahmed applied to join the army's Education Corps but later shifted to infantry and was commissioned in 1968 in the 1st East Bengal Regiment (the Senior Tigers). He was trained at the Pakistan Military Academy in Kakul, Abbottabad. After being commissioned, he continued his career as a football player and participated in many tournaments. After the 1970 Bhola cyclone, he, as a captain with Bravo Company, engaged in relief work at Galachipa, Patuakhali.

=== Role in Bangladesh War of Independence ===
Ahmad was at Jagdishpur Village in the border area of Jessore as part of a training exercise. He was barred from all types of communication there and had no idea of Operation Searchlight by the Pakistan Army and the declaration of independence of Bangladesh. He returned to Jessore Cantonment on 29 March. He learned from his batman that there was an order for the Baloch Regiment to disarm the East Bengal Regiment, and that 25 Baloch Regiment and 22 Frontier Force had taken up positions in front of the cantonment. The arsenal had been broken into by East Bengal non-commissioned officers and soldiers. He joined the Bangladesh War of Independence and asked his commanding officer, Colonel Jalil, to join the war. But Jalil, who maintained contact with M. A. G. Osmani of the Bangladesh Awami League, refused to join the war, as Osmani had asked.

During the subsequent battle, Ahmad fought alongside his troops, but realised that the ammunition they had with them would not be enough to last for more than three hours. So, he started thinking about an exit plan. After fighting relentlessly for almost two hours, he finally escaped the cantonment with 200 companions.

In later campaigning, Ahmad, under continuous attack from the Pakistani army, he maintained a free zone at Jessore, including Benapole BOP, from April to mid-May. During the second week of May 1971, Ahmed was ordered to move to Tura, Meghalaya, to join the BDF Sector 11 under Major Ziaur Rahman. He was selected to lead the Bravo formation as company commander of the 1st East Bengal Regiment in Jessore. He was injured during the Battle of Kamalpur, one of the most significant battles fought by Bangladesh forces in 1971.

== Political career ==
Ahmad entered politics as an independent candidate from Bhola. He has been elected as a member of parliament from the Bhola-3 constituency 6 times from 1986 until 2006. He was the president of the Bangladesh Football Federation from 1986 until 1989. He was later elected vice-president of the Asian Football Confederation for the term from 1990 to 1994.

He served as the minister of water resources during the tenure of the second government of Prime Minister Khaleda Zia. Ahmed held several talks with India about the sharing of water. After the reshuffling of the cabinet, he was also appointed as the commerce minister.

A three-member judicial committee investigating the 2001 Bangladesh post-election violence alleged Ahmad had directed attacks against religious minorities along with other Bangladesh Nationalist Party politicians.

Ahmad was detained while protesting the government's decision to repeal the caretaker government system on 11 June 2011. Again on 28 December 2013, Ahmed was arrested on the National Press Club premises when he was leaving there after announcing a new program of demonstrations to be led by his party. On 16 August 2024, he was made a national standing committee member of the Bangladesh Nationalist Party (BNP). He left the position after being elected as the Speaker of the Jatiya Sangsad.

== Acting President of Bangladesh ==
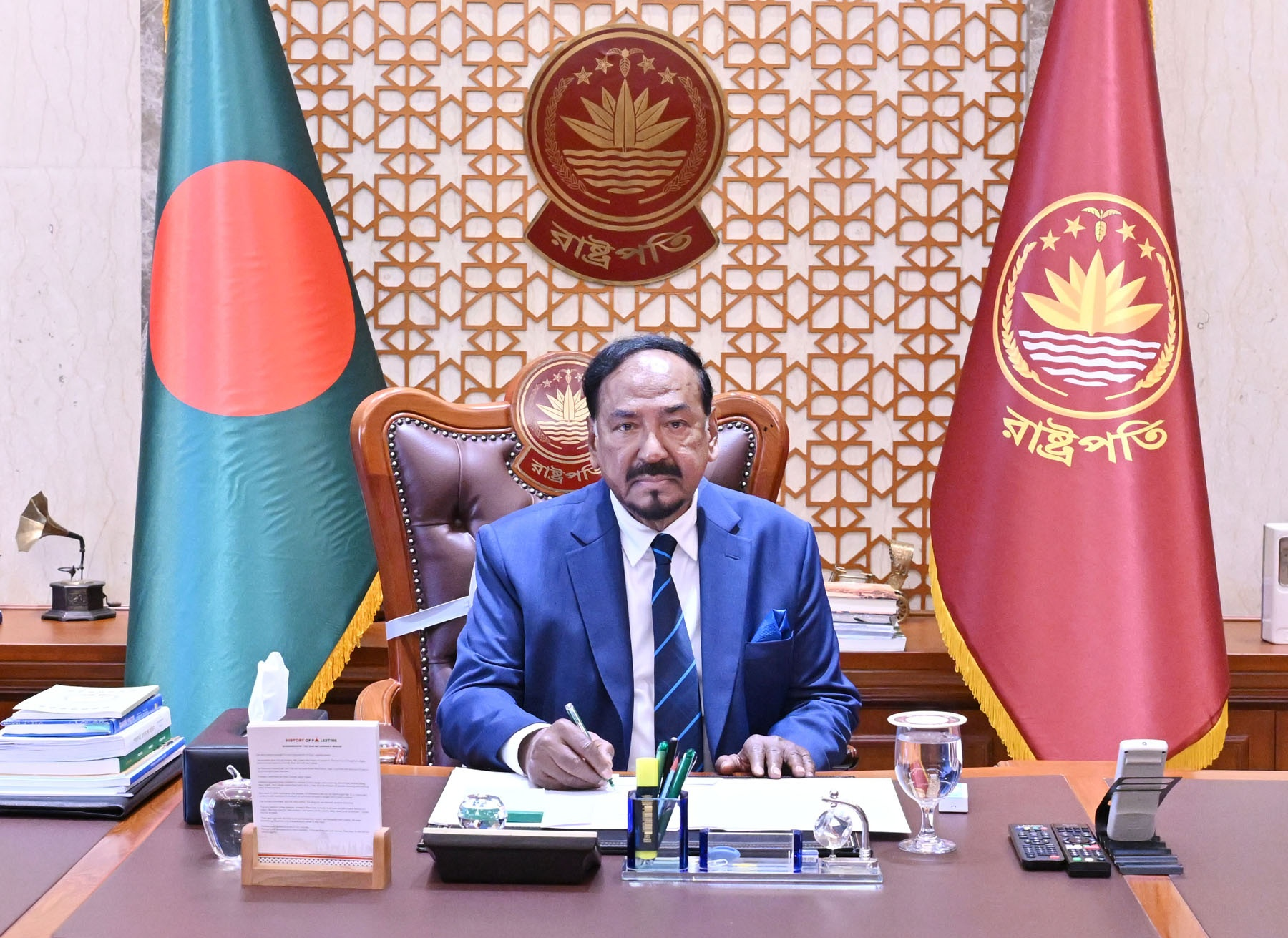
Acting President Hafiz Uddin Ahmed began his duties at Bangabhaban.

On 24 July 2026, President Mohammed Shahabuddin resigned, citing ill health. As per the constitution of Bangladesh, the speaker of the Jatiya Sangsad will perform the duties of the president until a new one is elected. As a result, Ahmad became acting president. Citing the resignation, Ahmad remarked, "Although he (Shahabuddin) was elected during the tenure of the Hasina government, he has always expressed support and respect for the new government elected by the votes of the people. I wish him well."

== Personal life ==
Hafiz was married to educator Dilara Hafiz. They have two sons, Shahrukh Hafiz and Taharat Hafiz, and a daughter, Shamama Shahreen. Dilara Hafiz died on 28 March 2026.

Political offices
Preceded by Mohammed Shahabuddin	Acting President of Bangladesh; 2026	Succeeded by Mirza Fakhrul Islam Alamgir
Order of precedence
Preceded by Tarique Rahman as Prime Minister	Order of precedence of Bangladesh as Speaker of the Parliament	Followed by Zubayer Rahman Chowdhury as Chief Justice
