= Battle of Kamalpur =

Battle fought during Bangladesh War of Independence

Coordinates: 25.2126°N 89.8692°E

- Part of Bangladesh Liberation War
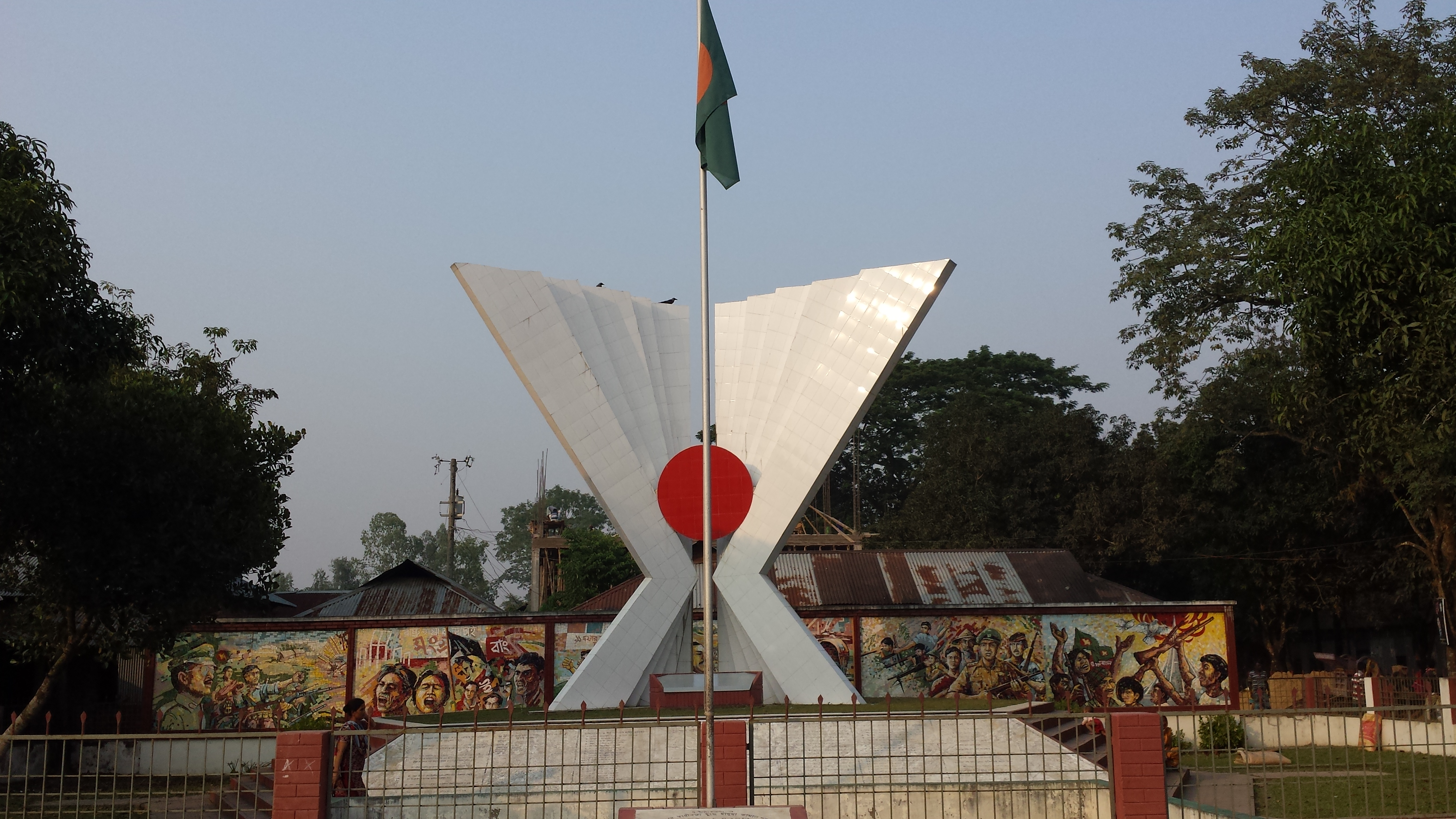
- Kamalpur Memorial in Bangladesh
Date	12 June – 4 December 1971
Location	Kamalpur, Jamalpur, East Pakistan
Result	Bangladeshi victory
Territorial changes	Capture of Jamalpur by Mukti Bahini

Belligerents
Bangladesh: Mukti Bahini; Supported by: India (from November)	Pakistan: Pakistan Army

Commanders and leaders
Ziaur Rahman; Abu Taher (WIA); Moinul Hossain. Hafiz Uddin Ahmad (WIA); Syed Sadruzzaman Helal; Salauddin Mumtaz † (India) Gurbaksh Singh Gill (India) Hardev Singh Kler	A. A. K. Niazi; Ahsan Malik

Units involved
Z Force; 1st East Bengal Regiment	31st Baluch Regiment; 24th Cavalry (Frontier Force)

Strength
3,000 (India) 4,000	7,000

Casualties and losses
194 killed (India) Unknown	497 killed 162—220 captured

The Battle of Kamalpur (Bengali: কামালপুরের যুদ্ধ), is one of the most significant military engagements fought by the Mukti Bahini in 1971 during its war of independence from Pakistan. The Pakistan Army set up a military camp at Kamalpur (now in Baksiganj Upazila of Jamalpur District) which was attacked by 1st East Bengal Regiment of Z Force several times. The first attack was made on June 12, and a second attack was made on July 31, 1971, also another attack at 22 October 1971 and in total, there were 18 battles in Kamalpur.

== Camp at Kamalpur ==
Kamalpur, a border area, was known as the gateway to Dhaka from the northern sector under Sector 11, the central sector and the largest one of the Mukti Bahini. It was situated on the mouth of the old Brahmaputra and on the road link with Mymensingh via Jamalpur. Pakistan Army set up a military camp at Kamalpur. This camp was tactically crucial for the Pakistan Army because its fall would cause the Pakistan Army to lose control over strongholds in Jamalpur—Mymensingh—Dacca region.

The Pakistani troops made concrete bunkers which contained shell-proof roofs. To provide communication between bunkers, they dug communication trenches. The camp perimeter included Booby traps and mine fields as defence.

About two companies of 31 regiment excluding Razakar paramilitaries constituted the enemy force.

== Attacks on Kamalpur Camp ==
On June 12, 1971, the first attack was launched by Z-Force at Kamalpur Camp. Pakistani troops tried to enter the villages of Sarishabari Upazila of Jamalpur district but failed, as the villagers confronted them but local civilians were also killed. While retreating, the Pakistan Army set fire in the villages.

The second attack was led by Ziaur Rahman on July 31, 1971. Zia was supported by Major Moinul Hossain, Captain Hafiz and Captain Salauddin Mumtaz. The attack was made with two companies Delta and Bravo from the North – East of the enemy camp. Captain Salauddin Mumtaz commanded Delta on the left and Captain Hafiz commanded Bravo on the right. As the troops were moving towards the enemy post, the enemy artillery started firing heavily. As a result, the progress of the two companies became slow. The communication system collapsed because of heavy rain. However, the troops continued moving forward and entered the outer perimeter of the enemy camp. Though casualties were increasing, the fighters made progress through the minefield. At one stage of the fight, two artillery shells dropped in front of Captain Salauddin Mumtaz and killed him. And three Mukti Bahini fighters were killed trying to save him, and Captain Hafiz was injured. In the morning at 7:30, Major Moinul Hossain, the battalion commander of 1st East Bengal Regiment ordered the battalion to retreat.

India joined the war at late November, brigades were deployed to capture Kamalpur, however Indian forces made more than 3 unsuccessful attempts to take Kamalpur which led to deterioration of moral, and casualties heavily increased and finally on December 4, the Pakistan Army was overrun and withdrawn and fell back to their headquarters at Jamalpur after an attack by Bangladesh Forces and the Indian Army.

The Battle of Kamalpur was one of the deadliest major military engagements in the 1971 war of independence, 194 fighters of the Mukti Bahini were killed in the battle. Meanwhile, the Pakistan Army lost 497 soldiers in the battle and 200 soldiers were captured. In the aftermath of the battle, Pakistani forces were defeated.

== See also ==
- Timeline of the Bangladesh Liberation War
- Military plans of the Bangladesh Liberation War
- Pakistan Army order of battle, December 1971
- Evolution of Pakistan Eastern Command plan
- Defence of Kamalpur
- List of sectors in the Bangladesh Liberation War
