= A. J. M. Aminul Haque =

Bangladeshi army general

- আবু জাফর মোহাম্মদ আমিনুল হক
- Born: 23 March 1944; Tungipara, Bengal Presidency, British India
- Died: 16 January 2011 (aged 66); Dhaka, Bangladesh
- Spouse: Maryam Haque
- Children: 2
- Military career
- Allegiance: Pakistan; Bangladesh
- Branch: Pakistan Army; Bangladesh Army
- Service years: 1965–1981
- Rank: Brigadier General
- Service number: BA – 182
- Unit: East Bengal Regiment
- Commands: Director General of National Security Intelligence; Commander of 81st Infantry Brigade; Station Commander, Savar; CO of 8th East Bengal Regiment
- Conflicts: Bangladesh Liberation War
- Awards: Bir Uttom

Abu Jafar Mohammad Aminul Haque (23 March 1944 – 16 January 2011) was a Bangladesh Army officer and veteran of the Bangladesh Liberation War. He was awarded the Bir Uttom, Bangladesh's second-highest military gallantry award. He was the commanding officer of the 8th East Bengal Regiment during the war and retired as a brigadier general from the Bangladesh Army.

== Early life ==
Haque was born on 23 March 1944 in Banshbaria village, Tungipara Upazila, Gopalganj District. His father was Nurul Haque, and his mother was Fatema Zohra.

== Career ==
Haque was commissioned in the Pakistan Army in 1965. He was stationed in Dhaka Cantonment in the field intelligence unit of the Pakistan Army. After the start of the Bangladesh Liberation War, he fled Dhaka Cantonment and joined the 8th East Bengal Regiment, under Z Force of Major Ziaur Rahman, of the Mukti Bahini. He established his base in Munshirhat. He led a mission to rescue his deputy, Captain Amin Ahmed Chowdhury, and other wounded personnel after a Mukti Bahini raid on Nakshi Border Outpost (BOP). Captain Shamsul Alam died in a mine explosion in the attack. He was awarded the Bir Uttom for his contribution to the war.

Haque retired from the Bangladesh Army as a brigadier general in 1981.

In 1994, as convener of the Muktijoddha Kendriya Command Council, Haque created an 84 thousand person list of veterans of the Bangladesh Liberation War. Before him, another list was created by Amin Ahmed, managing director of Muktijoddha Kalyan Trust, who created a list collecting data from the Indian government, which is referred to as the Indian list.

In December 2010, Haque visited India in a 20-member delegation led by Muhammad Enamul Huq, State Minister of Power, along with Major General Mohammad Azizur Rahman, Major General A. T. M. Abdul Wahab, Major General Jibon Kanai Das, and Abed Khan to make Victory Day of Bangladesh.

== Personal life ==
Haque was married to Maryam Haque, and they had one son and one daughter. They lived in Mohakhali DOHS.

== Death ==
Haque died on 16 January 2011.
