= Mahbubur Rahman (captain) =

Bangladeshi military officer

- মাহবুবুর রহমান
- Born: Eidgahbosti, Dinajpur, East Pakistan
- Died: 26 November 1971; Gauripur, near Kanaighat, Sylhet, Bangladesh
- Military career
- Allegiance: Bangladesh
- Branch: Bangladesh Army
- Service years: Before 1971 – 1971
- Rank: Captain (posthumous)
- Unit: 1st East Bengal Regiment
- Conflicts: Bangladesh Liberation War
- Awards: Bir Uttom

Mahbubur Rahman was a Bangladeshi military officer and freedom fighter who was posthumously awarded the title of Bir Uttom, the second-highest gallantry award of Bangladesh, for his actions in the Bangladesh Liberation War.

== Early life ==
Rahman was born in Eidgahbosti, Dinajpur District. His father was A.M. Tasiruddin Ahmed Chowdhury and his mother was Jarina Khatun.

== Career ==
In 1971, Rahman was a Lieutenant in the Pakistan Army's Frontier Force Regiment, posted at Comilla Cantonment.

When the Bangladesh Liberation War began, Rahman left the cantonment on 29 March and joined the War. He joined the Mukti Bahini and was promoted to the rank of Captain. He was appointed commander of the Alpha Company of the regular force, 1st East Bengal Regiment under Z Force of Major Ziaur Rahman. He actively participated in several battles, including in Kamalpur, Jamalpur district.

== Death and legacy ==
In November 1971, Rahman was leading his company near Kanaighat in Sylhet. On the morning of 26 November, Pakistani forces launched a surprise attack. Though the Alpha Company was in a vulnerable position, he led a counterattack. He was shot dead in the battle which his unit won. In recognition of his bravery, Rahman was posthumously awarded the title Bir Uttom, the second-highest gallantry award of Bangladesh.
