= Quazi Golam Dastgir =

Bangladeshi military officer

- Dastgir in Chittagong (1991)

Ambassador of Bangladesh to Saudi Arabia
- In office 2 February 1988 – 31 December 1991
- President: Hussain Muhammad Ershad; Shahabuddin Ahmed; Abdur Rahman Biswas
- Preceded by: Hedayet Ahmad
- Succeeded by: Abdul Momen Choudhury

Permanent Representative to the OIC and IDB
- In office 1988–1991
- President: Hussain Muhammad Ershad; Shahabuddin Ahmed; Abdur Rahman Biswas

Bangladesh High Commissioner to the Australia
- In office 1984–1988
- President: Hussain Muhammad Ershad

Ambassador of Bangladesh to Pakistan
- In office 19 June 1982 – 1 January 1984
- President: Hussain Muhammad Ershad; Ahsanuddin Chowdhury
- Preceded by: A.K.M. Nazrul Islam
- Succeeded by: Abul Ahsan

Bangladesh Ambassador to the Kingdom of Thailand
- In office 27 May 1978 – 2 June 1982
- President: Ziaur Rahman; Abdus Sattar; Hussain Muhammad Ershad; Ahsanuddin Chowdhury
- Preceded by: A. K. M. Nazrul Islam
- Succeeded by: M. Mohsin

Permanent Representative to the United Nations ESCAP and ADB
- In office 1979–1982
- President: Ziaur Rahman; Abdus Sattar; Hussain Muhammad Ershad

3rd Director General of Bangladesh Rifles
- In office 1 November 1975 – 14 December 1977
- President: Khondaker Mostaq Ahmad; Abu Sadat Mohammad Sayem; Ziaur Rahman
- Preceded by: M Khalilur Rahman
- Succeeded by: Muhammad Atiqur Rahman

Personal details
- Born: 23 September 1932 Calcutta, Bengal, British India
- Died: 17 October 2008 (aged 76) Dhaka, Bangladesh
- Education: Pakistan Military Academy; University of Peshawar
- Profession: Military officer, diplomat

Military service
- Allegiance: Bangladesh; Pakistan (before 1971)
- Branch/service: Pakistan Army; Bangladesh Army; Bangladesh Rifles
- Years of service: 1953–1977
- Rank: Major General
- Unit: East Bengal Regiment
- Commands: Director general of Bangladesh Rifles; Commander of 65th Independent Infantry Brigade; Commandant of East Bengal Regimental Centre; Area commander of Logistics Area; Commander of 72nd Independent Infantry Brigade; C.O. of 1st East Bengal Regiment
- Battles/wars: Indo-Pakistani War of 1965

Quazi Golam Dastgir (23 September 1932 – 17 October 2008) was a Bangladesh army general and diplomat. From 1975 to 1977, he served as the "Zonal Martial Law Administrator" (the equivalent of a state governor in the military-backed government headed by President Abu Sadat Mohammad Sayem) for Dhaka Division.

== Early life and education ==
Born on 23 September 1932 (official birthday 1 June, 1933) in Calcutta, General Dastgir studied in St. Xavier's College, Calcutta and subsequently graduated from Peshawar University.

== Military career ==
=== Pakistan Army ===
He joined the Pakistan Military Academy in February 1951 and was commissioned on 14 February 1953 with 7th PMA Long Course as a second lieutenant in the First Battalion of the East Bengal Regiment ("Senior Tigers"). Later he graduated from the United States Army Infantry School at Fort Benning and the Command and Staff College at Quetta. During the 1950s and 1960s, he served as G-3 and company commander, brigade major of an independent brigade, battalion commander, and G-1 of an independent division.

Following the 1965 Indo-Pakistan War, he received six months antedate seniority.

=== Bangladesh Army ===
He was interned in West Pakistan during the 1971 Bangladesh Liberation War. Dastgir was repatriated back to Dhaka, Bangladesh after his release from Pakistani confinement, and was promoted to the rank of full colonel in 1973 after absorption in the Bangladesh Army with the Bangladesh Army service number BA-48. He was appointed Chief of Logistics – the combined positions of quartermaster general (QMG) and master general of ordnance (MGO), each post headed by a lieutenant general currently – at the new Army Headquarters in Dhaka, the capital of Bangladesh. In rapid succession during 1974 he commanded two independent brigades – the 72 Infantry Brigade (later upgraded to the 66th Infantry Division) stationed at Rangpur and the 65 Infantry Brigade (later upgraded to the 24th Infantry Division) stationed at Chittagong – and was promoted to the rank of brigadier in 1975. During this time he led Operation Dragon Drive, the first successful joint army-navy-air force military operation in Bangladesh, earning him the Bangladesh Army's highest operational medal the Jatiyo Nirapatya Padak. While commanding the Chittagong Area, he also served as the ex officio commandant of the East Bengal Regimental Centre (EBRC) – a position nicknamed "Papa Tiger".

In August, 1975, Dastgir became the first Bangladesh Army formation commander to be promoted to major general and subsequently was appointed director general of Bangladesh Rifles, the border security force, and served until December 1977. In November, 1975 he was appointed Zonal Martial Law Administrator (ZMLA) of Dhaka Division. During this time he led the Bangladesh delegation for border talks with India held in Calcutta in 1975 and New Delhi in 1976.

Despite ample opportunities, Dastgir refused to do politics in uniform and requested to be relieved of his role as ZMLA of Dhaka Division to enable him to focus on his military duties just as the chief of army staff General Ziaur Rahman took over as President of Bangladesh.

== Diplomatic career ==
In December 1977, he was transferred to the Ministry of Foreign Affairs as a full, permanent secretary to the government of Bangladesh. Dastgir was appointed the Ambassador of Bangladesh to Thailand (and later concurrently accredited to the Philippines) in May 1978 and served till June 1982. During this time he also served as his country's Permanent Representative to the United Nations Economic and Social Commission for Asia and the Pacific (ESCAP) and the Asian Development Bank (ADB). As the country's permanent representative to ESCAP, Dastgir played a key role in the election of Bangladesh Foreign Secretary Shah A M S Kibria as the executive secretary of the United Nations commission. It was at a reception at his house in Bangkok, Thailand that he broached the idea of an association of South Asian nations in the ASEAN model to the Bhutanese foreign minister, and this started discussions which led to the proclamation of SAARC (the South Asian Association for Regional Cooperation) by Bangladesh President Ziaur Rahman, after extensive diplomatic groundwork done by Dastgir's brother-in-law then Bangladesh Foreign Secretary Ambassador Humayun Rasheed Choudhury who went on to become the president of the 41st UN General Assembly.

From 1984 to 1988 the general served as the high commissioner of Bangladesh to Australia with concurrent accreditation to New Zealand, Papua New Guinea and Fiji. In 1984 he attended the Commonwealth Heads of Government Regional Meeting in Papua New Guinea, and served as the leader of the Bangladesh delegation to the Tenth Asian and Pacific Labour Ministers Conference held in Melbourne in October 1985. Later that year (1985), he led the Bangladesh delegation to the 44th International Cotton Advisory Committee meeting held in Sydney from 28 October to 1 November.

In 1988 he was appointed Ambassador of Bangladesh to Saudi Arabia with concurrent accreditation to Jordan, Niger and Yemen. During this time, General Dastgir also served as the permanent representative of Bangladesh to the Organization of Islamic Conference (OIC), the Islamic Development Bank (IDB), and the Saudi Fund for Development. As the country's permanent representative to the OIC, Dastgir played a key role in the election of Bangladeshi candidate Ambassador Mohammad Mohsin as the deputy secretary general of the organisation. During his tenure to Saudi Arabia, Dastgir was instrumental in the decision of the government of Bangladesh to send a contingent of troops, consisting of the First East Bengal Regiment (his own battalion) as part of Operation Desert Storm. This was Bangladesh's first participation in an international military coalition, and paved the way for the Bangladesh Armed Forces to take part in future United Nations peacekeeping operations across various world theatres. At this time Dastgir gave an interview to the Voice of America and spoke about regional security, including the steps taken by the Saudi government to ensure the safety of Bangladesh nationals affected by the first Gulf War. In September, 1991 Ambassador Dastgir was decorated with the King Abdul Aziz Order (Class 1) by King Fahd of Saudi Arabia.

== Post-retirement ==
In 1997, he was elected chairman of the Retired Armed Forces Officers Welfare Association (RAOWA)– Bangladesh's only veteran's association for army, navy and air force officers—and served a two-year term. Elected to the Bangladesh chapter of the Royal Commonwealth Society in 1998, Dastgir served as its Presidium Member and vice-president until 2005.

== Personal life ==
In 1965 Dastgir married Kohinoor Rasheed Choudhury, the daughter of industrialist-cum-legislator and Member of British India's Central Legislative Assembly Abdur Rasheed Choudhury and Member of the Pakistan National Assembly Serajunnessa Choudhury of Sylhet, East Pakistan (currently Bangladesh).

== Awards and decorations ==

Nirapattya Padak (Nirapattya Padak)	Joy Padak (Joy Padak)	Songbidhan Padak (Songbidhan Padak)	Jesthata Padak III (Jesthata Padak III)
Jesthata Padak II (Jesthata Padak II)	Jesthata Padak I (Jesthata Padak I)	Tamgha-e-Jang 1965 War (War Medal 1965)	Tamgha-e-Jamhuria (Republic Commemoration Medal) 1956

== Death and legacy ==
In September 2008, Dastgir fell seriously ill with undiagnosed ailments and had to be hospitalised for about a month. He returned home on 10 October 2008. He died in his sleep at his Dhaka residence on 17 October 2008.

Dastgir was one of the best known Bengali army officers of his time – and was apparently considered by the CIA to be the most likely person to lead the Bangladesh Army in case of war. Following his active military service, he had a distinguished career as a diplomat during his four terms as ambassador. Described as an "upright officer of the old school".
