= K Force (Bangladesh) =

K Force কে ফোর্স
- Active: 14 October 1971 - 16 December 1971
- Country: Bangladesh
- Allegiance: Provisional Government of Bangladesh
- Type: Brigade
- Garrison/HQ: Agartala

Commanders
- Commanding officer: Khaled Mosharraf

K Force was a military brigade of Bangladesh Forces in 1971 headed by Major Khaled Mosharraf as per the direction of the Provisional Government of Bangladesh in exile. The brigade was a part of regular army under the Bangladesh Armed Forces formed with the 4th, 9th and 10th Battalion of East Bengal Regiment.

== Background ==
The Bengali military officers of Pakistan Army hailed from the then East Pakistan joined hands with the liberation movement of Bangladesh and revolted against the Pakistan Army after the Operation Searchlight took place on the night of 25 March 1971.

Major Khaled Mosharraf, an officer of the 4th East Bengal Regiment who was sent off by the military officials of Pakistan Army from Comilla Cantonment to Sylhet on 24 March, revolted against Pakistan Army on 26 March with his unit.

Mosharraf was later selected as the sector commander of Sector-2 during Bangladesh Liberation War as he showed tremendous courage. He was later asked to form a brigade as a regular force in order to establish effective control over the liberated zones that were liberated by the freedom fighters of Sector-02 and to operate large scale operations in Sector-2 against the Pakistan Army establishments.

== Inception ==
Considering the possibilities of a prolonged liberation movement, the Provisional Government of Bangladesh decided to a regular military force to continue the arms struggle for a longer period of time.

As a part of this planning process the government directed the senior military officials of Bangladesh Armed Forces Major Ziaur Rahman, Mosharraf and Major K M Shafiullah to form brigades.

Being directed by the government Major Khaled Mosharraf formed the K Force in the last week of September while Major Ziaur Rahman formed Z Force and Major K M Shafiullah formed the S Force.

The brigade headquarters for K Force was in Agartala.

== Formation ==
The formation of K force was a reorganisation of the independence fighters of 4th East Bengal Regiment and the others who were trained for Bangladesh Liberation War under Sector-2.

The C Company of 4th East Bengal Regiment along with the freedom fighters under the Sector-2 headquarters were gathered at Konabon under the 4th East Bengal Regiment and were reorganized under the captaincy of Major M.A. Gaffar Haldar.

The 9th East Bengal Regiment was formed under the leadership of Captain Ainuddin, composed of all the independence fighters of the D Company and a number of soldiers from B Company of 4th East Bengal Regiment. The newly formed regiment was gathered at Kosba for further reorganisation.

All the independence fighters from A Company and the rest of B Company soldiers were reorganised under the 10th East Bengal Regiment led by Major Abdus Saleq Chowdhury at Belunia.

In addition, an artillery battery called Mujib battery was added led by Captain Abdul Aziz Pasha.

== Structure of the Brigade ==
- Brigade Commander - Major Khaled Mosharraf (14 October - 23 October) and Major Abdus Saleq Chowdhury (24 October - 16 December)
- Staff Officer – Captain MA Matin
- Staff officer – Lieutenant Anwarul Alam

=== 4th East Bengal Regiment ===
- Commanding Officer – Major M. A. Gaffar Haldar

=== 9th East Bengal Regiment ===
- Commanding Officer – Captain Muhammad Ainuddin

=== 10th East Bengal Regiment ===
- Commanding Officer – Major Abdus Saleq Chowdhury (14 October - 23 October) and Captain Zafar Imam (24 October - 16 December)

=== 1st Field Artillery Battery ===
- Commanding Officer – Captain Abdul Aziz Pasha

== See also ==
- S Force (Bangladesh)
