= S Force (Bangladesh) =

S Force এস ফোর্স
- Active: October 1, 1971-December 16, 1971
- Country: Bangladesh
- Allegiance: Provisional Government of Bangladesh
- Type: Brigade
- Garrison/HQ: Fatikchhara

Commanders
- Commanding officer: K M Shafiullah

S Force was a military brigade of the Bangladesh Armed Forces that was formed under the leadership of Major K M Shafiullah on October 1, 1971. The brigade was composed of the 2nd and 11th East Bengal Regiment.

== Background ==
In early 1971, the mostly Bengali population of what was then East Pakistan were demanding autonomy. On March 25, 1971, the Pakistan Army cracked down. To crush opposition, they arrested or killed Bengali leaders, intellectuals, and university students, and attempted to disarm Bengali military and police personnel. The army's actions so enraged some Bengali military officers that they revolted and joined the Bangladesh Liberation War.

The officers of the 2nd East Bengal Regiment, situated in the Joydevpur Cantonment 25 miles (40 km) from the capital Dhaka, revolted and left the cantonment on March 28, under the leadership of K M Shafiullah. Major Shafiullah was initially selected as the sector 3 commander.

At the end of June, considering the need of regular brigades to intensify the war against the Pakistan Army, the Provisional Government of Bangladesh decided to form three brigades under the leadership of Majors Ziaur Rahman, Khaled Mosharraf and Shafiullah.

== Formation ==
Shafiullah, once the second-in-command of the 2nd East Bengal Regiment, was given the mission of organizing a brigade in September 1971. Major ANM Nuruzzaman replaced him as the new commander of sector 3.

Shafiullah reorganized the two battalions of freedom fighters he had with him who were fighting in sector 3 to form a brigade that is popularly known as S Force. The two battalions were the 2nd and 11th East Bengal Regiment.

He added 1,200 new recruits to bring the brigade up to strength after an initial selection process. The new recruits were trained for two months.

The headquarters of S Force was in Fatikchhara.

== Organization of the brigade ==
- Brigade Commander - Major K M Shafiullah
- Brigade Major – Captain Azizur Rahman
- D-Q Officer - Captain Abul Hossain
- Signal Officer – Flight Lieutenant Rauf

=== 2nd East Bengal Regiment ===
- Commanding Officer - Major Moinul Hossain Chowdhury
- Adjutant - Lieutenant Mohammad Sayed
- A Company Commander – Major Matiur Rahman
- B Company Commander – Lieutenant Badiuzzaman
- C Company Commander - Lieutenant Syed Mohammad Ibrahim
- D Company Commander – Lieutenant Ghulam Helal Morshed
- A Company Officer – Second Lieutenant Anisul Hasan
- B Company Officer - Second Lieutenant Salim Mohammad Kamrul Hasan
- Medical Officer - Lieutenant Abul Hossain

=== 11th East Bengal Regiment ===
- Commanding Officer - Major Abu Saleh Mohammad Nasim
- Adjutant - Lieutenant Nasir
- A Company Commander - Lieutenant Shamsul Huda Bacchu
- B Company Commander – Captain Subid Ali Bhuyan
- C Company Commander - Second Lieutenant Nazrul Islam
- D Company Commander - Second Lieutenant Abul Hossain
- B Company Officer - Second Lieutenant Kabir
- Medical Officer - Lieutenant Moinul Hossain

== Major operations ==
S Force was ready for battle by the last week of November. It operated in Akhaura, Mukundpur, Dharmaghar and many other places from the end of November until the independence of Bangladesh was achieved.

== See also ==
- Z Force (Bangladesh)
- K Force (Bangladesh)
- List of sectors in the Bangladesh Liberation War
