= Wakar Hasan =

Bangladesh army major

- ওয়াকার হাসান
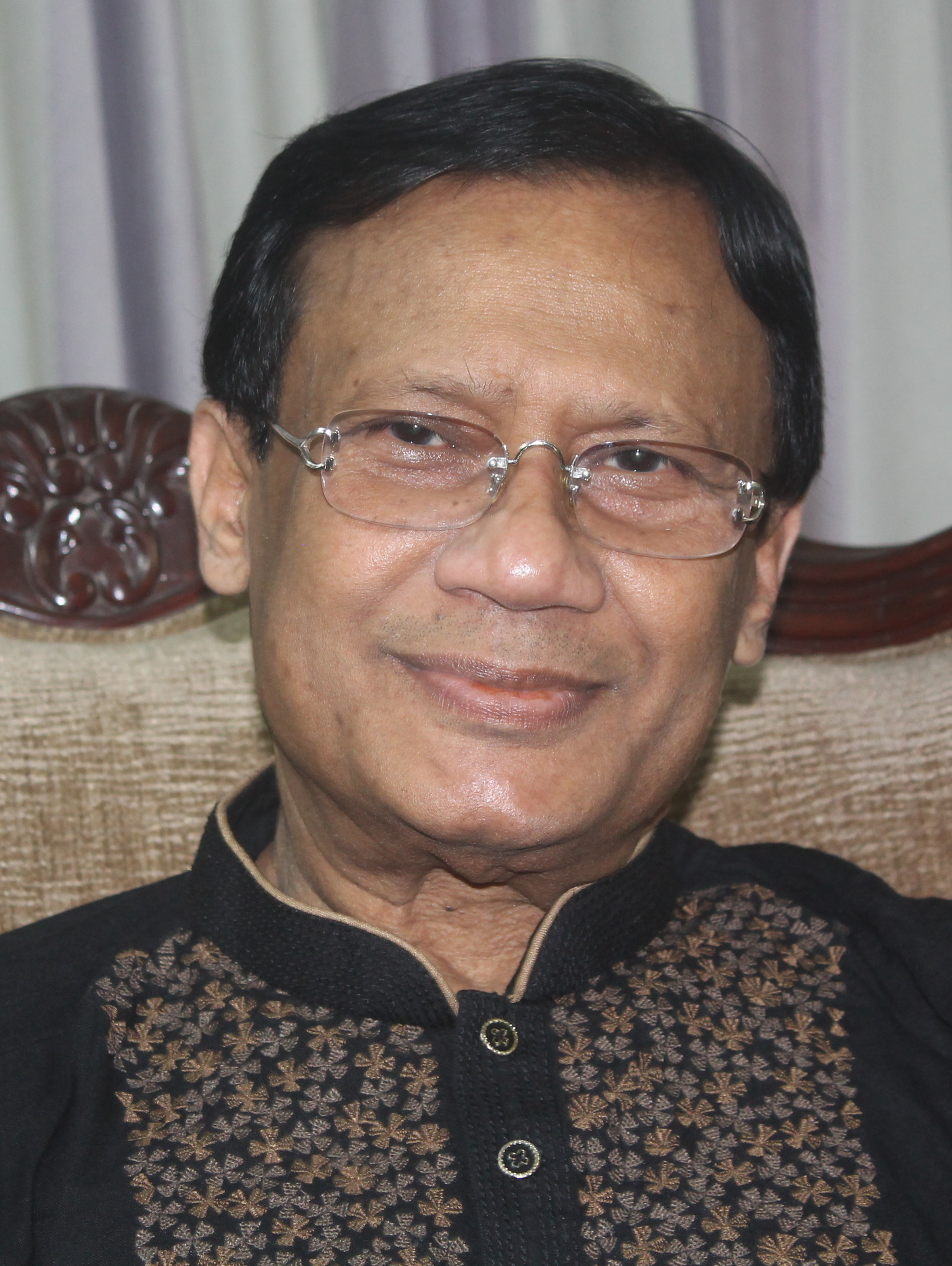
- Wakar Hassan, Dhaka 2018
- Born: January 14, 1948 (age 78); Dacca, East Bengal, Pakistan
- Spouse: Mahmuda Akhter
- Military career
- Allegiance: Bangladesh; Pakistan (before 1971)
- Branch: Bangladesh Army; Pakistan Army
- Service years: 1968-1981
- Rank: Major
- Unit: Corps of Engineers
- Commands: Deputy Commander of Z Force; Company Commander of 1st East Bengal Regiment
- Conflicts: Bangladesh Liberation War
- Awards: Bir Protik

Wakar Hasan, Bir Protik was a Bangladesh Army major and a member of the Mukti Bahini in the Bangladesh Liberation War. For his courage in the war of liberation, the government of Bangladesh gave him the title of Bir Protik.

== Early life, family and education ==
Wakar Hasan was born in Dhaka. His father's name is AHM Habibul Islam and mother's name is Shamsun Nahar. His wife's name is Mahmuda Akhter. The couple have two daughters and one son. In 1971 Wakar Hasan was the first year student of Rajshahi Engineering College.

== Working life ==
When the Bangladesh liberation war started in 1971, Hasan fled to India. At the time of primary training in a camp there, he joined the first Bangladesh Commander Officers Warfare. After the training, he was included in the Z-Force's first Bengal Regiment. He fought in Sreemangal, Patrakhola, Hosnabad, Chargram, MC College and other places in greater Sylhet district.

== Role of the liberation war ==
Kainighat area of Sylhet District was a strong base of the Pakistan Army in 1971. On 24–25 November, there was a large group of Mukti Bahini formed in different places in the first East Bengal Regiment. Wakar Hasan was the Commander of the 12th Platoon of the Delta Company. There are several villages around Kainighat-Gauripur, Big Chattal, Daliya Char etc. A small wetland named Anand wetland. The river flowing through the middle of the Surma River. On 24–25 November, Pakistan Army suddenly attacked the Mukti Bahini's alpha company at Gauripur. On 26 November 1971 at 4AM, the Pakistan Army's 31 Punjab Regiment suddenly attacked the Mukti Bahini's first East Bengal Regiment on Delta Company's part. The platoon number 11 of Delta Company of Mukti Bahini was almost devastated by their attack. Subedar Musa was led by this platoon. Waqar Hasan was at a distance of several hundred meters to his left. After receiving the news over Wireless, he took the 23-24 freedom fighters to a position of Platoon number 11 in the spotlight and made a counter-attack on the Pakistan Army. The battle lasted for several hours. Pakistanis were cornered by Wakar Hasan's unit. In the battle, Wakar Hasan displayed heroic fighting against the Pakistan Army. About 88 soldiers of the Punjab Regiment were killed in the battle and 26 were captured.

== See also ==
- Awards and decorations of the Bangladesh Armed Forces
- Military ranks of Bangladesh
- Bir Protik
- Bir Bikrom
- Bir Uttom
- Bir Sreshtho
