= Salauddin Mumtaz =

Bangladesh Army officer, recipient of Bir Uttom (1945–1971)

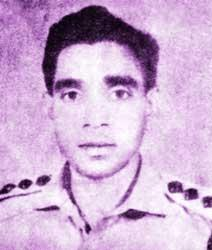
- Born: 23 August 1945; Feni, Bengal, British India
- Died: 31 July 1971 (aged 25); Kamalpur, Dhaka, Bangladesh
- Military career
- Allegiance: Pakistan (Before 1971); Bangladesh
- Branch: Pakistan Air Force; Pakistan Army; Bangladesh Army
- Service years: 1966–1971
- Rank: Captain
- Unit: East Bengal Regiment
- Commands: Company Commander in Z Force; Sub-Commander of Sector 11
- Conflicts: Bangladesh Liberation War; Battle of Kamalpur †
- Awards: Bir Uttom

Salauddin Mumtaz BU (Bengali: সালাহউদ্দিন মমতাজ; 23 August 1945 – 31 July 1971) was a Bengali military officer during the Bangladesh Liberation War.

In Bangladesh he is honorifically designated Shahid ("martyr") for dying for the Bangladeshi cause. He was also posthumously given the title Bir Uttom, meaning "better among braves" in Bengali, the second-highest Bangladeshi award for gallantry. He is famous for one of his last quotes: "Yahya [the Pakistani president] don't have the bullet to stop Salauddin," which ultimately proved true when, after all other efforts failed, the Pakistan Army only stopped him with a mortar bomb.

== Early life ==
Mumtaz was born in 1945 in Mukterbari, a village in North Charipoor, Feni District. His paternal grandfather was the Muslim zamindar of Akyab in Burma (Myanmar) and his maternal grandfather Moulove Abdur Razzak was a Member of the Legislative Assembly (MLA) of the Bengal Legislative Assembly of British India. His father, Shamsuddin Ahmedan, was a lawyer who earned his LLB degree from Aligarh Muslim University and started his law practice in Kolkata. Young Salauddin started his schooling while living with his parents in that city. After the Independence of Pakistan, his family returned to Feni, where Salauddin completed his primary education at Debipur Primary School. He passed his tenth-year Matriculation exam at Feni Government Pilot High School. He studied for the twelfth-year Indian School Certificate (ISC) at three colleges: Comilla Victoria Government College, then Doyal Shing College, then back at Feni Government College where he finally passed. While studying for a bachelor of science degree at Feni College he joined the Pakistan Air Force; he later shifted to the Pakistani Army (Infantry Division) where he reached the rank of captain.

== War of Independence ==
In 1971 Salauddin was posted in Lahore in what was then West Pakistan. On 3 July 1971, with the intention of leaving Pakistan to join the independence fight in Bangladesh, he crossed the river Monawara Tabi of Maral Area and entered India. At that time his companions were Mohiuddin Jahangir, Shahriar, and Anam. This incident got wide coverage in the world media of the time. He reported to the Government of Bangladesh High Commission in exile at Kolkata and joined the East Bengal Regiment. He was not able to see his mother at Feni; instead he was sent to his regiment, which was at Teldhala Camp, Meghalaya, India.

The Z Force under the command of Major Ziaur Rahman was active at Teldhala. Salauddin joined this force and was appointed commander of its Delta Company. He participated in a dangerous plan to attack a Border Out Post (BOP) at Kamalpur. On 28 July he led a reconnaissance patrol, which encountered two Pakistani soldiers. Salahuddin fought with one of them and with the help of Subedar Hai killed him and took his rifle. By this time firing had started from the Pakistani side. Subedar Hai snatched another rifle from the other soldier, who was killed by Nayek Shafi. Salahuddin and his party returned to their camp with those two rifles.

The attack on Kamalpur BOP was launched on the night of 30–31 July 1971 under the command of Major Moinul Hossain Chowdhury. The attack was made with two companies, Delta and Bravo, from northeast of the enemy camp. Captain Salauddin Mumtaz commanded Delta on the left and Captain Hafiz commanded Bravo on the right. Battalion 'R' group under Major Moin was a backup force, with Major Zia present. As the troops were moving towards the enemy post, enemy artillery started heavy fire. As a result, the progress of the two companies slowed and they suffered casualties. The troop of Salauddin continued moving forward and entered the outer perimeter of the enemy camp, forcing the enemy had to withdraw from their front line. Delta Company crossed the Pakistani bunker area, entered the community center near the BOP, and started a very close-range fight. Subeder Hai and his group came very close to a Pakistani minefield. Salahuddin was at the right side of that group. A bomb exploded before Subedar Hai and he lost his hand. Salahuddin pushed forward, pursuing Pakistani soldiers. Despite losses, the Bangladeshi fighters made progress through the minefield.

On 31 July 1971, Punjab Regiment of Pakistan Army fired two mortar shells at Captain Salahuddin Mumtaz and he was killed.

== Recognition ==
In addition to his designation as a Shahid and Bir Uttom, a cantonment of the Bangladeshi Army is named for him: Shahid Salahuddin Cantonment (Ghatail).
