= Khaled Mosharraf =

Bangladeshi revolutionary and freedom fighter (1937–1975)

Khaled Mosharraf BU
- Major General Mosharraf in Colonel insignia (c. 1972)

4th Chief of Army Staff
- In office 4 November 1975 – 7 November 1975
- President: Khondaker Mostaq Ahmad; Abu Sadat Mohammad Sayem
- Preceded by: Ziaur Rahman
- Succeeded by: Ziaur Rahman

1st Chief Martial Law Administrator
- In office 3 November 1975 – 6 November 1975
- President: Abu Sadat Mohammad Sayem
- Preceded by: Position established
- Succeeded by: Abu Sadat Mohammad Sayem

Personal details
- Born: 9 November 1937 Islampur, Bengal, British India
- Died: 7 November 1975 (aged 37) Dacca Cantonment, Bangladesh
- Cause of death: Assassination
- Spouse: Salma Khaled
- Relations: Rashed Mosharraf (brother); Sayed Farooq-ur-Rahman (Nephew)
- Children: 3, including Mahjabeen Khaled
- Education: Pakistan Military Academy
- Awards: Bir Uttom

Military service
- Allegiance: Pakistan (before 1971); Bangladesh (after 1971)
- Branch/service: Bangladesh Army; Pakistan Army
- Years of service: 1958–1975
- Rank: Major General
- Unit: East Bengal Regiment
- Commands: Commander of Sector – II; Commander of K Force; Chief of Logistics, Army Headquarters; Chief of General Staff at Army Headquarters; Chief of Army Staff
- Battles/wars: Indo-Pakistani War of 1965; Bangladesh Liberation War; Operation Jackpot; First Siege of Dhaka; Second Siege of Dhaka †

Khaled Mosharraf (Bengali: খালেদ মোশাররফ; 9 November 1937 – 7 November 1975) was a major general in the Bangladesh Army, who is known for his role in the Bangladesh Liberation War and the subsequent coups in post-independence Bangladesh. After deposing Khondakar Mustaq Ahmad in the 3 November 1975 coup, Mosharraf was assassinated on 7 November 1975.

During the outset of the Bangladesh Liberation War, Mosharraf was second in command of the 4th East Bengal Regiment in Comilla, which revolted against Pakistan on 27 March 1971. During the war, Mosharraf was appointed the sector commander of sector 2, in addition to leading K Force and Crack Platoon. After being wounded in combat, A.T.M. Haider was appointed the new sector commander of sector 2.

After the war ended, Mosharraf was awarded Bir Uttom, the second highest gallantry award, and was appointed chief of general staff of the Bangladesh Army. Following the assassination of Sheikh Mujibur Rahman, the chain of command in the military broke down, which Mosharraf intended to restore on 3 November 1975 by removing Khondakar Mustaq Ahmad from power and exiling army officers responsible for Mujib's assassination. On 7 November 1975, a counter-coup was organised by Lt. Colonel Abu Taher and his clandestine group Biplobi Shainik Sangstha, during which Mosharraf was killed, alongside Lt. Colonel A.T.M. Haider and Colonel Nazmul Huda.

== Birth and family background ==
Khaled Mosharraf was born on 9 November 1937 to a Bengali Muslim family in a village now known as Mosharrafganj in Islampur of Jamalpur subdivision at Mymensingh district, Bengal Province. He was a son of Mosharraf Hossain and Jamila Akhter. His father, Mosharraf Hossain, was a successful businessman in the jute trade, and his home village, Mosharrafganj, was named after him. His family is described as being a landed clan and active in the politics of Bengal at the time.

== Education and army training ==
Mosharraf completed his matriculation examination at Cox Bazar High School in 1953 and his IA examination from Dhaka College in 1955.

After graduating from Dhaka College, Mosharraf immediately joined the Pakistan Army and attended the Pakistan Military Academy in Kakul. During the 1965 Indo-Pakistan War, Mosharraf served as the adjutant of the 4th Bengal Regiment. Subsequently, he received additional training in West Germany and Britain and served as an instructor in the Kakul academy.

== Bangladesh Liberation War ==
=== 4th East Bengal Regiment ===
During the outset of the 1971 Bangladesh Liberation War, Major Mosharraf was the brigade major of the 57th Infantry Brigade, which was based in Dhaka. On 22 March 1971, he was posted to Comilla as the second in command of the 4th East Bengal Regiment (EBR). On 24 March, while Mosharraf was on his way to Shamshernagar, his military vehicles were stopped by civilians at Brahmanbaria, who informed Mosharraf that Pakistani troops were killing civilians. After being informed by Major Shafaat Jamil of the situation in Dhaka, Mosharraf led a mutiny of the 4th EBR on 27 March. He arrested his CO, Lt. Colonel Malik, along with two other West Pakistani officers, and handed them over to the Indian army, with the request that they be treated as POWs and repatriated once hostilities ceased. According to Major General Khadim Hussain Raja, Mosharraf "acted with decency" and after the war, "Lt. Colonel Malik was all praises for Major Khalid Mosharraf."

The troops of the 4th EBR wanted to go to Dhaka to fight the Pakistani army, but Mosharraf warned that:

You may kill only a few Pakistani soldiers and you may also get killed. Presently your life is very precious for our country, if you stay alive you could train hundreds of young people to become soldiers and fight for our motherland. Yes, we will have to fight the Pakistan Army someday soon, but not now. This is not the time to go for confrontation and we need to re-equip and gain our strength.

=== Sector Commander of Sector 2 ===
On 4 April 1971, a conference was held at Teliapara under the leadership of Colonel M.A.G. Osmani, where it was agreed that eastern Bangladesh should be divided into four sectors, with Mosharraf being assigned to command sector 2, which comprised Comilla, Dhaka, Faridpur, and part of Noakhali.

=== Crack Platoon ===
In June 1971, Mosharraf and A.T.M. Haider formed a special commando team known as Crack Platoon, whose objective was to terrorise the Pakistani Army. The Crack Platoon carried out a number of operations in Dhaka, including a grenade attack on 9 June and an attack at 5 divergent power stations on 19 July. Mosharraf was wounded by a gunshot to the head on 23 October 1971 and was treated at a military hospital in Lucknow Cantonment.

== Post-independence Bangladesh ==
After Bangladesh gained independence, Mosharraf was promoted to colonel and awarded Bir Uttom, the second highest gallantry award of Bangladesh. He was initially appointed chief of logistics at army headquarters. Later, Mosharraf was elevated to brigadier and posted as chief of general staff on 14 April 1972, replacing Major General Abdur Rab.

=== 15 August 1975 Coup ===
When Sheikh Mujibur Rahman was killed on 15 August 1975, Mosharraf was instructed by General Ziaur Rahman to prepare an operation in the case of an intervention by the Indian army. Following the 15 August coup, the chain of command broke down in the Bangladesh army, as the junior officers who led the coup began 'acting like generals'. Wanting to restore order, Mosharraf organised meetings on 18 and 19 August, which were attended by the commanders of the army, police, and BDR.

The junior officers who organised the 15 August coup were staying in Bangabhaban with the new president, Khandakar Mustaq Ahmad. On 22 August, Mosharraf visited Mustaq and requested that the troops stationed at Bangabhaban be removed, which Mustaq refused. On 24 August, Ziaur Rahman replaced K.M. Shafiullah as the chief of army staff.

=== 3 November 1975 Coup ===
During the early hours of 3 November 1975, Mosharraf and Colonel Shafaat Jamil used the Dhaka Brigade to capture all key points around the capital, except for Bangabhaban. Ziaur Rahman was forced to resign as chief of army staff and Mosharraf appointed himself as major general and declared himself the new chief of army staff. The leaders of the 15 August coup, along with the artillery and armoured troops under their command, were holding out at Bangabhaban. To avoid a confrontation, Mosharraf allowed the junior army officers involved in the 15 August coup to leave Bangladesh unharmed. Before the junior army officers left, a group of soldiers under their command killed four national leaders of the provisional government in Dhaka Central Jail.

=== 7 November 1975 Coup ===
Before Ziaur Rahman was arrested in the early hours of 3 November 1975, he made a phone call to his friend Lt. Colonel (retired) Abu Taher and urged him to do something. In response, Taher and his clandestine group Biplobi Shainik Sangstha (BSS) held meetings every night between 4 and 6 November in preparation for an uprising, which was launched during the early hours of 7 November. When the coup began, Mosharraf was at Bangabhaban with A.T.M. Haider and Nazmul Huda.

Upon realising that their 3 November coup had been undone, Khaled Mosharraf, A.T.M. Haider, and Nazmul Huda left Bangabhaban to seek safety at the headquarters of the 10 Bengal Regiment. Although the soldiers of the 10 Bengal Regiment did not have any direct link to the Biplobi Shainik Sangstha, they came to know about the mutiny. Colonel Nawazesh, who was the commanding officer of the 10 Bengal Regiment, received a phone call from Ziaur Rahman, who asked Nawazesh to ensure the safety of Mosharraf and his companions.

Nawazesh held a meeting with other officers of the 10 Bengal Regiment, during which two officers, Captain Asad and Captain Jalil, allegedly said, "Let the bastards come, we'll sort them out", referring to Mosharraf.

== Assassination ==
When Mosharraf, Haider, and Huda arrived at the headquarters of the 10 Bengal Regiment, Colonel Nawazesh climbed on top of a jeep and ordered the troops not to harm the three men. However, the soldiers were defiant and threatened to kill Nawazesh if he tried to stop them. An eyewitness claimed that Captain Asad and Captain Jalil led their troops upstairs, where Mosharraf was staying. Mosharraf and Huda were dragged outside and killed by automatic gunfire, while Haider was killed by a single gunshot after he tried to reach for his pistol. After Mosharraf was killed, Colonel Nawazesh informed Ziaur Rahman of the incident, stating, "I am sorry sir, situation got out of hand". Zia asked Nawazesh to preserve the bodies of the three men.

While it is unclear what prompted Asad and Jalil to kill Mosharraf, Anthony Mascarenhas has suggested that at least one of them was influenced by Lt. Colonel Taher.

== Legacy ==
In May 2023, police opened an investigation into the killings of Khaled Mosharraf, Nazmul Huda, and A.T.M. Haider after the daughter of Huda, Naheed Ezaher Khan, filed a case with Sher-e-Bangla Nagar Police Station. Khan held several army officers responsible, including Ziaur Rahman and Abu Taher. The BNP criticised Khan for including Ziaur Rahman in the case, as Zia ordered Colonel Nawazesh to protect Mosharraf, Huda, and Haider.

| Preceded by Major General Ziaur Rahman | Chief of Army Staff, Bangladesh; 3–7 November 1975 | Succeeded by Major General Ziaur Rahman |
