= Z Force (Bangladesh) =

Z Force জেড ফোর্স
- Active: 7 July 1971 – 16 December 1971
- Country: Bangladesh
- Allegiance: Provisional Government of Bangladesh
- Branch: Mukti Bahini
- Type: Brigade
- Garrison/HQ: Teldhala, Tura, Meghalaya

Commanders
- Commanding officer: Ziaur Rahman

Z Force, also known as the Tura Brigade, was the first military brigade of Bangladesh Forces, formed during the Liberation War of Bangladesh in 1971 under Major Ziaur Rahman along with the consent of the revolutionary government of Bangladesh in exile. The brigade was formed with the 1st, 3rd and 8th Battalion of East Bengal Regiment on 7 July 1971. It is the first ever complete brigade formed during the Liberation War of Bangladesh in 1971.

== Background ==
Bangladeshi military officers of various cantonments revolted against the Pakistani Army and started fighting against them with limited ammunition on the night of 25 March 1971 after the crackdown by Pakistani Army. But soon the military officers of Bangladesh Forces realised that such non-planned attack or resistance will not be able to create huge casualties of the foes. So they decided to form some sectors from which they can fight properly.

The guerrillas sent from India during May–June to various sectors were ill-equipped and not properly trained and hence were unsuccessful in almost every operation. Most of the guerrillas were caught or shot dead by Pakistani Army.

The lack of communication between the Sector Commanders and the Indian Military Officers also created major casualties to the guerrillas sent by the Indian officers to Bangladesh. Wherever the guerrillas were caught or killed, Pakistani Army in search of the other members of them used to start arson in many villages and killed numerous innocent people to take revenge.

In this situation, senior military officers assumed that the war will continue for a long time and decided to form some brigades to fight against the Pakistani Army more effectively, especially in the frontiers.

== Inception ==
After the sector commanders' meeting held at 8, Theater Road of Kolkata, the first brigade of Bangladesh Forces was formed. Major Ziaur Rahman, who was promoted to Lieutenant Colonel during the Liberation War of Bangladesh was the senior most officer amongst the officers present there and he was given the command of the force.

Though the brigade was formed after the meeting, the decision to form the force was decided earlier. Chief of Bangladesh Forces M.A.G Osmani himself told Major Moinul Hossain about the decision on 13 June 1971. But according to the gazette of the Government of Bangladesh the force is known to be formed on 7 July 1971.

The headquarters of the brigade was at Teldhala of Tura in India.

== Formation and training ==
The 'Z Force' established their camp in the remote Tura area of Meghalaya. But with massive spirit and interest for the freedom, people of various ages and occupations gathered under the brigade.

'Z Force' had to organise themselves properly. It was formed with 1st, 3rd and 8th battalion of East Bengal Regiment. Of them the 1st Battalion of East Bengal Regiment, who revolted in Jessore Cantonment under Major Hafiz was unable to escape safely and after fighting a crucial battle only fifty of the Bengali officers and soldiers were able to reach the border. The 8th Battalion of East Bengal Regiment was a newly formed battalion with limited power. The 3rd Battalion of East Bengal Regiment also faced casualties.

In this situation, the military headquarters of Bangladesh Forces ordered Major Hafizuddin Ahmed and Major Sahriful Haq Dalim to recruit 600 youths in 1st Battalion of East Bengal Regiment and another collect 500 youths and join 'Z Force' in Tura. Major Hafizuddin Ahmed recruited 600 youths from the youth camps from Khulna-Kushtia border area. The total number of the members in 1st Battalion of East Bengal Regiment was 800 while joining the 'Z Force'. Another 500 members collected by Major Shariful Haq Dalim amplified the strength of 3rd Battalion of East Bengal Regiment. Major Moinul Hossain Chowdhury, who acted as the commanding officer of the 1st Battalion of East Bengal Regiment was asked to format the battalion. The command and the charge to organise the 3rd Battalion of East Bengal Regiment was given to Major Shafayet Zamil and the responsibility of 8th Battalion of East Bengal Regiment was given to Major AJM Aminul Haque.

After a training session of six weeks, "Z Force" turned into a brigade of Bangladesh Forces.

== Organogram of the brigade ==
- Brigade Commander – Lieutenant Colonel Ziaur Rahman
- Brigade Major – Major Oli Ahmed
- D-Q Officer – Captain Sadeque
- Signal Officer – Captain Abdul Halim
- Brigade Medical Officer- Dr. H K M Abdul Hye

=== 1st East Bengal Regiment ===
- Commanding Officer – Major Moinul Hossain Chowdhury (June–August) and Major Mohammad Ziauddin (August–December)
- Second-in-Command – Captain Bazlul Ghani Patwari
- Adjutant – Flight Lieutenant Liaqat Ali Khan
- A Company Commander – Captain Muhammad Mahbubur Rahman
- B Company Commander – Captain Hafizuddin Ahmed
- 1st C Company Commander – Lieutenant Abdul Kaiyum Chowdhury
- 2nd C Company Commander – Lieutenant S. H. B. Noor Chowdhury
- D Company Commander – Captain Salauddin Mumtaz (July–August) and Bazlul Gani Patwary (September–December)
- A Company Officer – Lieutenant Wakar Hasan
- B Company Officer – Lieutenant Anisur Rahman
- Medical Officer – Lieutenant Mujibur Rahman Fakir

=== 3rd East Bengal Regiment ===
- Commanding Officer – Major Shafaat Jamil
- Second-in-Command – Captain Mohsin Uddin Ahmed
- A Company Commander – Captain Anwar Hossain
- B Company Commander – Captain Akbar Hossain
- C Company Commander – Captain Mohsinuddin Ahmed
- D Company Commander – Lieutenant S. I. B. Nurunnabi Khan
- M. F. Company Commander – Lieutenant Manjur Ahmed
- Company Officer – Lieutenant Fazle Hossain
- Medical Officer – Wasiuddin

=== 8th East Bengal Regiment ===
- Commanding Officer – Major A. J. M. Aminul Haque
- Second-in-Command – Captain Kahlequzzaman Chowdhury
- A Company Commander – Captain Amin Ahmed Chowdhury
- B Company Commander – Captain Sadeque Hossain
- C Company Commander – Lieutenant Modasser Hossain Khan
- D Company Commander – Lieutenant Mahbubul Alam
- Company Officer – Lieutenant Imdadul Haq
- Company Officer – Lieutenant Oliul Islam
- Company Officer – Lieutenant Munibur Rahman
- Company Officer – Lieutenant K. M. Abu Baker

=== 2nd Field Artillery Battery ===
- Officer in Charge – Major Khandakar Abdur Rashid
- Officer – Captain Rashed Chowdhury
- Officer – Lieutenant Quazi Sazzad Ali Zahir

== Gallantry award ==
Z force members were the highest among any force who were awarded the gallantry award for their heroism in the liberation war

In bracket, highest rank reached in Bangladesh Army

- Bir Uttom
  - Ziaur Rahman (Lieutenant general)
  - Salah Uddin Momtaz (Captain)
  - Mohammad Ziauddin (Lieutenant colonel)
- Bir Bikrom
  - Oli Ahmed (Colonel)
  - Hafizuddin Ahmed (Major)
  - Shafaat Jamil (Colonel)
  - Moinul Hossain Chowdhury (Major general)
  - Amin Ahmed Chowdhury (Major general)
  - S.H.M.B Noor Chowdhury (Lieutenant colonel), revoked
- Bir Protik
  - Akbar Hossain (Lieutenant colonel)
  - Mohammad Bazlul Gani Patwari (Colonel)
  - Wakar Hasan (Major)
  - Manjur Ahmed
  - Rashed Chowdhury (Lieutenant colonel), revoked

== Major operations ==
=== Kamalpur Border Outpost Attack ===
On 31 July 1971, Mukti Bahini under the command of Major Ziaur Rahman fought against the Pakistani troops stationed in Kamalpur. Since the Kamalpur post was close to the border, it was decided that Mukti Bahini with the support of regular Indian army troops would attempt to capture the post. The Pakistani post was first subjected to artillery bombardment. The Mukti Bahini troops under the cover of supporting fire from Indian army almost reached to the mouth of Pakistani bunkers. However, once the supporting fire was stopped by Indian army, the Mukti Bahini troops were mowed down by machine-gun fire. The attack was called off because of heavy casualties. Captain Salauddin Mumtaz of Mukti Bahini was killed in this battle.

Later from 14 November to 4 December 1971, in order to capture Kamalpur, a second battle of Kamalpur took place. The Kamalpur was subsequently captured on 4 December 1971 by combined strength of Bangladesh and Indian army.

=== Nakshi Border Outpost Attack ===
Nakshi Border Outpost was situated in the Sherpur District, where the Pakistan Army formed a strong position. The border outpost became a target of "Z" Force because of its geographical importance.

Soon Captain Amin Ahmed Chowdhury, the commander of Alpha Company, and Lieutenant Modasser Hossain Khan, the commander of Charlie Company, were sent to defeat the Pakistanis of that camp. The two companies with great speed ran into the area and were able to enter into the fifty yards region. With a great show of courage, they attacked the position of Pakistani Army.

The Pakistanis fled from the camp and took shelter in a forest which was nearby. But soon they attacked the freedom fighters with mortar shell with field mines also interrupting the operation of the 'Z Force' companies.

In this battle, Captain Amin Ahmed got injured from machine gun bullets. Major Aminul Haque saved him, risking his life.

=== Battle at Ghashipur ===
On 10 September, the Delta Company of 1st Battalion of East Bengal Regiment formed a strong defence at the Ghashipur. Ghashipur was a location near the Kamalpur Border Outpost.

Ghashipur was considered as a lifeline of the strong position of Pakistan Army in Kamalpur. Pakistani Army was anxious about their safety in Kamalpur due to the strong position of the 'Z Force' in Ghashipur. To remain safe from the sudden attack of freedom fighters Pakistan Army launched an attack on the Ghashipur Defense of 'Z Force'.

The attempt of cleansing the freedom fighters from Ghashipur went up in smoke. Pakistan Army had to flee at the end of the battle after suffering huge casualties. Lance Nayek Yousuf and Subedar Mozammel of the regiment was martyred in the battle.

=== Other battles ===
The Z Force also conducted some other significant operations including the battles of Bahadurabad, Dewanganj, Tengratila, Chilmari, Roumari, Hazipara, Chotokhal, Gowainghat, Gobindaganj, Shalutikor Airport, Dhalai Tea Garden, Sylhet, Jakiganj, Fultala, Borolekha etc.

== Defence of liberated zone ==
One of the prime objectives of Z Force was to cover the liberated zones in Northern Bangladesh during the Liberation War of Bangladesh. As a part of this operations Z Force liberated many areas and set up defence to save those areas from Pakistan Army from August 1971.

=== Establishment of administration in Roumari ===
Roumari, an area from Kurigram was liberated in late August. After being acquired by the Z Force, Ziaur Rahman directed Lieutenant S. I. B. Nurunnabi Khan of 3rd East Bengal Regiment, to establish an administration on behalf of the Provisional Government of Bangladesh. Shafaat Jamil was asked to set up formidable defence to save the area from further invasion of Pakistan Army.

Lieutenant Nabi after getting the order, formed a committee of eminent citizens of that area to establish an administration and make it properly functional. He formed some offices and other establishments including a hospital in Roumari within 27 August. Ziaur Rahman inaugurated the first ever administration system in a liberated area of independent Bangladesh on 27 August 1971.

NBC Network made a documentary that included the liberated zone of Roumari which was entitled as A country made for disaster.

== See also ==
- S Force (Bangladesh)
- K Force (Bangladesh)
- List of sectors in the Bangladesh Liberation War

== Bibliography ==
- Anthony, Mascarenhas (1987), Bangladesh : A Legacy of Blood, Hodder and Stoughton, ISBN 0-340-39420-X.
- Hasan, Moidul (2010), মুক্তিযুদ্ধের পূর্বাপর কথোপকথন (in Bengali), Prathamā Prakāśana, ISBN 9789848765227.
- Arefin, Shamsul (1995), মুক্তিযুদ্ধের প্রেক্ষাপটে ব্যক্তির অবস্থান (in Bengali), UPL, ISBN 978-984-8942-44-4.
- Murshid, Ghulam (2010), মুক্তিযুদ্ধ ও তারপর (in Bengali), Prathamā Prakāśana, ISBN 9789848765371.
- Hossain Chowdhury, Moinul (2000), এক জেনারেলের নীরব সাক্ষ্য স্বাধীনতার প্রথম দশক (১৯৭১-১৯৮১) (in Bengali), Māolā Brādārsa, ISBN 984-410-175-1.
- Ahmed, Hafizuddin (1997), রক্তেভেজা একাত্তর (in Bengali), Sāhitya Prakāśa, ISBN 984-465-124-7.
