= Moinul Hossain Chowdhury =

Bangladeshi revolutionary and army general

Moinul Hossain Chowdhury BB

Advisor of Industries
- In office 15 July 2001 – 10 October 2001
- Preceded by: Tofail Ahmed
- Succeeded by: Rezaul Karim Mannan

Advisor of Commerce
- In office 15 July 2001 – 10 October 2001
- Preceded by: Abdul Jalil
- Succeeded by: Amir Khasru Mahmud Chowdhury

Advisor of Posts, Telecommunications and Information Technology
- In office 26 July 2001 – 10 October 2001
- Preceded by: Abdur Rauf Chowdhury
- Succeeded by: Aminul Haque

Bangladesh Ambassador to Thailand
- In office 8 August 1989 – 8 October 1993
- Preceded by: Kazi Anwarul Masud
- Succeeded by: Major General Abdul Mannaf

Bangladesh Ambassador to Singapore
- In office 21 July 1986 – 27 July 1989
- Preceded by: Brigadier Feroze Salahuddin
- Succeeded by: Brigadier Gyasuddin A. Chowdury

Bangladesh Ambassador to Indonesia
- In office 28 June 1982 – 14 July 1986
- Preceded by: Shamsul Islam
- Succeeded by: Manzur Murshed

Bangladesh Ambassador to Philippines
- In office 18 January 1982 – 30 July 1982
- Preceded by: Position Established
- Succeeded by: Barrister Harun-ur Rashid

Personal details
- Born: 12 November 1943 Sylhet, Assam, British India
- Died: 10 October 2010 (aged 66) Dhaka, Bangladesh
- Awards: Bir Bikrom

Military service
- Allegiance: Bangladesh; Pakistan (before 1971)
- Branch/service: Bangladesh Army; Pakistan Army
- Years of service: 1964–1998
- Rank: Major General
- Unit: East Bengal Regiment
- Commands: Deputy Commander of S Force; CO of 1st East Bengal Regiment; CO of 2nd East Bengal Regiment; Military Secretary to President; Commander of 46th Independent Infantry Brigade; Commander of Logistics Area; AG of Army Headquarters
- Battles/wars: Indo-Pakistani War of 1965; Bangladesh Liberation War

Moinul Hossain Chowdhury, Bir Bikrom (12 November 1943 – 10 October 2010) was a Bangladesh Army officer who served as the adjutant general of the Bangladesh Army and an advisor of the caretaker government.

== Military career ==
=== Pakistan Army ===
Moinul Hossain Chowdhury joined the Pakistan Army in 1962. He was appointed a battalion sergeant major (BSM) in PMA. He was commissioned with the 30th PMA Long Course on 11 October 1964 in the 2nd East Bengal Regiment. He fought in the 1965 Indo-Pak War. He served as the ADC of the GOC of the 14th Infantry Division and East Pakistan Chief Martial Law Administrator Major General Khadim Hussain Raja. In 1970, he was promoted to the rank of major and was posted to the 2nd East Bengal Regiment.

=== Liberation War of Bangladesh ===
Moinul Hossain Chowdhury was posted to the 2nd East Bengal Regiment in March 1971. At the end of March, he revolted from the Pakistan Army along with the 2nd East Bengal Regiment. He fought in Sector 2 till June. In June, when Z force was formed, he was appointed the commanding officer of the 1st East Bengal Regiment. He served there till August. In September, when S Force was formed, he was appointed the commanding officer of the 2nd East Bengal Regiment. On 16 December, he entered Dhaka with his battalion and established his headquarters at the Dhaka Stadium. On 10 January 1972, Sheikh Mujibur Rahman returned to Bangladesh then he gave him the guard of honour.

=== Bangladesh Army ===
He served as the commanding officer of the 2nd East Bengal Regiment till September 1972. On 27 September 1972, he was appointed military secretary to the president. In October 1972, he was promoted to the rank of lieutenant colonel.

After 3 weeks of his appointment as military secretary to the president, he was transferred to the 46th Independent Infantry Brigade as the brigade commander on 10 October 1972. In 1974, he was promoted to the rank of colonel. In March 1974, he was transferred to army headquarters as the commander of Logistics Area of Dhaka Cantonment.

In June 1975, he went to Yugoslavia as a member of a military delegation. Following his return to Bangladesh, then army chief Major General K M Shafiullah told him to take charge as the adjutant general then colonel (later lt. general) Hussein Muhammad Ershad was sent to India for training. In July 1975, he was injured while playing basketball and was admitted to the Combined Military Hospital. After staying there for 3 weeks, on 12 August, he was discharged. After the assassination of Sheikh Mujibur Rahman, he worked to integrate the National Defence Force into the army. In December 1975, he was appointed the councillor of NSI at the Embassy of Bangladesh in the UK. He served there till November 1977.

He was again appointed adjutant general of the Bangladesh Army in 1977. In 1978, he was promoted to the rank of brigadier. He was appointed to the post of chief advisor of the Muktijoddha Sangsad by President Ziaur Rahman but was replaced by Lt. General Ershad.

He was later promoted to the rank of major general in 1980. He was scheduled to serve as the GOC of the 11th Infantry Division, but President Zia was assassinated a few days before he was supposed to move. When President Ziaur Rahman was assassinated, it was his job to investigate the coup, but he was sidelined by the then army chief, General Hussain Muhammad Ershad. As a result, he did not sign the order of inquiry that he was supposed to; Ershad ended up signing it. Afterwards, he was sidelined as part of Lt. General Ershad's purge of Freedom Fighter officers.

== Post-military career ==
In October 1981, he was sent to the Ministry of Foreign Affairs on deputation. He was appointed ambassador of Bangladesh to the Philippines in 1982. Later, he served as ambassador of Bangladesh to Indonesia, Singapore, Thailand, Australia, Laos, New Zealand, Fiji, and Papua New Guinea. From 1989 to 1993, he served as the permanent representative of Bangladesh in ESCAP. He retired in 1998.

He served as an advisor in the caretaker government of former Chief Justice Latifur Rahman. He served there as the advisor for Industry, Commerce, Post and telecommunication.

== Bibliography ==
He wrote Silent Witness by a General about his time in the Bangladesh Army along with several newspaper articles, both in English and Bangla.

== Death ==
He died on 10 October 2010.
