= East Bengal Regimental Centre =

Infantry training centre of East Bengal Regiment of Bangladesh Army

- Regimental Flag
- Formation: 1948
- Headquarters: Chittagong Cantonment, Bangladesh
- Region served: Bangladesh
- Official language: Bengali
- Commandant: Major General J. M. Emdadul Islam
- Parent organization: ARTDOC

East Bengal Regimental Centre (EBRC) is an infantry training centre of East Bengal Regiment of Bangladesh Army located in Chittagong Cantonment. Major General J. M. Emdadul Islam is the current commandant of the centre and flag officer commanding of the regiment.

== History ==
Following the Partition and independence of Pakistan in 1947, the East Bengal Regiment was formed in Pakistan Army from two companies of the Pioneer Corps of the British Indian Army.The East Bengal Regimental Centre is the training and administrative hub of the East Bengal Regiment .It initially established and officially approved as Training Company at Kurmitola Dhaka in November 1947 and started its training, on 15 February 1948 the Regiment was formally inaugurated and East Bengal Regiment Record Office was also formed. The centre was relocated later to Chittagong Cantonment.The company was subsequently It was expanded to Training Battalion, The East Bengal Regimental Centre.

The East Bengal Regiment and the centre as training company received formal approval in November 1947 from the Transitional Supreme Commanders Headquarters, the Joint Defense Council of Pakistan and India, and the Supreme Commander Field Marshal Claude Auchinleck of the India and Pakistan Army. Soon after the regiment was raised and initially commanded by Major Abdul Waheed Chowdhury, he was appointed as the Officer Commanding of the newly raised unite playing central role in shaping its early training and organization. On 15 February 1948, the first Battalion of The East Bengal Regiment - nicknamed the " Senior Tigers " - was formally inaugurated by Pakistan's Head of State & Government Muhammed Ali Jinnah.

The East Bengal Regiment Centre was simultaneously established on 15 February 1948 as dedicated training depot for new recruits to the regiment.Major Abdul Waheed Chowdhury was first to raise and command the 1st East Bengal Regiment and under his leadership the unite was developed into fully functioning battalion .His work laid the foundation for an Infantry line-age that would later form the backbone of Bangladesh Army.

== The Massacre in 1971 ==
In 1971 the Centre's Commandent was Brigadier General Mahmudur Rahman Majumdar then the most senior ethnic Bengali Officer in East Pakistan.After Pakistani military crackdown Operation Searchlight begun in 25tn March 1971 Majumdar was imprisoned for the duration of the war. Led by Lt Colonel A H Fatami, 20th Beluch of Pk Army attacked the EBRC Centre with Heavy Machine Gun and Tank at night and encircling the EBRC and seized all of there arms and ammunition brutally massacred more than 2000 of the centre's unarmed recruits, Bengali Officer's along with Chief Instructor Lt Colonel M R Choudhury some with there family's were victim of brutal genocide ever caused by Pak Army in 1971, most recruits were unarmed teenagers they were encircled captured and mercilessly killed either by shooting or bayonet charge.One brave EBRC Soldier resisted and killed 6 Pak Soldiers and wounded several, miraculously few survived.

Despite this the East Bengal Regiment Centre and the battalions that had been raised from it went on provide the core manpower for the guerrilla and conventional forces of Bangladesh, forming the nucleolus of Bangladesh Army after the Independence in 1971. The centre has a conference hall.Today the Centre continues to function as the regimental headquarters and the training base of The East Bengal Regiment.The East Bengal Regiment Museum is also located in the centre.
