= Bangladesh School Muscat =

Location
- 18 November Street; Al Ghubrah, Muscat 115; Oman

Information
- Type: Private
- Established: 3 November 1996
- Principal: Flora Launay (acting)
- Grades: Kindergarten to Grade 12
- Gender: Co-educational
- Enrollment: 1950
- Campus type: Urban
- Affiliation: Edexcel London
- Website: bsmedu.com

Bangladesh School Muscat is a school for national and foreign children in Oman. It is the only school that teaches the Bangla language in the country. The institute follows the British Curriculum.

== History ==
The school was established on 3 September 1996 for students of all backgrounds and nationalities but mainly Bangladeshi children under the sponsorship of the Embassy of Bangladesh to the Sultanate of Oman with the approval of the Ministry of Education. Currently, Engr. Md. Ismail Hossain is the chairman of the school.

== Activities ==
- In March 2014, the school celebrated the 43rd National Day anniversary of the independence of Oman.
- Two years later, the school marked the 45th anniversary by organising a cultural programme.
- In February 2014, the school held an Annual Science Fair and Exhibition.

== Principal ==
As of 27 April 2026, Flora Launay is the acting principal of Bangladesh School Muscat.
