= 46th Independent Infantry Brigade =

Bangladeshi military unit

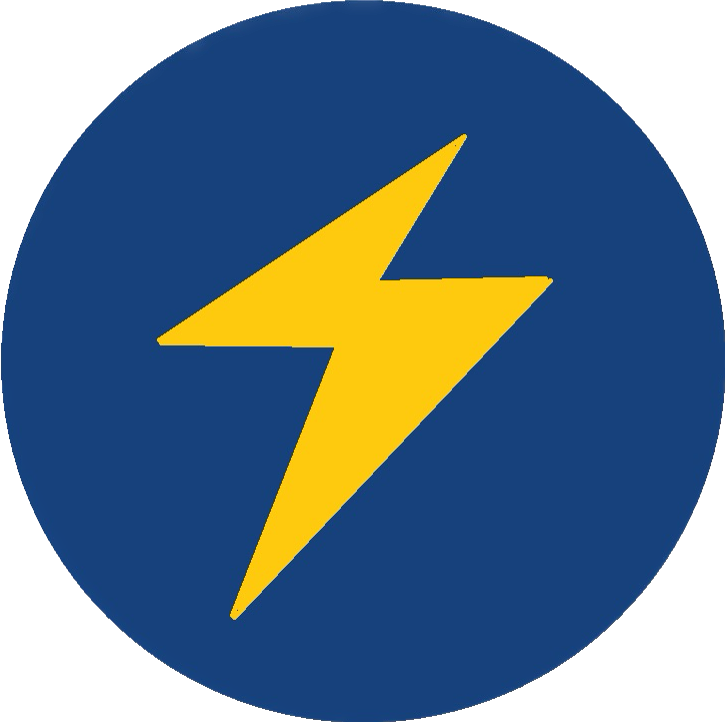
- Insignia of 46th Independent Infantry Brigade
- Active: 6 January 1972 - present
- Country: Bangladesh
- Branch: Bangladesh Army
- Type: Brigade
- Garrison/HQ: Dhaka Cantonment
- Nickname: Dhaka Brigade
- Engagements: 1972–1975 Bangladesh insurgency; First Siege of Dhaka; Second Siege of Dhaka; 1976 Bogra mutiny; 1977 Bangladesh Air Force mutiny; 1982 Bangladeshi coup d'état; Bangladesh Rifles revolt; Operation Thunderbolt; July Revolution

Commanders
- Current commander: Brig Gen Mohammad Humayun Kabir
- Notable commanders: Lt Col K. M. Shafiullah; Col Shafaat Jamil; Col Moinul Hossain Chowdhury; Brig Gen Matiur Rahman; Brig Gen Waker-uz-Zaman

The 46th Independent Infantry Brigade is an independent brigade formation of the Bangladesh Army. It is located in Dhaka Cantonment directly under the command of the Army Headquarters (AHQ). The brigade is also known as the Dhaka Brigade.

== History ==
This brigade was created immediately after the liberation war of Bangladesh, and the first brigade commander was Lieutenant Colonel (later Major General) K. M. Shafiullah.

The 46th Independent Infantry Brigade, under the command of Colonel Shafaat Jamil, supported Major General Khaled Mosharraf's coup on 3 November 1975. Captain Hafiz of the brigade was charged with detaining Major General Ziaur Rahman.

During the 1976 Bogra mutiny, Major General Mir Shawkat Ali used the brigade to pin down the rebellious Bengal Lancer regiments of the 9th division. This forced Khandaker Abdul Rashid to surrender and leave the country.

The brigade, in addition to the 9th Infantry Division, was also used to suppress the 1977 Bangladesh Air Force mutiny.

The government of Bangladesh was criticized for not deploying the brigade to stop the Bangladesh Rifles mutiny in 2009.

The brigade was deployed during the Holey Artisan attack. The operation, Operation Thunderbolt, was led by the commander of the brigade, Mujibur Rahman. Nearly 12 hours after the attack, the operation was declared over by Brigadier Rahman. The operation ended with the rescue of 13 hostages, and 5 terrorists were killed while the 6th one was captured.
