= Chittagong Cantonment =

Bangladeshi military cantonment

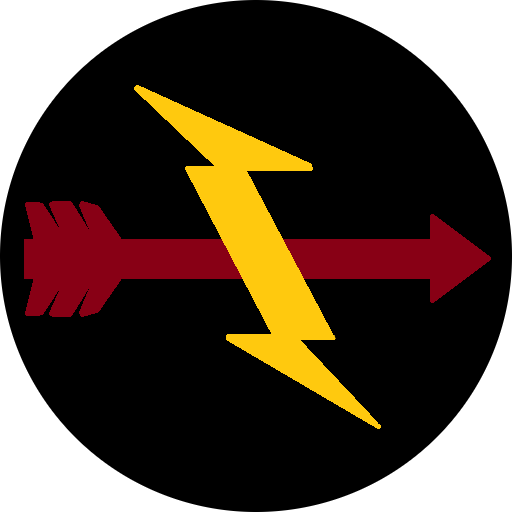
Chittagong Cantonment
- চট্টগ্রাম সেনানিবাস
- Chattogram, Chittagong, Bangladesh

Site information
- Type: Cantonment
- Controlled by: Bangladesh Army

Garrison information
- Current commander: Major General Ferdous Hasan Selim

Chittagong Cantonment is situated near Bayezid Bostami of Chattogram, Bangladesh. It is the headquarters of 24th Infantry Division.

== History ==
Insignia of Chittagong Area Command

An Indian army tank captured by the East Bengal Regiment near Lahore in the Indo-Pakistani War of 1965 is displayed in the cantonment. On 30 May 1981, President Ziaur Rahman was assassinated in Chattogram city by officers based in Chattogram Cantonment. The base commander General Abul Manzur was also accused of involvement in the coup. He himself was killed on 2 June 1981.

== Installation ==
- HQ 24th Infantry Division
  - Area Headquarters, Chattogram
  - Station Headquarters, Chattogram
    - Combined Military Hospital (CMH)
    - Trust Transport Services Office
- HQ 34th Engineers Construction Brigade
- HQ 7th Independent Air Defence Brigade
- East Bengal Regimental Centre

== Educational institutions ==
- Chattogram Cantonment Public College
- Army Medical College, Chattogram
- Chattogram Cantonment Board High School
- Cantonment English School and College, Chattogram
- Bayzid Bostami Cantonment Board High School
- Birshrestha Mohiuddin Jahangir Cantonment Board High school

== See also ==
- Cumilla Cantonment
- Alikadam Cantonment
- Savar Cantonment
