= K. M. Shafiullah =

2nd Chief of Army Staff of Bangladesh Army (1934–2025)

Kazi Mohammed Safiullah BU

Member of Parliament
- In office 14 July 1996 – 13 July 2001
- Preceded by: Abdul Matin Chowdhury
- Succeeded by: Abdul Matin Chowdhury
- Constituency: Narayanganj-1

Bangladesh High Commissioner to United Kingdom
- In office 31 July 1987 – 3 June 1991
- Preceded by: Mir Shawkat Ali
- Succeeded by: M. M. Rezaul Karim

Bangladesh High Commissioner to Canada
- In office August 1981 – September 1986
- Preceded by: M Hossain Ali
- Succeeded by: A. N. M. Nuruzzaman

Bangladesh High Commissioner to Malaysia
- In office 12 January 1976 – 9 July 1981
- Preceded by: Zamiruddin Ahmed
- Succeeded by: Mustafizur Raham

2nd Chief of Army Staff
- In office 7 April 1972 – 25 August 1975
- President: Abu Sayeed Chowdhury; Mohammad Mohammadullah; Sheikh Mujibur Rahman; Khondaker Mostaq Ahmad
- Prime Minister: Sheikh Mujibur Rahman; Muhammad Mansur Ali
- Preceded by: M. A. G. Osmani (as Commander-in-Chief)
- Succeeded by: Ziaur Rahman

Personal details
- Born: 2 September 1934 Rupganj, Bengal Presidency, British India
- Died: 26 January 2025 (aged 90) Combined Military Hospital, Dhaka Division, Bangladesh
- Party: Awami League
- Education: Pakistan Military Academy
- Awards: Bir Uttom

Military service
- Allegiance: Bangladesh; Pakistan (before 1971)
- Branch: Bangladesh Army; Pakistan Army
- Service years: 1955–1975
- Rank: Major General
- Unit: Punjab Regiment; East Bengal Regiment
- Commands: Commander of Sector – III; Commander of S Force; Commander of 46th Independent Infantry Brigade; Chief of Army Staff
- Conflict: Bangladesh Liberation War

Kazi Mohammed Safiullah, BU, psc (Bengali: কাজী মুহাম্মদ সফিউল্লাহ; 2 September 1934 – 26 January 2025) was a Bangladeshi retired two star army officer and diplomat. He served as the 2nd chief of army staff of the Bangladesh Army, and a Jatiya Sangsad member for the Awami League. He gained prominence for leading the S Force, a prominent brigade during the Bangladesh Liberation War that played a pivotal role in the conflict of 1971.

As the second in command of the Second East Bengal Regiment, along with his battalion, Safiullah was the first Bengali officer to stage a rebellion on 19 March 1971 while 57 Bde. Commander-Brig. Jahanzeb Arbab came to visit Joydevpur. During the Bangladesh Liberation War of 1971, he was the second in command of the Second East Bengal Regiment that revolted with six officers on the night of 4 April 1971. He became the sector commander of Sector 3, headquartered in Teliapara, Sylhet. He directly participated in active combat and escaped certain death at least in two such combats. Towards the end of September, he was appointed one of three brigade commanders, leading what was called the "S-force" (after his surname) during the Bangladesh Liberation War in 1971.

Safiullah became chief of army staff in April 1972. After the 15 August 1975 Bangladesh coup d'état, President Khondaker Mostaq Ahmad replaced him with Major General Ziaur Rahman.

== Early life and education ==
Safiullah was born on 2 September 1934 in Rupganj, Narayanganj, then part of the Dacca district of the Bengal Presidency. He belonged to a Bengali family of Muslim Qazis (Islamic magistrates) from Sonargaon. He was the sixth child among the 3 sons and 6 daughters of Qazi Abdul Hamid and Rajjab Banu. He passed his matriculation in 1950 from Murapara High School. Later he studied in Govt. Haraganga College in Munshiganj. While studying in Government Haraganga College, he joined the Pakistan Army.

== Military career ==
Safiullah was commissioned from the 12 PMA Long Course on 18 September 1955. His initial parent unit was in the 16th Punjab Regiment. He also served as an Instructor in the School of Infantry and Tactics. In 1970 he was posted to the 2nd East Bengal Regiment.

== Bangladesh Liberation War ==
Prior to Operation Searchlight, Shafiullah was the 2-in-C of the 2nd East Bengal Regiment, where he and other men of his company revolted and killed four West Pakistani officers and a few West Pakistani soldiers. After this, Shafiullah took all of the equipment and defected with his battalion.

After open hostilities, Shafiullah, at that time, was Sector Commander of Bangladesh Forces Sector 3. His sector was headquartered in Teliapara, Sylhet from where he commanded his troops and took part in active combat during the entire duration of the war. His sector's areas were Dhaka, Mymensingh, Sylhet, and parts of Comilla (present Brahmanbaria district).

Later, three brigades were formed, each identified by the initial of the commander's surname. His formation was fully structured and formalised by the end of September. As of September 1971, command of Sector 3 was assigned to Major A. N. M. Nuruzzaman. Major Shafiullah was among those attending the Pakistan surrender on 16 December 1971 at Race Course in Dhaka.

== Bangladesh Army ==
After the end of the war in December 1971, the Bangladesh government awarded Safiullah the Bir Uttam, the second-highest military award in the country. Forthwith, he was appointed the first brigade commander of the newly established 46th Independent Infantry Brigade.

On 5 April 1972, General Osmani resigned from his post, and Safiullah was appointed the chief of army staff of the Bangladesh Army on 6 April 1972 by the Awami League government under Sheikh Mujibur Rahman and was promoted to the rank of colonel. He was then upgraded to the rank of brigadier within mid-1973, and as of 10 October 1973, his rank was raised to major general.

Safiullah was the chief of staff of the Bangladesh Army during the assassination of then-president Sheikh Mujibur Rahman. During the assassination, he was kept in the dark about the plot, intelligence failed, and he could not save the president. Dismissed from the position on 25 August 1975 by the following Mushtaq government, he retired from the army. He was succeeded by Ziaur Rahman as army chief. Suspecting his intentions based on his loyalty towards Bangabandhu Sheikh Mujibur Rahman, General Safiullah was sent overseas with an ambassadorial post, along with fellow Bangladesh Air Force Chief of Air Staff Air Vice Marshal A. K. Khandker. He was elected as an Awami League member of parliament in 1996.

== After retirement from army and into diplomatic circles ==
Safiullah was appointed the first Bangladeshi high commissioner to Malaysia. Malaysia had recognised the independence of Bangladesh very soon after the liberation war. He thereafter went on to serve as the high commissioner to Canada and South America.

== Life in politics ==
In 1990, Safiullah returned to Bangladesh in retirement from diplomatic service and was reintroduced into the social fabric of national service, by being elected as an MP through the Awami League political party, the party of Sheikh Mujib. He served as an MP for the constituency of Rupganj, the area from which he originated. During his tenure as MP, he was responsible for creating many roads and facilitating the formation of development and job creation in the constituency. Following two terms as an MP, he retired from government.

== Returning to a life as a civilian and freedom fighter ==
Being the most senior army officer in Bangladesh, Safiullah was invited to chair the sector commanders forum in 2014. Through this association, he has led marches and protests well into his late 70s to bring to account war criminals responsible for the atrocities of 1971. He has also led movements against corruption and poverty as an idealist of the revolution.

== Personal life and death ==
Safiullah was married to Saida Akhter. They had three daughters and a son. He died at CMH on 26 January 2025, at the age of 90.

== Books ==
- Bangladesh At War
- 15 August a National Tragedy

== Awards and decorations ==

Bir Uttom (Great Valiant Hero)	Sitara-e-Harb 1965 War (War Star 1965)	Tamgha-e-Jang 1965 War (War Medal 1965)	Tamgha-e-Jamhuria (Republic Commemoration Medal) 1956
