= East Bengal Regiment =

Infantry regiment of the Bangladesh Army

- ইস্ট বেঙ্গল রেজিমেন্ট
- Insignia of the East Bengal Regiment
- Active: 15 February 1948 – present
- Country: Pakistan (1948–1971); Bangladesh (1971–present)
- Branch: Pakistan Army (until 1971); Bangladesh Army
- Type: Infantry
- Size: 47 battalions
- Garrison/HQ: East Bengal Regimental Centre, Chittagong Cantonment
- Nickname: The Tigers
- Mottos: Grace, Strength, Speed
- Colours: (BCC–37)
- March: Notunēr Gān
- Mascot: Bengal tiger
- Anniversaries: 15 February
- Engagements: Indo-Pakistani War of 1965; Bangladesh Liberation War; Chittagong Hill Tracts Conflict; Operation Dabanal; Operation Uttaran; Operation Desert Storm

Insignia
- Regimental Flag

The East Bengal Regiment (Bengali: ইস্ট বেঙ্গল রেজিমেন্ট) is one of the two infantry regiments of the Bangladesh Army, the other being the Bangladesh Infantry Regiment.

== History ==
The East Bengal Regiment was formed on 15 February 1948, following the Partition of India into the Dominion of Pakistan and the Dominion of India in 1947. The core of the unit was made up of soldiers of the Bihar Regiment and the Bengal Pioneer Corps who had opted for Pakistan when partition divided the British Indian Army and the Pakistan Army was born. A shortfall of JCOs was made up from the Punjab Regiment until sufficient Bengali officers became available. Two companies composed of Bengali Muslims were regimented in to the first training regiment in East Pakistan and was named the East Bengal Regiment under Lieutenant Colonel V. J. E. Patterson as Commanding Officer and Major Abdul Waheed Choudhury as Officer Commanding (O.C.). Between 1948 and 1965, a total of eight battalions were raised. The East Bengal Regiment was primarily composed of Bengali men from East Pakistan.

=== 1965 Indo-Pakistan War ===
At the end of the Indo-Pakistan War in 1965, a new battalion called the Lucky Tigers of the 6th East Bengal Regiment was created. The creation of the battalion was not finished until 1966. During the war, soldiers of the East Bengal Regiment defended Lahore, West Pakistan, for which they were awarded several gallantry awards. The East Bengal Regiment was also known for causing heavy casualties on the Indian Army. Most of the gallantry awards were given to the 1st Battalion of the Regiment.

=== History during the Bangladesh War of Independence ===
In March 1971, in response to a crackdown on local populace in East Pakistan, the five battalions of the East Bengal Regiment under the command of Major Ziaur Rahman revolted against the Pakistan Army. Members of the East Bengal Regiment across East Pakistan organized and initiated the Bangladesh War of Independence. The East Bengal Regiment formed the core of the independence struggle forces, which became known as the Bangladesh Forces. The structure and formation of the Bangladesh Forces during the Independence War of 1971 was determined at the Sector Commander's Conference that was held from 11 to 17 July 1971.

Colonel M.A.G. Osmani (promoted to general after independence of Bangladesh) was the Commander-in-Chief of all Bangladesh Forces. Lieutenant Colonel M. A. Rab was appointed as the Chief of Army Staff and Squadron Leader M. Hamidullah Khan, was appointed Bangladesh Military Representative to coordinate guerilla training at the largest training camp of the war effort at Chakulia, Bihar, India. The decision of the formation of three separate brigades were formed with East Bengal battalions. The East Bengal Regiment battalions that participated in the war were as follows:

Z Force, commanded by Major Ziaur Rahman, consisted of 1st, 3rd and 8th East Bengal Regiment. These battalions were formed during May–June 1971 at Teldhala village of Tura, Meghalaya, in 1971 by Major Ziaur Rahman. These three battalions principally constituted the backbone of Bangladesh Forces Sector 11, later commanded for a brief stint (24 days) by Major Abu Taher and subsequently by Squadron Leader M. Hamidullah Khan from 3 November until 14 February. The main two battles fought in Bangladesh Forces Sector 11 was the Kamalpur battle (land attack), led by Major Zia and the Chmarch ilmari Battle amphibious attack (landing raid) led by Squadron Leader M. Hamidullah Khan.

K Force, commanded by Major Khaled Mosharraf was created with 4, 9 and 10 East Bengal.

S Force, under Major K M Shafiullah, was created in October 1971 and consisted of 2 and 11 East Bengal. Further units were raised to replace those that remained stranded in West Pakistan. Following the foundation of Bangladesh, these units formed the core of the new army. However, the 7th Battalion was incorporated as 44th Battalion, Frontier Force Regiment of the Pakistan Army, which led to the raising of the 10th Battalion in 1971.

== Role ==
The East Bengal Regiment is the oldest infantry regiment of the Bangladesh Army. Its role is to engage and defeat an enemy in frontal combat, within a traditional infantry combat scenario. The regiment also aids the civilian government when called on and contributes regularly to Bangladesh's peacekeeping commitments overseas. Bangladesh is among the countries contributing troops to the United Nations.

- UNOCI
  - 10th East Bengal Regiment
  - 13th East Bengal Regiment
- UNMIL
  - 26th East Bengal Regiment
- MONUSCO
  - 44th East Bengal Regiment

== Units ==
This is the list of the present battalions/units in the East Bengal Regiment. Some of the units from East Bengal Regiment were transferred to the Bangladesh Infantry Regiment. (Note: All of the name of the units have been taken from the Official East Bengal Regiment Documented History.)

Unit	Nickname
1 EB	Senior Tigers
2 EB	Junior Tigers
3 EB	Minor Tigers
4 EB	Baby Tigers
5 EB	Victory Tigers
6 EB	Mighty Tigers
7 EB	Lucky Tigers
8 EB	The Pioneers
9 EB	Charging Tigers
10 EB	দুর্ধর্ষ দশ (Durdhorsho Dosh)
11 EB	দুর্নিবার এগারো (Durnibar Egaro)
12 EB	Striking Twelve
13 EB	অবিচলিত তেরো (Obicholito Tero)
14 EB	Ferocious Fourteen
15 EB	দুর্সাহসিক পনেরো (Dusshahosik Ponero)
16 EB	The Majestic Tigers
17 EB	Invisible Seventeen
18 EB	দুর্বার আঠারো (Durbar Atharo)
19 EB	Roaring Nineteen
20 EB	জাগ্রত বিশ (Jagroto Bish)
21 EB	আদর্শ একুশ (Adorsho Ekush)
23 EB	Daring Tigers
24 EB	দুর্জয় চব্বিশ (Durjoy Chobbish)
25 EB	মৃত্যুঞ্জয় পঁচিশ (Mrittunjoi Pochish)
26 EB	Rising Tigers
27 EB	শাশ্বত সাতাশ (Shashoto Satash)
28 EB	Valiant Tigers
29 EB	Heroic Twenty Nine
30 EB	অনির্বাণ ত্রিশ (Onirban Trish)
32 EB	নির্ভীক বত্রিশ (Nirbhik Botrish)
34 EB	Deadly Tigers
36 EB	Dashing Tigers
38 EB	পারদর্শী আটত্রিশ (Parodorshi Attrish)
40 EB	চিরঞ্জীব চল্লিশ (Chironjib Chollish)
56 EB	অটল ছাপ্পান্ন (Otol Chappanno)
57 EB	অদম্য সাতান্ন (Odommo Shatanno)
58 EB	অতন্দ্র আটান্ন (Otondro Atanno)
59 EB	অগ্রগামী উনষাট (Ogrogami Unoshat)
60 EB	অকুতোভয় ষাট (Okutobhoy Shaat)
61 EB	
62 EB	
63 EB	Shining Sixty Three
64 EB	
65 EB	দীপ্তিমান পঁয়ষট্টি (Diptiman Poyshotti)
66 EB	
67 EB	
79 EB (Support Bn)	Elegant Seventy Nine

== See also ==
- Bangladesh Infantry Regiment
