= Hasan Mashhud Chowdhury =

Former (11th) Army chief of Bangladesh

- হাসান মশহুদ চৌধূরী

11th Chief of Army Staff
- In office 16 June 2002 – 15 June 2005
- President: A. Q. M. Badruddoza Chowdhury; Muhammad Jamiruddin Sircar (Acting); Iajuddin Ahmed
- Prime Minister: Khaleda Zia
- Preceded by: M Harun-Ar-Rashid
- Succeeded by: Moeen U Ahmed

2nd Director General of Special Security Force
- In office 19 December 1987 – 13 June 1988
- President: Hussain Muhammad Ershad
- Prime Minister: Mizanur Rahman Chowdhury; Moudud Ahmed
- Preceded by: Jahangir Kabir
- Succeeded by: Kazi Mahmud Hasan

2nd Chairman of Anti-Corruption Commission
- In office 22 February 2007 – 2 April 2009
- Appointed by: Iajuddin Ahmed
- President: Iajuddin Ahmed; Zillur Rahman
- Preceded by: Sultan Hossain Khan
- Succeeded by: Ghulam Rahman

Personal details
- Born: 9 September 1948 (age 78) Sylhet, East Bengal, Pakistan
- Education: Pakistan Military Academy; Defence Services Command and Staff College; United States Army War College; Shippensburg University
- Awards: Shongbidhan Padak; Kuwait Liberation Medal (KSA)

Military service
- Allegiance: Pakistan (before 1974); Bangladesh
- Branch/service: Pakistan Army; Bangladesh Army
- Years of service: 1969–2005
- Rank: Lieutenant General
- Unit: Frontier Force Regiment; East Bengal Regiment
- Commands: Commander of 44th Infantry Brigade; Commandant of School of Infantry and Tactics; Commander of 203rd Infantry Brigade; Director General of Special Security Force; Commandant of DSCSC; GOC of 11th Infantry Division; Chief of General Staff in Army Headquarters; Commandant of NDC; 12th Chief of Army Staff
- Battles/wars: Bangladesh Liberation War (As P.O.W); Chittagong Hill Tracts conflict Gulf War; UNIKOM

Hasan Mashhud Chowdhury (Note: Bengali: হাসান মশহুদ চৌধূরী) (Note: awc, psc) (born 9 September 1948) is a retired three star general of the Bangladesh Army who served as the chief of army staff from 16 June 2002 to 15 June 2005. He is the antecedent director general of the Special Security Force and former ambassador to the United Arab Emirates.

Chowdhury served as one of the advisers during the Iajuddin Ahmed ministry in October 2006, which he resigned from after two months. During Fakhruddin Ahmed's tenure he was appointed as chairman of the Anti-Corruption Commission in February 2007, which he served till the Second Hasina ministry.

== Early life and education ==
Chowdhury was born into a Bengali Muslim family in Sylhet, East Bengal, Dominion of Pakistan, in 1948. His father was a government revenue tax inspector. In spite of his father's position that required frequent transfers, Chowdhury spent most of his childhood in his hometown.

After passing the Matriculation exam from Sylhet Government Pilot High School in 1964, he was admitted to Notre Dame College, Dhaka, and moved to Dhaka. In 1966, he transferred to the Economics Department of the University of Dhaka. One year later, Chowdhury decided to join the army. After being selected by the Inter Services Selection Board, Chowdhury was sent for training to the Pakistan Military Academy at Kakul in West Pakistan in 1967. He was commissioned into the Frontier Force Regiment on 20 April 1969. Chowdhury finished his staff college course at the Bangladesh Defence Services Command and Staff College in 1979 and an advanced strategic course from the United States Army War College in 1991. He also earned his master's degree in public administration from Shippensburg University of Pennsylvania the following year.

== Military career ==
=== Pakistan Army ===
Chowdhury served as company commander of three infantry battalions in Lahore, Karachi, Hyderabad, and Mangla, respectively. He was promoted to captain in 1971 and dispatched for training in Quetta. Chowdhury was detained at Quetta Cantonment during the Bangladesh Liberation War in April 1971. He recalled later, "I was interned in a remote place surrounded by mountains. We were treated as prisoners of war. It was clear to me that we would be used to exchange for West Pakistani prisoners of war in India." He was held in West Pakistan from 1972 to 1974 and described the period as "miserable and wastage of time and working ability."

=== Bangladesh Army ===
Chowdhury was repatriated to the Bangladesh Army in January 1974, and enlisted in the 17th East Bengal Regiment as company commander Delta. He was promoted to major in 1975 and posted as the brigade major of the 46th Independent Infantry Brigade, headquartered at Dhaka. Chowdhury commanded two infantry battalions as lieutenant colonel and was furthermore designated as general staff officer (grade-1) in the 9th Infantry Division, then headquartered at Dhaka and the Bangladesh Military Academy. He also commanded an infantry brigade in Savar as a proxy in the rank of colonel in 1986. Chowdhury was soon promoted to brigadier general in 1987 and was designated as director general of the Special Security Force.

He returned to the army in 1988 and commanded two infantry brigades on Cumilla and Khagrachhari, respectively and was commandant of the School of Infantry and Tactics. Chowdhury was promoted to major general in May 1995 and was designated as commandant of the Defence Services Command and Staff College. After a year he was transferred to the 11th Infantry Division as general officer commanding and area commanding the Bogra area. He replaced Major General Golam Helal Morshed Khan, one of the plotters of 1996 Bangladeshi coup attempt.

In 1997, Chowdhury was posted at army headquarters as the Chief of the General Staff under Lieutenant General Mustafizur Rahman. Chowdhury later served as commandant of the National Defence College from 1 March 2000 for 9 months. In December of that year, he was dispatched to the Ministry of Foreign Affairs as ambassador to the United Arab Emirates.

United Nations peacekeeping missions

Chowdhury served in United Nations peacekeeping during the Gulf War in 1991, where he commanded the first Bangladesh Battalion as part of the Coalition. Chowdhury's unit was stationed for nine months in different places across Saudi Arabia. He described his experience as "tough but professionally pleasing." After the war, Chowdhury served with the United Nations Iraq–Kuwait Observation Mission till June 1991.

==== As chief of army staff ====
On 16 June 2002, he was promoted to lieutenant general and appointed chief of army staff, succeeding Lieutenant General M. Harun-Ar-Rashid. Chowdhury improved the residential areas and the living conditions of military personnel across the country. He was also instrumental in establishing the Baridhara DOHS and ameliorating the Mirpur DOHS. Chowdhury was succeeded by Lieutenant General Moeen U Ahmed as chief of army staff in June 2005 and went on leave per retirement.

== Political career ==
At the start of October 2006, as the confusion about Chief Justice K.M. Hasan started, he expressed his inability. Though he finally agreed to take the duty after the situation had changed. Then Bangladesh Jamaat-e-Islami proposed his name to become an adviser to the interim caretaker government. The Awami League (AL) nominated Sultana Kamal and Sheikh Hasina was consulted on C. M. Shafi Sami by Mukhlesur Rahman Chowdhury, as part of the AL quota. Working with the other advisers, Chowdhury was concerned by what he perceived as a lack of leadership and unwillingness to take the right decision at the right time. When the package proposal of the advisers was accepted by the opposite political parties, he was surprised to see the ignorance of the chief adviser and President Iajuddin Ahmed about it. When Chowdhury learned of its deployment, he and three other advisers immediately resigned, including Akbar Ali Khan, CM Shafi Sami, and Sultana Kamal. Responding to a question about his position, Chowdhury said that he believed the regular agencies of the government were sufficient to maintain law and order. He felt the army could be used for special needs, but not too early in an election cycle. Chowdhury did not assume all responsibility for the political crisis, saying other parties also contributed to it.

On 22 February 2007, Chowdhury was appointed as chairman of the Anti-Corruption Commission. He said he would undertake a sustained battle against corruption, and numerous people were prosecuted for graft. Chowdhury had to resign on 2 April 2009 after the Awami League ascended to rule. Without his knowledge, the Moeen group had filed cases at night; they arrested former prime ministers and leaders of the two major parties, Khaleda Zia and Sheikh Hasina, of the BNP and Awami League, respectively. Awami League MPs, led by Mohiuddin Khan Alamgir, strongly criticised Mashhud in the parliament for appointing majority of the directors of the commission from the armed forces, and he resigned. Bangladesh Nationalist Party MPs, led by Moudud Ahmed, supported the Awami position. Later, in May 2025, a case was filed against Chowdhury and 2 other former ACC chairmen, accusing them of filing false cases against Khaleda Zia and Tarique Rahman.

== Honours ==

| Victory Medal | Constitution Medal | Nirapotta Padak Medal | Dabanal Padak Medal |
| Flood Relief of 1988 Medal | 1991 National Election Medal | 1996 National Election Medal | Silver Jubilee Medal (25 years of liberation) |
| 27 years service | 20 years service | 10 years service | Kuwait Liberation Medal (Saudi_Arabia) |
