= Golam Helal Morshed Khan =

Bangladeshi war hero and military officer

- Born: 27 November 1948 (age 77); Sirajganj District, East Bengal, Pakistan
- Military career
- Allegiance: Bangladesh; Pakistan (Before 1971)
- Branch: Bangladesh Army; Pakistan Army
- Service years: 1969–1997
- Rank: Major general
- Unit: East Bengal Regiment
- Commands: Sub-Commander of Sector – III; Commander of 81st Infantry Brigade; GOC of 11th Infantry Division
- Conflicts: Bangladesh Liberation War; 1996 Bangladeshi coup attempt
- Awards: Bir Bikrom
- Other work: Chairman of Bangladesh Muktijoddha Sangsad

Golam Helal Morshed Khan is a retired major general of the Bangladesh Army and a veteran of the Bangladesh Liberation War. He was awarded Bir Bikrom, the third highest gallantry award, for his actions in the war. He participated in the 1996 Bangladeshi coup d'état attempt. On November 27, 2018, he and 150 retired army officers joined the Awami League.

== Early life ==
Khan was born on 27 November 1948 in Sirajganj District. He joined the Pakistan Army in 1968.

== Career ==
During the Bangladesh Liberation War in 1971, Khan was a lieutenant in the Mukti Bahini and served in Kalkalia of Sector 3. This sector was commanded by Major K. M. Shafiullah, who was later replaced by Major A. N. M. Nuruzzaman. The neighboring camp was commanded by M Harun-Ar-Rashid, who had borrowed weapons from Khan's camp. Khan fought in the battle to liberate Ashuganj in a joint operation between the Indian Army and the Mukti Bahini. He fought in the first and second battles of Belonia.

Khan fought in the Liberation of Mirpur in 1972 as a captain in the 2nd East Bengal Regiment of the Bangladesh Army and commander of Delta Company. After the surrender of the Pakistan Army and the independence of Bangladesh, Mirpur was the last stronghold of pro-Pakistan forces. He commanded the Bangladeshi forces composed of 82 personnel of the Bangladesh Army and 200 personnel of the Bangladesh Police. His commanding officer was Major Moinul Hossain Chowdhury, who sent Second Lieutenant Selim Mohammad Kamrul Hasan, who was killed in action, to support him. The battle saw heavy gunfights between his forces and collaborators of the Pakistan Army. After losing 42 army personnel and 82 police personnel, Khan retreated from Mirpur to an Indian Army base. Mirpur was liberated after reinforcements were sent from different cantonments of Bangladesh.

Major General Khan was the GOC of Bogra Cantonment in 1996. He criticised the government following the February 1996 Bangladeshi general election, which was boycotted by all parties except the ruling Bangladesh Nationalist Party, which won. In response, President Abdur Rahman Biswas sacked him and the deputy chief of the Bangladesh Rifles, Brigadier General Hameedur Rehman. Army chief Lieutenant General Abu Saleh Mohammed Nasim revolted and launched the failed 1996 Bangladeshi coup d'état attempt with the support of troops from Bogra Cantonment. In the June 1996 Bangladeshi general election, the Awami League was elected to power.

Khan is the chairman of Bangladesh Muktijoddha Sangsad.

On November 27, 2018, he and 150 retired army officers joined the Awami League.
