= Mohammad Shafique Ullah =

Bir Protik Awarded Fighter

Colonel (Retd) Mohammad Shafique Ullah Bir Protik
- মোহাম্মদ সফিকউল্লাহ
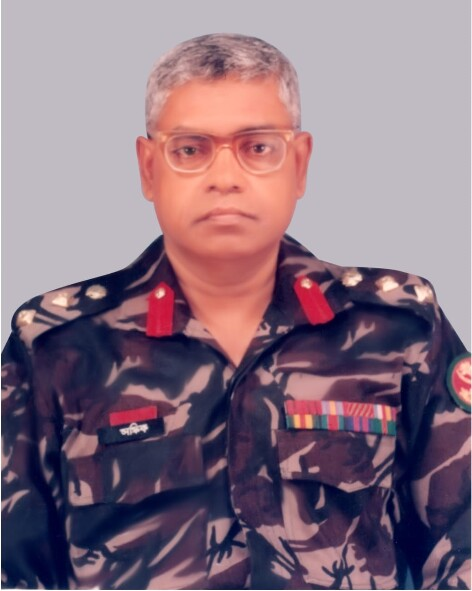
- Born: October 26, 1941; Tipperah, Bengal Province, British India
- Died: March 31, 2008; Dhaka Cantonment, Dhaka, Bangladesh
- Spouse: Nasima Akhter
- Military career
- Allegiance: Bangladesh; Pakistan (before 1971)
- Branch: Bangladesh Army; Pakistan Army
- Service years: 1966-1996
- Rank: Colonel
- Unit: Army Education Corps
- Commands: Company Commander of Sector - VIII; Instructor of Bangladesh Military Academy; GSO-1 of Army Headquarters; Dean of Bangladesh Military Academy
- Conflicts: Bangladesh Liberation War
- Awards: Bir Protik; Joy Padak

Mohammad Shafique Ullah (Bengali: মোহাম্মদ সফিকউল্লাহ) (26 October 1941 – 31 March 2008) was a Bangladeshi fighter and retired colonel of the Bangladesh Army. He was one of only three field commissioned officers of the Bangladesh Armed Forces during the Liberation War of 1971 as officially documented in the Bangladesh Gazette. For his exceptional bravery and service during the war, Shafique Ullah was awarded the Bir Protik, the fourth-highest gallantry award for military personnel in Bangladesh.

== Early life, family and education ==
Mohammad Shafique Ullah was born in Koilain village near the city of Comilla in Bangladesh. His father's name is Maulana Mohammad Mohebullah and mother's name is Rabeya Khatun. His wife's name is Nasima Akhter. Together, they had a son named Mohammad Saif Ullah.

== Role in the war in East Pakistan ==
On 18 September 1971, Baliadanga in the Kalaroa Upazila of Satkhira district was situated near the border of West Bengal state in India. In the month of September, the Pakistani military maintained defensive positions along the India-Bangladesh border in the Satkhira-Jashore area. As part of their plan to weaken the defensive positions of the Pakistani forces and secure the border, a company of fighters led by Mohammad Shafique Ullah crossed the border on 16 September and took positions in Baliadanga. On 17 September, the Pakistani forces launched a counterattack against the fighters. The whole day was spent in combat. The fighters led by Mohammad Shafique Ullah fought against the Pakistani forces. The Pakistanis rained down bullets. Ignoring all of this, Mohammad Shafique Ullah led the counterattack against them with his comrades. On the morning of 18 September, the fighting resumed. Mohammad Shafique Ullah, the leader of the fighters, ensured the safety of their defensive positions in the early morning. That was when the Pakistanis unleashed a hail of bullets. The first bullet landed about 250-300 yards away at Mohammad Shafique Ullah's position. Without succumbing to fear, he encouraged his comrades and gave them instructions. The second bullet landed just 100 yards ahead of him. Within a minute, the third bullet landed right beside him. Before understanding anything, he was knocked down by the powerful impact of the bullet. Fragments of the splintered bullet lodged into various parts of his body. His entire body was soaked in blood. Shafique Ullah did not fear, nor did he give up. Someone quickly arrived and bandaged his wounds. he continued to give instructions to his comrades. However, after a while, he lost consciousness.

== Military career ==
In 1971, He joined the Bangladesh Army as a lieutenant on the battlefield. He served as a regular officer in the Army Education Corps (AEC) from 1972 to 1974. In 1975, he was appointed as the Chief Instructor of Army School of Education's Administration in Saidpur, where he served as a captain.

Throughout his career, Colonel Ullah was promoted to major in 1997 and served as a lieutenant colonel from 1980 to 1982. In 1985, he was assigned as a Grade-1 (Cantonment) staff officer at the Army Headquarter, and in 1988, he served as an Instructor Class-A at the Bangladesh Military Academy.

In this capacity, he worked as the Director of Studies in the Bangladesh Military Academy.

After more than 25 years of service to his country, He retired from the army in 1996. However, his contributions and achievements continue to inspire and motivate future generations of military officers.

== Published works ==
Colonel Ullah was a writer who published several books on the Liberation War of Bangladesh. His most notable works include:

1. Muktijuddhe 8 Number Sector
2. Ekattorer Ranagon Gerila Juddho o Hemayet Bahini
3. Muktijuddhe Chottogram
4. Muktijuddha Noukamandow
5. Muktijuddhe Banglar Nari

== Honors and awards ==
Colonel (retd) Md Shafique Ullah was awarded the Bir Protik, one of the highest military honors in Bangladesh for his bravery and courage in the Liberation War of Bangladesh. He received commission and joined the Bangladesh Army after the war and worked in the Bangladesh Military Academy, in the 24th Infantry Division of the Bangladesh army and in the Bangladesh Army School of Education and Administration. He retired from the Bangladesh Army in 1996 as a colonel.

== Death and legacy ==
Colonel (retd) Md Shafique Ullah died on March 31, 2008 in Dhaka Cantonment at the age of 66. He was a highly respected figure in Bangladesh for his contributions to the country's liberation war and his service in the army. a road in Uttara Sector-4 in Dhaka was renamed after him in October 2008.

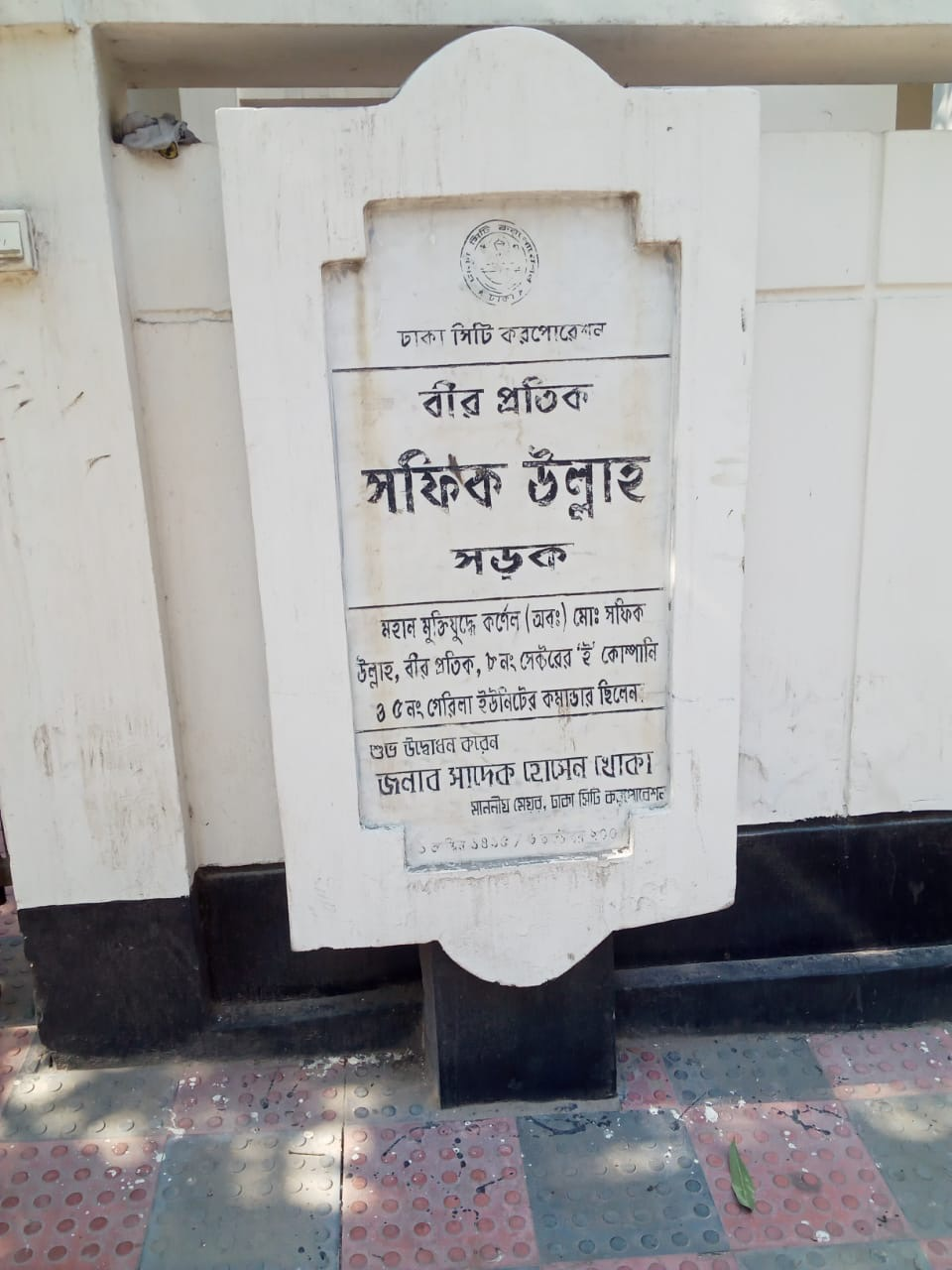
Bir Protik Shafique Ullah Road DCC

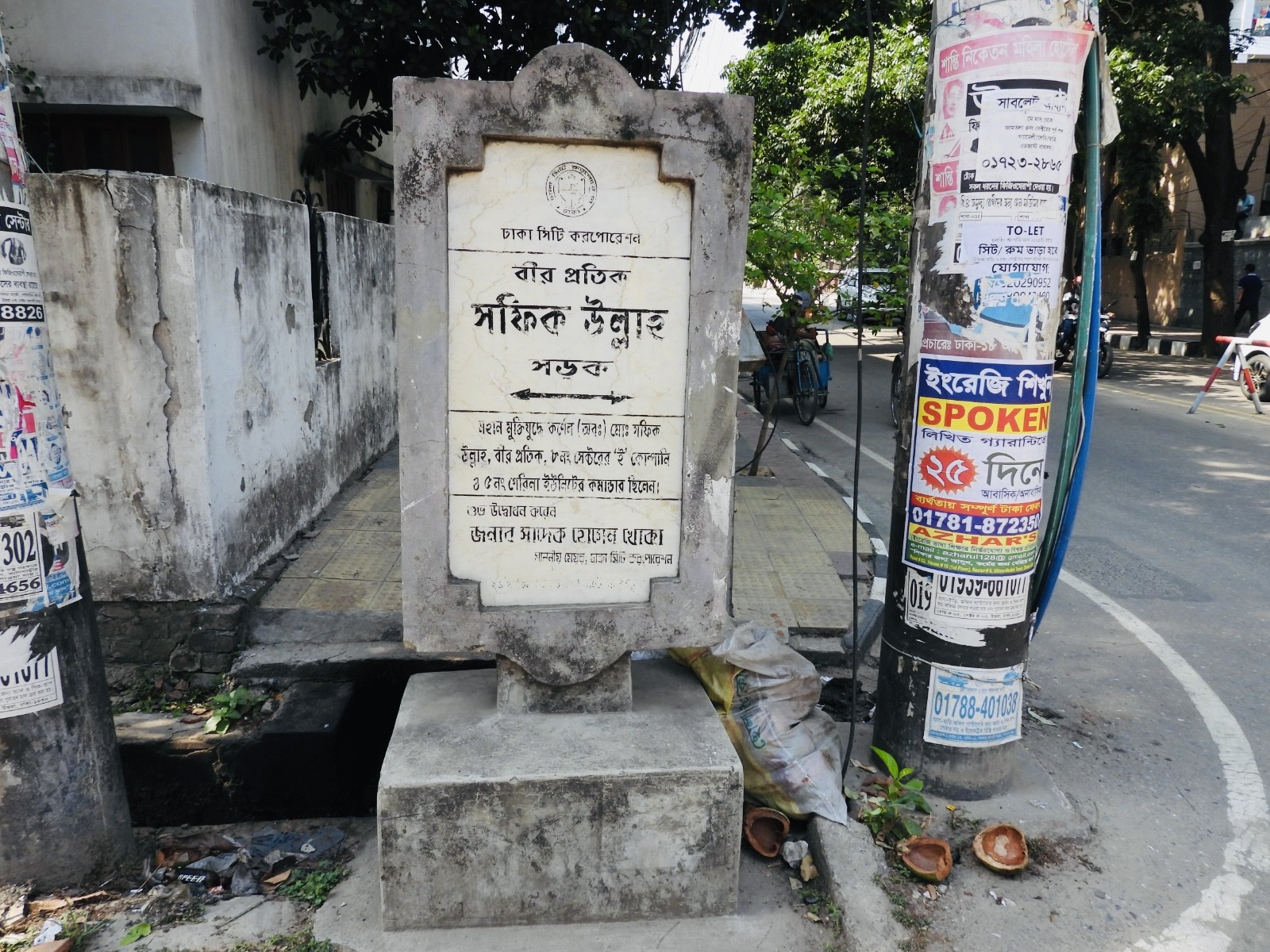
Bir Protik Shafique Ullah Road DCC

There is also another road from Madhaiva to Rahimanagar named after Shafique Ullah.

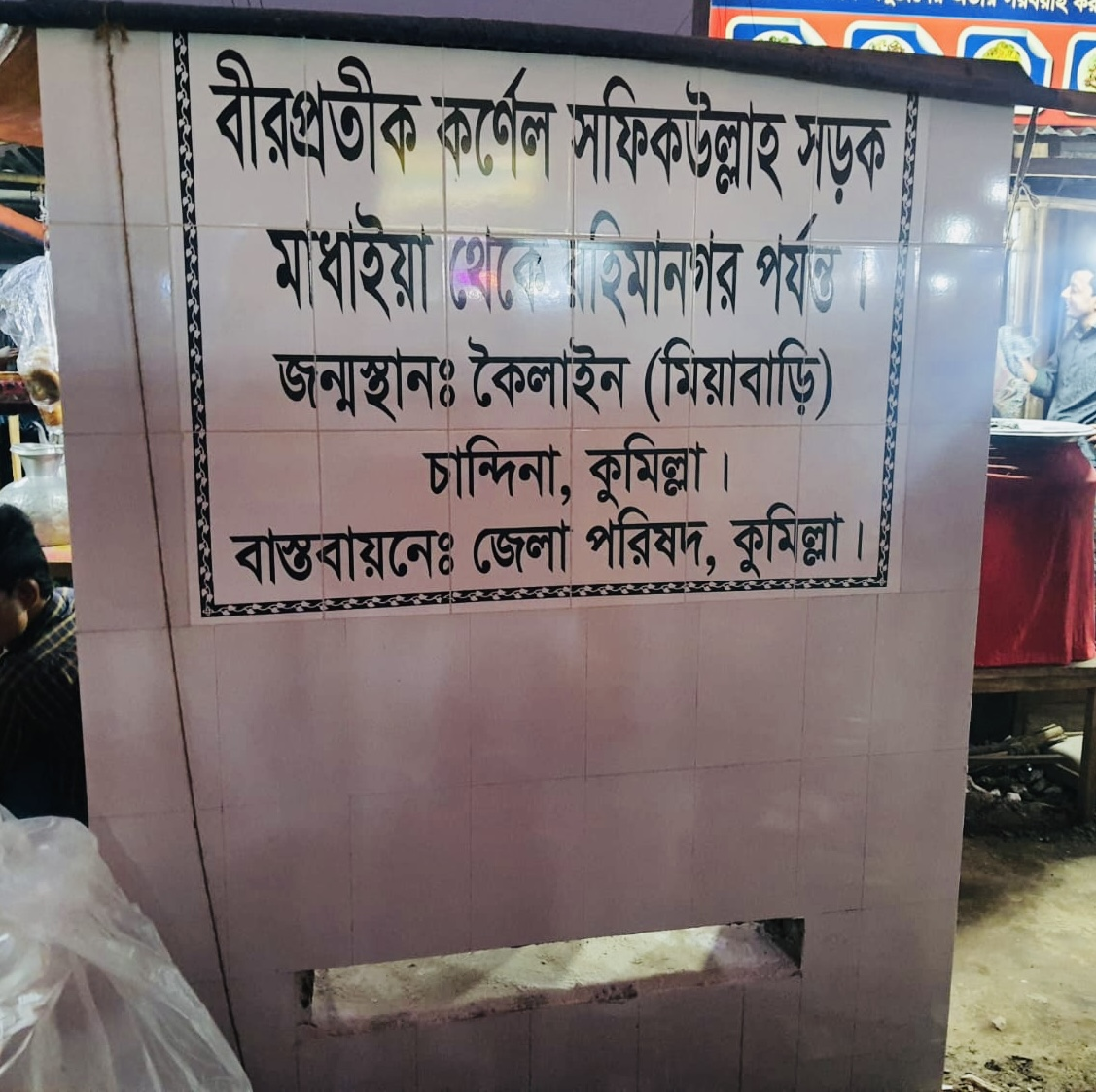
Bir Protik Colonel Shafique Ullah Road

To honor his enduring legacy, the International University of Business Agriculture and Technology (IUBAT) established the Bir Pratik Shafiqullah Scholarship.
