= Mohammed Nasim (disambiguation) =

Mohammed Nasim (1948–2020) was a Bangladeshi politician and a Minister of Home, Minister of Industry, and Minister of Post and Telecommunications.

Mohammed Nasim may also refer to:

- Abu Saleh Mohammad Nasim (born 1946), former Chief of Staff of Bangladesh Army.
- Mohammad Nasim (Guantanamo captive 453), believed to have been born in Shahidan, Afghanistan in 1973.
- Mohammed Nasim (Guantanamo detainee 849), believed to have been born in Megan, Afghanistan in 1980.
- Mohammad Nasim (Guantanamo captive 958), believed to have been born in Pai Warzai, Afghanistan in 1962.
