= 11th Infantry Division (Bangladesh) =

Division of Bangladesh army

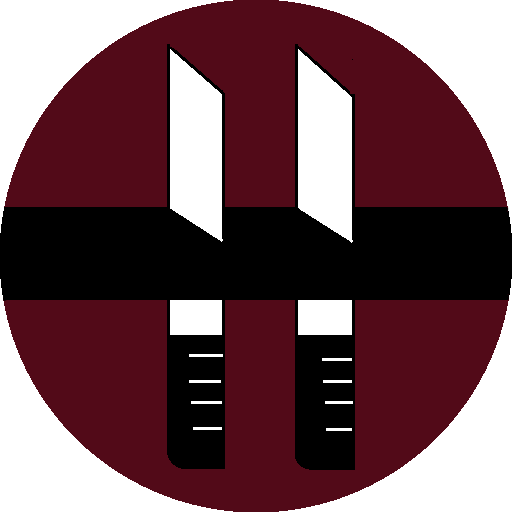
- Insignia of 11th Infantry Division
- Active: 29 March 1976 - present
- Country: Bangladesh
- Branch: Bangladesh Army
- Type: Infantry
- Size: Division
- Garrison/HQ: Bogra Cantonment
- Mottos: Capable and Cohesive

Commanders
- Current commander: Major General Towhidul Ahmed
- Notable commanders: Major General Hasan Mashud; Major General Nazmul Hasan; Major General Mahfuzur Rahman

The 11th Infantry Division (Bengali: ১১ পদাতিক ডিভিশন) is a formation of the Bangladesh Army based in Bogra Cantonment.

== History ==
11th Infantry Division was inaugurated on 29 March 1976 by then chief of army staff Lieutenant General Ziaur Rahman and appointed Major General Abu Zafar Chowdhury as first general officer commanding. It is the second infantry division of Bangladesh Army. Initially headquartered at Jahangirabad Cantonment, the division was composed of 26th Infantry Brigade, 111th Infantry Brigade and 11th Artillery Brigade. The headquarters shifted to Bogra Cantonment on 1978 under Major General Amzad Ahmed Chowdhury who also established the Bogra Cantonment Public School and College. The 93rd Armoured Brigade was initially installed on 14 January 1976 at Jahangirabad cantonment as an independent brigade formation before its assimilation to the 11th Infantry Division. It is the first mechanized brigade of Bangladesh army with units composed of 4th Horse Regiment, 4th East Bengal Regiment and 14th East Bengal Regiment. In February 1996, President of Bangladesh Abdur Rahman Biswas dismissed the general officer commanding the 11th Infantry Division G.H. Murshed Khan for insubordination and Brigadier General Hameedur Rehman of Bangladesh Rifles. Chief of Staff of Bangladesh Army, Lieutenant General Abu Saleh Mohammed Nasim, revolted against the order leading to the 1996 Bangladeshi coup d'état attempt. Troops from the 11th Infantry Division tried to march to Dhaka but failed due to Savar Cantonment, which remained loyal to the president, blocking the Jamuna River crossing.

The 11 Infantry Division organized a cultural program with ATN Bangla in February 2014.

== Former commanders ==
- Major General Sadiqur Rahman Chowdhury
- Major General G.H. Murshed Khan
- Major General Muhammad Zia-Ur-Rahman
- Major General Md Saiful Alam
- Major General Md Moshfequr Rahman
- Major General A K M Nazmul Hasan

== Formation ==
Under the division, there are two infantry brigade, one artillery brigade, one armoured brigade and two signal battalion. Additionally, the division has units from army signal corps, ordnance corps and corps of military police.

Combat Arms

- Infantry
  - 26th Infantry Brigade
  - 111th Infantry Brigade
- Artillery
  - 11th Artillery Brigade
- Cavalry
  - 93rd Armoured Brigade
