= Ouderland =

Ouderland is a Dutch surname. Notable people with the surname include:

- Piet Ouderland (1933–2017), Dutch footballer and basketball player
- William A. S. Ouderland (1917–2001), Dutch Australian military commando
