= Mustafizur Rahman (general) =

Former (9th) Army chief of Bangladesh

Mustafizur Rahman BB
- মুস্তাফিজুর রহমান
- Official portrait

9th Chief of Army Staff
- In office 24 December 1997 – 23 December 2000
- President: Shahabuddin Ahmed
- Prime Minister: Sheikh Hasina
- Preceded by: Muhammad Mahbubur Rahman
- Succeeded by: M Harun-Ar-Rashid

Personal details
- Born: 20 January 1941 Rangpur, Bengal, British India
- Died: 3 August 2008 (aged 67) Dhaka, Bangladesh
- Relations: Waker-uz-Zaman (Son-in-law); Sheikh Hasina (niece)
- Awards: Bir Bikrom

Military service
- Allegiance: Pakistan (before 1971); Bangladesh
- Branch/service: Pakistan Army; Bangladesh Army
- Years of service: 1966–2000
- Rank: General
- Unit: Corps of Engineers
- Commands: Commander of 101st Infantry Brigade; MGO of Army Headquarters; GOC of 55th Infantry Division; ENC of Army Headquarters; Director General of National Security Intelligence; 9th Chief of Army Staff
- Battles/wars: Indo-Pakistan war of 1965; Bangladesh Liberation War

Mustafizur Rahman (20 January 1941 – 3 August 2008) was a Bangladeshi four star general who served as the chief of army staff from December 1997 until 23 December 2000.

== Early life and education ==
Rahman was born on 20 January 1941 in Rangpur of Bengal Presidency, British India (now in Rangpur Division, Bangladesh), to Muhammad Abdus Sattar, a clerk at Rangpur Town Hall, and Zarina Khatun.

Rahman obtained three bachelor's degrees: in science and applied science in 1958 and 1960 from Carmichael College and a Bachelor of Engineering at the East Pakistan University of Engineering and Technology in 1965. Rahman enlisted voluntarily in the Pakistan Military Academy in Kakul on the eve of the Indo-Pakistani war of 1965 through the Pakistan emergency war cadre in the Inter Services Selection Board and was commissioned into the army in 1966 with the Corps of Engineers. He was one of the trailblazing graduates of the Bangladesh Defence Services Command and Staff College in 1979.

== Military career ==
Rahman commanded a riverine engineers company at East Pakistan in the rank of lieutenant and was promoted to captain in December 1970. During Operation Searchlight, Rahman was posted as assistant garrison engineer staff at Comilla Cantonment and was one of the Bengali officers who revolted against the Pakistan army. He enlisted in the newly formed Bangladesh army on 26 March 1971.

=== Bangladesh Liberation War ===
During the Liberation War, Rahman was posted as company commander of Bravo Company of Sector VIII, which was stationed near Darshana. As sub-commander of the Mukti Bahini, most of Rahman's company was composed of partisans who were involved in commando and guerrilla warfare. He was injured on 13 November 1971, a month before the independence of Bangladesh. He was awarded the Bir Bikrom, the third-highest gallantry award of Bangladesh.

=== Post war ===
Rahman was soon promoted to the rank of major and was posted as brigade major of the 55th Infantry Brigade in 1972. He was soon upgraded to the rank of lieutenant colonel in 1973 and was the chief engineer of Dhaka and Bogra Cantonment. Rahman furthermore instructed at the Engineers school at Qadirabad Cantonment and graduated from the Royal School of Military Engineering in 1975. He was one of the pioneer officers of the 66th Infantry Division, commanding an engineers battalion and later serving as colonel administrative at the rank of colonel in 1980. At army headquarters, Rahman served as director of the engineers branch in 1981. He was promoted to brigadier general in 1982 and was sent to Turkey as military attaché. He returned to the army in 1986 and commanded an infantry brigade at Comilla Cantonment. Soon afterm in 1992 he was promoted to major general and returned to army headquarters as master general of ordnance. He was later appointed as general officer commanding of the 55th infantry division and area commander, Jessore area. Rahman returned one last time in the rank of major general to army headquarters and served as the engineer-in-chief in 1996. In December of the same year, he was designated as the director general of National Security Intelligence.

=== As chief of army staff ===
In December 1997, Rahman was promoted to the rank of lieutenant general and appointed as the chief of army staff. He was the army chief under the first Hasina ministry. Rahman was the first army chief of Bangladesh to be given the honour of reviewing the passing-out parade of the IMA, Dehradun. Rahman was an instrumental figure in orchestrating the Military Institute of Science and Technology and the Armed Forces Medical College. Rahman also took the initiative to launch Trust Bank, a financial protection project initiated for the defence personnel of Bangladesh. Rahman was promoted to brevet general on 23 December 2000 and went on leave per retirement the next day. He was succeeded by Lieutenant General M. Harun-Ar-Rashid as chief of army staff. The promotion was later cancelled in 2004, but the High Court declared the action illegal and restored his rank. On the situation, Rahman stated,

Old soldiers never die. By stripping me of the rank, an attempt was made to make the army controversial. But it was not right, the High Court verdict proved the justification of elevating me to the rank.

== Personal life ==
Rahman's wife was the maternal cousin of the first president of Bangladesh, Sheikh Mujibur Rahman. Her niece, Sheikh Hasina, was the longest-serving prime minister of the country. The couple had three daughters. Rahman's eldest daughter, Sarahnaz Kamalika Rahman, is the spouse of the 18th chief of army staff, General Waker-Uz-Zaman. His youngest daughter, Lt. Col. Sofia Zerin Tamanna Rahman Liza, is an army officer serving under the signals regiment. Mustafizur Rahman was one of the accused in a corruption case regarding the procurement of MiG-29s for the Bangladesh Air Force along with other government officials of the first Hasina ministry.

== Death ==
Rahman was diagnosed with pancreatic cancer in 2006 and passed away on 3 August 2008. He was given an Islamic funeral and buried at the Banani military graveyard with full military honours.
