= Ayez Uddin Ahmed =

Bangladeshi fighter (died 2019)

- Died: 21 October 2019
- Military career
- Allegiance: Pakistan (Before 1971); Bangladesh
- Branch: Bangladesh Rifles
- Service years: 1951 - 1984
- Rank: Naib Subedar
- Units: Sector - I 4th Rifles Battalion
- Conflicts: Bangladesh Liberation War
- Awards: Bir Protik

Ayez Uddin Ahmed was a Bangladeshi fighter. He was awarded Bir Protik for his contribution to the Liberation War of Bangladesh.

== Career ==
Ahmed joined the East Pakistan Rifles in 1951. In 1971, he was appointed in Halisahar, Chittagong. After the declaration of independence of Bangladesh, he decided to take part in the Liberation War of Bangladesh. He countered the attack from Pakistani warships with a 3-inch mortar on 26 March 1971.

After the fall of Karerhat, freedom fighters changed their place from the south part of Shuvopur Bridge to the north part of Shuvopur Bridge. Then they decided to attack again. He was injured in a battle against Pakistanis in Shuvopur on 12 May 1971.

Ahmed went to India after his injury for medical treatment. He joined the battlefield in September. Then he took part in the battle of Utma BOP and other places.

== Achievements and honours ==
Ahmed was awarded Bir Protik for his contribution to the Liberation War of Bangladesh. He retired from his job in 1984.

== Death ==
Ahmed died on 21 October 2019.
