= Rafiqul Islam (Bir Bikrom) =

- Died: 1971
- Citizenship: Pakistan (before 1971); Bangladesh
- Known for: Bir Bikrom

Shaheed Rafiqul Islam (died 1971) was a freedom fighter in the Bangladesh Liberation War. For his bravery in the war, the Government of Bangladesh awarded him the title of Bir Bikrom.

== Early life and education ==
Rafiqul Islam was born in Char Khalifa village of Daulatkhan Upazila in Bhola District. His father's name was Sekendar Ali, and his mother's name was Masuma Khatun. His wife's name was Momtaz Begum.

== Career ==
Rafiqul Islam served in the Pakistan Army. In 1971, he was stationed in the 2nd East Bengal Regiment based in Joydebpur. With the onset of the Liberation War, he joined the resistance. After the initial resistance battles, he fought under the Panchabati sub-sector of Sector 3. Later, he joined the newly formed 11 East Bengal Regiment under the S-Force.

== Role in the Liberation War ==
In the final phase of the war, between 12 and 14 December, after the fall of Akhaura, a group of freedom fighters advanced toward Chandura in Sarail Upazila, Brahmanbaria District. The group comprised regular forces of the S-Force. The 'A' team was led by A. S. M. Nasim (Bir Bikrom), and Rafiqul Islam was in the 'C' (Charlie) team, led by Md. Nazrul Islam Bhuiyan (Bir Protik). The Charlie team was tasked with the strategic capture of the Shahbazpur Bridge. At the rear was the 'D' (Delta) team, which included K. M. Shafiullah (Bir Uttom) and the battalion commander.

Rafiqul Islam and his team advanced through Dharmonagar, Harashpur, and Paikpara. While teams A and D were some distance apart, a group of Pakistani soldiers appeared near Islampur, close to Chandura. A battle ensued. Rafiqul Islam's team was in the forward position. As the battle intensified, one platoon took refuge across the nearby Titas River, leaving another platoon isolated. Rafiqul Islam was among those who remained. He and a few comrades courageously resisted the Pakistani forces. Their action saved K. M. Shafiullah's life, but Rafiqul Islam was shot and martyred during the battle.

Two freedom fighters, including Rafiqul Islam, were martyred that day, and eleven others, including A. S. M. Nasim, were injured. Twenty-five Pakistani soldiers were killed, and fourteen were captured. The two martyrs were buried in Chandura, and their graves remain preserved.

== Awards and honors ==
- Bir Bikrom
