= Nazmul Huq =

- Born: 11 August 1938; Lohagara, Bengal, British India
- Died: 27 September 1971 (aged 33); Malda, West Bengal, India
- Military career
- Allegiance: Bangladesh; Pakistan (Before 1971)
- Branch: Pakistan Army; Bangladesh Army
- Service years: 1962-1971
- Rank: Major
- Unit: Regiment of Artillery
- Commands: Commander of Sector – VII
- Conflicts: Bangladesh Liberation War

Major Nazmul Huq (Bengali: নাজমুল হক; 11 August 1938 — 27 September 1971) was the first sector commander of the 7th sector in the Bangladesh Liberation War. He is also called "The Lost Sector Commander" of Bangladesh Liberation War.

== Life ==
Huq was born in Amirabad village under Lohagara Upazila in Chittagong District to Advocate Hafej Ahmed and Joynab Begum. He passed his matriculation from Peshowara school of Comilla and H.S.C from Jagannath College, Dhaka. He joined the Pakistan army when he was a second-year student of Ahsanullah Engineering University (BUET). He was commissioned with the 26th PMA Long Course in 43 Light Anti Aircraft Regiment on October 14, 1962.

== Bangladesh Liberation War ==
Tomb of Captain Mohiuddin Jahangir and Major Nazmul Huq

Huq was a very good organizer. In his sector, he directed the guerrilla warfare as well as trained the independence militia who lacked formal training on military operations. His coverage area was Rajshahi, Pabna, Bogra and part of Dinajpur district. Tarangapur was his headquarters. About fifteen thousand freedom fighters fought in this sector. Bir Shrestho Captain Mohiuddin Jahangir fought under his command.

== Death ==
Huq died in a road accident on 27 September 1971 while returning from Shiliguri Cantonment in Malda, West Bengal, India. His body was later brought to liberated Bangladesh, where he was buried near the Shona Masjid premises in Chapainawabganj District, Bangladesh.
