= Shawkat Ali (disambiguation) =

Shawkat Ali (1918–1975) was a politician and leader of the Language Movement in Bangladesh.

Shawkat Ali, Shaukat Ali, and Shawqat Ali may also refer to:

- Shaukat Ali (field hockey) (1897-1960), Indian field hockey player
- Shawkat Ali (novelist) (1936–2018), Bangladeshi novelist
- Shawkat Ali (politician) (1937–2020), politician and deputy speaker of Bangladesh
- Shawkat Ali (officer) (c. 1952–2020), fighter in the Bangladesh Liberation War awarded the Bir Protik
- Shaukat Ali (singer) (1944–2021), Pakistani folk singer
- Shaukat Ali (politician) (1873–1939), Indian Muslim nationalist
- Nabeel Shaukat Ali (born 1989), Pakistani singer
- Shokat Ali (politician) (born 1976), Pakistani politician
- Shokat Ali (snooker player)
- Md. Shawkat Ali, Bangladeshi politician

== People with the names ==
- Shawkat Ali Emon (born 1971), Bangladeshi music composer
- Shawkat Ali Khan (1926–2006), Bangladeshi politician
- Shaukat Ali Yousafzai (born 1963), Pakistani politician

== See also ==
- Alia Shawkat (born 1989), American actress
- Shawkat
