= Imamuzzaman Chowdhury =

Bangladeshi army general

Imamuzzaman Chowdhury BB
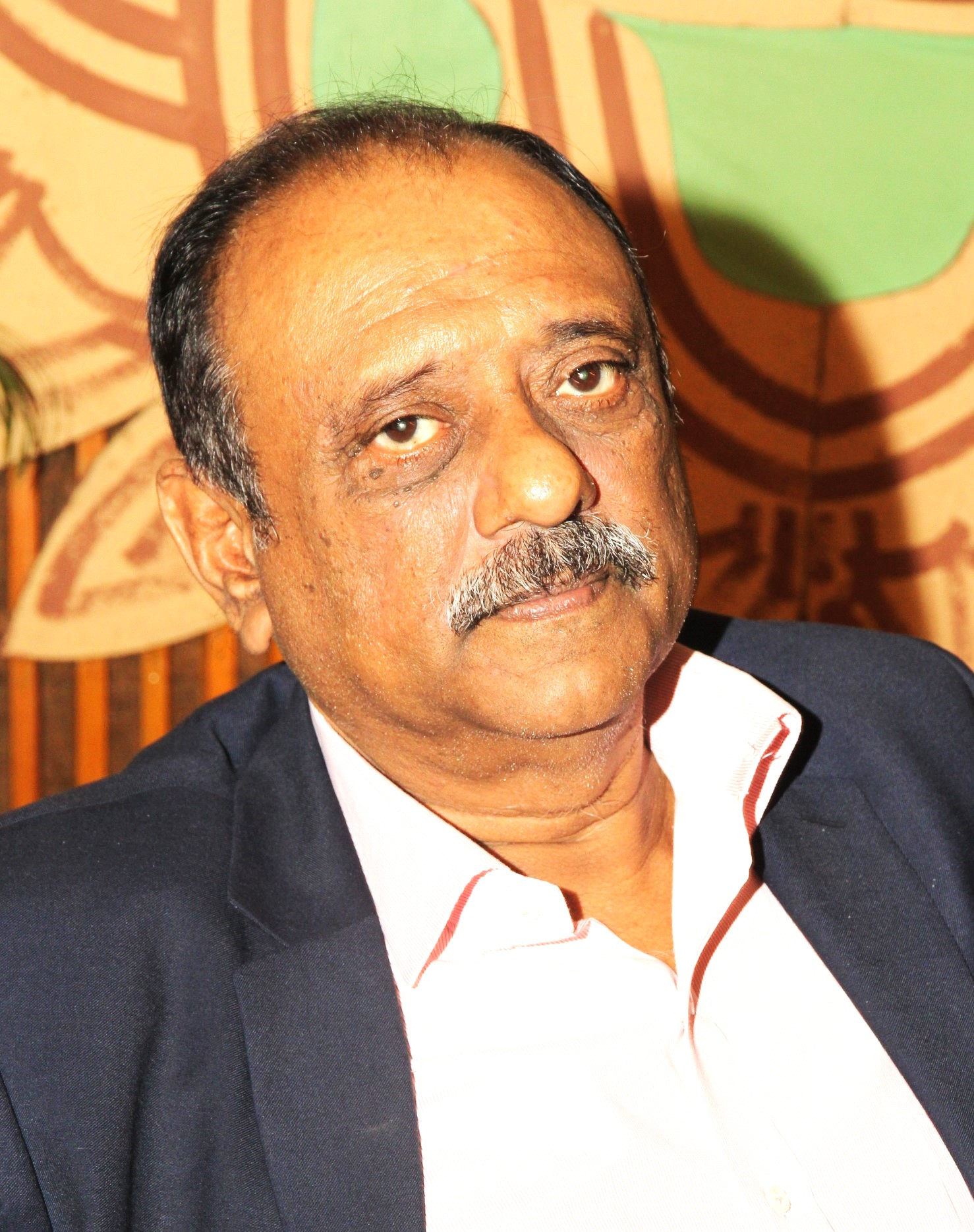
- Imamuzzaman Chowdhury

Principal Staff Officer of Armed Forces Division
- In office 18 December 1992 – 11 February 1996
- President: Shahabuddin Ahmed (acting); Abdur Rahman Biswas
- Prime Minister: Khaleda Zia; Muhammad Habibur Rahman (acting); Sheikh Hasina
- Preceded by: Abul Hasnat Abdullah
- Succeeded by: Abdus Salam

Personal details
- Born: 24 March 1950 (age 76) Sylhet, East Bengal, Pakistan
- Awards: Bir Bikrom

Military service
- Allegiance: Bangladesh; Pakistan (before 1971)
- Branch/service: Bangladesh Army; Pakistan Army
- Years of service: 1970–2000
- Rank: Major General
- Unit: Regiment of Artillery
- Commands: Director General of Directorate General of Defence Purchase; GOC of 9th Infantry Division; Principal Staff Officer of Armed Forces Division; Station Commander, Rangpur; Sub-Commander of Sector – II
- Battles/wars: Bangladesh Liberation War

Imamuzzaman Chowdhury BB, psc (born 24 March 1950) is a retired two star officer of the Bangladesh Army, who is most well known for helping stop the 1996 Bangladesh coup d'état attempt.

== Early life and education ==
Chowdhury was born on 24 March 1950 in Sylhet District. He passed SSC and HSC from Faujdarhat Cadet College in 1967 and 1969, respectively. Later he was admitted to Dhaka University. While studying there, he joined the Pakistan Army in January 1970.

== Career ==
Chowdhury joined the 24th War Course of Pakistan Military Academy in January 1970. He was commissioned in the 53 Field Artillery Regiment on 5 September 1970. He fought in the Bangladesh Liberation War as a lieutenant. He was awarded Bir Bikrom for his role in the war.

Chowdhury was promoted to the rank of major general in 1995. Under the first Khaleda Zia government, he served as the director general of DGFI. In 1996, he was appointed GOC of the 9th Infantry Division in Savar. This allowed him to play a crucial role in thwarting Lt. General ASM Nasim's coup, as he used his soldiers to stop soldiers loyal to Nasim from coming to the capital.

He served as the principal staff officer to the prime minister of Bangladesh. He retired from the Bangladesh Army on 5 September 2000.

Chowdhury was appointed the chairman of Bangladesh Chemical Industries Corporation, a state-owned enterprise, on 22 October 2003 on a three-year contract. He served as chairman till November 2006, when the government dismissed him from service.
