= Mohammad Ashraf Ali Khan (soldier) =

Naik Subedar Mohammad Ashraf Ali Khan Bir Bikrom
- Born: Faridpur District, Bengal Presidency, British India
- Died: December 1971; Comilla District, East Pakistan, Pakistan
- Military career
- Allegiance: Bangladesh
- Branch: Bangladesh Army
- Service years: 1956–1971
- Rank: Naik Subedar
- Unit: 2nd East Bengal Regiment
- Conflicts: Bangladesh Liberation War
- Awards: Bir Bikrom

Mohammad Ashraf Ali Khan (died 3 December 1971) was a Bangladeshi military personnel who served as a Naik Subedar in the 2nd East Bengal Regiment during the Bangladesh Liberation War. He was posthumously awarded Bir Bikrom for his actions during the conflict. Bir Bikrom is the second-highest gallantry award, and he is one of 175 people to receive the award.

== Early life ==
Khan was born in the village of West Nijra in Ulpur Union, Gopalganj Sadar Upazila, Gopalganj District. His father was Abdus Sobahan Khan, and his mother was Mosammat Sakhina Begum.

== Career ==
Khan joined the Pakistan Army in 1956 and served in various roles leading up to the Liberation War in 1971. In 1971, he was posted at Joydebpur Cantonment as a Naik Subedar in the 2nd East Bengal Regiment. Following the mutiny at the cantonment, he left the post on 27 April and moved to Gopalganj. From there, he crossed into India and joined the war effort under Sector 2, commanded by Khaled Mosharraf.

On 3 December 1971, Khan was stationed with a platoon near Azampur, close to Akhaura Rail Junction, along the Dhaka–Chattogram–Sylhet railway line. The area was of strategic importance and frequently patrolled by Pakistan military. In the early hours of the morning, Pakistan Army launched a surprise attack on the Mukti Bahini position. A heavy battle ensued, with continuous shelling and increasing casualties among the fighters. Despite the intensity of the conflict, Khan and his commanding officer, Lieutenant Ibne Fazal Badiuzzaman, coordinated a counterattack. The Pakistani troops were eventually forced to retreat towards Brahmanbaria.

During the engagement, Khan was fatally wounded by enemy gunfire. He died on the battlefield before medical assistance could reach him. He was buried near Azampur Railway Station. In the same battle, eight other freedom fighters, including Lieutenant Ibne Fazal Badiuzzaman, were also killed. The battle resulted in the liberation of the Azampur railway area and its surroundings. Three days later, Akhaura was liberated under the command of Zahur Ahmed Chowdhury.

== Personal life ==
Khan was married to Nurun Nahar Khanam. They had two daughters.
