= Shahidul Islam (Lalu) =

Bangladesh Liberation War veteran

Shahidul Islam Bir Protik
- শহীদুল ইসলাম
- Born: Shahidul Islam; Gopalpur, Bangladesh
- Military career
- Allegiance: Mukti Bahini
- Branch: Kader Bahini
- Conflicts: Bangladesh Liberation War
- Awards: Bir Protik

Shahidul Islam (Lalu) (died May 25, 2009) was the youngest person to receive Bir Protik gallantry award. He was only 10 when he took part in the Bangladesh Liberation War.

== Bangladesh Liberation War ==
Shahidul went to Anwar Hossain Pahari and his group who were getting ready in the field of Keramjani Jawal School to obstruct the Pakistani Army. He was told he was too young, but was allowed to join upon persistent insistence upon his part. He joined Kader Bahini and Lalu went to India for training. He took part in many guerrilla operations liberating Gopalpur Thana. His role included combat and gathering information in disguise. After the liberation of Bangladesh, on 24 January Lalu along with the Kader Bahini submitted their weapons to the then President of Bangladesh. He also welcomed General Jagjit Singh Aurora, the head of the Mitro Bahini along with Kader Siddique in Tangail.

== Death ==
He died on 25 May 2009 at Dhaka Medical College Hospital.
