= Muhammad Ainuddin =

Bangladeshi army officer (d. 2022)

- Born: 12 February 1945; Lakshmipur, Kuliarchar Upazila, Kishoreganj District, British India (now Bangladesh)
- Died: 2 August 2022 (aged 77); Dhaka, Bangladesh
- Education: Bangladesh Military Academy
- Military career
- Allegiance: Pakistan (before 1971); Bangladesh
- Branch: Pakistan Army; Bangladesh Army
- Service years: 1966–1996
- Rank: Major General Service number: BA–201
- Unit: East Bengal Regiment
- Commands: CO of 9th East Bengal Regiment; Director General of Bangladesh National Cadet Corps; Deputy Director General of Border Guard Bangladesh; Chairman of Rajshahi Development Authority; Commander of Logistics Area; GOC of 19th Infantry Division
- Conflicts: Bangladesh Liberation War

Muhammad Ainuddin was a major general of the Bangladesh Army and a veteran of the Bangladesh Liberation War. He commanded the 9th East Bengal Regiment during the Bangladesh Liberation War.

== Early life ==
Ainuddin was born on 12 February 1945 in Lakshmipur, Kuliarchar Upazila, Kishoreganj District.

== Career ==
Aniuddin was commissioned on 8 May 1966 with the 1st War Course of Pakistan Military Academy. His parent unit was the 4th East Bengal Regiment. He was serving in the 4th East Bengal Regiment of the Pakistan Army based in Comilla Cantonment in 1971. After the launch of Operation Searchlight, he escaped and joined the Mukti Bahini in Brahmanbaria District.

Ainuddin played a significant role during the Bangladesh Liberation War, particularly in the operations at Koshba Puran Bazar as part of the broader campaign to liberate the Belonia Bulge of the K Force. On 22 October 1971, Sector Commander Lieutenant Colonel Khaled Mosharraf was severely wounded while overseeing an attack led by Captain Ainuddin and the 9th East Bengal Regiment on Pakistani positions. This engagement was a precursor to the subsequent large-scale offensive involving multiple regiments and coordinated efforts between the Mukti Bahini and Indian forces. Ainuddin’s leadership during the operation contributed to the strategic momentum that culminated in the decisive victories at Parshuram and Belonia, which marked a turning point in the eastern theatre of the Bangladesh Liberation War. He was awarded Bir Potik, the third-highest military gallantry award, for his contribution to the war.

Ainuddin served as one of the defense counsels in the secret military tribunal that followed the assassination of Ziaur Rahman, President of Bangladesh, and the subsequent killing of General Muhammed Abul Manzur. He was the martial law administrator of sub-zone 5, which included Dinajpur District and Rangpur District. He served as the record officer of the East Bengal Regimental Centre. On 1 April 1986, he took over as the director general of the Bangladesh National Cadet Corps. He served there until 29 June 1991. Then he eventually served as the deputy director general of Border Guard Bangladesh and later as the commander of Logistics Area. He took over as the chairman of the Rajshahi Development Authority on 9 July 1991. He served there until 1 February 1992. He was promoted to major general and served as the founding general officer commanding of the 19th Infantry Division.

Ainuddin retired as a major general from the Bangladesh Army on 14 June 1996. After retirement, he taught at North South University.

== Personal life ==
Ainuddin was married to Nazma Akhter Chowdhury. They had three daughters and one son.

== Death ==
Aiunddin died on 2 August 2022 at the Combined Military Hospital, Dhaka at the age of 77. His funeral was held at the Mohakhali DOHS Jame Mosque.
