= Abdul Awal Sarkar =

- Born: Brahmanbaria District
- Died: 1993
- Citizenship: Pakistan (before 1971), Bangladesh
- Known for: Bir Protik

Abdul Awal Sarkar (died 1993) was a freedom fighter of the Bangladesh Liberation War. For his courage in the war of independence, the government of Bangladesh awarded him the title of Bir Protik.

== Birth and education ==
Abdul Awal Sarkar's ancestral home is in Shadgaon village of Vijayanagar (former headquarters) upazila of Brahmanbaria District. His father's name is Aftab Uddin Sarkar and mother Kalestara Bibi. His wife's name is Halima Khatun Siddique. They have six daughters, two sons.

== Career ==
Abdul Awal Sarkar served in the Pakistan Navy and served in Karachi. When the War of Liberation began, he was at home on leave. In order to join the war of resistance, he went to India. Later, he joined the Bangladesh Navy.

== Role of the Liberation War ==
The final phase of the War of Liberation reached the Khulna waterside on the morning of 3 December when two gunboats of the freedom fighters and the Indian Navy arrived. Abdul Awal Sarker was on a gunboat of the Liberation Army. Suddenly three fighter jets were seen in the sky. The planes came around and bombed the freedom fighter's gunboat. It is a sudden catastrophe. Earlier, on 4 December, two freedom fighters 'Padma' and 'Palash' started sailing from India on their way to Bangladesh . Abdul Awal Sarker was in the Palash gunboat. The expedition began at Haldia by boat and on the way, two warships joined the Padma-Palash. One was the gunboat INS Panvel and the other was a BSF patrol craft named Chitrangada.

Later in the night, on 5 December, the warships reached Akram Point in Bangladesh. The final expedition started from Mongla at nine in the morning. There was INS Panvel in the front, followed by Palash and Padma at the end. When the warships were near the Pakistani naval base at Khulna, three fighter jets were seen in the sky. But then it was known that they were Indian aircraft. However, after some time, the planes went down a little to the south-west. Then he suddenly turned and bombed Padma and Palash soon after. Although the gunboats were not released, the Allies had a 4-foot-tall and 3-foot-wide yellow cloth on the ceiling to identify them. After that the accident happened. The Indian Air Force launched a raid on enemy lines. The bomb hit the freedom fighter's gunboat. In the two gunboats, there were three naval fighters, including Abdul Awal Sarkar. Some people have jumped into the water before realizing the danger. They remain intact. But many of the freedom fighters, including Auwal, were on the gunboat until the very last moment. Some of those who were in the gunboat were martyred and almost everyone else was injured.

Incidentally, Abdul Awal Sarkar was not injured in the attack. He jumped into the water with two seriously wounded warriors. There are other naval freedom fighters who jump like water. Many swim and go to the river. There was another danger waiting for them. Because the Pakistani army or their allies were razakar along the river. Abdul Awal Sarkar, Ruhul Amin and some of them were arrested. Ruhul Amin was handed over to the Pakistanis immediately after the assassination and torture of the rest. Pakistanis imprisoned him and others. After independence he was released.

== Awards and honors ==
- Bir Protik

== Footnote ==
This article has been copied from the report in the Prothom Alo, published on 2012-10-31. Prothom Alo has been released on Wikipedia by Creative Commons Attribution-Share-Alike 3.0 International License (License). The reports were written by Rashedur Rahman (who is also known as Rahman) in favor of the Daily Prothom Alo Liberation War Trust.
