= Shawkat Ali (officer) =

Bangladeshi fighter

- শওকত আলী
- Born: c. 1952; Naogaon, East Bengal, Pakistan
- Died: July 4, 2020 (aged 67–68); Chattogram, Bangladesh
- Children: 2
- Military career
- Allegiance: Bangladesh
- Branch: Bangladesh Army
- Service years: 1971 - 1996
- Rank: Major
- Unit: East Bengal Regiment
- Commands: Sub-Commander of Sector – I; 2IC of 8th East Bengal Regiment; DQ of 81st Infantry Brigade
- Conflicts: Bangladesh Liberation War
- Awards: Bir Protik

Shawkat Ali (c. 1952 – July 4, 2020) was a fighter in the Bangladesh Liberation War and a officer of the Bangladesh Army. For his immense bravery during the war, the government of Bangladesh awarded him the title of Bir Protik. He served as the sub-sector commander of Sector 1.

== Early life ==
Shawkat Ali was born around 1952 in the village of Khatteswar, Raninagar Upazila, Naogaon. He lived with his family in the Nasirabad Properties area of Chattogram. In 1968, he passed his matriculation and enrolled in Chattogram College, where he completed his intermediate studies in 1970. By 1971, he was a second-year honors student at Dhaka University.

== Role in the Liberation War ==
Shawkat Ali fought directly alongside a segment of the 8th East Bengal Regiment during the resistance phase in Chattogram. He served as the sub-sector commander of Sector 1 in the Liberation War. For his immense bravery during the war, the government of Bangladesh awarded him the title of Bir Protik.

== Death ==
Shawkat Ali died on July 4, 2020, while undergoing treatment at Chattogram Combined Military Hospital (CMH). He was buried in the cemetery adjacent to the Garib Ullah Shah Mazar in Chattogram.
