= Bir Protik =

Gallantry award in Bangladesh

Bir Protik

- Type: Military medal
- Awarded for: Bravery/Courage
- Presented by: Government of the People's Republic of Bangladesh
- Status: Awarded on 15 December 1973
- First award: 15 December 1973

Highlights
- Total: 426
- Total awarded posthumously: 60
- Total recipients: 426

Precedence
- Next (higher): Bir Bikrom
- Equivalent: Bir Durjoy
- Individual equivalent: 426

Bir Protik (Bengali: বীর প্রতীক, lit. 'Symbol of Bravery or Idol of Courage') is the fourth highest gallantry award in Bangladesh.

== Recipients ==
This award was declared on 15 December 1973. A total of 426 people have received the award so far, all for their actions during the liberation war of Bangladesh in 1971.

=== Bangladesh Army ===
Sl. no.	Name	Rank (At the time of award)
1	Mohammad Abdul Matin	Captain (Provisional)
2	Abu Taher Salauddin	Captain
3	Mohammad Abdul Matin	Major
4	Mohammad Matiur Rahman (2nd East Bengal)	Major
5	M Ain Uddin	Major
6	Akbar Hossain	Major (Temporary Lieutenant Colonel)
7	Mohammad Nazrul Haque	Major (Temporary Lieutenant Colonel)
8	Mohammad Bazlul Gani Patwari	Major (Temporary Lieutenant Colonel)
9	Mohammad Abdur Rashid	Captain
10	Mohammad Shahidul Islam	Captain
11	Syed Moinuddin Ahmed	Captain
12	Aktar Ahmed	Captain
13	Mohammad Anwar Hossain	Captain
14	Delwar Hossain	Captain
15	Sitara Begum	Captain
16	Didarul Alam	Lieutenant
17	Rashed Chowdhury (revoked)	Lieutenant
18	Syed Muhammad Ibrahim	Lieutenant
19	M. Harun-Ar-Rashid	Lieutenant
20	Ibne Fazal Badiuzzaman (Shaheed)	Lieutenant
21	Mohammad Nazrul Islam Bhuiyan	Lieutenant
22	Mohammad Humayun Kabir Chowdhury	Lieutenant
23	Mohammad Shafique Ullah	Lieutenant
24	Quazi Sazzad Ali Zahir	Second Lieutenant
25	Mahbubul Alam	Second Lieutenant
26	Sayed Ahmed	Second Lieutenant
27	Alik Kumar Gupta	Second Lieutenant
28	Nurul Azim Chowdhury	Captain
29	K. M. Abu Bakr	Second Lieutenant
30	Mizanur Rahman Mia	Second Lieutenant
31	Taher Ahmed	Second Lieutenant
32	Monzur Ahmed	Second Lieutenant
33	Samsul Alam	Second Lieutenant
34	Jamilud Din Ahsan	Second Lieutenant
35	Wakar Hasan	Second Lieutenant
36	Masudur Rahman	Second Lieutenant
37	Zahirul Haque Khan	Second Lieutenant
38	Waliul Islam	Second Lieutenant
39	Shawkat Ali	Second Lieutenant
40	Modasir Hossain Khan	Second Lieutenant
41	Rawshan Iazdani Bhuyan	Second Lieutenant
42	Jahangir Usman	Second Lieutenant
43	Mohammed Nurul Hoque Bhuiyan	Honorary Captain

=== Bangladesh Air Force ===
Sl. no.	Rank (At the time of award)	NAME
	Squadron Leader	Sadruddin Hossain
	Squadron Leader	Muhammad Hamidullah Khan

=== Bangladesh Navy ===
Sl. no.	NAME	Rank (At the time of award)
	Faruk-e-Azam	Unknown
	Rawshan Mehdi	Lieutenant (Gallantry operation at Rangamati)

=== Mukti Bahini (Freedom fighters) ===
Sl. no.	Rank (At the time of award)	NAME
12		William A. S. Ouderland (Sector-2)
119		Shahidul Islam (Sector-11)
351	Sub-sector Commander	Mahbubur Rob Sadi (Sector-4)
		Taramon Bibi
		Sitara Begum
		Golam Dastagir Gazi
		Waresat Hussain Belal
		Kakon Bibi
		Fazlul Hoque
		Abdul Awal Sarkar
		Ayez Uddin Ahmed

== Post Liberation War ==
=== Bangladesh Army ===
Sl. no.	ID no.	Rank (At the time of award)	NAME	Note
		Major	Hasinur Rahman	
		Capt (Later Brigadier)	A.T.M Anisuzzaman	
			S. M. Salahuddin Islam	For role in CHT conflict

== See also ==
- Bir Bikrom
- Bir Sreshtho
- Bir Uttom
