= Bir Bikrom =

Third highest gallantry award in Bangladesh

Bir Bikrom

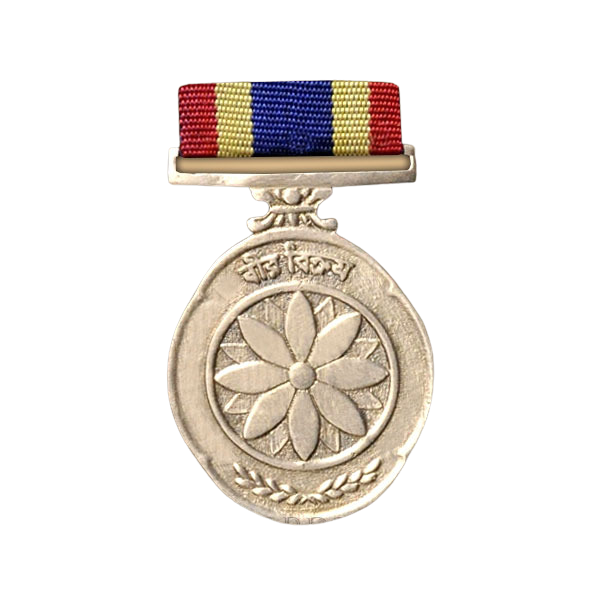
- Type: Military medal
- Awarded for: Bravery in the Bangladesh Liberation War
- Presented by: Bangladesh
- Status: 15 December 1973
- Established: 15 December 1973
- First award: 15 December 1973

Highlights
- Total: 175
- Total awarded posthumously: 82
- Total recipients: 175
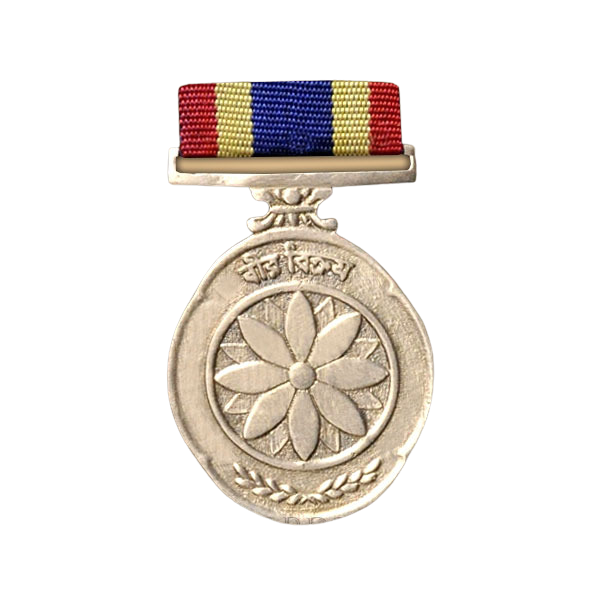
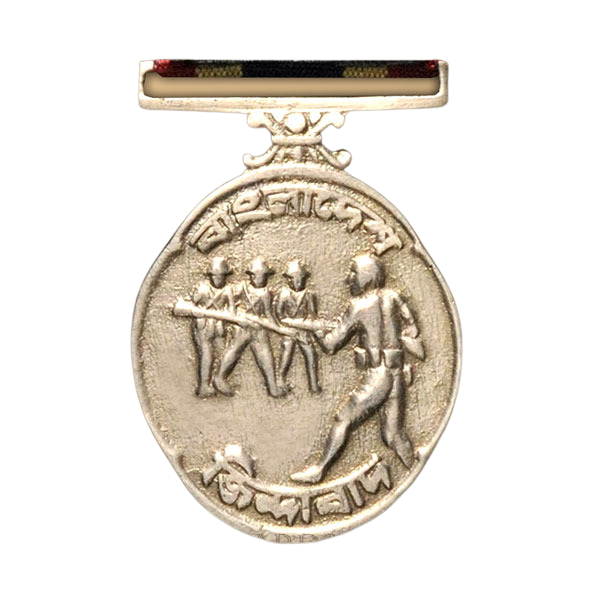

Precedence
- Next (higher): Bir Uttom
- Equivalent: Bir Chiranjib
- Individual equivalent: 175
- Next (lower): Bir Protik

Bir Bikrom (Bengali: বীর বিক্রম, lit. 'Valiant hero') is the third highest gallantry award in Bangladesh. Like the other gallantry awards, this was introduced immediately after the Bangladeshi Liberation War. Bir Bikrom was awarded to 175 fighters.

== Recipients ==
175 fighters have been awarded on 15 December 1973 for their heroic actions at the Liberation War of Bangladesh in 1971. The government of Bangladesh declared the name of the awardees in Bangladesh Gazette on 15 December 1973. This list has been prepared on the base of the Gazette. Additionally, two army officers were awarded Bir Bikrom during Chittagong Hill Tracts conflict such as: Major General Chowdhury Hasan Sarwardy and Brigadier General Mozzafor Ahmed.

== Liberation War ==
=== Bangladesh Army ===
Sl. no.	ID no.	Rank (At the time of award)	NAME
01	B.S.S.-9706	Captain	Oli Ahmed (অলী আহমেদ)
02	B.A.-7495	Major	Abu Saleh Mohammad Nasim (আবু সালেহ মোহাম্মদ নাসিম)
03	B.A.-6924	Major	Shafaat Jamil (শফাত জামিল)
04	B.A.-6994	Major	Moinul Hossain Choudhury (মঈনুল হোসেন চৌধুরী)
05	B.A.-7221	Major	Gias Uddin Ahmed (গিয়াস উদ্দিন আহমেদ চৌধুরী)
06	B.A.-7445	Captain	Mohsin Uddin Ahmed (মহসিন উদ্দিন আহমেদ)
07	B.A.-8343	Captain	Amin Ahmed Chowdhury (আমীন আহমেদ চৌধুরী)
08	B.A.-8734	Major	M.A.R. Azom Choudhury (এম . এ . আর. আজম চৌধুরী)
09	B.A.-8894	Major	Mustafizur Rahman (মোস্তাফিজুর রহমান)
10	B.S.S.-10691	Captain	Hafizuddin Ahmed (হাফিজউদ্দিন আহমেদ)
11	B.A.-6561	Major	Khondokar Najmul Huda (খন্দকার নাজমুল হুদা)
12	B.S.S.-9375	Major	Zafor Imam (জাফর ইমাম)
13	B.S.S.-10334	Captain	A. Y. M. Mahfuzur Rahman (এ . ওয়াই . এম . মাহফুজুর রহমান)
14	B.S.S.-9639	Captain	Mehdi Ali Imam (মেহদী আলী ইমাম)
15		Captain	Abdur Rob Choudhury (Late) (Sector-2)
16	B.S.S.-11431	Captain	S.H.M.B Noor Chowdhury (এস . এইচ . এম . বী . নূর চৌধুরী)
17	B.A.-12568	Captain	S I M Nurunnabi Khan (এস . আই . এম . নূর-ঊন-নবী খান)
18	B.S.S.-12307	Lieutenant	Imamuzzaman (ইমামুজ্জামান)
19	B.S.S.-11965	Lieutenant	Matiur Rahman (মতিউর রহমান)
20	B.S.S.-12176	Lieutenant	Abdul Mannan (আবদুল মান্নান) (E-Bengal)
21	B. A.-91970	Lieutenant	Golam Helal Morshed Khan (গোলাম হেলাল মোর্শেদ খান)
22	B. A.	Lieutenant	Shamsher M. Chowdhury (সমশের মবীন চৌধুরী)
23	S.S.=25	2nd Lieutenant	Khandakar Azizul Islam (খন্দকার আজিজুল ইসলাম) (Shaheed)
24		2nd Lieutenant	Mezbahuddin Ahmed (মেজবাহুদ্দিন আহমেদ)
25		Subedar Major	Abdul Zobbar Patwari (আব্দুল জব্বার পাটওয়ারী)
26		Subedar	Abdul Wahab (আব্দুল ওয়াহাব,)
27		Subedar	Muhammad Abdus Shukur (মোহাম্মদ আব্দুস শুকুর)
28		Subedar	Abdul Karim (আব্দুল করিম) (2-E.Bengal)
29		Subedar	Waliullah (ওয়ালিউল্লাহ)
30		Naib Subedar	Mohammad Amanullah (মোহাম্মদ আমানুল্লাহ) (Shaheed)
31		Naib Subedar	Mohammad Ibrahim (মোহাম্মদ ইব্রাহীম)
32		Naib Subedar	Vulu Miah (ভুলু মিঞা)
33		Naib Subedar	Abdus Salam (আব্দুস সালাম) (Shaheed)
34		Naib Subedar	M A Mannan (এম . এ . মান্নান)
35		Naib Subedar	Abdul Haque Bhuyan (আব্দুল হক ভুইঞাঁ)
36		Naib Subedar	I. A. R Ahmed (আই . এ . আর . আহমেদ) (Shaheed)
37		Naib Subedar	Abdul Malek (আব্দুল মালেক) (EPRHQ-3)
38		Naib Subedar	Mohammad Shahidullah Bhuyan (মোহাম্মদ শহীদুল্লাহ ভুইঞাঁ) (Shaheed)
39		Naib Subedar	Abdul Hashem (আব্দুল হাশেম)
40		Naib Subedar	Abdul Haque
41		Naib Subedar	Nur Ahmed Gazi (Shaheed)
42		Naib Subedar	Mohammad Ashraf Ali Khan (Shaheed)
43		Naib Subedar	Shamsul Haque (Sector-4)
44		Naib Subedar	Jonab Ali (2-E. Bengal)
45		Havildar	Nurul Haque
46		Havildar	Abdul Halim (Shaheed)
47		Havildar	Nur Islam (Shaheed)
48		Havildar	Rafiqul Islam (Shaheed)
49		Havildar	Ruhul Amin (Shaheed)
50		Havildar	F Afzal Hossain
51		Havildar	Rangu Miah (Shaheed)
52		Havildar	Shakim Uddin (Shaheed)
53		Havildar	Golam Rasul (Shaheed) (Sector-4)
54		L. Havildar	Taher
55		Naik	Afsar Ali
56		Naik	Abdul Haque
57		Naik	Abdul Motallib (Shaheed)
58		Naik	Nuruzzaman (Shaheed)
59		Naik	Touhid Ullah
60		Naik	Abdul Rahman
61		Naik	Md. Mohor Ali (Shaheed)
62		Naik	Abdul Khaleque (Former Navy)
63		Lance Naik	Mohammad Mostofa (Late)
64		Lance Naik	Sirajul Islam (Shaheed)
65		Lance Naik	Abdur Barek
66		Lance Naik	Abul Kalam Azad
67		Lance Naik	Delwar Hossain (Shaheed)
68		Sepoy	Tara Uddin (Shaheed)
69		Sepoy	Amir Khan Miraz (1-E. Bengal)
70		Sepoy	Md. Sanaullah (Shaheed)
71		Sepoy	Golam Mostofa Kamal (Shaheed)
72		Sepoy	Khandakar Rezanur Hossain (Shaheed)
73		Sepoy	Haidar Ali (2-E.Bengal)
74		Sepoy	Abul Kalam Azad (Shaheed)
75		Sepoy	Jamaluddin (Shaheed)
76		Sepoy	Abdur Rahim (Shaheed)
77		Sepoy	Nurul Islam Bhuyan (Shaheed)
78		Sepoy	Abdul Mannan (Shaheed)
79		Sepoy	Ali Ashraf (Shaheed)
80		Sepoy	Mujibur Rahman (Shaheed)
81		Sepoy	Abdul Haque (9-E.Bengal)
82		Sepoy	Ramjan Ali (Shaheed)(10-E.Bengal)
83		Havildar	Hemayet Uddin
84		Mojahid	Nurul Islam (Shaheed)
85		Mojahid	Abdul Khaleque (9-E.Bengal)
86		Mojahid	Sirajul Haque (Shaheed)
87		Mojahid	Ramij Udding (Late) (2-E.Bengal)
88		Mojahid	Captain Md. Tomijuddin (Shaheed)
89		Ansar	Elahi Box Patwari (Shaheed) (2nd Sector)
90	B.A-	Captain	Md. Jahangir Hossain (মোঃ জাহাঙ্গীর হোসেন)

=== Former East Pakistan Rifles ===
Sl. no.	ID no.	Rank (At the time of award)	NAME
91		Subedar Major	Fakaruddin Ahmed Choudhury
92		Subedar	Khandakar Motiur Rahman
93		Subedar	Moniruzzaman (Shaheed)
94		Naib Subedar	Sultan Ahmed
96		Naib Subedar	Syed Amurzzaman
97		Havildar	Abdul Hakim
98		Havildar	Jumma Miah (Shaheed)
99		Havildar	Abdus Salam
100		Havildar	Nazim Uddin
101		Havildar	U. K. Ghing
102		Havildar	Anis Mollah
103		Havildar	Mohammad Kamruzzaman Khalifa (Shaheed)
104		Havildar	Arob Ali
105		Havildar	Mohammad Nurul Islam (Shaheed)
106		Havildar	Tarique Ullah (Shaheed)
107		Havildar	Delwar Hossain (Shaheed)
108		Havildar	Azizul Haque (Shaheed)
109		Havildar	Mohammad Mozaffar Ahmed (Shaheed)
110		Havildar	Mohmmad Abul Kashem (Shaheed)
111		Naik	Mohmmad Abdul Malek (Shaheed)
112		Naik	Shah Ali (Shaheed)
113		Lance Naik	Mofizuddin Ahmed (Shaheed)
114		Lance Naik	Zillur Rahman (Shaheed)
115		Lance Naik	Lilu Miah (Shaheed)
116		Lance Naik	Mohammad Nizamuddin (Shaheed)
117		Lance Naik	Abul Khaer
118		Lance Naik	Abdus Sattar (Shaheed)
119		Sepoy	Abul Basar (Shaheed)
120		Sepoy	Abdul Majid
121		Sepoy	Ansar Ali (Shaheed)
122		Sepoy	Mohammad Ullah (Shaheed)
123		Sepoy	Atahar Ali Mollik (Shaheed)
124		Sepoy	Abul Motaleb
125		Sepoy	Seraj Miah (Shaheed)
126		Sepoy	Abdul Aziz
127		Sepoy	Muhammad Mohsin

=== Bangladesh Navy ===
Sl. no.	ID no.	Rank (At the time of award)	NAME
128	B.A-4		Amin Ullah Sheikh
129	A.B.		Mohammad H Mollah (Shaheed)
130	A.B		Mohammad Mohibullah (Shaheed)
131	R.E.N.-1		Fariduddin Ahmad (Shaheed)
132	Seaman		Mohammad Abdul Malik
133	S.T.W.D.-1		Mohammad Abdur Rahman
134	Submerinar		A. W. Choudhury (Sector-1)
135	M.E.-1		Abdul Rakib Miah (Shaheed)

=== Bangladesh Air Force ===
Sl. no.	ID no.	Rank (At the time of award)	NAME
136		Flight Sergeant	Syed Monsur Ali

=== Bangladesh Police ===
Sl. no.	ID no.	Rank (At the time of award)	NAME
137		Police Constable	Abdul Mannan (Shaheed)
138		Police Constable	Touhid (Shaheed)
139		Former P.S.P	Mahbub Uddin Ahmed

=== Civilian recipients ===
==== Sector-2 ====
Sl. no.	ID no.	Rank (At the time of award)	NAME
140		Mukti Bahini	Mohammad Shahjahan Siddiqui, Naval Commando
141		Mukti Bahini	kabiruzzaman (Shaheed), Naval Commando
142		Mukti Bahini	Mofazzal Hossain Chowdhury Maya, 56, Vojohori Saha Street, Dhaka-1
143		Mukti Bahini	Abdul Kashem Bhuyan (Shaheed)
144		Mukti Bahini	Abdus Salam, 1/3, Dilu Road, Dhaka
145		Mukti Bahini	Abdus Sabur Khan, Father-Sujat Ali Khan
146		Mukti Bahini	Swapan, 13, Koilash Ghosh Lane, Dhaka
147		Mukti Bahini	Kazi Kamaluddin, 13, Koilash Ghosh Lane, Dhaka
148		Mukti Bahini	Shafi Imam Rumi (Shaheed), Kshanika House, 355 Elephant Road, Dhaka
149		Mukti Bahini	Jewel, Father-Abdul Wazed Choudhury
150		Mukti Bahini	Bodiul Alom (Shaheed), 57 Monipuri, Tejgaon, Dhaka
151		Mukti Bahini	Mohammad Abu Bakar (Shaheed) son of Abu Jaffar, House-3, Road-96, Gulshan, Dhaka

==== Sector-4 ====
Sl. no.	ID no.	Rank (At the time of award)	NAME
152		Mukti Bahini	Mohammad Shahabuddin(Shaheed), Father-Kamaluddin
153		Mukti Bahini	Mahmud Hossain (Shaheed), Father-Yakub Ali
154		Mukti Bahini	Nilmoni Sarkar (Shaheed), Father-Atul Sarkar

==== Sector-5 ====
Sl. no.	ID no.	Rank (At the time of award)	NAME
155		Mukti Bahini	Jagat Joity Das(Shaheed), Father-Jitendra Chandra Das
156		Mukti Bahini	Sirajul Islam (Shaheed), Father-Mokbul Hossain
157		Mukti Bahini	Yamin Choudhury father -Abdul Hamid choudhury
158		Mukti Bahini	Matiur Rahman

==== Sector-6 ====
Sl. no.	ID no.	Rank (At the time of award)	NAME
159		Mukti Bahini	Abdus Samad (Shaheed)

==== Sector-7 ====
Sl. no.	ID no.	Rank (At the time of award)	NAME
160		Mukti Bahini	A. T. M. Hamidul Hossain, 12 Shamoli, Robin Bhaban, 50 No. Dhaka
161		Mukti Bahini	Mr. Siddique, Professor Sarda Cadet College, Village-Deluakhani, Post-Vangabari, District-Pabna
162		Mukti Bahini	Mohammad Idris Ali Khan

==== Sector-8 ====
Sl. no.	ID no.	Rank (At the time of award)	NAME
163		Mukti Bahini	Mohammd Khalil Saifuddin (Shaheed)
164		Mukti Bahini	M. A. Mannan, Village-Alphadanga, Thana-Faridpur, District-Faridpur
165		Mukti Bahini	Tawfiq-e-Elahi Chowdhury (Former CSP), Father-Late Delwar Choudhury, Village-Nateshahar, Thana-Bianibazar, District-Sylhet

==== Sector-9 ====
Sl. no.	ID no.	Rank (At the time of award)	NAME
166		Mukti Bahini	Khijir, Father-Jahan Box Tarofdar, Village-Char Kartikdia, Post-Kartikdia, District-Khulna
167		Mukti Bahini	Altaf Hossain (Shaheed), Father-Hazi Sobhan Molla, Village+Post-Vabanipur, District-Barishal

==== Sector-11 ====
Sl. no.	ID no.	Rank (At the time of award)	NAME
168		Mukti Bahini	Mohammad Yusuf
169		Mukti Bahini	Mohammad Khurram, Father-Mubarak Hossain
170		Mukti Bahini	Jamal Uddin (Shaheed), Father-Mr. Nasir Uddin
171		Mukti Bahini	Amanullah Kabir, Father-Ahmad Ali Master
172		Mukti Bahini	Bur Islam, Father-Md. Rafiquddin
173		Mukti Bahini	Mohammad Shawkat Ali Sarkar, Father-Ijab Uddin Sarkar
174		Mukti Bahini	Md. Abul Kalam Azad, Father-Kashem Uddin Sarkar
175		Mukti Bahini	Md. Shahjahan, Father-Jasim Uddin Sarkar
176		Mukti Bahini	Md. Habihur Rahman, Father-Moulavi Mod. Kashem Ali, Village-Madurapara, Sologosta, Post-Ghatail, District-Tangail

== Post Liberation War ==
=== Bangladesh Army ===
Sl. no.	ID no.	Rank (At the time of award)	NAME	Note
175		Major General	Chowdhury Hasan Sarwardy	For role in CHT conflict
176		Brigadier general	Mozzafor Ahmed	For role in CHT conflict
177		Major General	Mia Mohammad Zainul Abedin	For role in CHT conflict

== See also ==
- Awards and decorations of the Bangladesh Armed Forces
- Bir Shreshtho
- Bir Uttam
- Bir Protik
