= William A. S. Ouderland =

Dutch-Australian commando officer (1917–2001)

William Abraham Simon Ouderland Bir Protik
- Born: William Abraham Simon Ouderland; 6 December 1917; Amsterdam, Netherlands
- Died: 18 May 2001 (aged 83); Perth, Western Australia
- Military career
- Conflicts: World War II; Bangladesh Liberation War
- Awards: Bir Protik

William Abraham Simon Ouderland (6 December 1917 – 18 May 2001) was a Dutch-Australian commando officer. He actively took part in World War II and the Bangladesh Liberation War. Later, he was awarded the fourth highest gallantry award, the Bir Protik, by the Government of Bangladesh. He is the only foreigner to receive this gallantry award.

== Early life ==
Ouderland was born in Amsterdam on 6 December 1917. From 1920 - 1932 he lived with his german mother and sister in Köln - Sülz, Germany. His father, member of the dutch socialist party, brought him back to the Netherlands in 1932. He left his studies when he was 17 to work as a shoe-shiner and later joined Bata Shoe Company. In 1936, Ouderland enlisted in the Dutch National Service before the Nazi invasion in Netherlands. Later, he became a sergeant of the Royal Signal Corps and his team had 36 members. Following the invasion of Germany in Netherlands, France and Belgium, Ouderland was arrested. He escaped from prison and trained soldiers who came back from Germany in 1941. Ouderland was fluent in German and Dutch and started working as a spy for the Dutch Underground Resistance Movement.

== Bangladesh Liberation War ==
Ouderland came to Dhaka in 1970 as the Production Manager of the Bata Shoe Company. During the earlier half of 1971, Ouderland was appointed as the executive director of the company in Tongi, Dhaka. On 25 March 1971, rising political discontent and cultural nationalism in East Pakistan was met by suppressive force from the ruling elite of the West Pakistan establishment in what came to be termed Operation Searchlight. He was moved by the killings of the Pakistan Army on 25 March and took photos which he sent to the international media. A war between the West Pakistan Army and guerrilla force, the Mukti Bahini, started immediately.

Guerilla operations, which slacked during the training phase, picked up after August. Economic and military targets in Dhaka were attacked. Ouderland organised the guerrilla warfare in Dhaka. He built a friendly relationship with 22nd Baloch Regiment captain Sultan Newaz and penetrated into Dhaka cantonment. Subsequently, he created close relation with Governor General Tikka Khan and Adviser Civil Affairs Major General Rao Forman Ali. He became a "Distinguished Friend" of A. A. K. Niazi at the headquarters of Eastern Command and managed a security pass to contact with them frequently. Besides Ouderland continued gathering information for the Mukti Bahini and sent it to Major ATM Haider of Sector-2.

From his office at the Bata Shoe Company, Ouderland organised and trained the guerrilla fighters of Mukti Bahini. He planned and directed a number of guerrilla operations in Dhaka and nearby areas. He provided the fighters with food and medicine and often gave them shelter.

== Awards ==
Ouderland was awarded the Bir Protik, the fourth highest gallantry award of Bangladesh. In 1998, he was invited by the Prime Minister of Bangladesh, Sheikh Hasina, to receive the award and certificate but was unable to attend due to illness.

== Later career ==
Ouderland retired from Bata Shoe Company in 1978 and returned to Australia. On 18 May 2001, he died there at a hospital in Perth.
