= Jahangirabad Cantonment =

Bangladeshi military site

Coordinates: 24.8171184°N 89.3607464°E

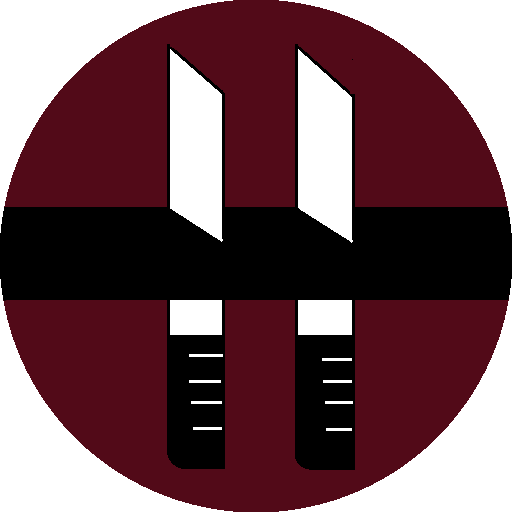
Jahangirabad Cantonment
- Bogra, Rajshahi, Bangladesh
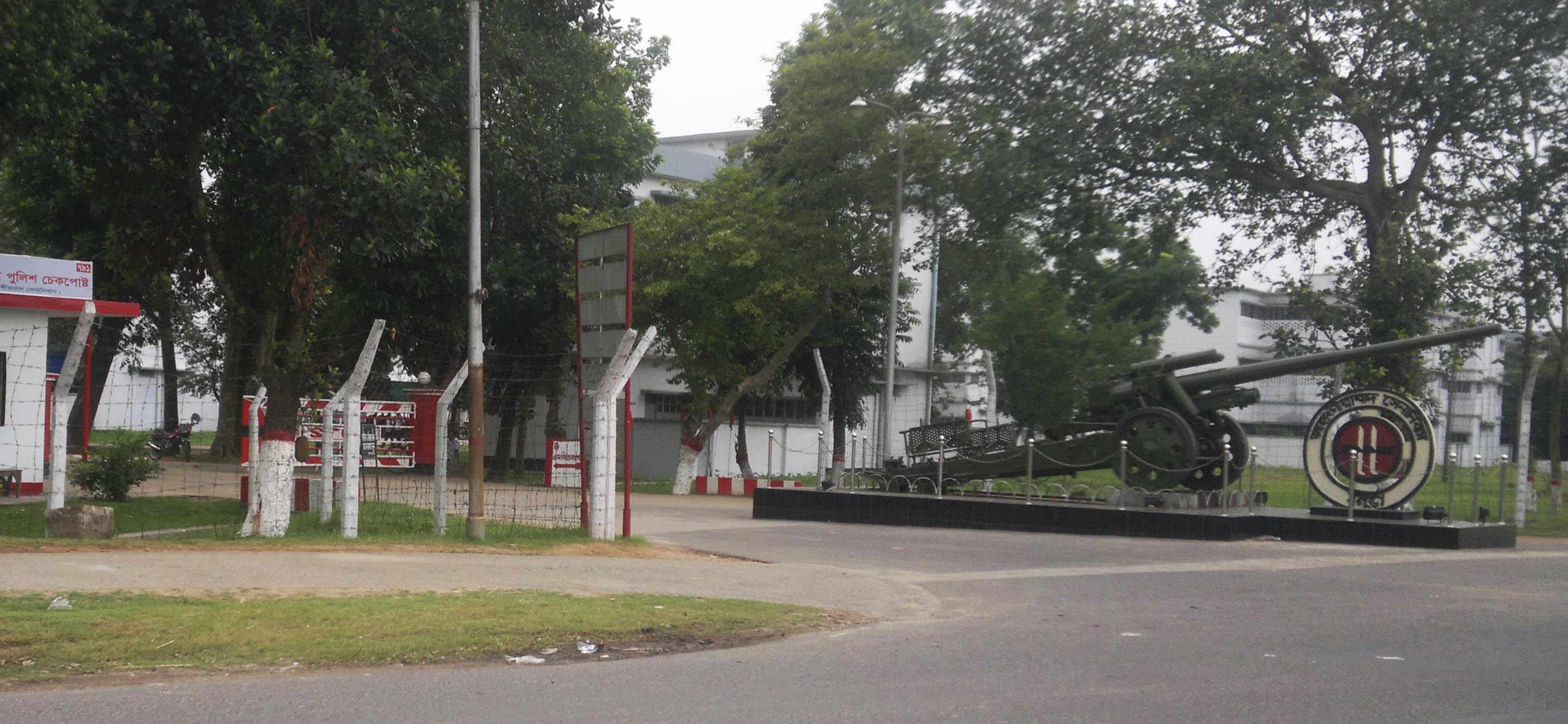
- Jahangirabad Cantonment Font Gate

Site information
- Type: Cantonment
- Controlled by: Bangladesh Army

Jahangirabad Cantonment is a military base located in Bogra, near Bogra city bypass road. It is the HQ of 11th Artillery Brigade.

== Installations ==
Commands under 11th Infantry Division

There are units from supporting corps of the army which fall directly under the infantry division.

- 11th Artillery Brigade

== Education ==
- Millennium Scholastic School & College
- Jahangirabad Cantonment Public School

== See also ==
- Bogra Cantonment
