= Tawfiq-e-Elahi Chowdhury =

Bangladeshi energy advisor

- তৌফিক-ই-এলাহী চৌধুরী
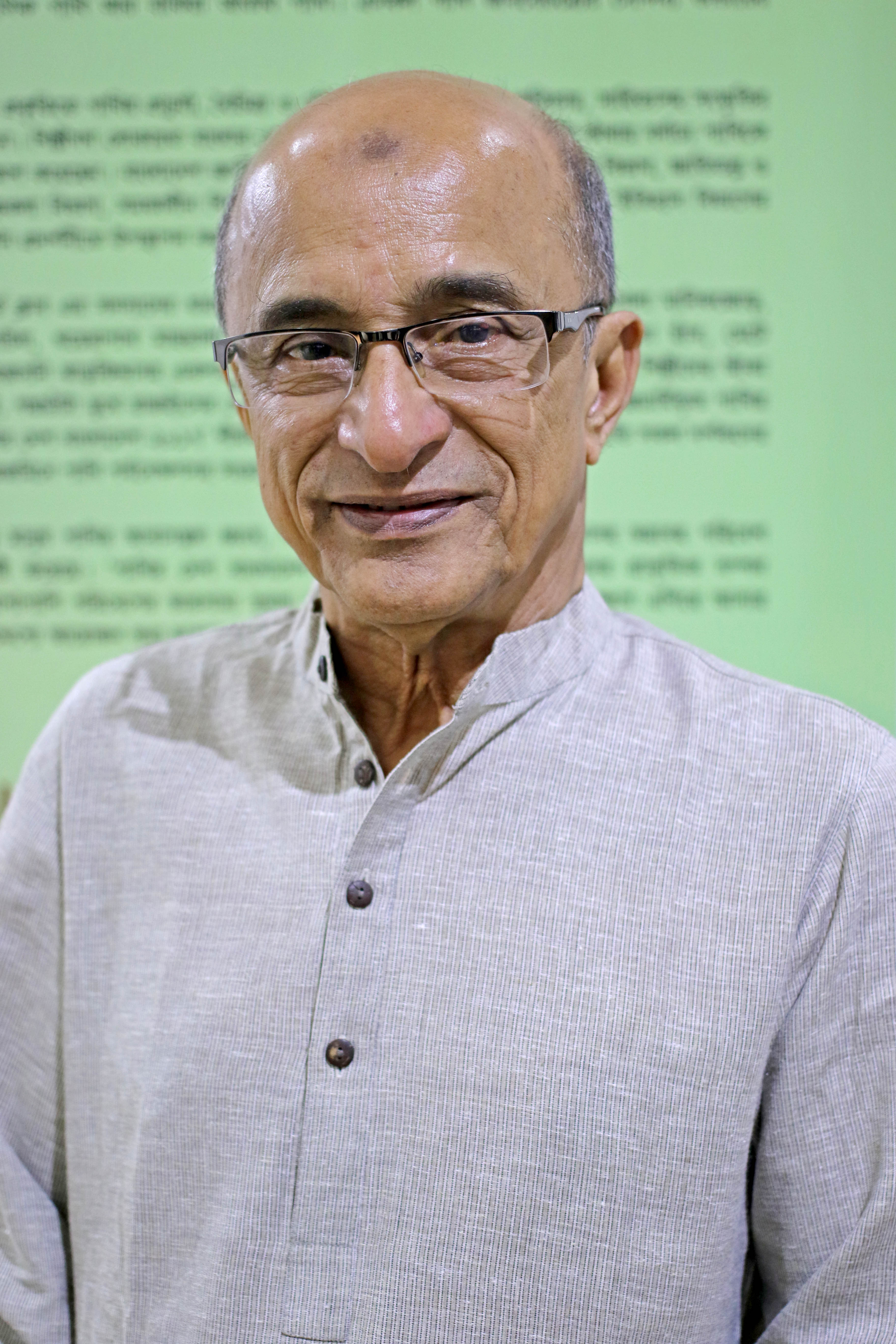
- Chowdhury in 2017

Adviser for Power, Energy and Mineral Resources
- In office 25 January 2009 – 6 August 2024
- Prime Minister: Sheikh Hasina
- Minister: Nasrul Hamid
- Succeeded by: Muhammad Fouzul Kabir Khan

Personal details
- Spouse: Asma Elahi
- Children: 2
- Education: Harvard University
- Awards: Bir Bikrom

Military service
- Allegiance: Bangladesh
- Branch/service: Mukti Bahini
- Unit: Sector - VIII
- Commands: Sub-Commander of Sector - VIII
- Battles/wars: Bangladesh Liberation War

Tawfiq-e-Elahi Chowdhury is a former energy adviser to the Prime Minister of Bangladesh, Sheikh Hasina, from January 2009 until August 2024.

== Early life ==
Chowdhury's ancestral home is in the village of Nateshwar in Beanibazar, Sylhet District. Chowdhury passed the Secondary School Certificate exam from Barisal Zilla School in 1959 and the HSC exam from Dhaka College in 1961. He earned his bachelor's in economics from the University of Dhaka in 1964 and his master's from Panjab University in 1965.

== Career ==
Chowdhury joined the Civil Service of Pakistan (CSP) in 1968 after a two-year stint as lecturer in economics at the University of Dhaka. He completed his post-graduate diploma from Leeds University, UK, in 1975. He earned his PhD from Harvard University in 1983. In 1971, as the sub-divisional officer of Meherpur, he joined the liberation war and was commissioned in the Bangladesh Armed Forces. He was decorated for gallantry as Bir Bikrom and was one of the chief organizers of the swearing-in ceremony of the first Government of Bangladesh in Mujibnagar, Meherpur, on 17 April 1971. He replaced Captain Abdul Halim as sub-sector commander of Benapole. He had served in the Shikarpur sub-sector, where he was replaced by Lieutenant Jahangir.

Later he reverted to civil service, and after several assignments, he went for higher studies in the United Kingdom in 1974. He was CEO and managing director of the Industrial Bank of Bangladesh (BSB). He served as secretary to the government of Bangladesh for nearly a decade in the Ministries of Food, Statistics, Power Energy & Mineral Resources and Planning. He also served as a visiting fellow at the Economic Growth Centre of Yale University.

Since his retirement from public service in 2002, Chowdhury has served as a consultant to, among others, UN agencies and multilateral organizations.

Chowdhury was appointed as an advisor to the prime minister of Bangladesh in January 2009 with the status of a minister. He advised on energy, power, and mineral resources.

On 10 September 2024, Chowdhury was arrested and put on a 4-day remand for interrogation in a case filed over the death of Suman Sikdar during the 2024 Bangladesh quota reform movement.

== Personal life ==
Chowdhury is married to Asma Elahi, a daughter of poet Jasimuddin. They have two daughters, Bushra Chowdhury and Mehnaz Chowdhury. In 2018, Chowdhury released an autobiographical book, Chariot of Life.
