= Mohammad Nazmul Haque =

Shaheed Mohammad Nazmul Haque (1 February 1924 – 1971) was the deputy director of anti-corruption in Chittagong until his kidnapping and presumed death at the hands of the Pakistan military. In 2015, the Shaheed Nazmul Haque Police Barrack in Naogaon District, his birthplace, were named after him following renovations. He was awarded the Independence Day Award in 2017 by the government of Bangladesh.

== Life and career ==
Haque was born in Naogaon in 1924. He earned his Higher Secondary Certification from Rajshahi College. He then earned bachelor's and master's degrees in English literature at Calcutta University. He later earned a Bachelors of Law (LLB) degree from Rajshahi University. Haque attended the International Police Academy in Washington, D.C. for higher police training.

Haque completed his police training from the Bangladesh Police Academy at Sardah near Rajshahi. He joined the East Pakistan police force as a sub-divisional police officer in Mymensingh in 1950. For over 20 years, he rotated between the districts of Faridpur, Kushtia, and Barisal.

In 1964, Haque's name was included as Police Service of Pakistan (P.S.P.). Subsequently, in 1967, he was awarded with the Pakistan Police Medal.

In 1971, while serving as deputy director of anti-corruption in Chittagong, Haque involved himself in the non-cooperation movement against the Pakistan military, responding to the national calls of Sheikh Mujibur Rahman. He led officers in the skirmish at the Dampara Police Lines between the Pakistan Army and police officers.

In 2015, Shaheed Nazmul Haque Police Barracks was inaugurated at Naogaon Police Lines in Haque's honor.

== Independence Day Award ==
In 2017, Haque was posthumously awarded the Shādhīnatā Puraṣhkār, or the Independence Award, given annually to notable citizens of Bangladesh. The award was received by his son Shahidul Islam Haque and his family.
