= M. Harun-Ar-Rashid =

Army chief of Bangladesh (1948–2025)

M. Harun-Ar-Rashid BP
- এম হারুন-উর-রশীদ

10th Chief of Army Staff
- In office 24 December 2000 – 15 June 2002
- President: Shahabuddin Ahmed; A. Q. M. Badruddoza Chowdhury
- Prime Minister: Sheikh Hasina; Latifur Rahman (acting); Khaleda Zia
- Preceded by: Mustafizur Rahman
- Succeeded by: Hasan Mashhud Chowdhury

Personal details
- Born: 15 February 1948 Tangail, East Bengal, Pakistan
- Died: 4 August 2025 (aged 77) Chittagong, Bangladesh
- Awards: Bir Protik

Military service
- Allegiance: Pakistan (before 1971); Bangladesh
- Branch: Pakistan Army; Bangladesh Army
- Service years: 1970–2002
- Rank: Lieutenant General
- Unit: East Bengal Regiment
- Commands: MS at Army Headquarters; GOC of 19th Infantry Division; Cmdr. of 21st Infantry Brigade; Cmdr. of Logistics Area
- Conflicts / operations: Bangladesh Liberation War; Chittagong Hill Tracts conflict; UNOMIG

M. Harun-Ar-Rashid (15 February 1948 – 4 August 2025) was a Bangladesh Army general who served as the chief of army staff of the Bangladesh Army from 24 December 2000 to 16 June 2002. The Bangladesh government awarded him the title of Bir Pratik for his bravery in the war of independence.

== Military career ==
Harun-Ar-Rashid was commissioned in the infantry on 6 September 1970 from the 24 War Course of PMA. In an interview, he said that 3 out of the top 4 cadets were Bengali and that he himself was 2nd in his batch. Given the choice of his unit, he chose the engineer corps. However, this infuriated his company commander, who wanted him to join the infantry corps and convinced him to choose the East Bengal Regiment instead. He was then commissioned to the 4th EBR in Comilla.

Hailing from the infantry corps, he most notably served as commander of the UN peacekeeping force in Georgia. He was known to have an academic bent of mind, having often been involved in teaching. He taught at the School of Infantry and Tactics as well as the Army Staff College.

Harun-Ar-Rashid was made army chief on 24 December 2000, taking over from General Mustafizur Rahman. He was the army chief when one British and two Danish surveyors were kidnapped in the Chittagong Hill Tracts by suspected militants unsatisfied with the peace deal.

He served till 2002, before being succeeded by Lt. General Hasun Mashhud Chowdhury.

Harun-Ar-Rashid was the first president of Army Golf Club.

== Post-military career ==
After retiring from the military, he served as ambassador to Australia, New Zealand and Fiji.

Harun-Ar-Rashid was the vice president of the Sector Commanders Forum. In 2015 he accused Pakistan of "threatening our national security". He supported increased government expenditure on defence but believed health and housing should get a higher priority.

Harun-Ar-Rashid was the president of Destiny Group. He was arrested when Destiny was accused of fraud and irregularities. He was granted bail on the grounds of "health" and "social status".

== Personal life and death ==
Harun-Ar-Rashid was married and had two children. He was found dead in a room at the Chittagong Club on 4 August 2025, whilst on his way to attend a court hearing. Harun-Ar-Rashid was 77.

== Bibliography ==
"Bijoyer Pothe" is on the Bangladesh Liberation War.
