= Ibne Fazal Badiuzzaman =

Ibn Fazal Badiuzzaman Bir Protik
- Born: 1949; Faridpur District, East Bengal, Dominion of Pakistan
- Died: December 3, 1971 (aged 21–22) Comilla District, East Pakistan, Pakistan
- Allegiance: Bangladesh
- Branch: Bangladesh Army
- Rank: Lieutenant
- Conflicts: Bangladesh Liberation War
- Awards: Bir Protik

Ibn Fazal Badiuzzaman (1949 – 3 December 1971) was a Bangladeshi military officer and Mukti Bahini member who was posthumously awarded the gallantry title Bir Protik for his role in the Bangladesh Liberation War in 1971.

== Biography ==
Badiuzzaman was born in 1949 in Kashiani Upazila, Gopalganj District, East Bengal, Dominion of Pakistan. His brother, Ibn Fazal Saiduzzaman, was a brigadier general of the Bangladesh Army.

Badiuzzaman was commissioned into the Pakistan Army. He was stationed at Rangpur Cantonment and was detained by the Pakistan Army along with other ethnic Bengali officers at the outbreak of the Bangladesh Liberation War. He escaped from the cantonment in August to India. He joined the 2nd East Bengal Regiment of the S Force of the Mukti Bahini. He served as a lieutenant and platoon commander of the Mukti Bhaini.

Badiuzzaman was killed in action on 3/4 December 1971 in Ramdhan Nagar, Akhaura Upazila, Brahmanbaria District. Three days later, Akhaura was liberated under the command of Zahur Ahmed Chowdhury. In recognition of his courage and sacrifice, he was posthumously awarded Bir Protik, the third-highest gallantry award. He is one of 426 people awarded Bir Protik.
