= Asoke Das Gupta =

Bangladeshi banker, businessman, and subsector commander

Asoke Das Gupta Sub Sector Commander of Liberation War of Bangladesh 1971 Sector 1

Asoke Das Gupta was a Bangladeshi banker, businessman, and subsector commander during the Bangladesh Liberation War. He was the first vice-chairman of ONE Bank.

== Career ==
Gupta fought in the Bangladesh Liberation War in 1971.

In April 2005, Gupta was elected first vice-chairman of ONE Bank.

Gupta was re-elected vice-chairman of ONE Bank in April 2016. He was elected vice-president of One Bank in June 2018. He was re-elected vice-chairman of ONE Bank in 2019 and 2020.

Gupta was the chief executive officer of IMTREX. He was the managing director of Uniroyal Trade Limited. He was the chairperson of Uniroyal Securities Limited and Ocunova Eye Hospital.

== Personal life ==
Spouse: Rakhi Das Gupta - English Teacher, Business Woman and Philanthropist

Son: Anirban Dasgupta, Managing Director of Uniroyal Securities Limited (utrade); Proprietor of nexim;

Father: Advocate Sailandranath Das Gupta based in Cumilla

Mother: Lila Das Gupta

Grandfather: Advocate Rai Bahadur Bhudhar Das Gupta, Government Pleader based in Cumilla

Great Grand Father: Vidyadhar Das Gupta, Inspector of Educational Institutes of Chittagong Zone

Great great Grand Father: Pandit Gangadhar Das Gupta, expert in Dharma Shashtra based in Manikganj, Dhaka

== Death ==
Gupta died on 13 December 2020.
