= Mohiuddin Jahangir =

Bangladeshi fighter and recipient of Bir Sreshtho award

Mohiuddin Jahangir Bir Sreshtho
- মহিউদ্দীন জাহাঙ্গীর
- Born: 7 March 1949; Babuganj, East Bengal, Dominion of Pakistan
- Died: 14 December 1971 (aged 22); Nawabganj, Rajshahi, Bangladesh
- Military career
- Allegiance: Pakistan; Bangladesh
- Branch: Pakistan Army (before 1971); Bangladesh Army
- Service years: 1967–1971
- Rank: Captain
- Service number: PSS-10439
- Unit: Corps of Engineers
- Commands: Sub-Commander of Sector – VII
- Conflicts: Bangladesh Liberation War †
- Awards: Bir Sreshtho

Captain Mohiuddin Jahangir BS (Bengali: মহিউদ্দীন জাহাঙ্গীর) (7 March 1949 – 14 December 1971) was a Pakistan Army officer who joined the Mukti Bahini during the 1971 war. He was born in the village of Rahimgonj under Babugonj Upazila of Backergunge District, East Bengal. He was an officer in Sector 7 of the Mukti Bahini and was killed while attempting to breakthrough enemy defenses on the bank of the Mahananda River.

His initiative seriously undermined the Pakistani Army's resistance in the area; eventually allowing, the Mukti Bahini to overrun the positions of the Pakistan Army. The main gate of Dhaka Cantonment, "Shaheed Birsreshto Jahangir Gate", is named in his honor.

He was awarded the highest recognition of bravery in Bangladesh.

== Early life ==
Mohiuddin Jahangir was born on 7 March 1949 at Rahimganj, Babuganj thana in Backergunge District, East Bengal. His primary education was at the Patarchar Primary School in Muladi. He achieved scholarships in talent pool in his 5th and 8th grade, and he passed his SSC examination from Muladi Mahbudjan High School in 1964. He finished his HSC from the Barisal BM College in 1966. In 1967 he enrolled at the department of Statistics at the University of Dhaka. On 5 October 1967 he joined the Pakistan Army as a cadet at the Pakistan Military Academy. Jahangir was then commissioned in the Corps of Engineers after successfully completing his training with the 15th war course. Later he was posted at 173 Engineer's Battalion in Multan. After working with the battalion for six months, he was shifted to Military College of Engineering in Risalpur. After finishing the 13-month-long training he took bomb-disposal training.

== Involvement in the war ==
In 1971, Mohiuddin Jahangir was working at the construction field at Chilas near the Karakoram. On 10 June 1971, he took a few days leave and went back to Risalpur. A day later, he started going towards the Sialkot border to reach India. He managed to cross the border and joined the Mukti Bahini at Mehdipur under Malda district in West Bengal. On 3 July, he became a captain of sector 7, Mohodipur. He was given the responsibility to fight at the Chapai Nawabganj border at Rajshahi district. In December he was ordered to take Chapai Nawabganj. On 14 December, he died after being shot during a battle near Nawabganj. He was buried near Sona Mosque premises and afterwards, was posthumously declared "Bir Shrestho". This award is one of the most highly honored awards in Bangladesh.

== Death ==
Tomb of Captain Mohiuddin Jahangir and Major Nazmul Huq

In December 1971, Jahangir was made the captain of a team in order to take control of Chapai Nawabganj from the Pakistanis. On 10 December he set his camp up at a place called Barghoria at the west of Nawabganj.

On 13 December, Jahangir divided his force into three groups in order to attack enemy camps at Chapai Nababganj and Rajshahi. One team, led by Lieutenant Rafiq, crossed Mohananda and proceeded towards Rohonpur-Nachole-Anupura and Nawabganj. The second team crossed the Mahananda River and marched towards the city. At this point Jahangir failed to establish any advantage over the enemy, so he continued with his team and crossed Mahananda and camped at Rehaichar before dawn. He intended to destroy one of the light machine gun bunkers of the Pakistan Army and crawled towards it. He managed to get close to the bunker and throw a grenade, but was shot in the forehead by a sniper atop a nearby house.

Pakistani soldiers didn't initially recognize him as an officer as he dressed like an ordinary soldier. His code name was "Tiger" and his soldiers responded on the radio with "Tiger is dead". He died in Chapainawabganj town. He was buried in Choto Shona Mosque premises at Mehdipur, where most of his activities had taken place during the war. Later, he was announced Bir Shrestho.

== Legacy ==
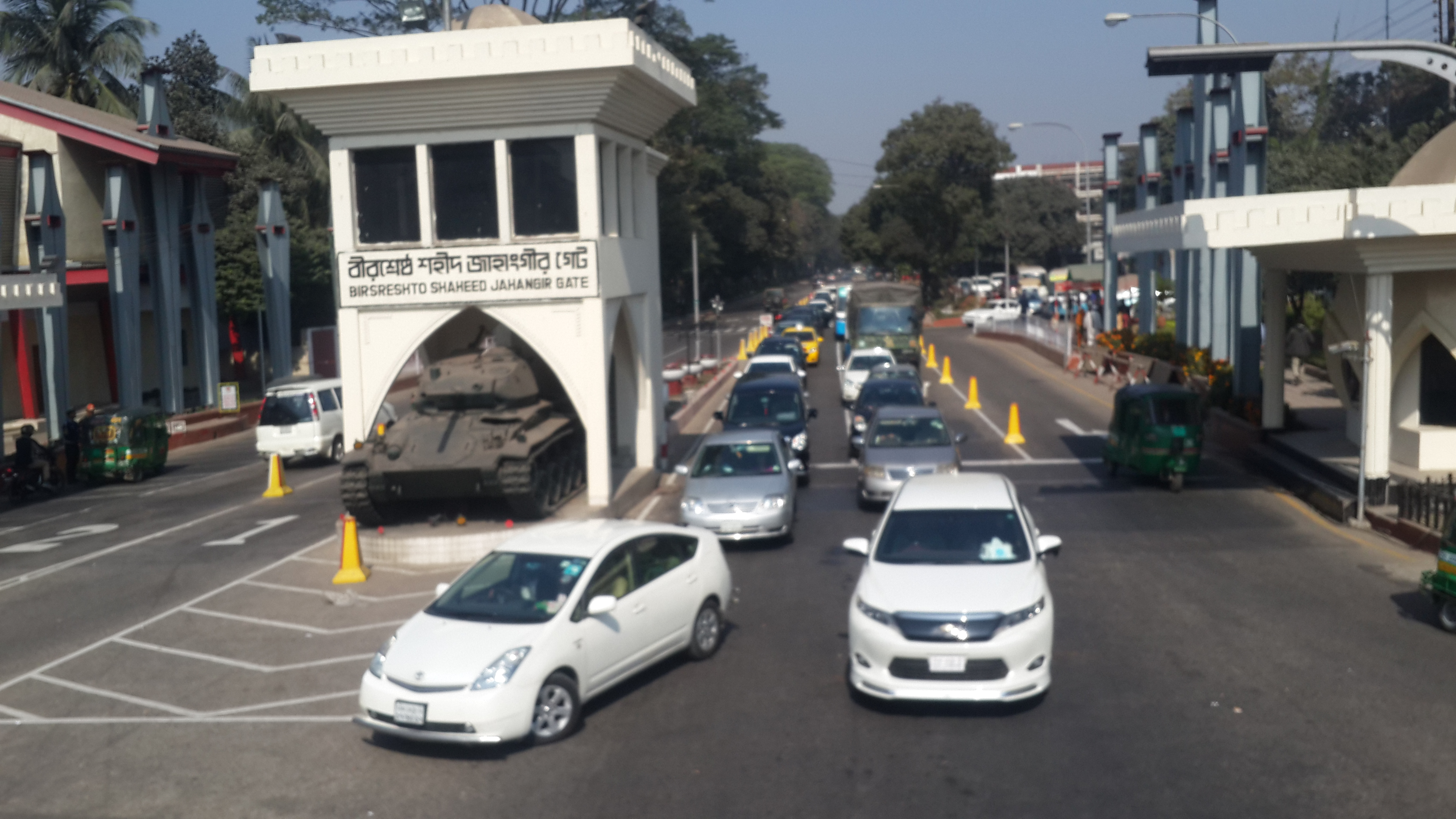
Front view of Birsreshto Shaheed Jahangir Gate, Dhaka cantonment. This gate was named after Mohiuddin Jahangir.

Birshreshtha Shaheed Captain Mohiuddin Jahangir College at Swarupnagar was named after him. The main gate of Dhaka Cantonment, "Shaheed Jahangir Gate", is named in his honour. Also, a college called Mohiuddin Jahangir College was named after him as well.

== Gallery ==
Tomb of Bir Sreshtho Captain Mohiuddin Jahangir and Major Nazmul Huq
