= 1996 Bangladeshi coup attempt =

Attempted coup d'état

1996 Bangladesh coup d'état attempt
Date	May 1996
Location	Bangladesh
Result	Coup Fails: Army chief of staff arrested and forced into retirement

Belligerents
Government of Bangladesh; Bangladesh Army	A section of Bangladesh Army led by the Chief of Army Staff

Commanders and leaders
President of Bangladesh Abdur Rahman Biswas; Chief of General Staff Muhammad Mahbubur Rahman; Mohammad Shubid Ali Bhuiyan; Ruhul Alam Chowdhury; M. A. Matin; Imam-uz-Zaman; Abdur Rahim	Chief of Army Staff Abu Saleh Mohammad Nasim; G.H. Murshed Khan; Hameedur Rehman

Units involved
9th Infantry Division; Directorate General of Forces Intelligence; 14th Independent Engineer Brigade	11th Infantry Division; 19th Infantry Division; 24th Infantry Division

Strength
Unknown	Unknown

Casualties and losses
None	None

The 1996 Bangladesh coup d'état attempt was a coup attempt in Bangladesh. The coup was launched by Army Chief of Staff Abu Saleh Mohammad Nasim against the president of Bangladesh Abdur Rahman Biswas. The coup failed and the Army chief of staff was dismissed.

== Background ==
In February 1996 the prime minister of Bangladesh, Khaleda Zia held elections which were boycotted by the main opposition, Bangladesh Awami league, led by Sheikh Hasina, who had demanded the elections be held under a neutral Caretaker Government. The constitution was amended and the formation of a neutral caretaker government took place. During the period between February and June, Major General G.H. Murshed Khan and Brigadier General Hameedur Rehman had spoken against the political situation of the country.

President Abdur Rahman Biswas asked the chief of staff of Bangladesh Army, Lieutenant General Abu Saleh Mohammed Nasim, to take action against the officers. Nasim refused which led the president to dismiss those officers through the defence ministry. G. H. Morshed Khan was the GOC of Bogra Cantonment and Hameedur Rahman was the deputy chief of Bangladesh Rifles.

== Coup ==
Lieutenant General Abu Saleh Mohammed Nasim revolted against presidential orders. He organised troops loyal to him. Nasim was placed under house arrest by troops loyal to the government and dismissed from service, after Nasim was fired on sedition charges.

The soldiers loyal to the government also blocked roads leading to the capital Dhaka as they might be used to bring troops loyal to General Nasim. The situation was more tense in northern Bogra Cantonment where the GOC, Major General G.H. Murshed Khan, was sacked by the president. Soldiers protected the Government TV and Radio stations.

General Nasim was placed under the custody of Military police and held in the VIP officers' mess. Soldiers from Bogra cantonment and Mymensingh Cantonment supported General Nasim. The soldiers from Mymensingh Cantonment tried to March to Dhaka but returned to their bases when the president ordered them to do so. Troops from Bogra cantonment could not reach Dhaka, as they could not cross the Jamuna River. The other side of Jamuna River was controlled by troops from Savar Cantonment who remained loyal to the president.

== Aftermath ==
Major General Mahbubur Rahman was appointed the new army chief by the president. Sheikh Hasina won the parliamentary election that was carried out by the Caretaker Government. General Mahbubur Rahman joined Bangladesh Nationalist Party after retirement. The failed coup strengthened the image of Bangladesh army and its willingness to support democracy.

== See also ==
- Military coups in Bangladesh
