= List of sectors in the Bangladesh Liberation War =

Map showing Bangladesh Liberation War Sectors

During the Bangladesh War of Independence, the Bangladesh Forces (not to be confused with Mukti Bahini) were divided in the geographical area of Bangladesh into eleven divisions designated as sectors. Each sector had a sector commander I.e. Division Commanders who directed the military operation further coordinated through several sub-sectors under sub-sector commanders who fought along with their troops and civilian resistance fighters. Most of the Sector Commanders and quite a number of sub-sector commanders remained in security under Indian BSF border camps such as Wing Commander Bashar, Major Shafiullah, Major Mir Shawkat Ali.

== History ==
=== Bangladesh Sector Commanders Conference ===
The history of the Bangladesh war of Independence dates back to April 1971 when it began its inception with the title of Bangladesh Forces during the first Bangladesh Sector Commanders Conference held in the week of July 11–17, 1971. It was at this conference during which time BD Forces was organized and formed for the independence struggle. It was significant in the light of its official creation and formation as Bangladesh Forces, its command structuring, sector reorganization, reinforcement and appointing war commanders were its principal focus.

This conference was presided over by the Prime Minister of Bangladesh, Tajuddin Ahmed, and Colonel M.A.G. Osmani, during which General Muhammad Ataul Gani Osmani was reinstated from retirement to active duty into the Bangladesh Forces as its senior most official. Colonel M.A.G. Osmani had thereby been appointed commander in chief of all Bangladesh Forces with Lt. Col M. A. Rab as Chief of Army Staff. Principal participants of this conference was Squadron Leader M. Hamidullah Khan, Major Ziaur Rahman, Wing Commander M Khademul Bashar, Major M. A. Jalil, Captain Haider, Lt. Col. M A Rab.

=== Structure ===
The Bangladesh Forces was organized for the war in 1971 into in 11 divisions (sectors) and later 3 indep brigades were christened, under BDF HQ situated at 8 Theatre Road, Calcutta, West Bengal. Bangladesh interim provincial government of July 11, 1971 appointed Col. M A G Osmani as commander in chief. Lt. Col Rab was appointed as Chief of Bangladesh Army Staff. In this meeting, Bangladesh was divided into Eleven Divisions (Sectors) under BDF Commanders.

BDF Commanders of the sectors directed the guerrilla warfare. For better efficiency in military operations each of the BFF sectors were divided into a number of sub-sectors. On November 21, 1971 Bangladesh Forces under Indian Army formed an allied command in which India took surrender of Pakistani forces on December 16, 1971. The table below provides a list of the BDF sectors along with the area under each of them, the names of the BDF commanders of 11 sectors and sub-sectors.

The 10th BDF Sector was directly placed under commander in chief and included the Naval Commandos and C-in-C's special force. These commandos were later absorbed into the Bangladesh Navy. BDF Commanders directed the guerrilla warfare against West Pakistani forces.

=== Indian participation ===
The Bangladesh Forces (BDF) received assistance from the Indian authorities soon after hostilities started. On December 3, 1971, The Indian Army entered Bangladesh through air and land. The Pakistani forces morally broken and militarily devastated by the BD Forces, agreed to a cease fire without defiance in about one and a half weeks, on December 16, 1971.

The ceasefire was switched to a surrender document by the Indian government which the commanding general of the Pakistan Army Eastern Command signed reluctantly. Victory was declared by the Indian authorities and all prisoners of war including combat material were taken to India. Bangladesh Forces were ordered for complete sector close down and demobilization on January 29 by end of March 1972 under the direction of General M.A.G Osmani in final Sector Commanders Conference held at the old Police HQ at 27 Old Mintu Road, Dhaka. All BDF sector Commanders along with C-in-C BDF Gen. M.A.G. Osmani transferred from their posts to respective services. The first government of Bangladesh was formed on 10 April 1971. They took an oath on 17 April 1971.

== List of sectors and sub sectors ==
Sectors of the Bangladesh War of Independence
Sector	Area	Sector Commander	Sub Sectors (Commanders)	Political Advisor
1	Chittagong District, Chittagong Hill Tracts, and the entire eastern area of the Noakhali District on the banks of the river Muhuri. The headquarters of the sector was at Harina.	• Major Ziaur Rahman (April 10, 1971 – May 5, 1971) • Captain Rafiqul Islam (June 10, 1971 – April 6, 1972)	1. Rishimukh (Flight Lieutenant Shamsul Islam); 2. Sreenagar (Captain Matiur Rahman, Captain Mahfuzur Rahman); 3. Manughat (Captain Mahfuzur Rahman); 4. Tabalchhari (Sergeant Ali Hossain); and 5. Dimagiri (Asoke Das Gupta).	
2	Districts of Dhaka, Comilla, and Faridpur, and part of Noakhali District.The headquarters of the sector was at Melaghar	• Major Khaled Mosharraf (April 10, 1971 – September 22, 1971) • Major ATM Haider (Sector Commander September 22, 1971 – April 6, 1972)	1. Gangasagar, Akhaura and Kasba (Mahbub, Lieutenant Farooq, and Lieutenant Humayun Kabir); 2. Mandabhav (Captain Abdul Hamid); 3. Shalda-nadi (Mahmud Hasan); 4. Matinagar (Lieutenant Didarul Alam); 5. Nirbhoypur (Captain Akbar, Lieutenant Mahbub); 6. Rajnagar (Captain Jafar Imam, Captain Shahid, and Lieutenant Imamuzzaman)and; 7. Nagarkandha (Sayed Abdul Halim)	R.K Chowdhury (April, 1971 - December 15, 1971)
3	Area between Churaman Kathi (near Sreemangal) and Sylhet in the north and Singerbil of Brahmanbaria in the south.	• Major K. M. Shafiullah (April 10, 1971 – July 21, 1971) • Captain A. N. M. Nuruzzaman (July 23, 1971 – April 6, 1972)	1. Asrambari (Captain Abdul Aziz Pasha, Captain Ejaz); 2. Baghaibari (Captain Abdul Aziz Pasha, Captain Ejaz); 3. Hatkata (Captain Matiur Rahman); 4. Simla (Captain Matin); 5. Panchabati (Captain Nasim); 6. Mantala (Captain MSA Bhuyan); 7. Vijoynagar (Captain MSA Bhuyan); 8. Kalachhora (Lieutenant Majumdar); 9. Kalkalia (Lieutenant Golam Helal Morshed); and 10. Bamutia (Lieutenant Sayeed)	R.K Chowdhury (April, 1971 - December 15, 1971)
4	Area from Habiganj District on the north to Kanaighat Police Station on the south along the 160-kilometre-long (100 mi) border with India. The headquarters of the sector was initially at Karimganj and later at Masimpur.	• Major Chitta Ranjan Dutta (April 10, 1971 – April 6, 1972) • Captain A Rob	1. Jalalpur Mahbubur Rob Sadi; 2. Barapunji (Babrul Hussain Babul F.F., Captain A Rab & Lieutenant Amirul Haque Chowdhury); 3. Amlasid (Lieutenant Zahir); 4. Kukital (Flight Lieutenant Kader, Captain Shariful Haq); 5. Kailas Shahar (Lieutenant Wakiuzzaman); and Subedar Major (Asst Director) Fazlul Haque Chowdhury EX EPR (from April'71 - August '71); 6. Kamalpur (Captain Enam)	
5	Area from Durgapur to Dawki (Tamabil) of Sylhet District and the entire area up to the eastern borders of the district. The headquarters of the sector was at Banshtola.	• Major Mir Shawkat Ali (April 10, 1971 – April 6, 1972)	1. Muktapur (Captain Qazi Faruq Ahmed, Subsector Commander, 16 June 1971 till 6 April 1972; Subedar Mujibur Rahman, Second in Command; Nayeb Subedar Nazir Hussain, Admin in charge(non-combatant); 2. Dawki (Subedar Major BR Chowdhury, (non-combatant); 3. Shela (Captain Helal); 4. Bholaganj (Lieutenant Taheruddin Akhunji); 5. Balat (Sergeant Ghani, Captain Salahuddin and Enamul Haq Chowdhury); and 6. Barachhara (Captain Muslim Uddin).; 7. Captain Abdul Mutalib was in charge of Sangram Punji (Jaflong) until 10 May 1971	
6	Rangpur District and part of Dinajpur District. The headquarters of the sector was at Burimari near Patgram.	• Wing Commander M Khademul Bashar (April 10, 1971 – April 6, 1972)	1. Bhajanpur (Captain Nazrul, Flight Lieutenant Sadruddin and Captain Shahriyar); 2. Patgram (initially divided between junior commissioned officers of the EPR and later taken hold by Captain Matiur Rahman); 3. Sahebganj (Captain Nawazesh Uddin); 4. Phulbari, Kurigram (Captain Abul Hossain); 5. Mogalhat (Captain Delwar); and 6. Chilahati (Flight Lieutenant Iqbal)	
7	Rajshahi, Pabna, Bogra and part of Dinajpur District. The headquarters of the sector was at Tarangpur near Kaliaganj.	• Major Nazmul Huq (April 10 – September 27, 1971) • Major Quazi nooruzzaman (September 30 – April 6, 1972) • Subedar Major A Rab	1. Malan (initially divided between junior commissioned officers and later taken hold by Captain Mohiuddin Jahangir); 2. Tapan (Major Nazmul Huq, also commanded by commanding officers of the EPR); 3. Mehdipur (Subedar Iliyas, Captain Mohiuddin Jahangir); 4. Hamzapur (Captain Idris); 5. Anginabad (unnamed freedom fighter); 6. Sheikhpara (Captain Rashid); 7. Thokrabari (Subedar Muazzam); and 8. Lalgola (Captain Gheyasuddin Chowdhury).	
8	In April 1971, the operational area of the sector comprised the districts of Kushtia, Jessore, Khulna, Barisal, Faridpur and Patuakhali. At the end of May the sector was reconstituted and comprised the districts of Kuhstia, Jessore, Khulna, Satkhira and the northern part of Faridpur district. The headquarters of the sector was at Benapole.	• Major Abu Osman Chowdhury (April 10 – July 17, 1971) • Major Abul Manzoor (August 14, 1971 – April 6, 1972)	1. Boyra (Captain Khondakar Nazmul Huda); 2. Hakimpur (Captain Shafiq Ullah); 3. Bhomra (Captain Salahuddin, Captain Shahabuddin); 4. Lalbazar (Captain AR Azam Chowdhury); 5. Banpur (Captain Mostafizur Rahman); 6. Benapole (Captain Abdul Halim, Captain Tawfiq-e-Elahi Chowdhury); and 7. Shikarpur (Captain Tawfiq-e-Elahi Chowdhury, Lieutenant Jahangir).	
9	Barisal, Patuakhali, and parts of the district of Khulna and Faridpur.The headquarters of the sector was at Hasnabad	• Major M. A. Jalil (July 17 – December 24, 1971) • Major MA Manzur • Major Joynal Abedin	1. Barisal (Assistant Adjutant of Ansar & VDP Mr.Fakir Abdul Mazed); 2. Potuakhali (Abdus Salam Mia); and 3. Shamshernagar.	
10	The operational area of the sector was at Bay of Bengal.	• Lieutenant AM Ataul Haque (July 17 – December 16, 1971)	None.	
11	Mymensingh and Tangail along with parts of Rangpur - Gaibandha, Ulipur, Kamalpur and Chilmari. The headquarters of the sector was at Teldhala until October 10, then transferred to Mahendraganj.	• Major Ziaur Rahman June 10, 1971 – October 10, 1971 • (Interim) Major Abu Taher (October 10, 1971 – November 2, 1971 (injured from minor grenade blast) • Squadron Leader M. Hamidullah Khan (November 2, 1971 – April 6, 1972)	1. Mankachar (Squadron Leader M. Hamidullah Khan); 2. Mahendraganj (Major Abu Taher; Lieutenant Mannan); 3. Purakhasia (Lieutenant Hashem); 4. Dhalu (Lieutenant Taher; Lieutenant Kamal); 5. Rangra (Matiur Rahman); 6. Shibbari (divided between junior commissioned officers of the EPR); Bagmara (divided between junior commissioned officers of the EPR); 1. Maheshkhola (a member of the EPR);	

== List of Brigade Formations ==
- Z Force, commanded by Lt. Col. Ziaur Rahman, consisted of 1, 3 and 8 East Bengal Regiment.
- Brigade Major - Captain Oli Ahmad
- D-Q Officer – Captain Sadeque
- Brigade Medical Officer - Dr. H K M Abdul Hye
  - 1st East Bengal Regiment – CO – Major Mohammad Ziauddin. 1st East Bengal Regiment's Senior Officer Major Ziauddin was appointed as CO on 12 August 1971 after the operational attack on Pakistan ArmyBOP at Kamalpur took place on 31 July 1971 under BDF Sector 11.
    - - Battalion Adjutant/Quartermaster: Flight Lieutenant Liaqat Ali Khan
    - 'Alpha' Company Commander: Captain Mahbubur Rahman
    - 'Bravo' Company Commander: Captain Hafiz Uddin Ahmad
    - 'Charlie' Company Commander: Captain Salauddin Mumtaz
    - Acting Company Commander – Second Lieutenant Anisur Rahman
    - Acting Platoon Commander – Second Lieutenant Wakar Hassan
  - 3rd East Bengal Regiment – CO : Major Shafaat Jamil.
    - - 2IC: Captain Mohsin Uddin Ahmad
    - - Battalion Adjutant: Flight Lieutenant Ashraful Alam
    - - RMO: Dr Wasi Uddin
    - - Acting Company Commander: Second Lieutenant Fazle Hossain
    - - Company Officer: Flight Lieutenant Ashraful Alam
    - - Platoon Commander: Second Lieutenant Manzur Ahmad
    - 'Alpha' Company: Captain Anwar Hossain
    - 'Bravo' Company: Captain Akbar Hossain
    - 'Charlie' Company: Captain Mohsin Uddin Ahmad
  - 8th East Bengal Regiment – CO: Major Abu Zafar Muhammad Aminul Haque
    - - 2IC: Captain Khaleq Uz Zaman Chowdhury
    - - RMO: Dr Belayet Hossain
    - - Acting Company Commander: Second Lieutenant Emdadul Haq
    - - Company Officer: Second Lieutenant Munibur Rahman
    - - Platoon Commander: Second Lieutenant Abu Zafar
    - 'Alpha' Company: Captain Khaleq Uz Zaman Chowdhury
    - 'Bravo' Company: Captain Sadeq Hossain
    - 'Charlie' Company: Lieutenant Modasser Hossain
    - 'Delta' Company: Lieutenant Mahbubur Rahman
  - 2nd Field Artillery Battery (Rawshanara Battery) – CO: Major Khandkar Abdur Rashid. During mid-September six 105 mm Howitzers were delivered at Assam's Masimpur district from India's Echo sector. Primarily with these six artillery pieces the 2nd FA battery was formed at Koishal, India, opposite Sylhet border area. From 10, 2 October FA battery assisted Z Force in the Sylhet sector in direct fire support and ground operations during multiple missions against Pakistan army strongholds.
    - - Battery Adjutant: Captain A. M. Rashed Chowdhury
    - - Battery Officer: Second Lieutenant Kazi Sazzad Ali Zahir
  - No. 1 Signal Company – Unit formed on 5 September 1971, CO: Captain Abdul Halim. Since October the First Signal Company of Bangladesh Forces was assigned to Z Force's 8th East Bengal Regiment and participated in every single mission. Notably in the Sylhet zone 4th and 5th Sector's Borolekha, Fultola, Adamtila, Biyani Bazar operations.
- K Force, commanded by Lt. Col. Khaled Mosharraf, was created in September with 4, 9 and 10 East Bengal Regiment.
  - 4th East Bengal Regiment - Commanding Officer - Major M.A. Gaffar Haldar
  - 9th East Bengal Regiment - Commanding Officer - Captain Muhammad Ainuddin
  - 10th East Bengal Regiment - Commanding Officer - Major Abdus Saleq Chowdhury (14 October-23 October) and Captain Zafar Imam (24 October-16 December)
  - 1st Field Artillery Battery - Commanding Officer – Captain Abdul Aziz Pasha
- S Force, with Major K.M. Safiullah, was created in October 1971 and consisted of 2 and 11 East Bengal Regiment.
  - 2nd East Bengal Regiment - Commanding Officer - Major Moinul Hossain Chowdhury
  - 11th East Bengal Regiment - Commanding Officer - Major Abu Saleh Mohammad Nasim
