= Bogra Cantonment =

Bangladeshi military cantonment

Coordinates: 24°45′34″N 89°23′21″E

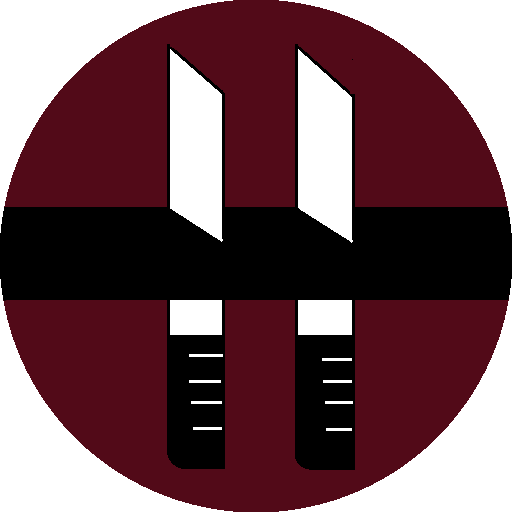
Bogra Cantonment
- বগুড়া সেনানিবাস
- Shajahanpur, Rajshahi, Bangladesh
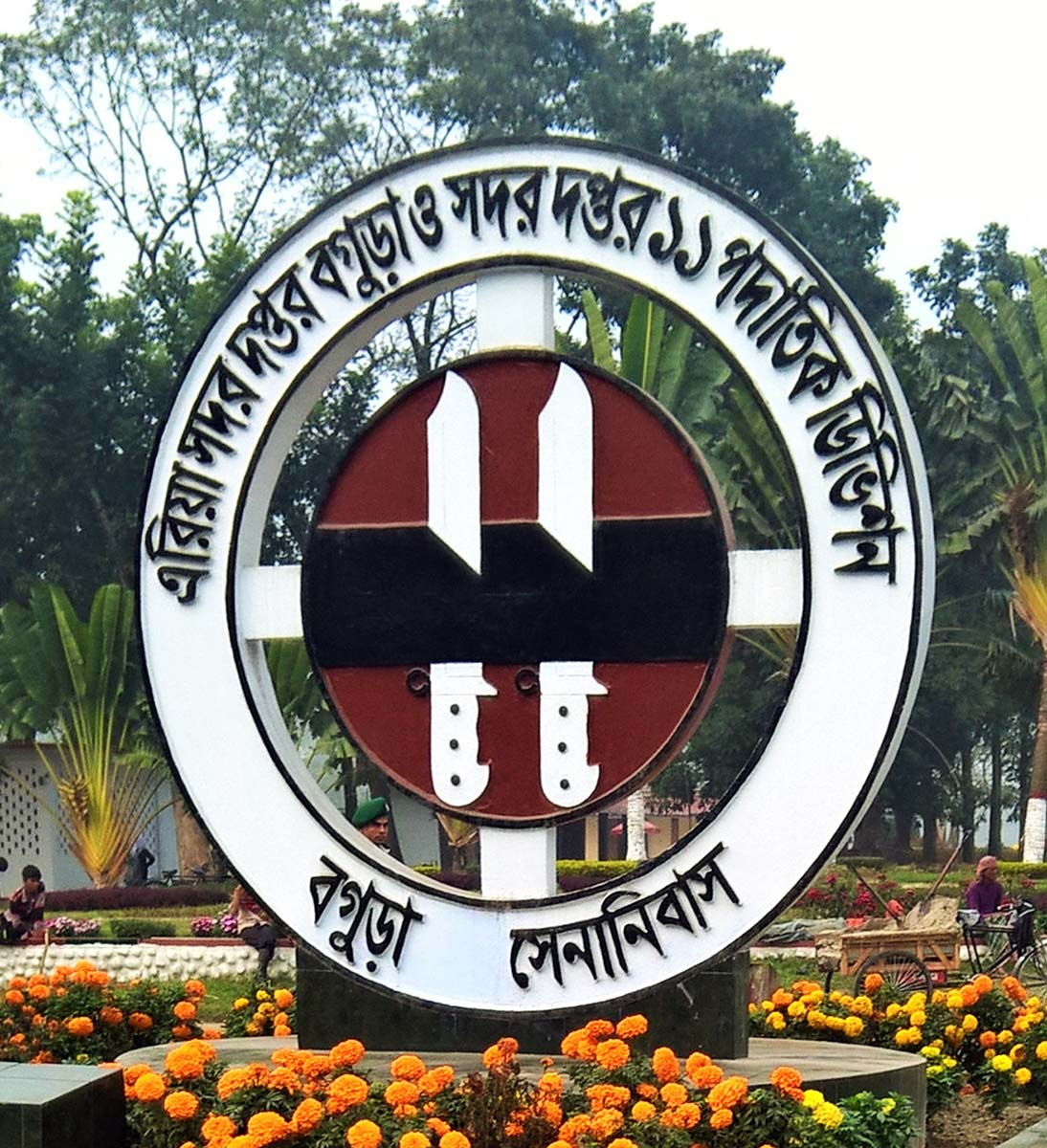
- Insignia of 11 Infantry Division at Bogra Cantonment

Site information
- Type: Cantonment
- Controlled by: Bangladesh Army

Bogra Cantonment, also known as Majhira Cantonment, is a cantonment located at Shajahanpur Upazila, Bangladesh. About 10 kilometers south of Bogura, a city in Rajshahi Division of Bangladesh.

It is the headquarters of the 11th Infantry Division of Bangladesh Army. The Armoured Corps Center & School (ACC&S), and the Non-Commissioned Officers Academy (NCOA) of the Bangladesh Army are also located there.

Beyond the military significance, Bogra Cantonment is home to an educational institution, the Bogura Cantonment Public School and College (BCPSC), established in 1979. The Cantonment Board, a local governing body, oversees the administration and infrastructure development within the area.

== See also ==
- Jahangirabad Cantonment
- Savar Cantonment
- Alikadam Cantonment
