= Abu Saleh Mohammad Nasim =

Former (7th) Army chief of Bangladesh

Abu Saleh Mohammad Nasim BB
- আবু সালেহ মোহাম্মদ নাসিম

7th Chief of Army Staff
- In office 31 August 1994 – 19 May 1996
- President: Abdur Rahman Biswas
- Prime Minister: Khaleda Zia; Muhammad Habibur Rahman (acting)
- Preceded by: Nuruddin Khan
- Succeeded by: Muhammad Mahbubur Rahman

Personal details
- Born: 4 January 1946 (age 80) Bikrampur, Bengal, British India
- Education: Faujdarhat Cadet College
- Awards: Bir Bikrom
- Website: tgenasmnasim.info

Military service
- Allegiance: Bangladesh; Pakistan (before 1971)
- Branch: Bangladesh Army; Pakistan Army
- Years of service: 1965–1996
- Rank: Lieutenant General
- Unit: East Bengal Regiment
- Commands: Chief of Army Staff; Director General at Directorate General of Forces Intelligence; Adjutant General at Army Headquarters; Commandant of Defence Services Command and Staff College; GOC of 19th Infantry Division
- Conflicts: Bangladesh Liberation War; Chittagong Hill Tracts conflict; 1996 coup d'état attempt

Abu Saleh Mohammad Nasim BB, psc (born 4 January 1946) is a former chief of army staff. In 1996, he attempted a military coup of the caretaker government which was preparing for general elections. After failure of the coup in 1996, he was arrested, placed under house arrest, and subsequently dismissed from service. That year, the Awami League was elected to power in the government. It reverted Nasim's dismissal from the military and later provided him with an honorable discharge.

== Early life ==
Nasim was born on 4 January 1946 to Bengali parents Mohammad Idris and Cheman Ara Begum in Bikrampur, Dacca district, Bengal Presidency (now Munshiganj District, Bangladesh). He graduated from Faujdarhat Cadet College. After graduating from there he was admitted to Dhaka University. While studying there he joined the Pakistan Military Academy.

== Career ==
Nasim was commissioned in the 2nd East Bengal Regiment in 1965. He participated in the Liberation war of Bangladesh. He was promoted to the rank of major during the war. He fought under Sector 2 and later under S Force as the commanding officer of the 11 East Bengal Regiment. He was appointed the chief of army staff by the Bangladesh Nationalist Party government led by the then Prime Minister Begum Khaleda Zia in 1993.

=== Coup in 1996 ===
Nasim staged an abortive military coup in 1996. On 19 May 1996, Abdur Rahman Biswas, the president of Bangladesh during a caretaker government, ordered Lt. Gen. Nasim to force the retirement of Major-General Morshed Khan, commander of Bogra Cantonment, and Brigadier Miron Hamidur Rahman, deputy chief of paramilitary Bangladesh Rifles. Both officers had issued statements expressing dissatisfaction with the country's situation. The president believed that they were involved in political activities with opposition parties. Nasim refused to comply. The next day, Biswas sacked him and sent soldiers to control the state radio and television stations. On noon that day, Nasim ordered soldiers of Bogra, Jessore and Mymensingh divisions to march towards Dhaka. The Ninth Infantry Division's Major General Imamuzzaman Chowdhury, who commanded the division located closest to Dhaka, remained loyal to the president. He directed the removal of all boats and ferries from Jamuna River in Aricha port, so that Bogra and Jessore divisions could not cross the river.

Nasim sent a contingent of troops with tanks to blockade the Dhaka-Mymenshing highway. This prevented Mymensingh Division Army from entering Dhaka. In the meantime, Major General Mohammad Anwar Hossain, general officer commanding of the 33rd Infantry Division located in Comilla, also came to the aid of the president. He mobilized a fully geared 101 Infantry Brigade, under the command of Brig. Shah Ikram (later Maj. Gen.) to Dhaka to fortify Bangabhaban, the presidential palace. The 33rd Division was deployed, using an infantry battalion and a company of tanks from the 7th Horse Armoured Battalion at the Dhaka-Chittagong highway, to create a blockade against the 24th Infantry Division located in Chittagong. The government broadcast announcements asking all soldiers to stay at their own cantonment. After some hours, Mymensingh Division soldiers returned to their barracks. The Chittagong Division never mobilized towards Dhaka. The general officer commanding of the Chittagong Division realized that the military coup was highly unlikely to succeed. That night, Nasim was interviewed by the BBC and, in reference to troop movements, he said that as army chief, he could move troops anytime he wanted. Nasim was arrested by the brigade commander of 14 Independent Engineers Brigade and put under house arrest in the army mess behind Army Central Library, Staff road, Dhaka Cantonment. Later the Awami League government, which was elected to power in 1996, granted him a formal retirement.
