= Politics of Bangladesh =

- · Government Seal · National Emblem
- Polity type: Unitary parliamentary republic
- Constitution: Constitution of Bangladesh

Legislative branch
- Name: Jatiya Sangsad
- Type: Unicameral
- Meeting place: Jatiya Sangsad Bhaban
- Presiding officer: Hafiz Uddin Ahmad, Speaker

Executive branch
- Head of state
- Title: President
- Currently: Mirza Fakhrul Islam Alamgir
- Appointer: Parliament
- Head of government
- Title: Prime Minister
- Currently: Tarique Rahman
- Appointer: President
- Cabinet
- Name: Cabinet of Bangladesh
- Current cabinet: Tarique cabinet
- Leader: Tarique Rahman
- Appointer: President
- Headquarters: Bangladesh Secretariat
- Ministries: 59 ministers, 353 departments and directorates

Judicial branch
- Name: Judiciary of Bangladesh
- Supreme Court
- Chief judge: Zubayer Rahman Chowdhury
- Seat: Supreme Court Building

The politics of Bangladesh operate in a framework of a parliamentary representative democratic republic, whereby the prime minister is the head of government and of a multi-party system. Executive power is exercised by the government. Legislative power is vested in both the government and parliament. The Constitution of Bangladesh was written in 1972 and has undergone seventeen amendments.

The current parliamentary system was adopted in 1991 and is based on the Westminster system. Between 1975 and 1990, the nation experienced military rule. A caretaker government was first introduced in 1990, after the resignation of military dictator Lieutenant General Hussain Muhammad Ershad to observe a neutral democratic election, as per demands of the two major political parties Bangladesh Nationalist Party (BNP) and Awami League (AL). Following the forced resignation of Ershad, Chief Justice Shahabuddin Ahmed was nominated as the Chief Advisor and observed the 1991 general election. A Caretaker government is headed by a Chief Adviser who enjoys the same power as the regular prime minister of the country except defense matters. The Advisors function as Ministers. After 1991, the Caretaker government has also held the elections of 1996, 2001 and 2008. Although, the first caretaker government was intended to help the transition from authoritarianism to democracy, this system was institutionalized in 1996, by the Sixth Parliament due to rising mistrust between the BNP and AL. In 2011, the then ruling party AL abolished the caretaker government system. This has been the biggest cause of dispute among many others between the BNP and the AL since then. After the AL Government became increasing authoritarian, the 2024 July uprising led to their ousting from the country. In 2026 BNP Government assumed leadership of the country while the Bangladesh Jamaat-e-Islami became the main opposition party.

The Economist Intelligence Unit rated Bangladesh a "hybrid regime" in 2022.

Main office-holders
Office	Name	Party	Since
President	Hafiz Uddin Ahmad	Bangladesh Nationalist Party	24 July 2026
Prime Minister	Tarique Rahman	Bangladesh Nationalist Party	17 February 2026
Parliament Speaker	Hafiz Uddin Ahmad	Bangladesh Nationalist Party	12 March 2026
Chief Justice	Zubayer Rahman Chowdhury	Nonpartisan	28 December 2025

== Political parties and elections ==
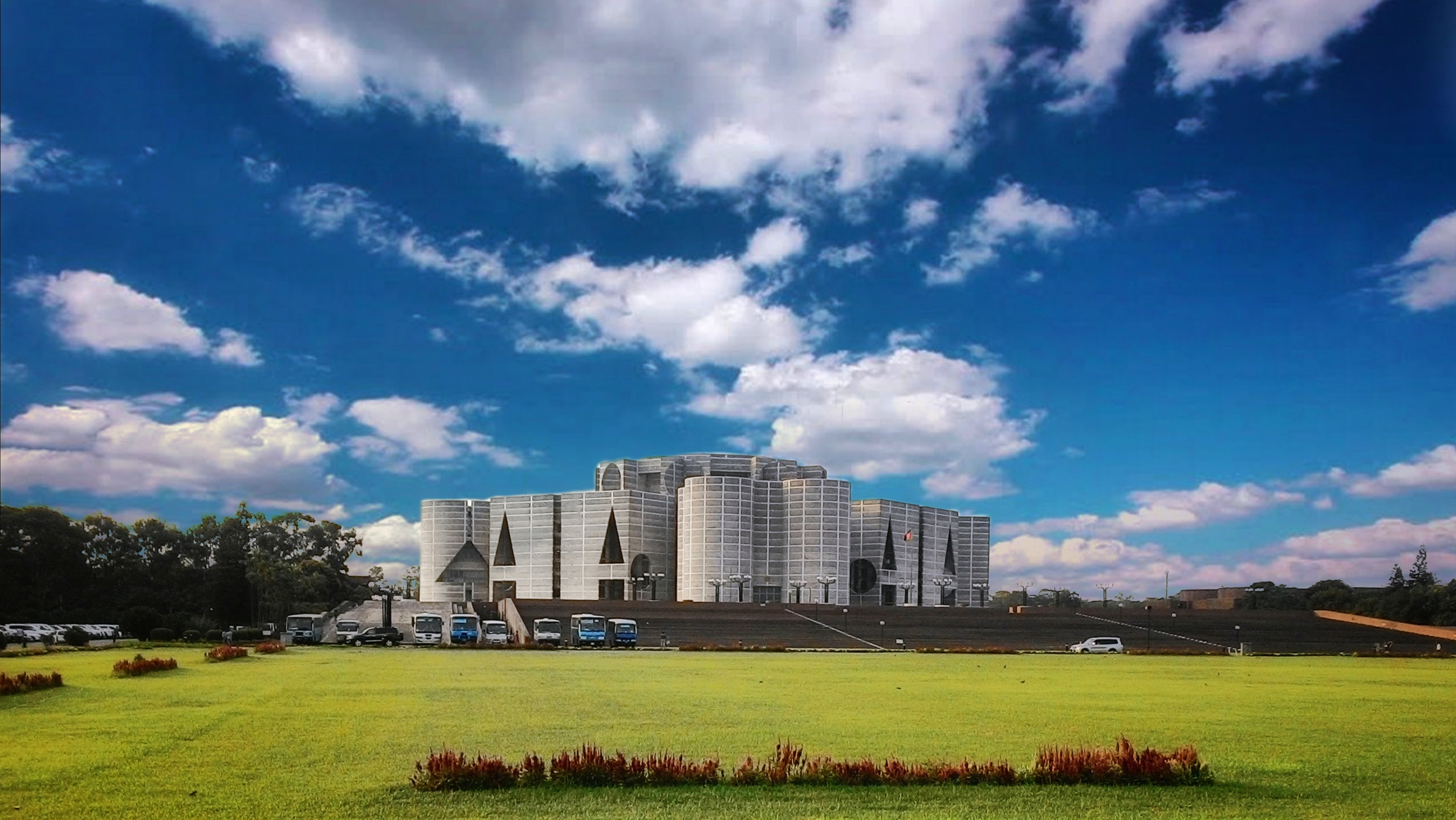
Parliament of Bangladesh (2019)

The two major parties in Bangladesh are the Bangladesh Nationalist Party (BNP) and Bangladesh Awami League. Traditionally, the BNP found allies among Islamist parties like Jamaat-e-Islami Bangladesh while the AL aligned itself with leftist and secular parties such as Jatiya Samajtantrik Dal. After the July Uprising in 2024 Awami League leaders fled the country weakening the party, while BNP and Jamaat split their collations becoming major opposing parties. In 2025 the leaders of the July Uprising formed the National Citizen Party. Another important player is the Jatiya Party, headed by late Hussain Muhammad Ershad's brother GM Quader. The Awami League-BNP rivalry from 1991 to 2024 has been bitter and punctuated by protests, riots, violence and murder. Student politics is particularly strong in Bangladesh, a legacy from the liberation movement era. Almost all parties have highly active student wings, and students have been elected to the parliament.

Three radical Islamist parties, Jagrata Muslim Janata Bangladesh (JMJB), Jama'atul Mujahideen Bangladesh (JMB) and Harkatul Jihad, were banned in February 2004 on grounds of militancy and terrorism. Following the first series of bans, a series of bomb attacks took place in the country in August 2005. Evidence of staging these attacks by these extremist groups had been found in the investigation, and hundreds of suspected members were detained in numerous security operations in 2006, including the two chiefs of the JMB, Shaykh Abdur Rahman and Bangla Bhai, who were executed with other top leaders in March 2007, bringing the radical parties to an end.

=== Election History ===
==== 1973 ====
The 1973 general election was held on 7 March 1973. There were 15 seats reserved for women.

==== 1979 ====
The 1979 general election was held on 18 February 1979. There were 30 seats reserved for women.

==== 1986 ====
The 1986 general election was held on 7 May 1986. There were 30 seats reserved for women.

==== 1988 ====
The 1988 general election was held on 3 March 1988. There were 30 seats reserved for women.

==== 1991 ====
The 1991 general election was held on 13 January 1991. There were 30 seats reserved for women.

==== February 1996 ====
Following boycotts by the main opposition party, the Bangladesh Awami League, the Bangladesh Nationalist Party won the uncontested elections. However, amidst protests, they were made to cave into Awami League's original demands, dissolve the parliament, and hold elections under a neutral caretaker government, after the enactment of the 13th amendment.

==== June 1996 ====
The Awami League had won a general election for the first time since 1973 by forming a coalition government, since they fell 5 seats short of a majority.

==== 2001 ====
The BNP won a two-thirds parliamentary majority and won the 2001 general election.

==== 2008 ====
The Awami League won a two-thirds parliamentary majority and won the 2008 general election.

==== 2014 ====
The Awami League were declared victors in 127 of 154 uncontested seats by default in the 5 January 2014 elections. Of the remaining uncontested seats, the Jatiya Party led by Rowshan Ershad won 20, the JSD won three, the Workers Party won two and the Jatiya Party (Manju) won one.

As a result of violence and the opposition boycott, voter turnout was only 22%. Results of 139 seats out of 147 were released, with the Awami League winning 105, the Jatiya Party winning 13, the Workers Party winning four, the JSD winning two and the Tarikat Federation and BNF winning one each. The remaining 8 constituencies election were suspended due to violence and re-election to be held. The newly elected MPs were sworn in on 9 January.

==== 2018 ====
The 2018 general election held on 30 December 2018, voter turnout was 80%. Bangladesh Awami League under the leadership of Prime Minister Sheikh Hasina won their 3rd term as the ruling party with 257 seats. The Jatiya Party became the main opposition party with only 22 seats.

==== 2024 ====
The 2024 Bangladesh general election was held on 7 January 2024.

==== 2026 ====
The 2026 Bangladesh general election was held on 12 February 2026 under the interim government of Muhammad Yunus.

== Nepotism and dynastic politics ==
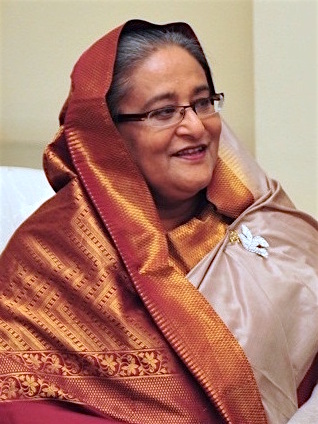
Sheikh Hasina

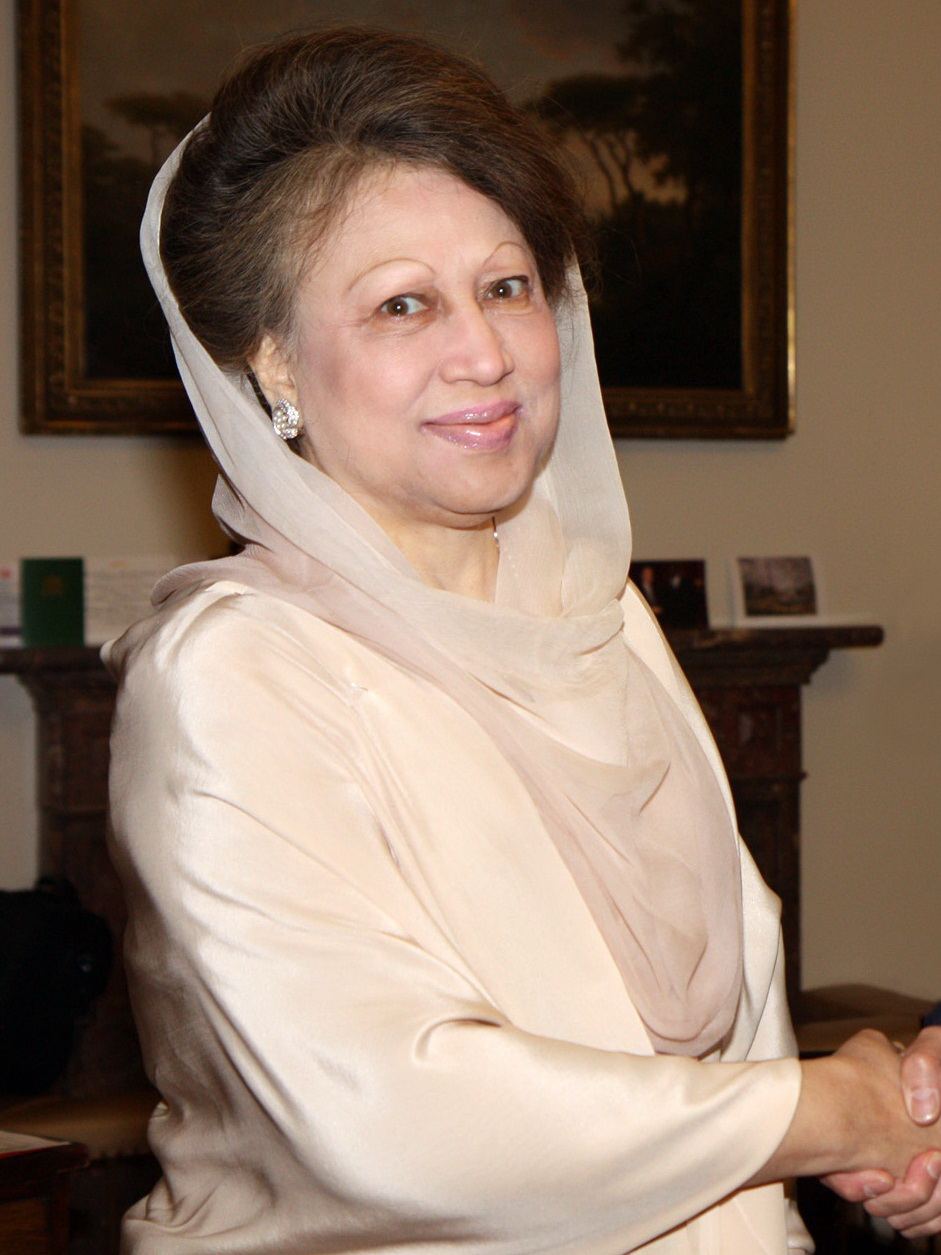
Khaleda Zia

Popularly known as the "Battling Begums"; The two women have ruled Bangladesh as prime ministers at various times between 1991-2024.

Political dynasties are a common occurrence in East Asia, and have been prevalent in Bangladesh since it gained independence. A political dynasty usually refers to a party or any political body run by a single family, with long-established economic or political dominance passed down or inherited. The influence of political dynasties often spills over to the general public sphere and prevalence of this phenomenon has the potential to discourage civil society organizations from taking part in politics

There are several suggested explanations for the prevalence and success of dynastic politics.

1. The name becomes synonymous with success and leadership, while connections and political capital.
2. Leaders who are connected in collective memory to momentous events are perceived as possessing positive characters such as courage and assertiveness, that can be passed onto the next generation.
3. The above explanation can be applied to parties themselves - party members tend to support candidates that are related to previously successful ones, due to the perception of inherited traits.
4. A tendency for traditionalism, especially in societies where family relations and kinship are central to the culture.
5. Poorer constituencies tend to gravitate towards wealthier, more well-educated politicians, that represent leadership skills as they perceive them.

Two major political dynasties, one led by former prime minister Khaleda Zia, the widow of former military ruler and president Ziaur Rahman and their son Tarique Rahman, alongside the prime minister Sheikh Hasina, daughter of Sheikh Mujibur Rahman, who has led the AL since 1981, are known for their rivalry.

In recent years, increased awareness of the adverse effects of this political system has caused some shift in public perception.

== Political issues ==
It is historically connected to the Westminster system of democracy of United Kingdom while Bangladesh was part of British Colonial Empire from 1757 to 1947. Since Bangladesh achieved its indendence on 26 March 1971 from Pakistan, Bangladesh introduced parliamentary democracy into its political system; however, a military coup in 1975 halted the process. It was restored in 1991 through a constitutional amendment.

=== Corruption ===
Bangladesh has seen political corruption for decades. According to all major ranking institutions, Bangladesh routinely finds itself among the most corrupt countries in the world.

=== Social issues ===
Social issues in Bangladesh range from liberal inceptions such as women's rights, religious liberty, religious freedom, modernity, industrialization to religious issues such as blasphemy laws, sharia legal system, religious conservatism and state religion. The two main parties, the Bangladesh Nationalist Party and the Awami League, both have contested against each other since the millennium over these issues.

== Background, Independence movement and Provisional Government ==
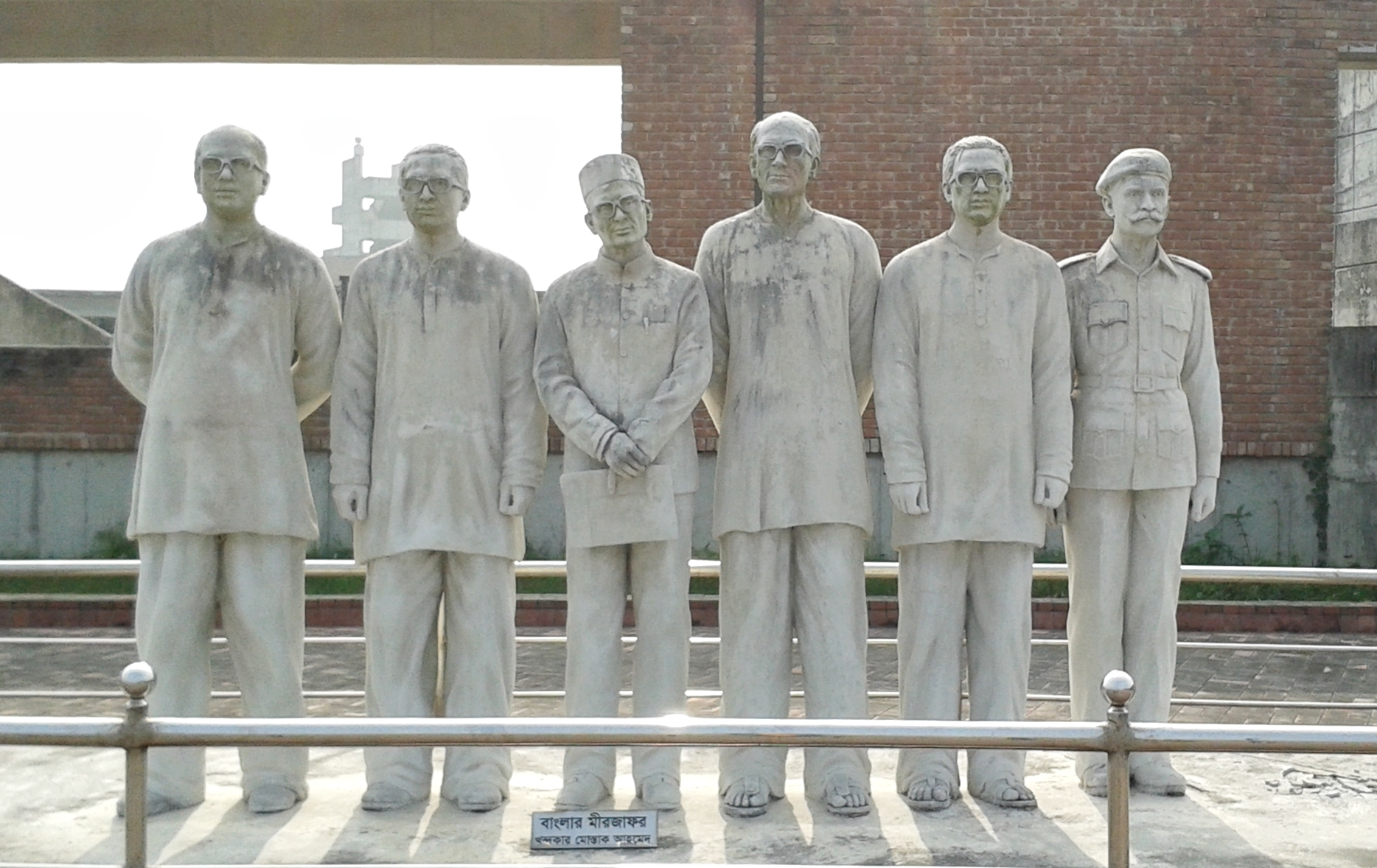
Sculpture of Cabinet members of the Provisional Government of Bangladesh; popularly known as Mujibnagar Government

After the British conquest of Bengal on 23 June 1757 and the overthrowing and execution of Nawab Siraj ud-Daulah, considered as the last independent ruler of the region before regaining independence almost 200 years later, the Bengal Presidency was divided in British India in the year 1947, as East Bengal and West Bengal mainly on religious grounds. East Bengal allied itself with the newly formed Muslim state of Pakistan and became known as East Pakistan. However the relations between West Pakistan and East Pakistan were politically strained due to various issues of inequality, language, culture and a large distance of over 2,000 kilometres between the two states separated by the foreign lands of India. The central power remained confined in West Pakistan, thus demand for total independent rule of East Pakistan begun. Following the Six point movement in 1966, led by Sheikh Mujibur Rahman, the East Pakistan independence movement gained further momentum.

On 5 December 1969, Sheikh Mujibur Rahman stated after independence East Pakistan will be renamed Bangladesh. The situation escalated after the 1970 elections and the 7 March 1971 speech of Sheikh Mujibur Rahman. After a brutal Pakistani army crackdown on the local people of Bangladesh on 25 March 1971 carried out under orders of Pakistan President Yahya Khan, Sheikh Mujibur Rahman, the Chief of Awami League and the leader of the liberation movement declared independence on 26 March 1971, which was broadcast from Chittagong radio station on 27 March, first by the then Awami League Secretary of Chittagong Mr Abdul Hannan and other Awami League leaders and then by Major Ziaur Rahman on behalf of Sheikh Mujibur Rahman in the evening of 27 March, thus starting the Bangladesh Liberation War. Captain Rafiq BU Commanding Officer of Chittagong East Pakistan Rifles revolted first and subsequently other commanding officers at different places: Major Shafiullah, Major Khaled Musharraf and Major Ziaur Rahman revolted with their forces. Sheikh Mujibur Rahman was arrested by the Pakistan Army in early hours of 26 March, immediately after he declared independence and was taken to West Pakistan, where he remained in jail until early January 1972.

Bangladesh's first government formed on 10 April 1971 and took the oath of office in Meherpur, Kushtia on 17 April 1971. Sheikh Mujibur Rahman was elected as the first president of the Provisional Government of Bangladesh, Syed Nazrul Islam was elected as the vice president, and Tajuddin Ahmed was elected as the first prime minister. Other major cabinet members were Mr Kamruzzaman, Mr Monsur Ali and Khodokar Mustaq Ahmed, all senior Awami League leaders. Sheikh Mujibur Rahman by virtue of his position as the president of Bangladesh became the Supreme Commander of the Liberation Army, while Colonel M.A.G. Osmani was appointed by the provisional government as the Commander-in- Chief of the liberation army. Subsequently, the provisional government formed its secretariat and designated top bureaucrats as chiefs of the divisions of the Secretariat. The Provisional Government later divided Bangladesh into eleven Sectors for conducting war efficiently and in an organized manner. This Government became the first legal political entity on behalf of the fighting people of Bangladesh and represented the people in the international arena. Prime Minister Tajuddin Ahmed started intergovernmental dialogue with the Indian Government immediately after the formation of the Provisional Government. Bangladesh achieved victory in the liberation war on 16 December 1971.

As this government was formed during the war of independence from Pakistan, its significance holds a distinction. Its temporary headquarters had been set up at 8 Theatre Road in Calcutta, India.

== Timeline of Political Leaders in Bangladesh ==
=== 1972–1975: Sheikh Mujibur Rahman ===
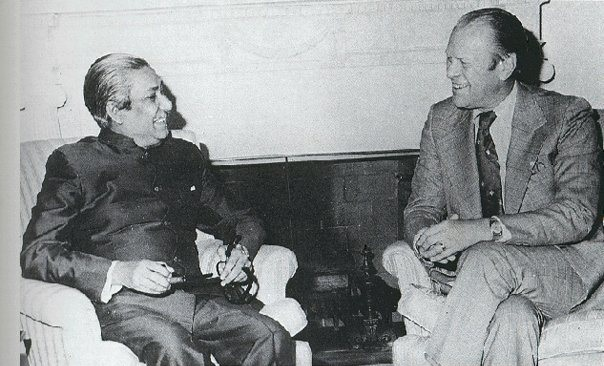
The Prime Minister of Bangladesh Sheikh Mujibur Rahman with U.S. President Gerald Ford in 1974

On 8 January 1972, the leader of the Liberation War and Liberation movement dictator Sheikh Mujibur Rahman was released from Pakistan Jail and was sent to London. On Mujib's arrival in London, he was met by the Prime Minister of UK and other world leaders. Sheikh Mujib returned to Bangladesh on 10 January 1972, by a British Royal Air Force Aircraft. Mujib congratulated the Bengali Mukti Bahini (the Bangladesh Liberation Force) for succeeding in the war of liberation against Pakistan army. Mujib was placed at the helm of government, according to the election victory under the unified Pakistan government. In 1973, after the first Bangladesh elections, he continued his term in office with immense backing from India, and public popularity, but had great difficulty transforming this popular support into the political strength needed to function as head of government. The new constitution, which came into force on 16 December 1972, created a strong executive prime minister, a largely ceremonial presidency, an independent judiciary, and a unicameral legislature on a modified Westminster model. The 1972 constitution adopted as state policy the Awami League's (AL) four basic principles of nationalism, secularism, socialism, and democracy. A key author of the constitution of Bangladesh was Dr Kamal Hossain, who has since been a major political figure of the country.

The first parliamentary elections held under the 1972 constitution were in March 1973, with the Awami League winning a massive majority, winning a historic 293 out of a total of 300 seats. No other political party in Bangladesh's early years was able to duplicate or challenge the League's broad-based appeal, membership, or organizational strength. Mujib and his cabinet having no experience in governance nor administration, relied heavily on experienced civil servants and political factions of the Awami League, the new Bangladesh Government focused on relief, rehabilitation, and reconstruction of the economy and society. Mujib nationalised the entire economy, banking and industrial sector. Economic conditions took a serious downturn. On top of that heavy corruption among his own party members, factions and senior leadership also added to the devastation and famine. The then U.S. Secretary of State had termed Bangladesh a "Bottomless Basket". Amid mass corruption and famine throughout 1974, in December 1974, Mujib decided that continuing economic deterioration and mounting civil disorder required strong measures. After proclaiming a state of emergency, Mujib used his parliamentary majority to win a constitutional amendment limiting the powers of the legislative and judicial branches, establishing an executive presidency, and instituting a one-party system, the Bangladesh Krishak Sramik Awami League (BAKSAL), which all members of Parliament were obliged to join. Crackdown on oppositions and news media begun by the government begun at the same time.

Despite promises, no sign of improvement in the economic situation surfaced. Implementation of promised political reforms was almost nil, and criticism of government policies became increasingly centered on Mujib. Serious disorientation in the armed services, disenchantment in society, deterioration of law and order created a huge mistrust of Mujib and his government including the Awami League itself. The then chief of army staff K M Shafiullah and chief of air staff A.K. Khandker stood stunned and idle during this situation. On 15 August 1975, Mujib, and most of his family, were assassinated by a small group of mid-level army officers. Mujib's daughters, Sheikh Hasina and Sheikh Rehana, happened to be out of the country. A new government, headed by former Mujib associate Khondaker Mostaq Ahmad, was formed.

=== August–November 1975: Khondaker Mostaq Ahmad ===
Mujib's senior cabinet minister Khondaker Mostaq Ahmad formed a new government and immediately initiated a few critical changes in Mujib's policies and rules of business in government. The notorious Jail Killings happened during this period, amidst the confusion in which Bangladesh was plunged on 3 November. On the same day, Brig General Khaled Mosharraf launched his own coup fundamentally as a move to restore the chain of command broken in the army Musharraf moved swiftly to remove Moshtaque Ahmad from office. On 7 November Khaled Musharaf was killed in a counter coup engineered by Colonel Abu Taher.

=== 1975–1981: Ziaur Rahman ===
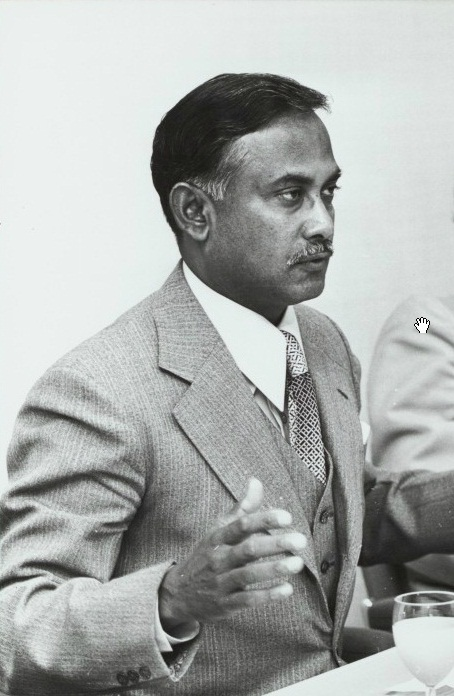
Ziaur Rahman delivering a speech at a public conference in 1979

Following Khondaker Mostaq Ahmad's removal and assassination of Brigadier General Khaled Musharaf by a segment of army personnel in 1975, a very short lived revolution resulted in the emergence of arrested deputy Army Chief of Staff Major General Ziaur Rahman, who managed to take the lead and bring the whole nation out of a political quagmire. His first action was to communicate to the people through radio and television and bring order and calm to the nation. He pledged full support to the civilian government headed by President Chief Justice Sayem. Acting at Zia's behest, Sayem dissolved Parliament, and instituted state of emergency under martial law. Zia brought an end to the turbulence within the army. In 1976, Colonel Abu Taher was tried for treason and executed. Fresh elections were to be in 1977 under a multi party democracy with full freedom of the press.

Acting behind the scenes of the Martial Law Administration (MLA), Zia sought to invigorate government policy and administration. Lifting the ban on political parties from Mujib's one party BAKSAL rule, he sought to revitalize the demoralized bureaucracy, to begin new economic development programs, infrastructure buildup, a free press and to emphasize family planning. In November 1976, Zia became Chief Martial Law Administrator (CMLA) and assumed the presidency upon Sayem's retirement 5 months later, on 21 April 1977.

As President, Zia announced a 19-point program of economic reform and began dismantling the MLA. Keeping his promise to hold elections, Zia won a 5-year term in the June 1978 elections, with 76% of the vote. In November 1978, his government removed the remaining restrictions on political party activities in time for parliamentary elections in February 1979. These elections, which were contested by more than 30 parties, marked the culmination of Zia's transformation of Bangladesh's Government from the MLA to a democratically elected, constitutional one. The Bangladesh Nationalist Party (BNP), founded by Zia on 1 September 1978, emerged as a major political party. The efficient governance of the BNP ended the economic downturn that had begun in 1974 by 1978 through rapid economic growth and industrialization achieved via free market economic policies. The constitution was again amended to provide for an executive prime minister appointed by the president, and responsible to a parliamentary majority. Zia invigorated a strong foreign policy based on sovereignty and economic independence. He initiated many social programs to uplift the poor through honest hard work and education. During this period, Bangladesh's economy achieved fast economic and industrial growth. His greatest legacy on the people of Bangladesh was unity and self-dependence.

On 30 May 1981 Zia was assassinated in Chittagong by dissident elements of the military. There was no coup or uprising attempted, and the major conspirators were never taken into custody or killed.

=== 1981-1982: Abdus Sattar ===
In accordance with the constitution, Vice President Justice Abdus Sattar was sworn in as acting president after the assassination of Ziaur Rahman. He immediately set out to continue Zia's policies and called for fresh elections. Due to President Zia's tremendous popularity Sattar won as the BNP's candidate. President Sattar sought to follow the policies of his predecessor and retained essentially the same cabinet.

=== 1982–1990: Hussain Mohammad Ershad ===
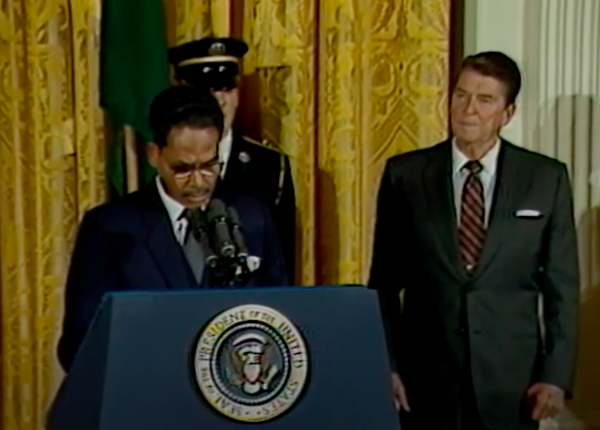
President HM Ershad with US President Ronald Reagan

Chief of Army Staff Lt. Gen. Hussain Mohammad Ershad assumed power in a full-fledged but bloodless coup on 24 March 1982. He removed the country's democratically elected president and suspended the constitution and declared martial law. He cited pervasive corruption, ineffectual government, and economic mismanagement for legitimising his action. The following year, Ershad assumed the presidency on 11 December 1983, retaining his positions as army chief and CMLA, for the first time in Bangladesh. During most of 1984, Ershad sought the opposition parties' participation in local elections under martial law. The opposition's refusal to participate, however, forced Ershad to abandon these plans. Ershad was capable of managing the Awami League through financial and political support. The Awami League's support gave him the strength and legitimacy to seek public support for his regime in a national referendum on his leadership in March 1985. He won overwhelmingly, although turnout was small. Two months later, Ershad held elections for local council chairmen. Pro-government candidates won a majority of the posts, setting in motion the President's ambitious decentralization program that Ziaur Rahman had initiated. Political life was finally liberalized in early 1986, and additional political rights, including the right to hold large public rallies, were restored. Additional support from Jamaat-e-Islami at the same time gave Ershad's political vehicle for the transition from martial law some form of legitimacy and the political order of Ershad and his Jatiya Party was established.

Despite a boycott by the BNP, led by Begum Khaleda Zia, parliamentary elections were held on 7 May 1986. The Jatiya Party won a modest majority of the 300 elected seats in the national assembly. The participation of the Awami League led by party chairman Sheikh Hasina Wazed—lent the elections some credibility, despite widespread charges of voting irregularities and ballot box theft.

Ershad resigned as Army Chief of Staff and retired from military service in preparation for the presidential elections, scheduled for October 1986. Protesting that martial law was still in effect, the BNP refused to put up opposing candidates. The Awami League participated by breaking their open public promise. Ershad easily outdistanced the remaining candidates, taking 84% of the vote. Although Ershad's government claimed a turnout of more than 50%, opposition leaders of BNP, and much of the foreign press, estimated a far lower percentage and alleged voting irregularities.

Ershad continued his stated commitment to lift martial law. In November 1986, his government mustered the necessary two-thirds majority in the national assembly to amend the constitution and confirm the previous actions of the martial law regime. The President then lifted martial law, and the opposition party Awami League of Hasina Wazed took their elected seats in the national assembly.

In July 1987, however, after the government hastily pushed through a controversial legislative bill to include military representation on local administrative councils. Passage of the bill helped spark an opposition movement by Bangladesh Nationalist Party that quickly gathered momentum. The Awami League and Jamaat-e-Islami, understanding their political gamble, gradually united with Bangladesh Nationalist Party for the first time. The government began to arrest scores of opposition activists under the country's "Special Powers Act" of 1974. Despite these arrests, opposition parties continued to organize protest marches and nationwide strikes. After declaring a state of emergency, Ershad dissolved Parliament and scheduled fresh elections for March 1988.

All major opposition parties refused government overtures to participate in these polls, maintaining that the government was illegal and incapable of holding free and fair elections. Despite the opposition boycott, the government proceeded. The ruling Jatiya Party won 251 of the 300 seats. The Parliament, while still regarded by the opposition as an illegitimate body, held its sessions as scheduled, and passed numerous bills.

By 1989, the domestic political situation in the country seemed to have quieted. The local council elections were generally considered by international observers to have been less violent and more free and fair than previous elections. However, opposition to Ershad's rule began to regain momentum, escalating by the end of 1990 in frequent general strikes, increased student's campus protests, public rallies, and a general disintegration of law and order. This was popularly termed the 1990 Mass Uprising.

On 6 December 1990, after 2 months of widespread civil unrest, Ershad offered his resignation. On 27 February 1991, an interim government oversaw what most observers widely believed to be the nation's most free and fair elections to date.

=== 1991–1996: Khaleda Zia ===
The center-right BNP won a plurality of seats in the 1991 Bangladeshi general election and formed a coalition government with the Islamic party Jamaat-e-Islami Bangladesh, with Khaleda Zia, widow of Ziaur Rahman, obtaining the post of prime minister. Only four parties had more than 10 members elected to the 1991 Parliament: The Bangladesh Nationalist Party, led by Prime Minister Khaleda Zia; the Awami League, led by Sheikh Hasina; the Jamaat-e-Islami (JI), led by Ghulam Azam; and the Jatiya Party (JP), led by acting chairman Mizanur Rahman Chowdhury while its founder, former President Ershad, served out a prison sentence on corruption charges. The electorate approved still more changes to the constitution, formally re-creating a parliamentary system and returning governing power to the office of the prime minister, as in Bangladesh's original 1972 constitution. In October 1991, members of Parliament elected a new head of state, President Abdur Rahman Biswas.

In March 1994, controversy over a parliamentary by-election, which the opposition claimed the government had rigged, led to an indefinite boycott of Parliament by the entire opposition. The opposition also began a program of repeated general strikes to press its demand that Khaleda Zia's government resign and a caretaker government supervise a general election. Efforts to mediate the dispute, under the auspices of the Commonwealth Secretariat, failed. After another attempt at a negotiated settlement failed narrowly in late December 1994, the opposition resigned en masse from Parliament. The opposition then continued a campaign of Marches, demonstrations, and strikes in an effort to force the government to resign. The year 1995 observed nearly 200 days of general strikes disrupting the countries normal activities. The opposition, including the Awami League's Sheikh Hasina, pledged to boycott national elections scheduled for 15 February 1996.

In February, Khaleda Zia was re-elected for the second term by a landslide in voting boycotted and denounced as unfair by the three main opposition parties. In March 1996, following escalating political turmoil, the sitting Parliament enacted a constitutional amendment to allow a neutral caretaker government to assume power conduct new parliamentary elections; former Chief Justice Muhammad Habibur Rahman was named Chief Advisor (a position equivalent to prime minister) in the interim government. New parliamentary elections were held in June 1996, and were won by the Awami League; party leader Sheikh Hasina became prime minister.

=== 1996–2001: Sheikh Hasina ===
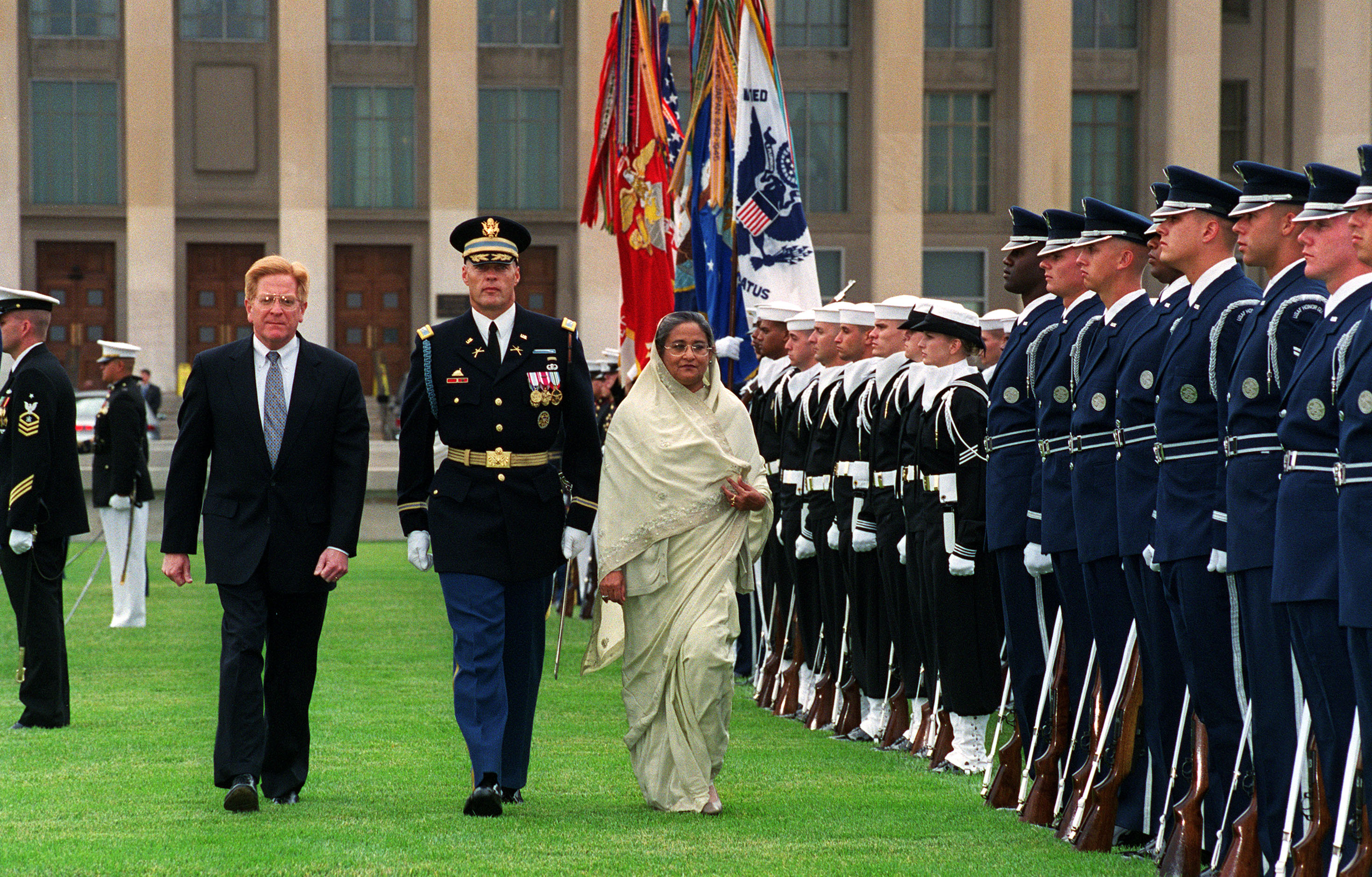
Prime Minister Sheikh Hasina inspects the ceremonial honour guard during a full honour arrival ceremony at the Pentagon on 17 October 2000.

Sheikh Hasina formed what she called a "Government of National Consensus" in June 1996, which included one minister from the Jatiya Party and another from the Jatiyo Samajtantrik Dal, a very small leftist party. The Jatiya Party never entered into a formal coalition arrangement, and party president H.M. Ershad withdrew his support from the government in September 1997. Only three parties had more than 10 members elected to the 1996 Parliament: The Awami League, BNP, and Jatiya Party. Jatiya Party president, Ershad, was released from prison on bail in January 1997.

BNP staged a walkout from parliament in August 1997. The BNP returned to Parliament under another agreement in March 1998. In June 1999, the BNP and other opposition parties again began to abstain from attending Parliament. Opposition parties have staged an increasing number of nationwide general strikes, rising from 6 days of general strikes in 1997 to 27 days in 1999. A four-party opposition alliance formed at the beginning of 1999 announced that it would boycott parliamentary by-elections and local government elections unless the government took steps demanded by the opposition to ensure electoral fairness. The government did not take these steps, and the opposition has subsequently boycotted all elections, including municipal council elections in February 1999, several parliamentary by-elections, and the Chittagong city corporation elections in January 2000. The opposition demands that the Awami League government step down immediately to make way for a caretaker government to preside over parliamentary and local government. In March 2000, US President Bill Clinton became the first US president to visit Bangladesh. Hasina later stated that during the visit Clinton wanted to import gas from the Country, but she had to decline due to fear of scarcity of gas and for the welfare of the people as they were heavily dependent on gas.

=== 2001–2006: Khaleda Zia ===
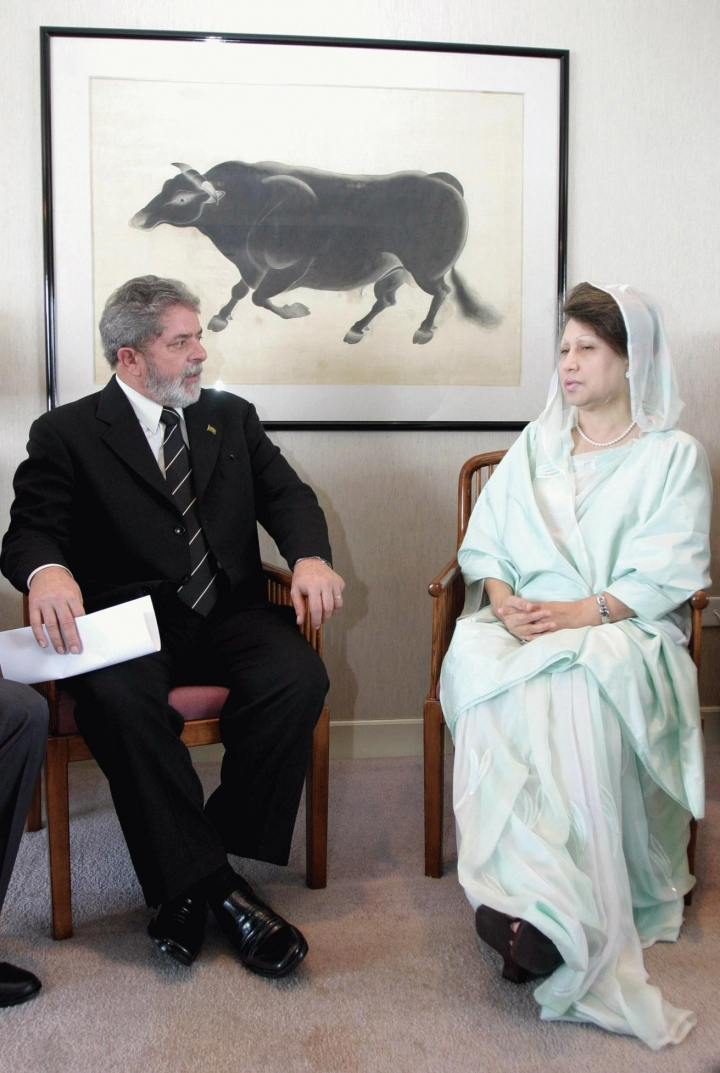
Prime Minister Khaleda Zia with the President of Brazil, Lula da Silva (2004)

A Khaleda-led four-party alliance won two-thirds of total parliamentary seats with a total 193 seats, while Awami League won 62 seats. Thus Khaleda Zia won a third term as prime minister in 2001. Her coalition included several Islamist parties. The Awami League walked out from the Parliament in June 2003 to protest derogatory remarks about Sheikh Hasina by a State Minister and the allegedly partisan role of the Parliamentary Speaker. Throughout the year 2004 the opposition party Awami League carried out various processions pressing various demands and claiming government incompetence on various issues. In June 2004, the Awami League returned to Parliament without having any of their demands met.

On 21 August 2004, a group of terrorists conducted vicious grenade attacks on a rally held by the opposition party Awami League including leader Sheikh Hasina. Prominent leaders including Ivy Rahman were killed in the attack, and Hasina herself sustained injuries to her ears. A total of 13 grenades were blasted and 24 people killed. The Awami League called for a nationwide hartal (general strikes) on 23 and 24 August 2004 following the incident. Begum Khaleda Zia, then Prime Minister of Bangladesh condemned the attacks, and also vowed a strong probe to catch the culprits. But no charge sheet was provided by the investigating departments. Only after the current government's tenure ended that a neutral probe was conducted and charge sheet was provided that included terrorist Mufti Hannan. Later, during Awami League tenure another probe formed and alleged that Tarique Rahman son of Prime Minister Khaleda Zia along with the then Home Minister Lutfuzzaman Babar had masterminded the attack. But BNP has denied the allegations.

In 2005, Awami League attended Parliament irregularly before announcing a boycott of the entire June 2005 budget session. This tenure was notable for economic growth and rise in Ready-made garment (RMG) sector through various governmeny initatives, that would become the driving force of Bangladesh's export earnings in the coming years. The BNP government tenure expired in October 2006, and was followed by a period of widespread political crisis.

=== 2006–2008: Caretaker government: Fakhruddin Ahmed ===
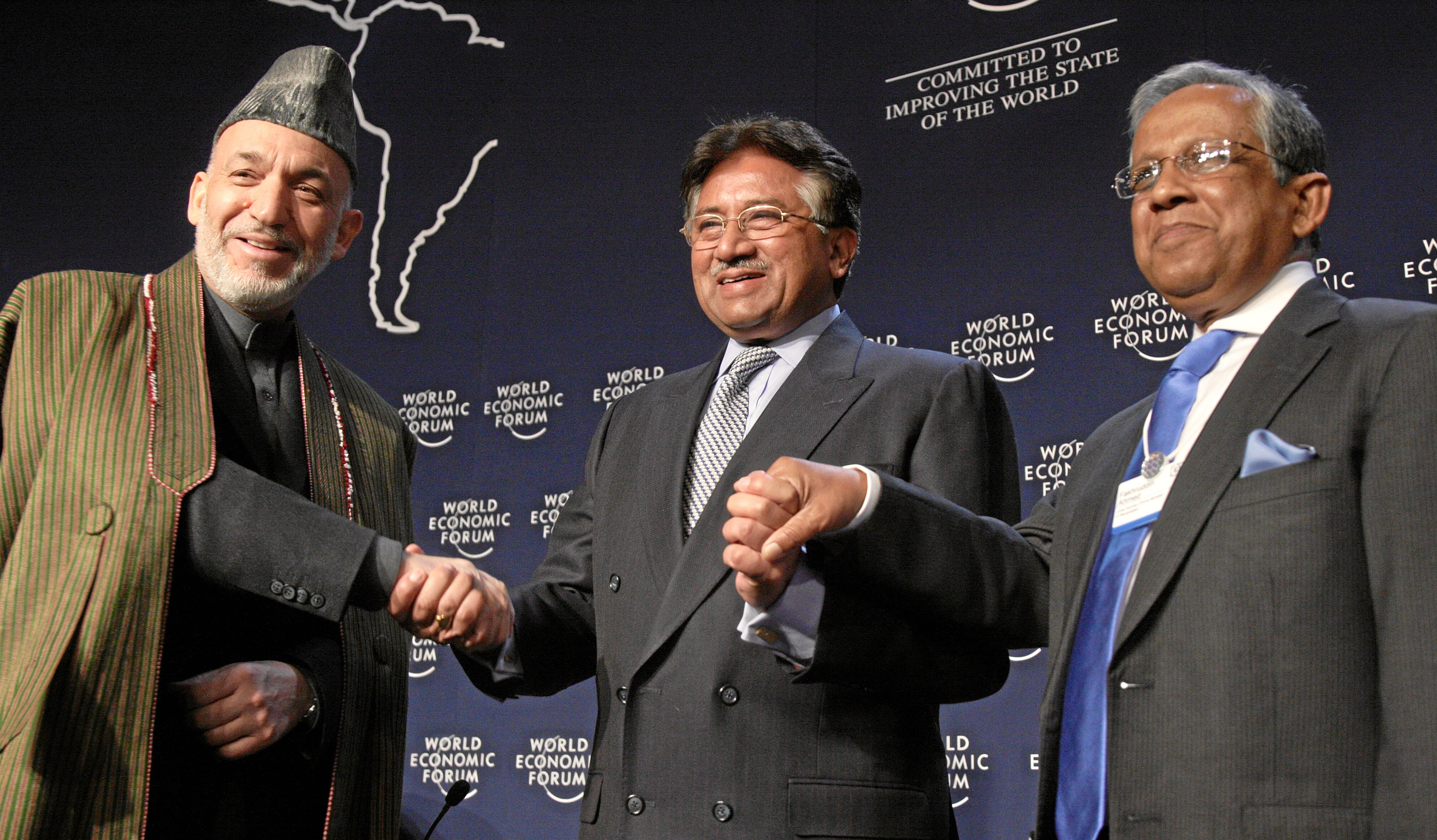
Hamid Karzai, Gen. Pervez Musharraf, and Dr. Fakhruddin Ahmed at the Annual Meeting 2008 of the World Economic Forum in Davos, Switzerland

Following the end of Khaleda Zia's government in late October 2006, there were rioting and arson attacks over uncertainty about who would head the caretaker government (which was accused of BNP bias), held by Awami League, paralyzing the country and resulting in the death of at least 40 people in the following month in November 2006. An election was scheduled for the beginning of 2007, however it did not take place. Given the parties' failure to agree on a candidate For Chief Advisor, according to the constitution the position devolved to the President, Iajuddin Ahmed, serving since 2002. He took it on in addition to his regular responsibilities, which under the caretaker government included the Defense Ministry. Iajuddin Ahmed formed a government, appointing ten advisors to a council to act as ministers. He appointed his press spokesman, the journalist-editor turned politician M Mukhlesur Rahman Chowdhury, as his chief Presidential Advisor, with the status of Minister of State. Chowdhury had the responsibility to negotiate with the political parties to bring them to participation in the election. In January 2007, Iajuddin Ahmed stepped down as the head of the caretaker government, under pressure from the military.

Fakhruddin Ahmed, former World Bank economist, was selected to replace him and with the commitment to rooting out corruption and preparing a better voter list. Fakhruddin Ahmed became the Chief Advisor. A State of Emergency was declared and a massive campaign to crack down on corruption was undertaken. By July 2007, some 200,000 people had been arrested under corruption charges. The government said it would hold elections before the end of 2008.

In April 2007, Ahmed's military backed administration attempted to reform the political parties by exiling Hasina and Zia, but this was never enforced. Hasina, who had been visiting her children in the US, was allowed to return but she had to face serious charges, including involvement in the assassination of four political rivals. In July, she was arrested after two businessmen testified that she had extorted ৳80 million (US$1.16 million) from them. This provoked angry protests from her supporters; even her bitter rival Khaleda Zia, as well as six British MPs and MEPs, called for her release. Khaleda herself faced charges of tax evasion and was later arrested. Tarique Rahman was taken to custody for the 2004 grenade attacks and various corruption charges including money laundering, and was later sent on forced exile on 11 September 2008 and since then has not been able to return to the country. After holding power for almost two years, the political situation had finally calmed and Ahmed decided to return parliamentary democracy, testing the political situation with some local elections held on 4 August 2008, which were peaceful. Both Hasina and Khaleda were finally released from prison and the General elections were held on 29 December 2008. The Awami League and its Grand Alliance won the elections with two-thirds of the seats in parliament. The BNP and its four-party alliance, including Jamaat-e-Islami, was the major opposition.

=== 2009–2024: Sheikh Hasina ===
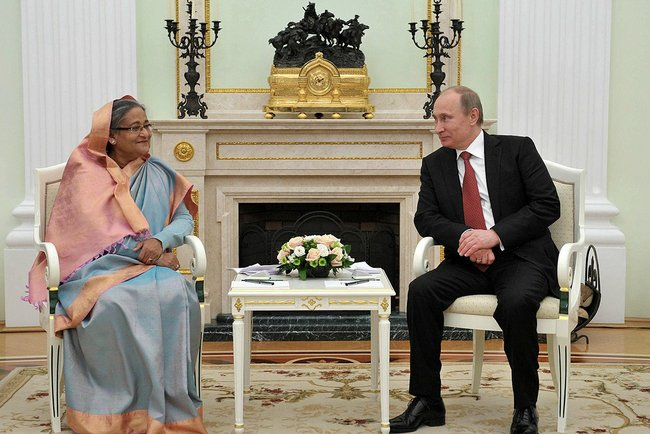
Sheikh Hasina with Vladimir Putin in Moscow (2013)

The Awami League came to power by winning the vast majority of parliament seats in the election held on 29 December 2008, and Sheikh Hasina became the Prime Minister of Bangladesh for the second time. Her cabinet took oath on 6 January 2009. HM Ershad was promised to be made President in exchange for support for Awami League, but despite supporting Awami League, this promise was not fulfilled and Zillur Rahman became president. Just over a month later the Bangladesh Rifles revolt took place. Over 57 valiant senior army officers were brutally murdered. Hasina's handling of the situation was harshly criticized. Years later it was exposed that Hasina herself masterminded the massacre. In 2010 the Awami League government enforced an existing law to reclaim the house where Khaleda Zia had lived for nearly 40 years for a nominal cost. Khaleda Zia moved to the house of her brother Sayeed Iskandar at Gulshan. In protest BNP would abstain from parliament. This period also observed tremendous economic growth.

Controversy erupted in 2011 after Prime Minister Sheikh Hasina declared the abolition of the care-taker government system, contradicting her own motives and views in the mid-1990s when she had demanded that elections should be held under neutral care-taker governments. Hasina justified this by stating that a neutral care-taker government may abuse its power (referring to the care-taker government crisis in 2006–2008) and take unlawful and autocratic control of the country. At the same time, arrests and trials of members accused of war crimes of the political party Jamaat-e-Islami had begun. This caused major disagreements among the ruling Awami League with the chief opposition party BNP and its major ally Jamaat. In a bid to return to the 1972 Constitution, the government made several reforms to the constitution of Bangladesh in 2011, and readopted Secularism. In 2012, a coup attempt against Hasina by mid-ranking army officers was stopped, with Bangladesh army being tipped off by Indian intelligence agency. Also in 2012, Bangladesh won a legal battle against Myanmar under international court regarding disputed sea territories, giving Bangladesh a tremendous advantage on the oceanic areas.

The period 2012-2014 was marked by widespread political unrest and violence in strikes and riots initiated by the opposition party. Petrol bombs were utilized for arson attacks by both sides. Members of both the ruling party and opposition party clashed throughout the whole nation resulting in injuries and deaths. Both the ruling party and the opposition received International criticism. The scheduled date of the 10th general election was 5 January 2014. The opposition party received several pleas by the ruling party to abandon their path of violence and join the election, but they repeatedly declined. Despite the crisis the controversial 5 January 2014 election was held with mass boycott from BNP and its major allies. At least 21 people were killed on the 5 January election day violence. Awami League had a landslide victory, and Sheikh Hasina was sworn in as prime minister for the third time on 9 January 2014, while Rowshan Ershad of the Jatiya Party became the new leader of the opposition, as Khaleda-led BNP boycotted the election. The ongoing BNP-Jamaat protests diluted after failing to stop the January 2014 election, and overthrow the ruling party, and by the end of March 2014, political stability was reached.

In the tenth general election, Sheikh Hasina won a controversial one-sided walkover election after her main rival Khaleda Zia and all other opposition parties boycotted the polls. Awami League once again took office on 9 January 2014. Over 100 people were killed in the 2016 Union Parishad Election in violent clashes between Awami League and BNP supporters. In April 2017 Prime Minister Sheikh Hasina made a landmark visit to neighboring India and signed 22 new deals and MoUs with India taking the Indo-BD bilateral relationships to a new height. This also included a defense cooperation, originally proposed by India. BNP harshly criticized the move with Khaleda alleging the ruling party was selling Bangladesh to India and pointing the Government's failure to make the long-awaited Teesta deal. Awami League dismissed the allegations, assuring that it was just a framework to strengthen regional ties with India. Also in 2017 Bangladesh was met with the 2017 Rohingya Refugee Crisis, in which the government received international praise for allowing over 700,000 Rohingya refugees fleeing violence in Myanmar (where around 20,000 of them were killed) into the country but also some domestic criticisms due to this being an additional burden to Bangladesh a country already overpopulated with 17 crore (170 million) people and having a small land.

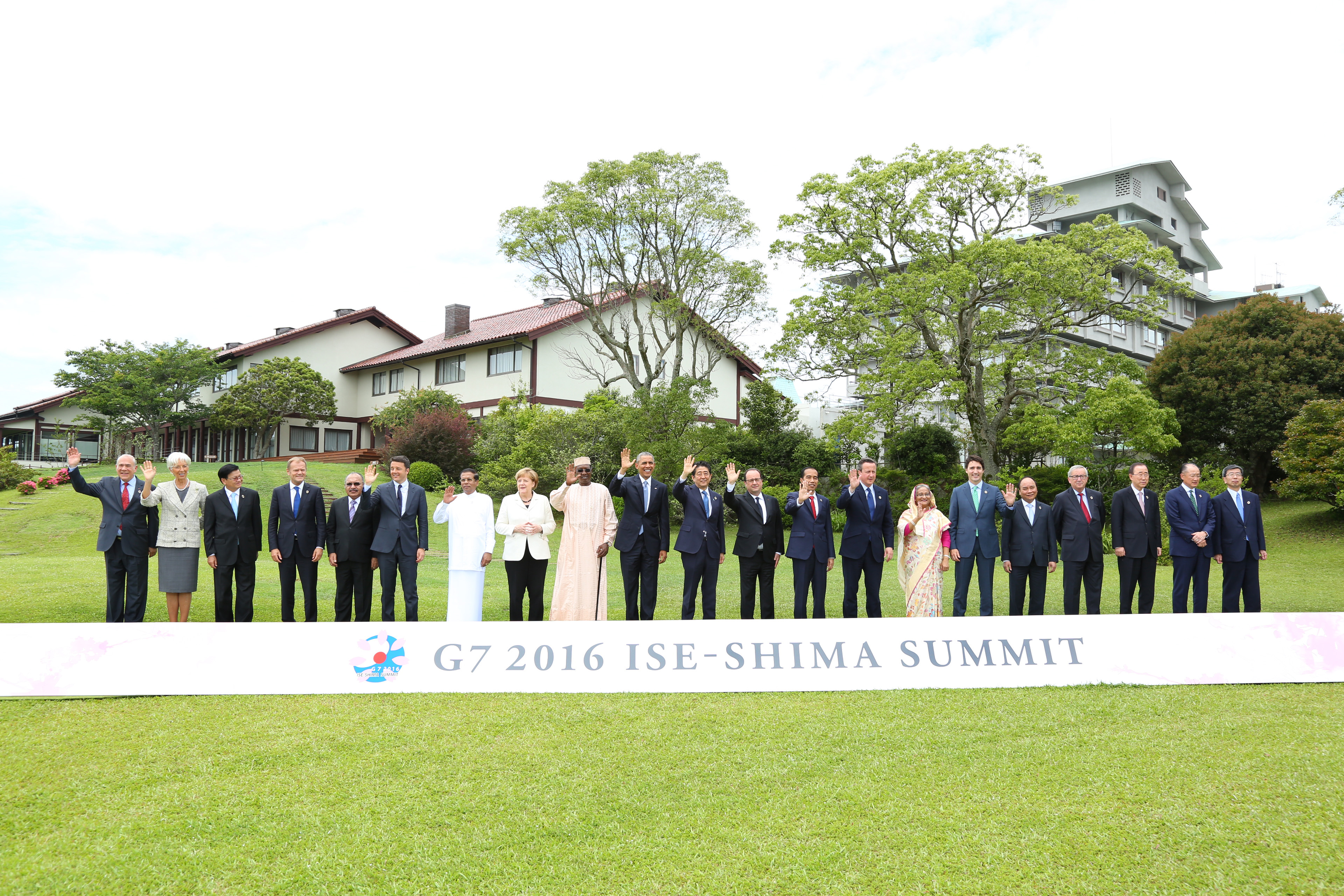
Hasina with G7 Leaders and guests, Shima Kanko Hotel in Japan, 2016

Most of the post 2014 election period however saw political calm. Tensions between the BNP and Awami League reignited in 2018 after BNP once again started pressing demands for a neutral caretaker government to observe the 11th general election. BNP also criticized Awami League's rising dependency on law enforcement agencies such as the police force and for holding back people's freedom of speech. On 8 February 2018 Khaleda Zia and Tarique Rahman as per court verdict, were jailed for 5 and 10 years respectively due to their involvement in the Zia Charitable Trust corruption case. While Tarique was on exile, Khaleda would be imprisoned on old Dhaka Central Jail located in Nazimuddin Road. BNP totally rejected the verdict, alleging that it was Awami League's conspiracy to destroy their party and to keep them out of the next general election. In protest BNP held nationwide demonstrations, which were foiled by the well prepared police force across the nation, with a large number of BNP members also being arrested during clashes with the police. After Khaleda Zia was jailed, BNP Secretary General Mirza Fakhrul Islam Alamgir and prominent leader Ruhul Kabir Rizvi oversaw most of the party's activities. After Khalada Zia's prison sentence was challenged at the High Court, it was increased to 10 years, potentially ending her political career. During this time the government passed the controversial "Digital Security Act 2018", under which any criticisms of the government over the internet or any other media, would be met with various degrees of prison terms.

On 22 September 2018, in a massive rally, the newly formed coalition party: Jatiya Oikya Prokriya (JOP), a platform led by Dr. Kamal Hossain and Prof. Badruddoza Chowdhury, allied themselves with the main opposition party BNP, on condition BNP will no longer be alliance with Jamaat, and vowed joint movements to restore democracy. The BNP-JOP alliance was named the Jatiya Oikya Front. The Awami League General Secretary Obaidul Quader called the opposing Jatiya Oikya Front, weak and stated that the opposing alliance was not being viewed as a credible threat by the Government. On 10 October 2018, court verdict against the 2004 grenade attack was given. Top BNP leader Lutfuzzaman Babar was given the death penalty and Tariqe Rahman was given life term imprisonment. BNP rejected the verdict and carried out protests against it. During this time, Kamal Hossain as the leader of the Jatiya Oikya Front became the main opposition leader.

The 2018 Bangladeshi general election was held on 30 December 2018. On the election day at least 14 people died in violence between the Awami League supporters and the Jatiya Oikya Front supporters. The Awami League returned to power winning 259 out of 300 parliamentary seats, making up the largest government body in Bangladesh after 1973 (where Awami League had won 293 out of 300 seats). The Jatiya Oikya Front only won 7 seats and alleged the 2018 election to be rigged and opted to boycott the parliament and stated that they would demand for fresh elections. The Jatiya Party became the main opposition party with only 20 seats.

Bangladesh Awami League leader Sheikh Hasina's new cabinet took oath on 3 January 2019. Despite refusing to sell gas (LPG) at a better deal to the US back in 2000, in October 2019 Sheikh Hasina in a contradictory statement controversially stated that she will sell LPG to India despite the scarcity of LPG in Bangladesh (BD). Hasina also stated she will give India free access to extract BD's Feni water, despite her failure to secure the Teesta river sharing deal. The dispute between Bangladesh and Myanmar over the unresolved Rohingya Refugee Crisis continued during this period, with Myanmar's unwillingness to take back the refugees. In October 2020 Myanmar deployed their army troops on the Bangladesh border. Bangladesh appealed to the UN Security Council to prevent any escalation. Later Prime Minister Sheikh Hasina assured "a safe zone must be created for the Rohingyas Refugees. If that is done, Myanmar will face a huge problem in the Rakhine region. I don't think Myanmar will lock in war with Bangladesh; China will not let that happen." No further escalations have been reported, Bangladesh and Myanmar have since remained in peace militarily, but the diplomatic dispute continues to be debated at the UN.

Since the 2018 General Election the nation witnessed four years of political silence due to strict policing.During this time corruption remained rampant. The Awami League government allowed Politicians, Government Officials and Businessmen to smuugle billions of taka out of the country to Canada, particularly Begum Para, Toronto. In 2022 BNP and Jamaat-e-Islami Bangladesh after temporarily renewing their alliance, increasingly started to criticize the Awami League Government over rising inflationary crisis and corruption, including unsustainable fuel and energy price hikes as well as massive power outage despite the Government's promise to implement 100% electricity in the nation. While price levels of every items especially food, begun to rise, people's income level became stale and the Prime Minister herself warned of possible famine in the future and called for the general public to reduce their consumption, however did not say anything about politicians, businessmen and government officials living luxurious lives and causing flight of capital abroad which included the Begum Para Scandal. This cumulated to BNP and Jamaat-e-Islami Bangladesh staging massive protests on 24 December 2022, during clashes with the police one BNP activist was killed in Panchagarh. Due to strict policing the protests ended prematurely. On 1 January 2024 the government came under international controversy and criticism after their involvement in Nobel laureate Muhammad Yunus being convicted under labor law that was allegedly a false case.

Unlike the 2014 and 2018 general elections which were marred by violence, the 2024 Bangladeshi general election held on 7 January 2024 were generally peaceful and once again won by Awami League, although record low voter turnout was noted. The Awami League Government led by Prime Minister Sheikh Hasina took oath for a record fourth consecutive time on 10 January 2024. The election was boycotted by both Bangladesh Nationalist Party and Jamaat-e-Islami Bangladesh. Due to increasing authoritarianism and corruption by the Government, Bangladesh was grappled by large scale protests led by ordinary students and later joined by ordinary people in July and August 2024 namely the July Uprising and protests were met by brutal resistance under Government order, that resulted in the death of over a thousand people across the whole country and the eventual resignation of the Prime Minister Sheikh Hasina and the Awami League government on 5 August 2024, and Sheikh Hasina subsequently fled to India on the same day.

=== 2024–2026: Interim government: Muhammad Yunus ===
On 5 August 2024, following the fall of the previous government, the Army Chief Waker-uz-Zaman addressed the whole nation at 4 PM on the same day assuring the formation of an interim government within a few days. The interim government headed by Nobel laureate Muhammad Yunus as Chief Advisor was formed on 8 August 2024 through his oath of office.

Law adviser Asif Nazrul stated that the thirteenth general election may be possible by 2025. However he was contradicted by Religious Affairs Adviser AFM Khalid Hossain who said the date for the next general election has not yet been decided by the Interim government. In January 2025 the Interim government came under criticism for increasing VAT on numerous essential commodities amidst the country's existing uncontrolled inflationary crisis. On 28 February a new political party named National Citizen Party was formed by the leaders of the July Uprising.

Clashes in Gopalganj between Bangladeshi security forces and Awami League supporters on 16 July 2025 resulted in at least four deaths and numerous injuries after the National Citizen Party rally was attacked by Awami League supporters who deemed the rally provocative.

On 5 August 2025 Chief Adviser Muhammad Yunus formally read out the July Declaration a year after the uprising ended. On the same day he scheduled July Charter and the next general election to be held in February 2026. On 13 November 2025 Awami League supporters carry mass arson attacks throughout the nation killing people and vandalizing vehicles. They were however thwarted by the law enforcement and students. During this time both BNP and Jamaat grew stronger but drifted apart and by November 2025 the two parties begun engaging in major confrontations against each other.

On 30 November 2025 new details emerged regarding the 2009 Bangladesh Rifles revolt. On 23 December 2024, the Ministry of Home Affairs haf formed a seven-member commission to re-investigate the BDR mutiny, which released its findings on 30 November 2025 concluding that the incident was a planned operation rather than a spontaneous revolt. The report alleged involvement of senior Awami League figures, including Sheikh Fazle Noor Taposh and Sheikh Hasina, and noted evidence destruction and missing key individuals in the original probe. This was done to destabilize Bangladesh Army and strengthen India's influence over Bangladesh. The commission also cited evidence destruction and missing key individuals during the original probe. That same day, the commission's chief stated that 921 Indian nationals had entered Bangladesh around the time of the incident, with 67 remaining unaccounted for.

=== 2026–Present: Tarique Rahman ===
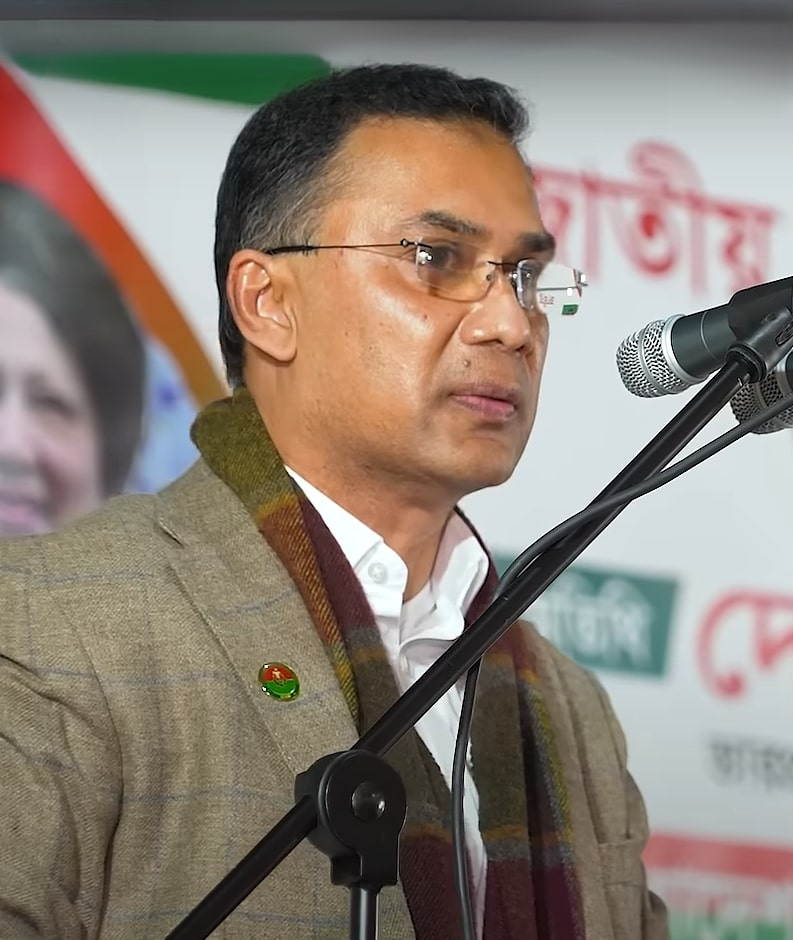
Tarique Rahman, Chairman of the Bangladesh Nationalist Party in a political rally in 2021.

Tarique Rahman the son of the former President Ziaur Rahman and former Prime Minister Khaleda Zia became Chairman of the Bangladesh Nationalist Party commonly referred to as "BNP" in January 2026. His party, the Bangladesh Nationalist Party, won the 2026 Bangladeshi general election. Tarique Rahman was sworn in as Prime Minister on 17 February 2026 along with other Ministers of the BNP Government ushering a new era in the country. Bangladesh Jamaat-e-Islami became the main opposition party.

In July 2026 Bangladesh President Mohammed Shahabuddin was accused of contacting senior members of the exiled Awami League to conspire against the BNP government causing national outrage. Amid calls for his resignation, he has resigned due to health reasons. In August 2026 Mirza Fakhrul Islam Alamgir was elected and sworn in as the new President.

== See also ==
- Government of Bangladesh
- List of office-holders in the Government of Bangladesh
- Cabinet of Bangladesh
- Censorship in Bangladesh
- Poverty in Bangladesh
