= Syed Ferhat Anwar =

Bangladeshi academic

Prof. Dr. Syed Ferhat Anwar
- সৈয়দ ফারহাত আনোয়ার

Vice-Chancellor of BRAC University
- Incumbent
- Assumed office 11 September 2024
- Chancellor: Mohammed Shahabuddin; Hafiz Uddin Ahmad (acting); Mirza Fakhrul Islam Alamgir
- Preceded by: Vincent Chang

Personal details
- Education: PhD (Marketing Systems)
- Alma mater: University of New Brunswick

Syed Ferhat Anwar is a Bangladeshi educationist and academic. He is a vice chancellor of BRAC University. He is the former director of the Institute of Business Administration (IBA) at Dhaka University (DU). And pro vice chancellor of East West University. He is the chairman of the reformed National Bank Limited, and he is a Director of Singer Bangladesh and Meghna Bank PLC. He is a board of the member of Banglalink. He is the president of the Asia Marketing Federation. He is also the Founding Director of the Kotler Center for Marketing Excellence and a Chief Advisor of Bangladesh Brand Forum.
