= Gazi Shamsur Rahman =

Bangladeshi lawyer and writer

- গাজী শামছুর রহমান

President of Bangla Academy
- In office 28 May 1994 – 27 May 1996
- Preceded by: Abdur Rahman Chowdhury
- Succeeded by: Shamsur Rahman
- In office 14 November 1990 – 13 November 1992
- Preceded by: Abdullah-Al-Muti
- Succeeded by: Abdur Rahman Chowdhury

Personal details
- Born: 1921 Khulna, Bengal Presidency, British India
- Died: 12 August 1998 (aged 76–77)
- Spouse: Jamal Ara Rahman
- Children: Ainun Nishat
- Education: Aligarh Muslim University

Gazi Shamsur Rahman (c. 1921 – 12 August 1998) was a Bangladeshi lawyer, writer, translator, columnist and television personality. He was awarded Ekushey Padak in 1985 and Bangla Academy Literary Award in 1983 by the Government of Bangladesh. He wrote over 77 books on law and language in English and Bengali language.

== Education and career ==
Rahman completed his MA and LLB from Aligarh Muslim University. He started his career as a district judge and retired as an additional secretary at the ministry of law of the Government of Bangladesh.

Rahman served as the chairperson of Bangladesh Press Institute and Bangla Academy for two terms during 1990–1992 and 1994–1996.

== Marriage and family ==
Rahman was married to Zamal Ara Rahman (d. 2016), a graduate from Lady Brabourne College in Kolkata. Together they had three daughters and two sons, including Munjiba Shams, Professor at GonoSSVMedicalCollege and Ainun Nishat, a water resource specialist in Bangladesh.
