= Jamilur Reza Choudhury =

Bangladeshi civil engineer (1942–2020)

- জামিলুর রেজা চৌধুরী
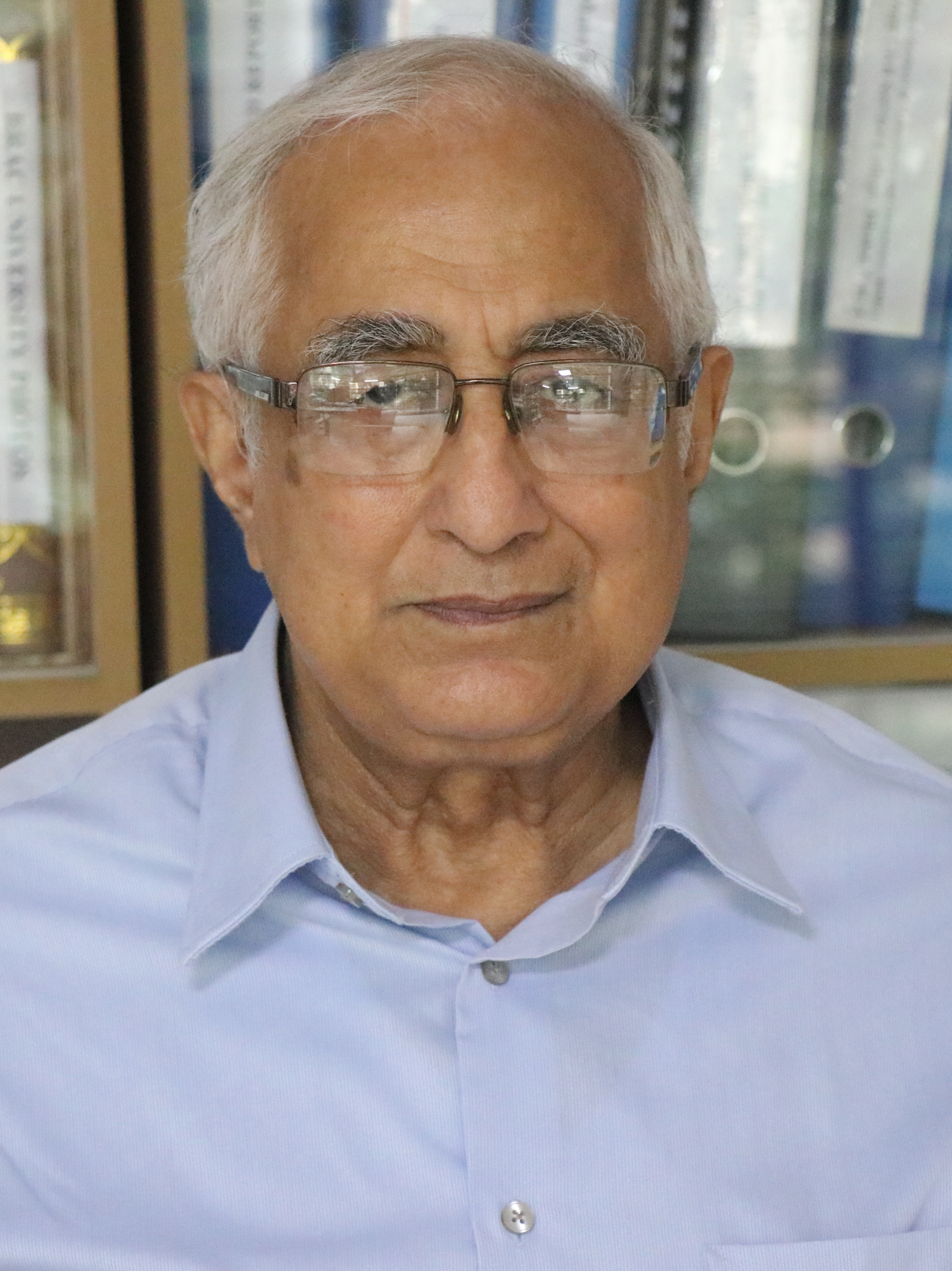
- Choudhury in 2018

Vice-Chancellor of University of Asia Pacific
- In office 2 May 2012 – 28 April 2020
- Preceded by: Abdul Matin Patwari
- Succeeded by: Md. Sultan Mahmud

Vice-Chancellor of BRAC University
- In office 2001–2010
- Chancellor: A. Q. M. Badruddoza Chowdhury; Muhammad Jamiruddin Sircar (acting); Iajuddin Ahmed; Zillur Rahman
- Preceded by: Position established
- Succeeded by: Ainun Nishat

Personal details
- Born: 15 November 1943 Sylhet, Assam Province, British India
- Died: 28 April 2020 (aged 76) Dhaka, Bangladesh
- Education: Dhaka College; Bangladesh University of Engineering and Technology; University of Southampton
- Known for: Academics, research, civil engineering, former adviser to Caretaker Government of Bangladesh

Dr. Jamilur Reza Choudhury (15 November 1942 – 28 April 2020) was a Bangladeshi civil engineer, professor, researcher, and education advocate. He was an Adviser (Minister) to Caretaker Government of Bangladesh (April–June 1996). He was the first vice chancellor of BRAC University and former vice chancellor of University of Asia Pacific. He was also the president of Bangladesh Mathematical Olympiad Committee from 2003. He was awarded Ekushey Padak by the Government of Bangladesh in the category of science and technology in 2017. He was inducted as a National Professor by the Government of Bangladesh in 2018.

== Early life and background ==
Choudhury was born in Sylhet (during British colonial rule) on 15 November 1943. His father, Abid Reza Choudhury (1905–1991), was a civil engineer who had migrated to Dhaka in 1952 (after the Partition of India) from Rangauty, a rural area of Hailakandi (Assam, India). Abid was the first Muslim to graduate from Bengal Engineering and Science University, in 1929. His mother, Hayatun Nessa Choudhury (née Laskor) (1922–2010) was a homemaker, from the Nitainagar area of Hailakandi. Jamilur is the middle child of five siblings.

== Education ==
Choudhury began school in 1950 (age 6) at the Mymensingh Zilla School. After his family moved to Dhaka from Mymensingh in 1952, he transferred to Nawabpur Government High School, and transferred once more to a private Catholic school, St Gregory's High School, in 1953. He passed entrance examination from Sylhet Government Pilot High School. He attended Dhaka College from 1957 to 1959 and earned his Bachelor of Science Degree (Civil Engineering) from Bangladesh University of Engineering and Technology (BUET) in 1963. Upon graduation from BUET (First Class First with Honours), he became a lecturer in the Civil Engineering Department that same year. He earned a Masters of Science in Engineering Degree (advanced structural engineering) in 1965 and a Ph.D. in structural engineering in 1968, both at University of Southampton.

Choudhury was awarded the honorary degree of Doctor of Engineering (Honoris Causa) by Manchester University on 20 October 2010 – the first person of Bangladeshi origin to receive this honor from a British University.

== Work ==
Immediately after publication of results of BSC Engineering, he joined as a faculty member of the former East Pakistan University of Engineering and Technology (EPUET) pending formal appointment. In November 1963, he formally joined as a lecturer the Department of Civil Engineering and began his long teaching career. In September 1964 he was awarded a scholarship by Burmashell to pursue MS in structural engineering. His thesis was on "Cracks in Concrete Beam using Computer-Aided Design". In 1968, he was conferred a Ph.D. degree on the topic of "Shear Wall & Structural Analysis of High rise Building". After completing Ph.D. he returned to former East Pakistan in 1968 and joined the former East Pakistan University of Engineering & Technology as an assistant professor until the demise of East Pakistan and the birth of a new nation, Bangladesh. In 1973 he was promoted to associate professor of Bangladesh University of Engineering & Technology (BUET) and in 1976 a full professor. In 1975, he was offered a Nuffield scholarship to pursue a post-doctoral Fellowship at Surrey University in the UK. Until 2001 he was working as a professor at BUET. He was also entrusted with developing a "Computer Center" at BUET and was appointed the director for about 10 years. He served as vice-chancellor of BRAC University between 2001 and 2010. Choudhury was appointed the chairman of the task force for developing Software Export & IT Infrastructure in Bangladesh from 1997 to 2000 under the Ministry of Commerce. He was a ranking member of the Prime Minister's Task Force on developing Digital Bangladesh. Besides he was involved with several local and international organizations. He was working as the vice-chancellor of the University of Asia Pacific (UAP). He was the Technical Adviser of Padma Bridge.

== Awards ==
- Ekushey Padak (2017)
- Sheltech Award (2010)
- Bangladesh Engineering Institution Gold medal (1998)
- Dr. Rashid Gold medal, (1997)
- Rotary Seed Award, (2000)
- Lions International (District-315) Gold Medal
- Received an honorary doctorate degree from the University of Manchester. He is the only Bangladeshi, who received a doctorate degree in engineering from a British university.
- Jica Recognition Award
- Star Lifetime Award (2016)
- Order of the Rising Sun, 3rd Class, Gold Rays with Neck Ribbon (2018)

== Death ==
Choudhury died on 28 April 2020 following a heart attack in his home in Dhanmondi, Dhaka, Bangladesh.
