= Syed Mahfuzul Aziz =

Pro-vice chancellor of BRAC University

Syed Mahfuzul Aziz is the pro-vice chancellor and the acting vice-chancellor of BRAC University. He is a professor of the School of Engineering at the University of South Australia.

== Early life ==
Mahfuzul Aziz did his bachelor's and master's in Electrical and Electronic Engineering at the Bangladesh University of Engineering and Technology. He did his PhD at the University of Kent in Electronic Engineering.

== Career ==
From 1985 to 1986, Mahfuzul Aziz worked at the Bangladesh Atomic Energy Commission. He joined the Bangladesh University of Engineering and Technology as a lecturer in 1986. After his PhD he developed microchip design teaching in Bangladesh. He founded the Computer Aided Design lab in Bangladesh University of Engineering and Technology. In 1996, he was a visiting faculty at the University of Texas at Austin. In 1999, he took leave and joined the Computer Systems Engineering department at the University of South Australia.

In January 2002, Mahfuzul Aziz resigned from Bangladesh University of Engineering and Technology. In 2006, he was a visiting professor at the Institut national des sciences appliquées de Toulouse. From 2007 to 2012, Mahfuzul Aziz was the academic director of the common first year engineering program at the University of South Australia. From 2013 to 2015, he was the discipline leader of the Department of Electrical and Electronic Engineering at the University of South Australia. He was appointed the acting dean in 2015. In 2017, he was a visiting professor at the University College London.

From 2018 to 2021, Mahfuzul Aziz was a member of the Australian national teaching awards committee. In 2009, he received the Prime Minister's Award for Australian University Teacher of the Year. He is a member of Engineers Australia.

Mahfuzul Aziz was appointed pro-vice chancellor of BRAC University and acting vice-chancellor of the university in February 2023.
