= Vincent Chang (academic) =

- 張化成
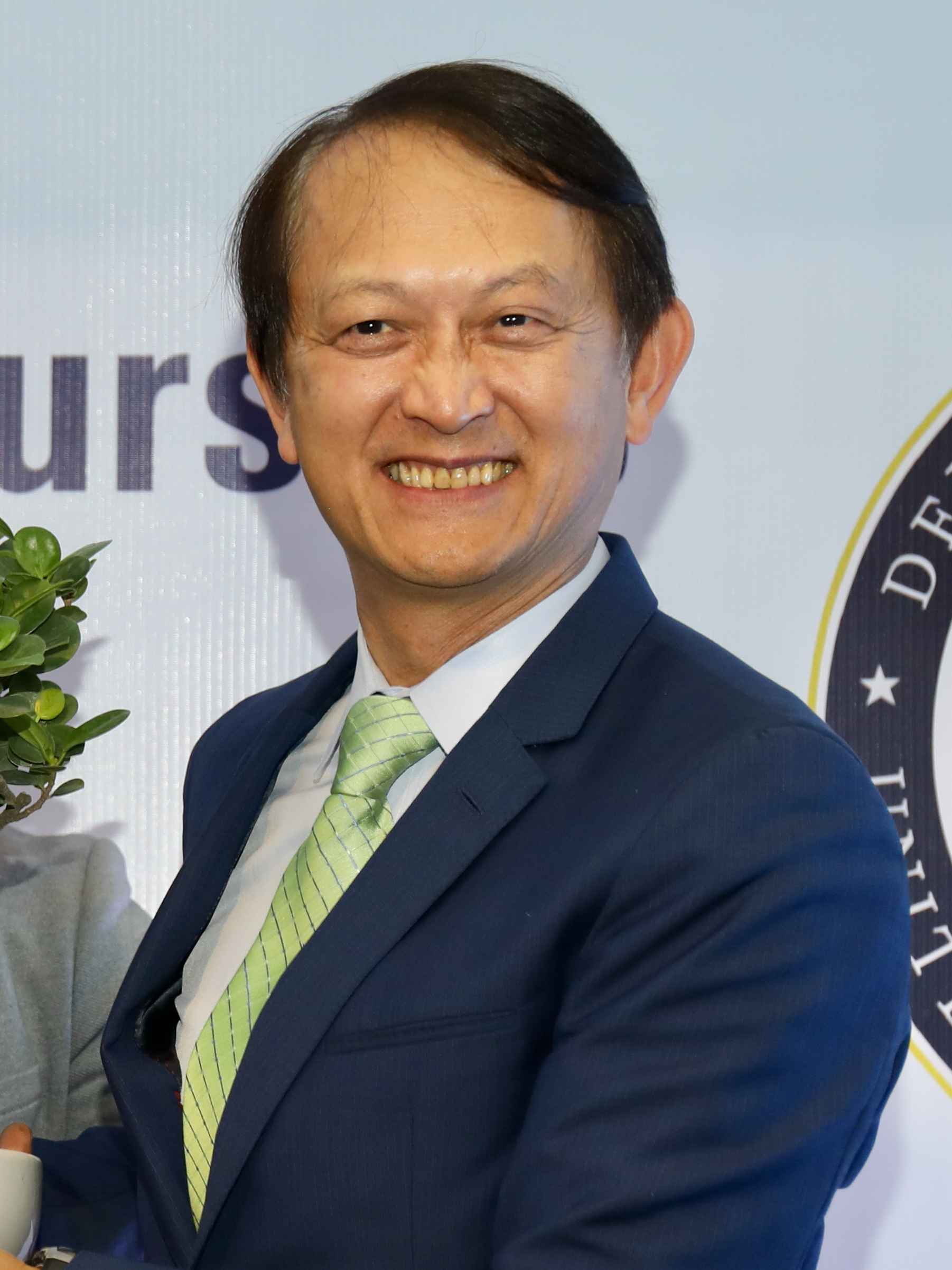
- Chang in 2022

Vice-Chancellor of BRAC University
- In office February 2019 – 24 January 2023
- Chancellor: Mohammad Abdul Hamid
- Preceded by: Syed Saad Andaleeb
- Succeeded by: Syed Ferhat Anwar

Personal details
- Education: National Taiwan University (BS, MS); University of California, Berkeley (PhD); Yale University (MBA); Harvard University (MPA); Massachusetts Institute of Technology (PhD)
- Scientific career
- Fields: Electrical engineering, computer science, economics
- Theses: Penetration of a Focused Electromagnetic Pulse into Biological Material and Its Application to Hyperthermia (1990); Of Energy and the Economy (2007)
- Doctoral advisor: Kenneth K. Mei (Berkeley); Jerry A. Hausman (MIT)

Chang Hua-Cheng (Chinese: 張化成), also known by his English name Vincent Chang, is a Taiwanese electrical engineer, computer scientist, and economist who was the vice-chancellor of BRAC University from 2019 to 2023.

== Early life and education ==
Chang was born in Taiwan as the eldest son of a traditional Chinese family. His father was a fisherman and he was raised in a poor fishing village.

Chang graduated from National Taiwan University with a bachelor's degree and master's degree in electrical engineering. He then completed graduate studies in the United States in multiple fields. In 1990, he earned a Ph.D. in electrical engineering and computer science from the University of California, Berkeley, where he was mentored by Janet Yellen. His doctoral dissertation was titled, "Penetration of a Focused Electromagnetic Pulse into Biological Material and Its Application to Hyperthermia," and was supervised by professor Kenneth K. Mei.

After receiving his doctorate from Berkeley, Chang studied business at Yale University, where he completed a Master of Business Administration (M.B.A.) at the Yale School of Management, and then studied public policy at Harvard University, where he earned a Master of Public Administration (M.P.A.) from the Harvard Kennedy School. He briefly began doctoral studies in astrophysics at Princeton University. In 2007, Chang earned a second Ph.D. in economics from the Massachusetts Institute of Technology under economists Jerry A. Hausman and Ernst Berndt. His second doctoral thesis was titled, "Of Energy and the Economy: Theory and Evidence for Their Functional Relationship."

== Career ==
=== Pre-academia ===
Chang's pre-academia experiences, mainly in the US, included medical imaging, energy, investment, marketing and consulting, with start-up firms as well as JP Morgan, McKinsey, ExxonMobil and the US Federal Reserve.

=== Academic career ===
Chang served as Executive Dean of Peking University HSBC Business School, established as China's first all-English International Business School. He was the Founding President and Planning Director of the University of Business and Technology in Oman (academically affiliated with Virginia Tech in the US), and the inaugural Associate Vice President for Institutional Development at Chinese University of Hong Kong, Shenzhen in China.

=== BRAC University ===
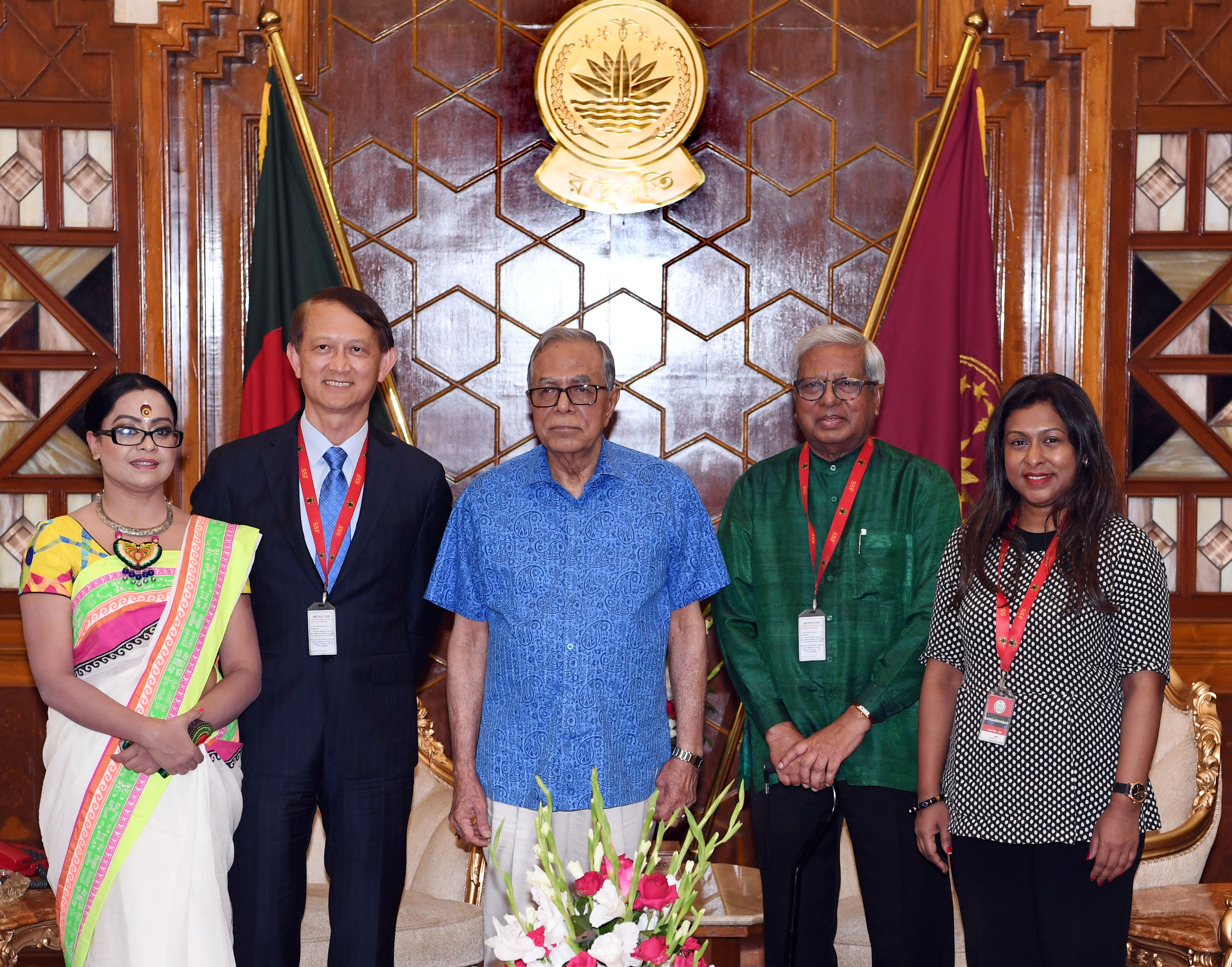
Chang and Abed with President Mohammad Abdul Hamid, 2018

Shortly after joining BRAC University in February 2019, Chang introduced BRAC University 2.0 as Bangladesh's international university and a research institution. He has three objectives for the university: internationalization, student life, and research with impact. During his first year in office, he created the Graduate School of Management, School of Data and Sciences, School of Life Sciences, School of Humanities and Social Sciences, School of Architecture and Design, and School of General Education, in addition to the School of Engineering, School of Law, and School of Business. The School of Medicine is under planning.

In March 2019, Chang visited the Rohingya refugee camps, which are located in the vicinity of Cox's Bazar, near Myanmar. Over one million Rohingyas have taken refuge in the camps following a Myanmar military crackdown in Rakhine State in August 2017. He has since committed BRAC University to humanitarian research about the Rohingyas.

Following the visit, Chang supported the partnership between BRAC University's Centre for Peace and Justice and the International Institute of Social Studies (ISS). An International Conclave on Justice and Accountability for the Rohingyas was held in The Hague, Netherlands, on October 18, 2019. The Conclave opened up constructive debates around the Rohingya crisis.

Chang officially introduced BRAC University 2.0 on October 26, 2019 in the Foundation Stone Laying Ceremony for BRAC University's new campus. The founder of BRAC University, Sir Fazle Hasan Abed, KCMG laid the foundation stone. In December 2019, Chang received the Bangladesh's national flag that was taken into space by Bangladesh's first Nano-Satellite BRAC Onnesha. The flag was delivered by the Japan Aerospace Exploration Agency. The satellite was developed by BRAC University School of Engineering's faculty and students. In January 2020, he mandated the Duke of Edinburgh Award Programme into BRAC University's student life curriculum. It is the first University in Bangladesh to make it an essential student experience.

Chang was instrumental in BRAC University's inaugural membership of the Open Society University Network. George Soros announced the University's involvement at the World Economic Forum in Davos, Switzerland, on 24 January 2020.

Under Chang's leadership, BRAC University ranked GLOBAL TOP 50 for 'Sustainable Development Goals (SDG 1): No poverty' in the Times Higher Education (THE) Impact Rankings 2020. BRAC University's performance has been found to be particularly encouraging in delivering the goals in the university's research on poverty and their support for poor students and citizens in the local community.

In response to the COVID-19 pandemic, Chang launched the Student Assistance Fund in May 2020. In June 2020, he launched BRAC University's online learning platform buX. Chang was elected as a steering committee member of the Talloires Network of Engaged Universities in February 2021. The advisory body provides guidance for the network. The Talloires Network of Engaged Universities is a growing global coalition of presidents, vice-chancellors and rectors from 410 universities in 79 countries. The steering committee consists of 13 international members.

In a meeting with the President of Nepal, Bidya Devi Bhandari and the Prime Minister of Bhutan, Lotay Tshering in Dhaka in March 2021, Chang explained his vision on becoming an international institution. The British High Commissioner to Bangladesh, Mr. Robert Chatterton Dickson joined Chang in the Orientation for Fall 2021 of BRAC University where the High Commissioner presented certificates of appreciation to recipients of 2021 Diana Award.

On May 10, 2022, Chang met with President Md. Abdul Hamid of Bangladesh at the President’s Office. During the meeting, Chang highlighted the importance of developing local human resources and how that can move Bangladesh’s economy to the next level.

Chang briefed President Hamid on BRAC University’s drive for research, international collaborations and student centric initiatives and updated on the University’s resilient response to Covid-19 and its growth even in this challenging time. President Hamid expressed his expectation to see BRAC University to lead by example in the higher education sector of Bangladesh. He briefed President Hamid on BRAC University’s drive for research, international collaborations and student centric initiatives and updated on the University’s resilient response to Covid-19 and its growth even in this challenging time.

President Hamid expressed his expectation to see BRAC University to lead by example in the higher education sector of Bangladesh.

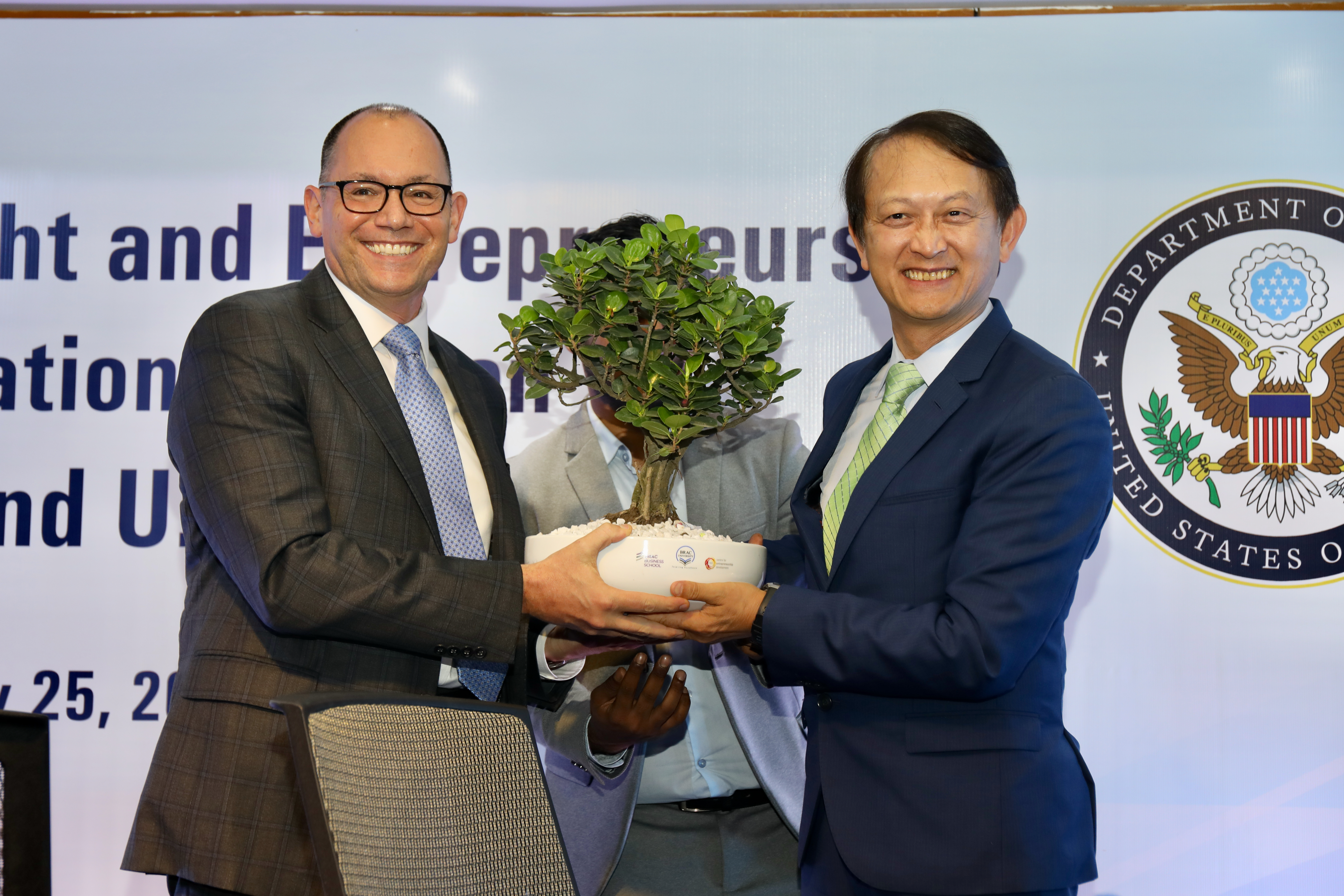
Chang with the US Ambassador to Bangladesh Peter D. Haas

On May 25, 2022, Chang and U.S. Ambassador to Bangladesh Peter Haas announced the partnership between U.S. Embassy and BRAC University on the resumption of the U.S. Fulbright Program in Bangladesh after six years of suspension. Chang said this is aligned with the three key development areas for the university, namely internationalization, research with impact, and student centricity.

== Books ==
=== Vincent of Bangladesh ===
In May 2024, Prothoma Prokashon, one of the publishers in Bangladesh and the publishing arm of Prothom Alo, the country's best-selling national daily, published a book about Professor Vincent Chang titled Vincent of Bangladesh.
