= Syed Saad Andaleeb =

Bangladeshi-American academic

Syed Saad

Vice-Chancellor of BRAC University
- In office 21 July 2014 – 2018
- Chancellor: Mohammad Abdul Hamid
- Preceded by: Ainun Nishat
- Succeeded by: Vincent Chang

Personal details
- Education: Ph.D. (Business Administration)
- Alma mater: University of New Hampshire; University of Illinois at Urbana-Champaign
- Occupation: Academic, administrator

Syed Saad Andaleeb is a Bangladeshi-American academic who served as the 3rd Vice-chancellor of BRAC University.

== Education and career ==
Andaleeb obtained his bachelor's in chemical engineering in 1976 and master's in business administration in 1977 from University of New Hampshire. He then earned his Ph.D. in business administration from the University of Illinois at Urbana-Champaign in 1989.

Andaleeb was a distinguished professor of marketing at the Sam and Irene Black School of Business, Pennsylvania State University – Erie, The Behrend College in the United States.

== Activities ==
At the invitation of Philip Kotler, Andaleeb moderated a panel on "Moving to Corporate Social Responsibility as the Next Stage for Company Success" at the World Marketing Summit, which was held in Tokyo from October 13–14, 2015.
