= Abdur Rahman Chowdhury (justice) =

Bangladeshi judge (1926–1994)

- আবদুর রহমান চৌধুরী

President of Bangla Academy
- In office 14 May 1993 – 11 January 1994
- Preceded by: Gazi Shamsur Rahman
- Succeeded by: Gazi Shamsur Rahman

Personal details
- Born: A.F.M. Abdur Rahman Chowdhury; 1926
- Died: 11 January 1994 (aged 67–68)
- Spouse: Begum Sitara Chowdhury
- Children: Zubayer Rahman Chowdhury, Dr. Riazur Rahman Chowdhury
- Parent: Abdul Latif Chowdhury (father)
- Education: University of Dhaka

A.F.M. Abdur Rahman Chowdhury (1926 – 11 January 1994) was a Bangladeshi judge. He served as a justice of Supreme Court of Bangladesh and the president of Bangla Academy from 1993 until his death in office.

== Background and career ==
Abdur Rahman Chowdhury was born in 1926 to Khan Bahadur Abdul Latif Chowdhury in a Zamindar family of Bengal Presidency.

Chowdhury was the vice president of Salimullah Muslim Hall at the University of Dhaka in 1948. He was elected Secretary General of the then East Pakistan Bar Association in 1967 and 1968. He was elevated as a Judge of the Supreme Court of Bangladesh in 1973 and served the office until 1983.

Chowdhury represented Bangladesh in the United Nations General Assembly in 1977. He was appointed an arbitrator in the International Court of Arbitration in Paris in 1993.

== Personal life ==
Abdur Rahman Chowdhury was married to Begum Sitara Chowdhury. Together they had a son, Zubayer Rahman Chowdhury, 26th chief justice of Bangladesh.
