= BRAC University =

Private university in Dhaka, Bangladesh

- ব্র্যাক ইউনিভার্সিটি
- Logo of Brac University
- Other name: BRACU
- Motto: Inspiring Excellence
- Type: Private research university
- Established: 2001; 25 years ago
- Founder: Fazle Hasan Abed
- Accreditation: Bar Council; IAB; PCB; IEB; ACU; Association to Advance Collegiate Schools of Business; Association of Private Universities of Bangladesh (APUB)
- Affiliations: University Grants Commission (UGC)
- Chancellor: President Mirza Fakhrul Islam Alamgir
- Vice-Chancellor: Syed Ferhat Anwar
- Faculty: 649
- Students: 20000+ (2025)
- Undergraduates: 17000+
- Postgraduates: 3000+
- Location: Kha 224 Pragati Sarani, Merul Badda, Dhaka, 1212, Bangladesh; 23.7725°N 90.4254°E
- Campus: Urban, 5 acres (2.0 ha) (city campus)
- Language: English
- Colours: Blue, Black, Gray
- Website: www.bracu.ac.bd

University rankings

Global – Overall
- QS World: 1001-1200 (2027)
- THE World: 1001-1200 (2026)

Global – Business and economics
- THE Business and Economics: 601-800 (2026)

Global – Liberal arts
- THE Social Sciences: 601-800 (2026)

Global – Life sciences and medicine
- THE Clinical and Health: 401-500 (2026)

Global – Science and engineering
- THE Computer Science: 801-1000 (2026)
- THE Engineering: 801-1000 (2026)
- THE Physical Sciences: 801-1000 (2026)

Regional – Overall
- QS Asia: 260 (2026)
- THE Asia: 501-600 (2025)

BRAC University (Bengali: ব্র্যাক ইউনিভার্সিটি, also known as BRACU) is a private research university located in Merul Badda, Dhaka, Bangladesh. It was established in 2001 as a branch of Sir Fazle Hasan Abed's BRAC under the Private University Act 1992.

== History ==
Sir Fazle Hasan Abed founded BRAC University in 2001, under the Private University Act. The university was formally inaugurated by the President of Bangladesh and the Chancellor of BRAC University, Shahabuddin Ahmed, at Osmani Memorial Hall, Dhaka, on 16 June 2001. Based on the American liberal arts college model, the university began with just three departments and around 80 students in 2001 at Mohakhali, Dhaka. It held its first convocation in January 2006. As the university grew, it increased the number of programs and introduced master's degrees. The development of a library with high academic standards was important to Sir Abed. The Ayesha Abed Library was digitized shortly after its inception. The university had 11,200 students in 20 schools, departments, and institutes in 2020. In 2023, Brac University authorities proposed to change its name to "Sir Fazle Hasan Abed University". But the University Grants Commission declined it. Now, BRAC University has a permanent city campus in Merul Badda, Dhaka.

== Campus ==
=== Permanent ===
BRAC University has a permanent city campus in Merul Badda, Dhaka, a campus designed by WOHA Designs Pte Ltd., an architectural firm based in Singapore. Construction of this facility began in 2017. The university building has 14 floors and a total area of 157,935 sq. meters. The facilities include an auditorium with 700 seats, a multipurpose hall used for large gatherings and indoor sports, classrooms, labs, design studios, lecture theaters, an IT data center, UPS, CCTVs, a cafeteria, an e-library, a parking lot, recreation facilities, and a rooftop playground. The new campus is 2017 LafargeHolcim Asia Pacific- Bronze Winner awarded by LafargeHolcim Foundation for Sustainable Construction. Until November 2023, the educational programs were conducted at the temporary campus of Mohakhali, but from then on, all the activities were to be conducted at the permanent campus of Merul Badda.

=== Residential ===
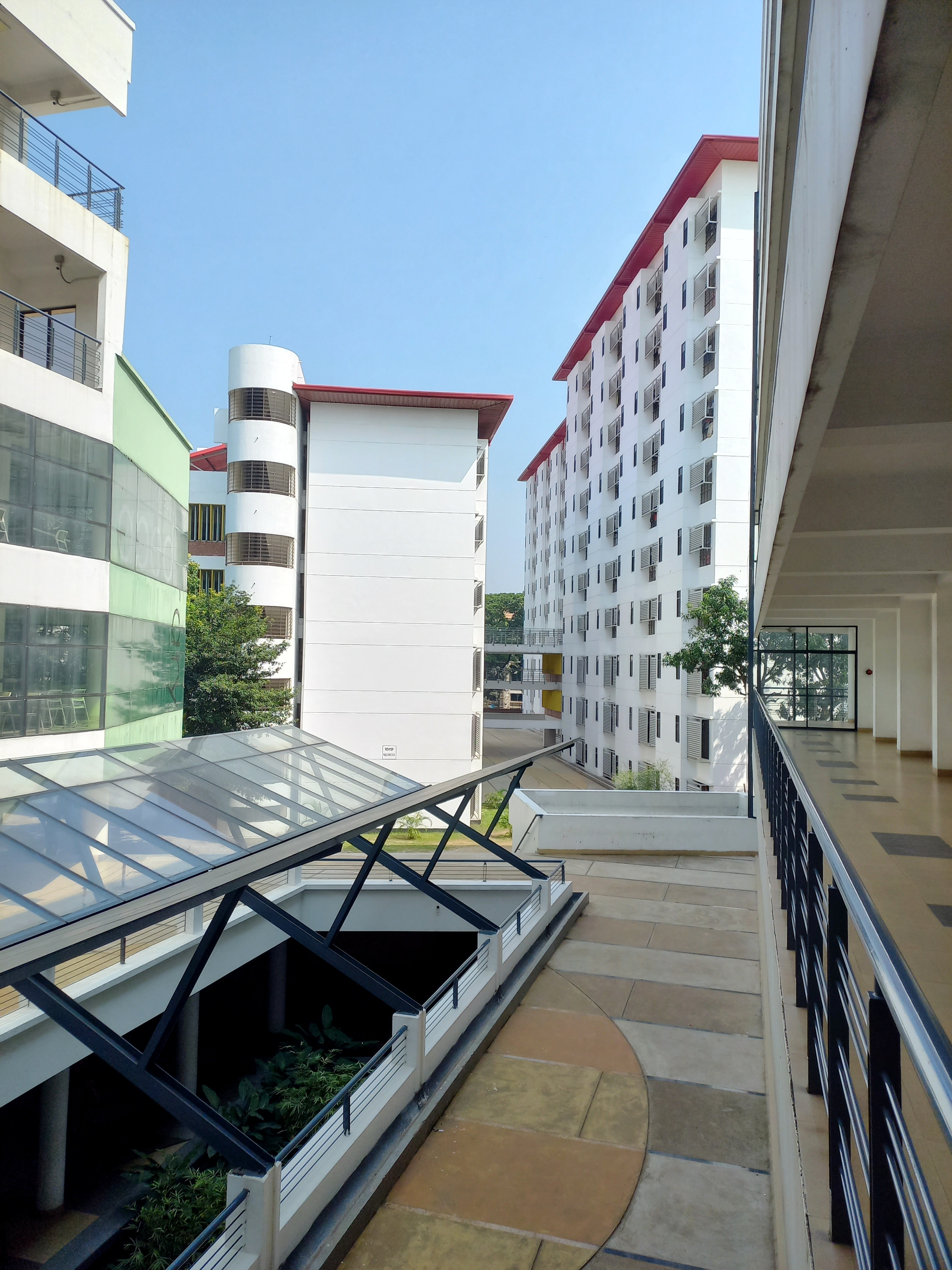
Inside the BRAC University residential campus (Tarc)

The Residential Campus at Savar was founded in 2003 and substantially expanded in 2012. Students spend a semester on the Residential Campus, where they take courses on the Bengali language, Bangladesh history, English language, and ethics. All students are assigned to partake in community service activities, and are incentivised to sign up for further community-driven opportunities. Residential Semester is mandatory for every undergraduate student, and is a requirement for graduation.

=== Resources and facilities ===
- Ayesha Abed Library
- Counseling Unit at RS
- Courseware Moodle
- Fabrication Lab
- MSDN Academic Alliance

== Organization and administration ==
=== Leadership and management ===
The current structure was established in 2011. The President of Bangladesh is BRAC University's Chancellor. The board of trustees is the highest policy-making body of BRAC University. It has 12 members, one of them being the Vice-Chancellor. Chaired by the Vice-Chancellor, the Syndicate supervises the academic and administrative functions of the university. The Academic Council, also chaired by the Vice-Chancellor, makes education policy recommendations and reviews curricula and academic progress.

=== Administration ===
The university administration is led by the Vice-Chancellor, the Registrar, and the Heads of academic units.

=== Vice chancellors ===
Year of Joining	Expiration of Tenure of Office	Name
2001	2010	Jamilur Reza Choudhury
2010	2014	Ainun Nishat
2014	2018	Syed Saad Andaleeb
2019	2023	Vincent Chang
2023	2024	Syed Mahfuzul Aziz (Acting)
2024	present	Syed Ferhat Anwar

== Academics ==
Diverse academic units serve the mission of BRAC University. Departments have degree-granting programs, schools support strategic initiatives, institutes are autonomous research entities, and centers are project-based entities.

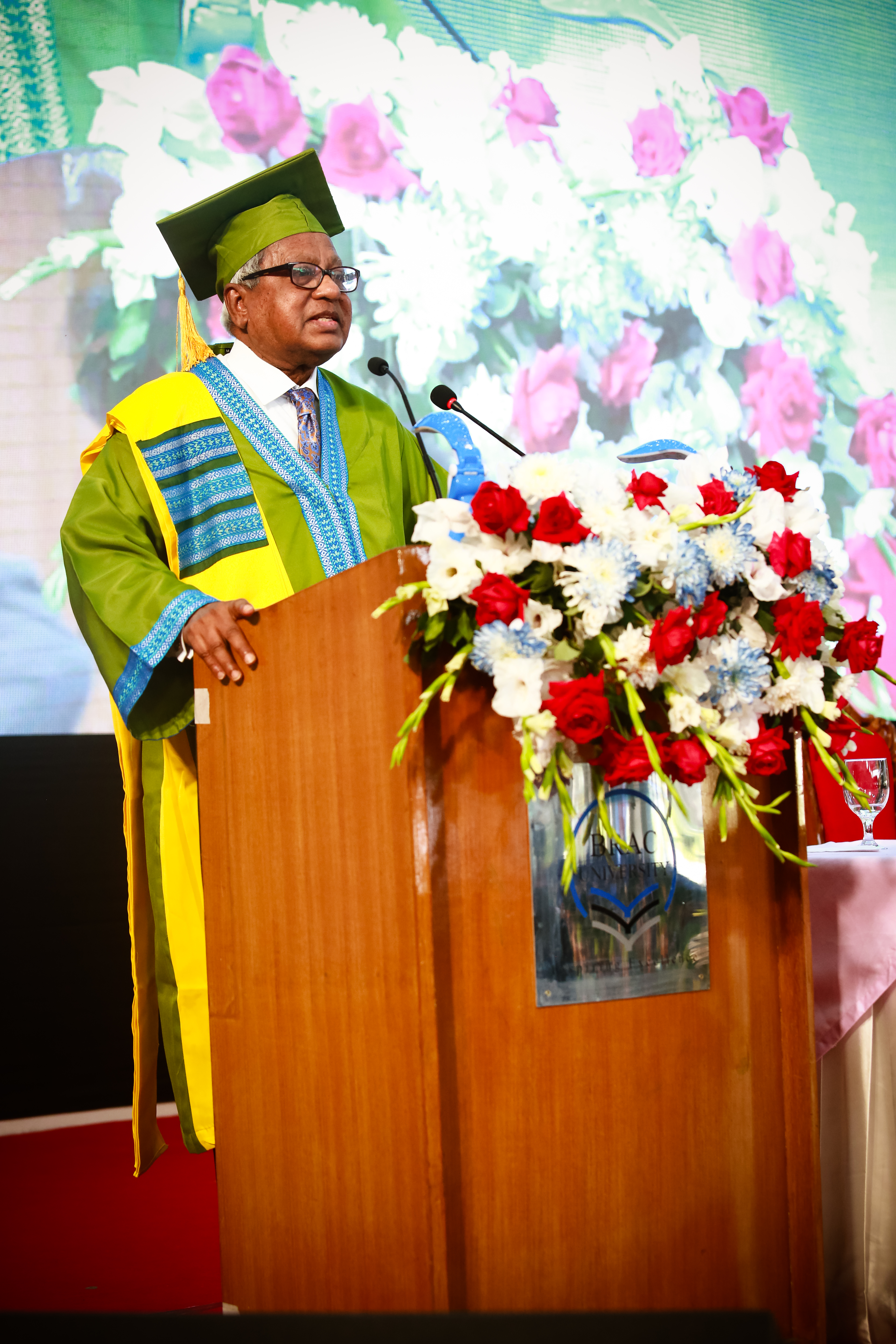
University founder Sir Fazle Hasan Abed delivering speech at the 11th Convocation

=== Schools ===
- BRAC Business School
- BSRM School of Engineering
- James P Grant School of Public Health
- School of Architecture and Design
- School of Data and Sciences
- School of General Education
- School of Humanities and Social Sciences
- School of Law
- School of Life Sciences
- School of Pharmacy

=== Institutes ===
- BRAC Institute of Educational Development
- BRAC Institute of Governance and Development
- BRAC Institute of Languages

=== Departments ===
- Department of Architecture
- Department of Biotechnology
- Department of Computer Science and Engineering
- Department of Economics and Social Sciences
- Department of Electrical and Electronic Engineering
- Department of English and Humanities
- Department of Mathematics and Natural Sciences
- Department of Microbiology

=== Centres ===
- Centre for Climate Change and Environmental Research (C3ER)
- Centre for Entrepreneurship Development (CED)
- Centre for Peace and Justice (CPJ)
- Learning and Teaching Innovation Centre (LTIC)

=== Programs Offered ===
==== Undergraduate ====
- Bachelor of Architecture
- Bachelor of Arts in Applied English Language Studies
- Bachelor of Arts in English
- Bachelor of Business Administration
- Bachelor of Laws (Honours)
- Bachelor of Pharmacy (Honours)
- Bachelor of Science in Applied Physics and Electronics
- Bachelor of Science in Biotechnology
- Bachelor of Science in Computer Science
- Bachelor of Science in Computer Science and Engineering
- Bachelor of Science in Electronic and Communication Engineering
- Bachelor of Science in Electrical and Electronic Engineering
- Bachelor of Science in Mathematics
- Bachelor of Science in Microbiology
- Bachelor of Science in Physics
- Bachelor of Social Sciences in Anthropology
- Bachelor of Social Science in Economics

==== Postgraduate ====
===== Certificate and Postgraduate Diploma =====
- Certificate in Analog VLSI Circuit and Layout Design
- Certificate in Data Science
- Certificate in Digital VLSI Physical Design
- Certificate in E-Commerce and Fintech Development
- Certificate in Financial Crime and Compliance
- Certificate in Internet of Things (IoT) for Production and Manufacturing
- Certificate in Machine Learning and Deep Learning
- Certificate in TESOL for Sustainable Development and Social Equity
- Professional Certificate Course on Environmental, Social and Governance
- Postgraduate Diploma in Disaster Management
- Postgraduate Diploma in Educational Leadership and School Improvement
- Postgraduate Diploma in Knitwear Industry Management

===== Masters =====
- Executive Master of Business Administration
- Masters in Procurement and Supply Management
- Master of Arts in English
- Master of Arts in Governance and Development
- Master of Arts in Teaching English to Speakers of Other Languages
- Master of Business Administration
- Master of Development Studies
- Master of Disaster Management
- Master of Education in Educational Leadership and School Improvement
- Master of Engineering in Computer Science and Engineering
- Master of Engineering in Electrical and Electronic Engineering
- Master of Laws
- Master of Public Health
- Master of Science in Applied Economics
- Master of Science in Biotechnology
- Master of Science in Computer Science and Engineering
- Master of Science in Early Childhood Development
- Master of Science in Electrical and Electronic Engineering
- Master of Science in Mental Health and Psychosocial Support

===== Doctorate =====
- Doctor of Philosophy in Political Economy of Development (BRAC University-SOAS University of London Joint PhD Program)

=== Financial aid ===
BRAC University was founded to support financially disadvantaged students. One of the early donors was the BRAC Ford scholarship program. The university has developed several scholarship programs for national and international students. The Open Society Foundation and the Open Society University Network have supported student activities and education.

== Student life ==
The Office of Student Life (OSL) was created in 2019. OSL supervises the Department of Career Services, Alumni Affairs, and Clubs & Societies.

Many of the private university students of Bangladesh live with their parents during their university life. However, BRAC University has a mandatory residential semester at their Savar residential campus.

=== Student achievements ===
On 14 November 2021, Brac University team became the first Bangladeshi team to become champion at Cambridge Intervarsity debate tournament.

== Notable people ==
=== Faculty ===
- Ainun Nishat
- Jamilur Reza Choudhury
- Salehuddin Ahmed
- Syed Saad Andaleeb
- Vincent Chang
- A F M Yusuf Haider
- Syed Ferhat Anwar
- Mahbubul Alam Majumdar

=== Student ===
- Hochemin Islam
- Rafiath Rashid Mithila
- Yash Rohan
- Nuhash Humayun

== Controversies ==
Asif Mahtab, a part-time teacher of BRAC University held a teacher's conference in January 2024 following the continuation of the textbook controversy in Bangladesh, demonstrated anti-transgenderism by tearing the pages of the seventh grade textbook. In response to this protest, BRAC University authorities fired Asif Mahtab. When the incident went viral on social media, many criticized BRAC and called for a boycott of all BRAC-related products and services.

A group of people and some students of BRAC University staged a protest in response to the dismissal of teacher Asif Mahtab and calling for clarification of BRAC University's position on transitioning. In the protest rally, they announced a boycott of all BRAC-related products, services and university classes. In addition, the Islami Andolan Bangladesh called for a boycott of Aarong and BRAC university as part of the anti-transition protest.
