= Ainun Nishat =

Bangladeshi academic

- আইনুন নিশাত
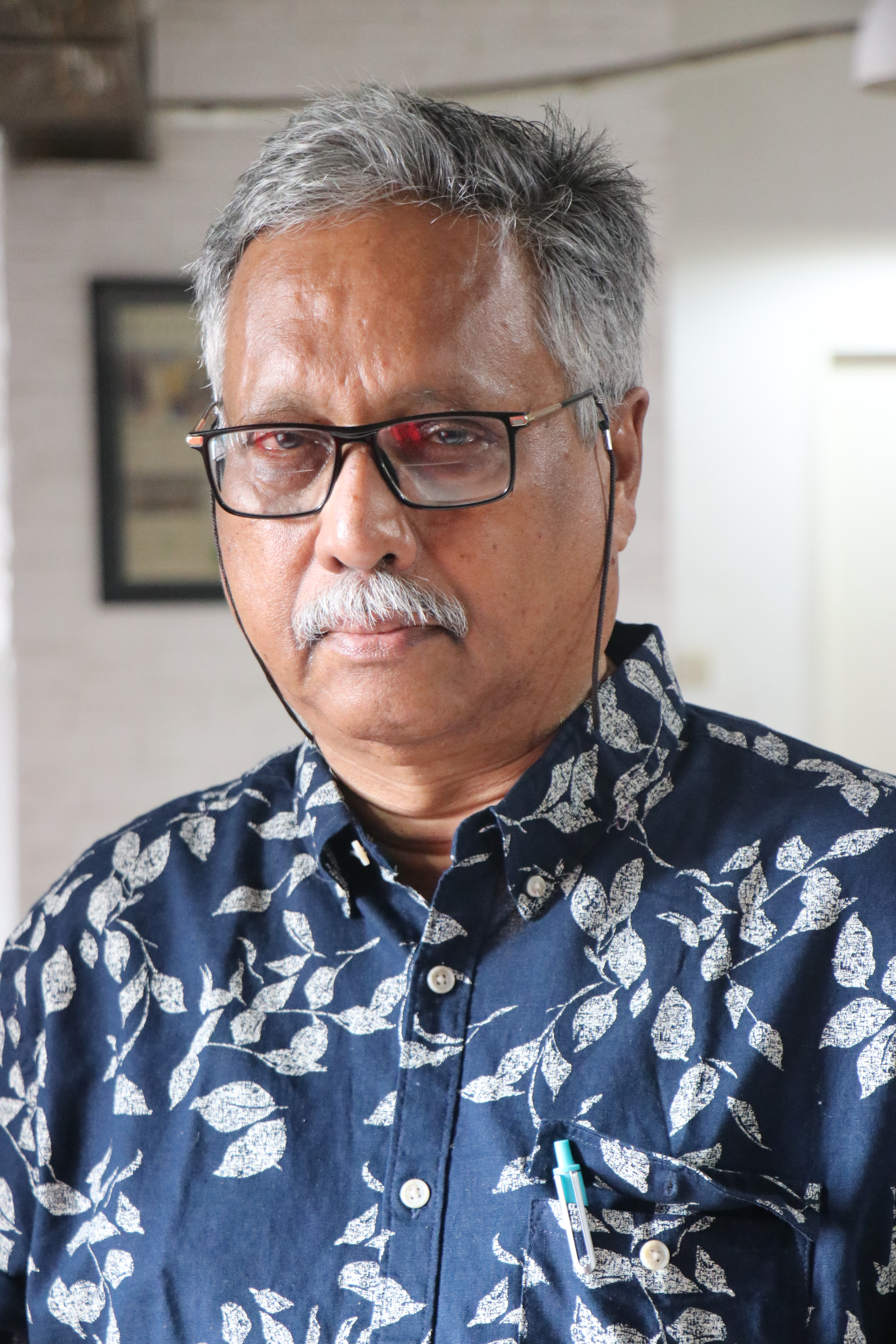
- Nishat in 2019

Vice-Chancellor of BRAC University
- In office 2010–2014
- Chancellor: Zillur Rahman; Mohammad Abdul Hamid
- Preceded by: Jamilur Reza Choudhury
- Succeeded by: Syed Saad Andaleeb

Personal details
- Born: 29 April 1948 (age 78)
- Parent: Gazi Shamsur Rahman (father)
- Education: PhD (civil engineering)
- Alma mater: Mirzapur Cadet College Bangladesh University of Engineering and Technology; University of Strathclyde
- Known for: Water resource specialist

Ainun Nishat (born 29 April 1948) is a water resource and climate change specialist from Bangladesh. As of 2017, he is serving as a professor emeritus of BRAC University. He represented Bangladesh at the 2009 United Nations Climate Change Conference in 2009, among other international climate-related conferences.

== Background and education ==
Nishat was born to Gazi Shamsur Rahman, lawyer and writer, and Zamal Ara Rahman, a graduate from Lady Brabourne College in Kolkata. Prof. Nishat attended many schools in different places such as Panchagarh, Bogura, Noakhali, Sylhet, Dinajpur before matriculating (SSC) form Dhaka Collegiate School in 1963. Nishat completed his BSc in Civil Engineering and MSc in Water Resources Engineering from Bangladesh University of Engineering and Technology (BUET) in 1975. He obtained his PhD degree in Civil Engineering from the University of Strathclyde, Glasgow, Scotland in 1981.

== Career ==
Nishat started his career as an assistant engineer at the Bangladesh Water Development Board. He then joined his alma mater BUET as a lecturer in 1972 in Department of Civil Engineering. He became an assistant professor at Department of Water Resources Engineering in 1975 and he became a professor in 1985.

Nishat retired from BUET in 1998 to join IUCN. He also worked as a professor at North South University. He served as the Vice-Chancellor of BRAC University during 2010–2014.

Nishat is credited as a pioneer of water resource management in Bangladesh, and has traveled around the world presenting papers, talks and consultancies related to his subject.

=== Non-academic work ===
Besides working on various projects of the World Bank and the Asian Development Bank in Bangladesh, Malaysia and Philippines, he was a member of the panel of experts who consulted the construction of the Jamuna Bridge, the longest bridge in Bangladesh.

He is a member of the Bangladesh National Water Council, Indo-Bangladesh Joint River Commission and Bangladesh National Agricultural Commission and the National Council on Science and Technology, and is said to have played a pivotal role in the Ganges Water Treaty Negotiations that were completed in 1996. He had been closely involved in the preparation of the Bangladesh National Conservation Strategy and National Environment Management Action Plan.

Nishat has been member of the Bangladesh delegation at a number of international water resource-related conferences, including the COP 15. And Center for Sustainable Development - (CFSD) with Mahfuz Ullah. Nishat also represented Bangladesh at the United Nations Economic and Social Council in the Committee for Energy and National Resources Development, and features at the United Nations Framework Convention on Climate Change.
