= Zubayer Rahman Chowdhury =

26th Chief Justice of Bangladesh

- জুবায়ের রহমান চৌধুরী
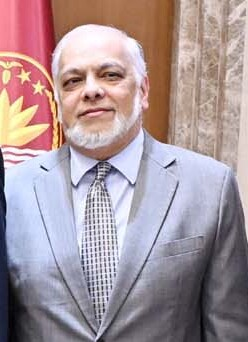
- Chowdhury in 2024

26th Chief Justice of Bangladesh
- Incumbent
- Assumed office 28 December 2025
- Appointed by: Mohammed Shahabuddin (President of Bangladesh)
- Preceded by: Syed Refaat Ahmed

Personal details
- Born: 18 May 1961 (age 65) Mehendiganj, Barisal, East Pakistan (now Bangladesh)
- Citizenship: Bangladesh
- Parent(s): A.F.M. Abdur Rahman Chowdhury (father); Begum Sitara Chowdhury (mother)
- Education: University of Dhaka (LLB, LLM)
- Profession: Judge

Zubayer Rahman Chowdhury (born 18 May 1961) is a Bangladeshi jurist who is the current and 26th Chief Justice of Bangladesh. Previously, he was a judge of the Appellate Division of the Supreme Court of Bangladesh.

== Early life ==
Chowdhury was born on 18 May 1961. His father was Justice A. F. M. Abdur Rahman Chowdhury. He completed his bachelor's and master's in law from the University of Dhaka.

== Career ==
Chowdhury started working as a lawyer on 3 March 1985. He was elevated to a lawyer of the High Court Division on 17 May 1987.

On 27 August 2003, Chowdhury was appointed an additional judge of the High Court Division. His appointment to the High Court Division became permanent on 27 August 2005.

On 28 July 2008, Chowdhury and 18 other judges opposed a High Court Division verdict that called for judges whose appointment was not confirmed by the Bangladesh Nationalist Party to be confirmed.

On 7 January 2010, Chowdhury and Sashanka Shekhar Sarkar issued an order stating it was illegal for the government to make a civil servant an officer on special duty for more than 150 days.

On 27 August 2024, Chowdhury was appointed Bangladesh Judicial Service Commission (BJSC) Chairman. On 29 October, he was nominated as head of EC search committee.

On 24 December 2025, Chowdhury was appointed as the 26th Chief Justice of Bangladesh.

Order of precedence
Preceded by Hafiz Uddin Ahmad as Speaker of the Parliament	Order of precedence of Bangladesh as Chief Justice	Followed by Mohammad Abdul Hamid as former President
