= Begum Para, Toronto =

2020 Money laundering scandal in Bangladesh

A Prothom Alo article about 'Begum Para' on 22 November 2020

Begum Para (Bengali: বেগম পাড়া) is the colloquial name of a neighborhood in Toronto, Canada primarily populated by upper-class Bangladeshis. The area is connected to several money laundering scandals in Bangladesh. These scandals arose in 2019–2020, when it started coming to light in various newspapers and the foreign ministry of Bangladesh found the connection of money launderers to the Begum Para where various real estate assets were purchased in Canada with dollars looted out of Bangladesh.

Most of the launderers are Bangladeshi government officials, followed by politicians and businessmen. In Begum Para, wives and children of the Bangladeshi elite live a luxurious life with the illegal money sent by their husbands. Retiring from their job, the guys go to their Begums (wives) in Canada. For this reason, these places have been named Begum Para.

== Etymology ==
Begum Para is a Bangla term, which is basically a big money laundering scandal in Bangladesh. However the term literally indicates a symbolic area located somewhere in Canada. It is not a formally or historically created area. Basically, this Bangla term is used by Bangladeshi people to convey a special meaning. To the Bangladeshi people, media and legislative bodies, the term Begum Para refers to houses or places of residence purchased in Canada with smuggled dollars by money launderers.

Although Begum Para is a derived form of a Hindustani word, it has a completely different meaning. The Bengali term Begum Para was originally derived from Begumpura. It means a colony of wives in the Greater Toronto Area whose husbands used to leave their wives in the area and go elsewhere in search of work.

== Possible location ==
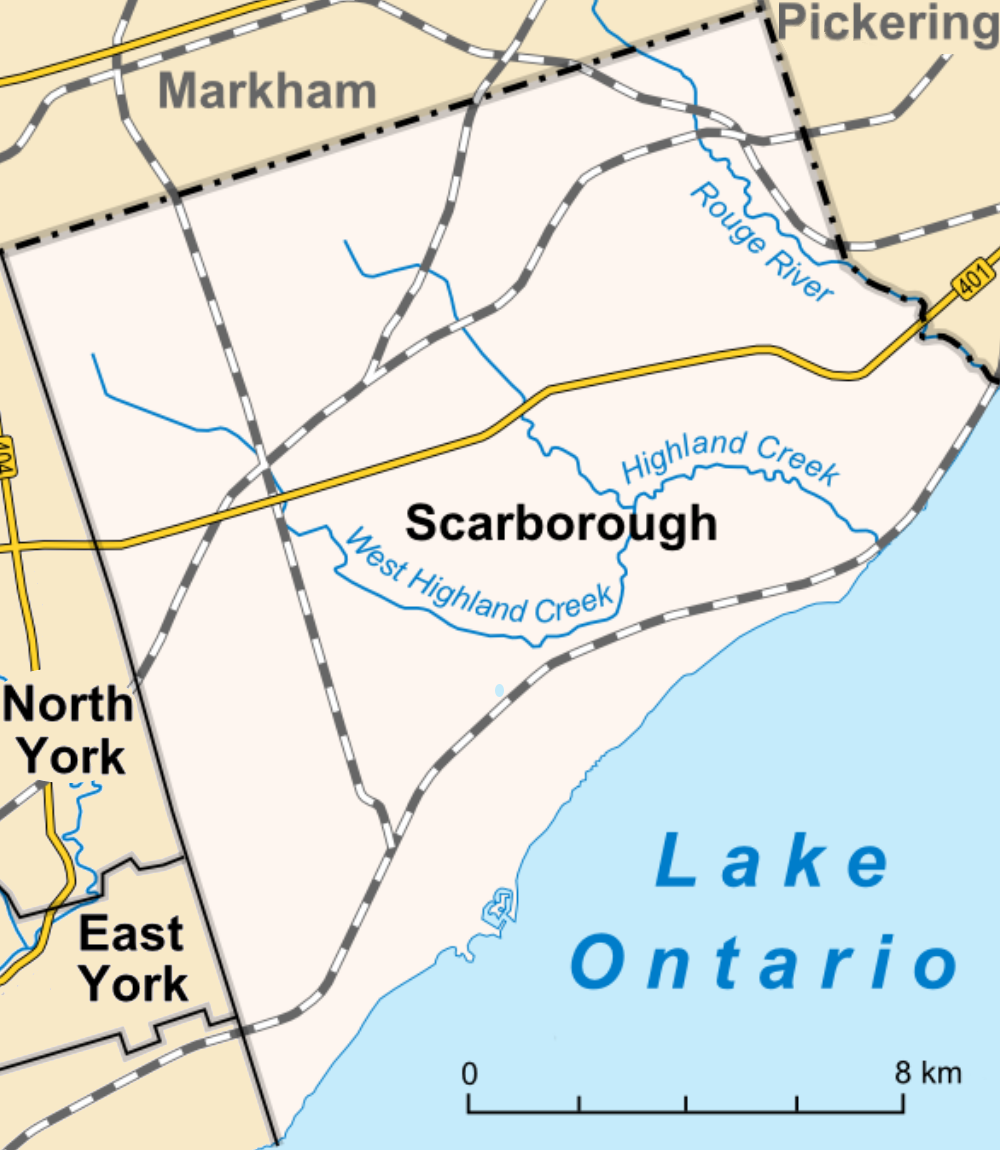
Map of Scarborough, Canada

Even though Begum Para is a Bangladeshi scandal, but it originated somewhere in Canada. Former Bangladeshi Ambassador M Sirajul Islam told a story in Britain's Independent newspaper that an area of Toronto, Canada is called as 'Begum Para' by the Bangladeshis. Since this is a symbolic area, no area officially renamed in Canada by this name. This Bangla term also includes properties purchased with laundered money in other Canadian cities outside of Toronto. However, based on information obtained by journalists, one area of Canada that can be specifically identified as Begum Para is Scarborough, because most Bangladeshi looters have purchased properties in this area.

The Canadian government has so far tracked down 200 Bangladeshi looters but does not disclose information. As expatriates, the number is more than a thousand. They also purchased assets in luxury high-rise condominiums in the Bellevue Square Park, the heart of Toronto in the vicinity of the CN Tower, the upscale homes of Richmond Hill, and elite areas of Mississauga and Markham adjacent to Toronto. Not only these, there are many other areas, which names have not yet been come to light.

== Controversy ==
Begum Para of Toronto in Canada is an open secret and has become a hot cake of political discussions as many Bangladeshis have bought luxurious residences in Begum Para and spent millions laundered from Bangladesh. The Anti-Corruption Commission asked the government to provide a list of its officials who bought homes in Begum Para. The Bangladesh Financial Intelligence Unit informed to the court that they had requested the financial intelligence unit of Canada to provide the information of all Bangladeshi persons who might have laundered money from Bangladesh to Canada in the response of Begum Para controversy. In a press briefing, Foreign Minister Abulkalam Abdul Momen said, “Our general idea is that politicians live there. However, it is found that most of them are the government officials. Retired or still employed, they bought a house. Their sons and daughters live in big houses. Some of our businessmen have bought houses there as well.” It is reported that the fugitive Prashanta Kumar Halder has also settled in Begum Para after smuggling ৳3,600 crore.

According to Global Financial Integrity, a Washington-based research firm, around US$6 billion was smuggled out of Bangladesh in 2015 through trade manipulation. Referring to money laundering, bank and stock market looting, former Bangladeshi president Hussain Muhammad Ershad in his 2014 budget speech said, "Money is being smuggled into Malaysia and Canada. Some people are setting their home there. They have built Begum Para in Canada. Where did they get so much money?"

== See also ==
- Bangladeshi Canadians
- Bangladesh-Canada relations
