= Abdul Wahab Joardar =

Bangladeshi soldier

- আব্দুল ওয়াহাব জোয়ার্দার
- Military career
- Allegiance: Pakistan (before 1972); Bangladesh
- Branch: Pakistan Army; Bangladesh Army
- Service years: 1959 - 1984
- Rank: Master warrant officer
- Unit: Regiment of Artillery
- Known for: Assassination of Sheikh Mujibur Rahman

Abdul Wahab Joardar (Bengali: আব্দুল ওয়াহাব জোয়ার্দার) is a Bangladesh Army non-commissioned officer who is known for his role in the assassination of Sheikh Mujibur Rahman, the founding president of Bangladesh.

== Career ==
Joardar was part of the army team that attacked the residence of President Sheikh Mujibur Rahman during the 15 August 1975 Bangladesh coup d'état. He was the subedar of the First Artillery Regiment responsible for guarding the house of President Sheikh Mujibur Rahman. He had disarmed the soldiers before the coup. He was promoted to master warrant officer from subedar after the assassination of Sheikh Mujibur Rahman by Major Syed Faruque Rahman. Joardar was seen by witnesses looting the home of Sheikh Mujibur Rahman.

Joarder was charged with the assassination of former president of Bangladesh Sheikh Mujibur Rahman in 1998 in a case filed by AFM Muhitul Islam. On 5 January 1998, Joarder was presented before the Dhaka District and Sessions, presided by Judge Kazi Golam Rasul, along with A.K.M. Mohiuddin Ahmed, Sultan Shahriar Rashid Khan, Syed Faruque Rahman, and Taheruddin Thakur. He was represented by advocate Abdur Razzaq Khan. He, along with three other accused, former minister Taheruddin Thakur, Dafadar Marfat Ali Shah, and Dafadar Abul Hashem Mridha, was acquitted.
