= Shahjahan Bhuiyan =

Bangladeshi Executioner

- শাহজাহান ভূঁইয়া
- Born: 26 March 1950; Isakhali, East Bengal, Dominion of Pakistan
- Died: 24 June 2024 (aged 74); Dhaka, Bangladesh
- Resting place: Isakhali, Palash Upazila, Narsingdi District
- Other name: Jollad Shahjahan (Executioner Shahjahan)
- Education: Narsingdi Government College
- Occupations: Soldier, executioner, tea seller
- Known for: Longest-serving prisoner in Bangladesh and deadliest executioner
- Political party: Communist Party of Bangladesh (from 1976)
- Other political affiliations: Proletarian Party of East Bengal
- Criminal charge(s): Robbery, murder, and Arms Act violations
- Criminal penalty: 42 years imprisonment (commuted from 184 years)
- Spouse: Sathi Akhter (m. 2023; div. 2024)

Shahjahan Bhuiyan (Bengali: শাহজাহান ভূঁইয়া; 26 March 1950 – 24 June 2024) was a Bangladeshi communist revolutionary, prisoner, and executioner. He was sentenced to a cumulative total of 184 years in prison for various crimes; he later served over 31 years of jail time due to sentence appeals, good behavior and performing executions. During his imprisonment, he served as an executioner, carrying out the death sentences of six assassins of Sheikh Mujibur Rahman, convicted war criminals of the Bangladesh genocide, and several other notable murder convicts. He was the longest-serving inmate in Bangladesh's history and the executioner who performed the highest number of hangings in the country.

Throughout his time as an executioner, he personally carried out or assisted in at least 26 executions, including those of Munir Hussain, Ershad Sikder, the Yasmin murder case convicts, Siddique ul-Islam, Ataur Rahman Sunny, Bazlul Huda, Mohiuddin Ahmed, Syed Farooq-ur-Rahman, Sultan Shahriar Rashid Khan, AKM Mohiuddin Ahmed, Abdul Quader Molla, Ali Ahsan Mohammad Mojaheed, Salahuddin Quader Chowdhury, and Mir Quasem Ali.

== Early life ==
Shahjahan Bhuiyan was born on 26 March 1950 in Isakhali, East Bengal, Dominion of Pakistan (situated in present-day Gazaria Union, Palash Upazila, Narsingdi District, Bangladesh). He was the son of Hasan Ali Bhuiyan and Meher, and grew up alongside four siblings: three sisters and one brother.

Bhuiyan received his primary education at Khas Hawla Government Primary School and later attended Parulia High School, where he completed his Secondary School Certificate (SSC). He then enrolled at Narsingdi Government College and completed his Higher Secondary Certificate (HSC) in 1974.

== Military service ==
After completing his higher secondary education, Bhuiyan joined the Bangladesh Army as a sepoy. He served in the military for approximately three years. However, Bhuiyan struggled to adapt to military discipline and left his barracks without authorization to return to his village. After remaining absent from his post for 11 months, he was court-martialed for breaching military regulations. In 1981, he was formally dismissed from the army and sentenced to one year of imprisonment. He was subsequently transferred to Old Dhaka Central Jail to serve his sentence.

== Political career and criminal activities ==
During the early 1970s, Bhuiyan operated as a far-left insurgent affiliated with the Proletarian Party of East Bengal (PBSP), an outlawed left-wing insurgent group. In 1976, he joined the Communist Party of Bangladesh (CPB) and was appointed as the president of its Narsingdi District branch.

In 1979, Bhuiyan was convicted for his involvement in the death of a truck driver who was killed during an exchange of gunfire with police. In subsequent years, he transitioned into organized crime, joining a criminal gang that executed armed robberies and homicides across multiple districts. Authorities ultimately filed 36 cases against him, comprising 34 murder charges, one robbery charge, and one weapons-related charge.

On 17 December 1991, Bhuiyan was arrested and incarcerated at the Manikganj District Jail. On 8 November 1992, he was convicted of robbery and sentenced to 12 years of imprisonment. On 19 September 1995, he received a 30-year sentence in a separate case involving charges of robbery and murder.

Following his accumulated convictions, Bhuiyan was initially sentenced to a total of 184 years in prison. Through subsequent legal appeals and sentence reductions, his cumulative term was reduced to 42 years of imprisonment, along with a fine totaling 10,000 BDT.

== Executioner career ==
In 1988, seeking to reduce his lengthy prison sentence, Bhuiyan volunteered to serve as an assistant hangman. Under Bangladeshi prison regulations, an executioner earned two months and four days of sentence remission for each hanging carried out. That same year, he participated in his first execution by assisting in the hanging of a convict named Nurul Islam at the Gafargaon facility. In July 1993, he assisted in the execution of Munir Hussain, who was convicted in the high-profile Sharmin murder case.

In 1997, following eight years of service as an assistant, prison authorities transferred Bhuiyan from Manikganj to Dhaka Central Jail and promoted him to chief executioner. During the same year, he conducted his first execution as chief hangman by carrying out the death sentence of a convict named Hasan in the Daisy murder case.

Over the next two decades, Bhuiyan executed several high-profile convicts, political leaders, and militants. On 10 May 2004, he executed the serial killer Ershad Shikder at the Khulna District Jail. On 1 and 29 September 2004, he carried out the executions of police officers and accomplices involved in the Yasmin murder case in Rangpur and Dinajpur. On 29 March 2007, he executed top Islamist militant leaders, including Siddique ul-Islam (widely known as Bangla Bhai) and Ataur Rahman Sunny of the outlawed Jamaatul Mujahideen Bangladesh (JMB), who had orchestrated a 2005 nationwide bombing. On 28 January 2010, he performed the executions of five former military officers Bazlul Huda, Mohiuddin Ahmed, Syed Farooq-ur-Rahman, Sultan Shahriar Rashid Khan, and AKM Mohiuddin Ahmed, who were convicted of the 1975 assassination of Bangladesh's founding president, Sheikh Mujibur Rahman. Bhuiyan later recounted in his memoir that one convict's vocal cords tore during the process, while another, who was paralyzed, had to be executed in a seated position. Between 2013 and 2016, he executed several prominent politicians and ministers of the Bangladesh convicted of war crimes and genocide during the 1971 Bangladesh Liberation War by the International Crimes Tribunal, including Abdul Quader Molla, Ali Ahsan Mohammad Mojaheed, Salahuddin Quader Chowdhury, and Mir Quasem Ali.

A significant discrepancy exists regarding Bhuiyan's total execution count. Official Bangladeshi prison records credited him with 26 executions, as domestic law capped the maximum sentence reduction achievable through execution duties at 10 years. Conversely, in his personal accounts and memoir, Bhuiyan claimed to have pulled the lever for up to 60 executions throughout his career across various regional facilities. Ultimately, his service as an executioner, combined with sentence credits for good conduct and prison labor, earned him a total sentence remission of 10 years, 5 months, and 28 days.

== Release, later life, and memoir ==
On 18 June 2023, Bhuiyan was released from New Dhaka Central Jail after serving over 31 years of his commuted sentence. At the time of his release, prison authorities paid his accumulated legal fines of 10,000 BDT, and his overall sentence had been reduced by over ten years as a reward for his work as an executioner. During the initial months of his release, he resided with a former fellow inmate in Dhaka before eventually renting a single-room residence in the Golambazar area of Keraniganj in Dhaka District. In November 2023, seeking a source of income, he opened a small tea stall in Keraniganj, though he struggled financially and relied partially on loans and assistance from well-wishers.

On 21 December 2023, the 73-year-old Bhuiyan married a 23-year-old woman named Sathi Akhter. In early 2024, the marriage ended after only 53 days, resulting in his wife leaving him and subsequently filing a dowry-related lawsuit against him, which led to further legal complications.

In February 2024, Bhuiyan published his autobiography, titled Kemon Chhilo Jollad Jibon (How was my life as a Hangman), at the Amar Ekushey Book Fair in Dhaka. The memoir garnered significant attention for its descriptions of execution rituals and the final moments of prominent political figures. During interviews at the book fair, Bhuiyan stated that his primary motivation for publishing his life story was to deter young people from resorting to crime.

Before every execution, Bhuiyan maintained a specific personal ritual of performing Islamic ablution and reciting prayers, a practice he adopted on the advice of a paralyzed Islamic scholar he cared for in his prison cell. Bhuiyan maintained that he felt no sympathy or guilt, viewing the hangings strictly as the execution of lawful court orders. However, he later admitted to relying on alcohol and cannabis to cope with the immediate psychological aftermath and induce sleep following executions.

Later in 2024, he joined social media platform TikTok.

== Death ==
On 24 June 2024, during the early hours of Monday morning, he began experiencing breathing difficulties and severe chest pain at his residence. At approximately 3:30 a.m., following the sudden onset of these symptoms, he was urgently transported and admitted to Shaheed Suhrawardy Medical College Hospital in Dhaka.

Later that same morning, at around 5:30 a.m., he passed away while undergoing medical treatment at the facility. His remains were officially released to his surviving sister. Subsequently, his body was transported back to his ancestral village of Isakhali of Narsingdi District for funeral. He was buried in his family graveyard.
