= Munir Hussain =

Munir Hussain may refer to:

- Munir Hussain (commentator) (1929–2013), Pakistani commentator
- Munir Hussain and victims' rights, British businessman and community leader imprisoned for attacking a burglar
- Munir Hussain (singer) (died 1995), Pakistani playback singer
- See Sharmin murder case, about Munir Hussain, Bangladeshi industrialist who killed his wife
- Munir Hossain, Bangladeshi footballer
