= Mahbub Alam Chashi =

Bangladeshi diplomat and academic (1927–1983)

- মাহবুব আলম চাষী
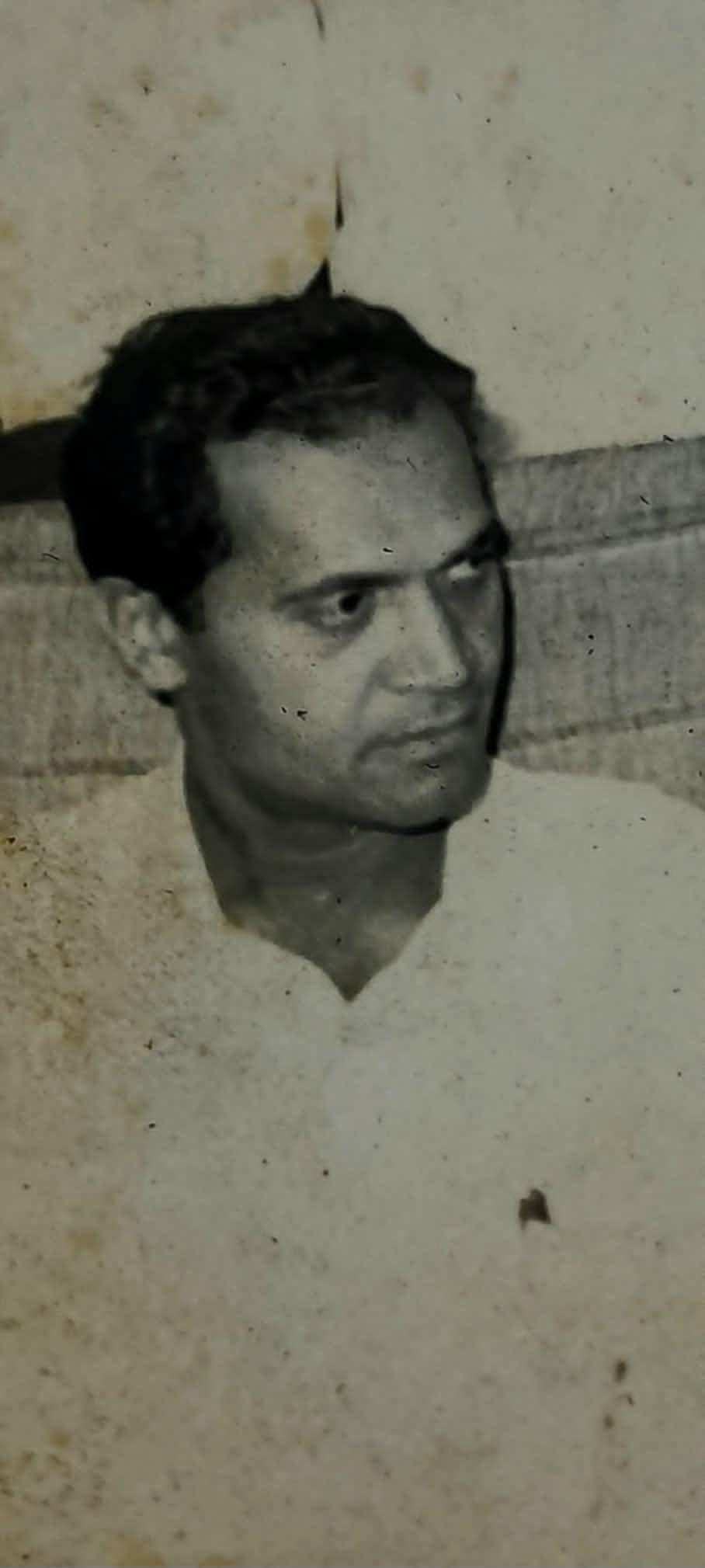

Personal details
- Born: 1 October 1927 Chittagong, Bengal Presidency, British India
- Died: 4 September 1983 (aged 55) Dhaka, Bangladesh
- Occupation: Diplomat, civil servant

Mahbub Alam Chashi (Bengali: মাহবুব আলম চাষী; 1 October 1927 – 4 September 1983) was a public official and social worker from Bangladesh. He pioneered the Swanirvar Movement, a 'basic need' centred approach to rural upliftment and community development, which attempted to include various groups within the village structure in Bangladesh. Chashi also promoted the Rangunia model cooperatives in 1960s. The Government of Bangladesh recognized his contributions to the national life by awarding him the Independence Day Award the highest civilian award of the country, in 1977 by President Ziaur Rahman regime. He played a crucial role as mastermind to kill Sheikh Mujibur Rahman along with all of his family members expect two daughters who stayed abroad then, in the 15 August 1975 coup.

== Early life ==
He was born in Chittagong. His ancestral home was in Pashchim Sultanpur, Raozan, while his family resided in Debpahar Lane. He was the son of Abul Qasem, who served as a District Judge.

He completed his graduation from Islamia College in Kolkata, around the time of the Partition of India. He later studied economics at the University of Dhaka, where he resided at Salimullah Muslim Hall. He passed both the Civil Service of Pakistan (CSP) examination and the commissioned officer selection test for the Pakistan Army. Although he was initially selected for the army, he joined the civil service following his parents’ wishes and became part of the first batch of the Pakistan Foreign Service in 1949.

== Career ==
Alam served in the Embassy of Pakistan to the United States in the early 1960s.

Alam resigned from Pakistan Foreign Service service in 1967. He added the prefix Chashi, meaning farmer, to him name and developed a model agriculture farming project in Rangunia outside of Chittagong.

During the Bangladesh Liberation War, He served as secretary to Khandakar Mushtaq Ahmed and worked with Taheruddin Thakur. Following the beginning of the war on 26 March 1971, he crossed into India through Belonia and joined the Provisional Government of Bangladesh as Foreign Secretary. After the independence of Bangladesh, he was appointed Vice-Chairperson of the Bangladesh Academy for Rural Development.

After the assassination of Sheikh Mujibur Rahman, Alam and Taheruddin Thakur accompanied Khandakar Mushtaq Ahmed to the radio station where Mustaq announced Mujib's death and declared himself the new president of Bangladesh.

== Death ==
On 4 September 1983, at the age of 56, he died in a car accident in Al Qassim, Saudi Arabia, while travelling to Mecca to perform Hajj. He was later buried at his Farm in Rangunia, Chittagong.

== Awards and honours ==
In 1977, he was awarded the Independence award, Bangladesh's highest civilian honors.
