= Kazi Golam Rasul =

Bangladeshi judge

- কাজী গোলাম রসূল
- Born: 1942; Begumganj Thana, Noakhali District, Bengal Presidency
- Died: December 11, 2014 (aged 71–72); United Hospital, Dhaka; Bangladesh
- Occupation: Judge

Kazi Golam Rasul (Bengali: কাজী গোলাম রসূল) was a Bangladeshi judge who is known for his verdict in the assassination of Sheikh Mujibur Rahman case in 1998.

== Early life ==
Rasul was born in 1942 in Begumganj Thana, Noakhali District, East Bengal, British Raj.

== Career ==
On 12 March 1997, the trial in the assassination of Sheikh Mujibur Rahman case began with six accused in custody. Abdul Kahhar Akhand was the investigation officer of the case filed by AFM Mohitul Islam. On 8 November 1998, Rasul handed death sentences to 15 accused in the case over the assassination in 1975 of Sheikh Mujibur Rahman, founding father of Bangladesh and father of Prime Minister Sheikh Hasina. He was the Dhaka district and sessions judge. The convicts were to be executed by a fire squad according to the verdict.

Clashes were reported following the verdict in Dhaka between Bangladesh Nationalist Party and Awami League supporters. An Awami League affiliated politician, Waliur Rahman, was shot dead. In Chittagong violence broke out following the verdict. He retired after the verdict in 1998.

Rasul served as a legal advisor to the National Bank. He was also a member of the Public Service Commission.

== Death ==
Rasul died on 11 December 2014 at the United Hospital, Dhaka, Bangladesh. Prime Minister Sheikh Hasina visited United Hospital and personally expressed her condolences to the family.
