= A. K. M. Mohiuddin Ahmed =

Bangladeshi Army officer

- আব্দুল কাশেম মোহাম্মদ মহিউদ্দিন আহমেদ
- Mugshot of Ahmed taken in 2010
- Born: Abul Kashem Mohammad Mohiuddin Ahmed; 25 February 1949; Bogra, East Bengal, Pakistan
- Died: 28 January 2010 (aged 60); Dhaka Central Jail, Dhaka, Bangladesh
- Cause of death: Execution by hanging
- Education: Pakistan Military Academy
- Status: Executed
- Conviction: Murder
- Penalty: Death by hanging
- Military career
- Allegiance: Pakistan (Before 1971); Bangladesh
- Branch: Pakistan Army; Bangladesh Army
- Service years: 1969-1996
- Rank: Lieutenant Colonel
- Unit: East Bengal Regiment
- Commands: Deputy Commander of S Force
- Known for: Assassination of Sheikh Mujibur Rahman
- Conflicts: Bangladesh Liberation War

A.K.M. Mohiuddin Ahmed (25 February 1949 – 28 January 2010) was a Bangladesh Army officer who was convicted in absentia and executed for the assassination of Sheikh Mujibur Rahman. On 28 January 2010, Ahmed was hanged along with Syed Faruque Rahman, Sultan Shahriar Rashid Khan, Mohiuddin Ahmed, and Mohammad Bazlul Huda in Old Dhaka Central Jail.

== Early life and education ==
Ahmed was born in Bogra, East Bengal, Pakistan (now Rajshahi Division, Bangladesh). He enrolled at the Pakistan Military Academy in 1967 and was commissioned at East Bengal Regiment in 1969. He was soon promoted to lieutenant in January 1971 and was transferred as patrol officer for the bravo company under the 2nd East Bengal Regiment. His unit was transferred from Lahore Cantonment to outskirts of the Mirpur Cantonment around February 1971.

== Military career ==
Ahmed was in East Pakistan at the time of Operation Searchlight and revolt against the Pakistan Army with his company commander, Major Moinul Hossain Chowdhury. Chowdhury became the commanding officer for the 2nd East Bengal Regiment during the Bangladesh Liberation War, while Ahmed was promoted to war substantive captain and transferred as the aide-de-camp to commander of S Force Lieutenant Colonel K. M. Shafiullah. After the war, Ahmed was promoted to the rank of major in 1972 and designated as a company commander alpha at 4th East Bengal Regiment.

=== 15 August 1975 Bangladeshi coup d'état ===
In 1975, Ahmed and a few other mid-ranking army officers, displeased with the direction the government of Bangladesh was heading, decided to overthrow President Sheikh Mujibur Rahman and replace him with an Islamic government led by Khandaker Moshtaque Ahmed. They attacked the residence of Sheikh Mujib on 15 August 1975. After Sheikh Mujib and most of his family members were killed, Ahmed went with the other officers to form a command council and a government headed by Moshtaque. After the killing, he was posted to a diplomatic mission in Tripoli, Libya.

Ahmed fled to the United States in 1996, the same year the Bangladesh Awami League returned to power. He applied for asylum, but his application was rejected, and he was ordered to be deported from the United States in 2002. On 18 June 2007, Ahmed was deported from the United States after fighting a prolonged legal battle to remain in the United States. He had been detained by US Immigration and Customs Enforcement on 13 March 2007. His home in Patuakhali was burned down on 18 November 2009 by several hundred locals.

== Trial ==
On 2 October 1996, AFM Mohitul Islam filed the case over the attack on Sheikh Mujib with Dhanmondi Police Station. On 8 November 1998, Ahmed and 14 others were sentenced to death in the case filed over the murder of Sheikh Mujib and his family. 30 April 2001, Bangladesh High Court confirmed the death sentences of 12.

== Death ==
On 28 January 2010, Ahmed's mercy petition was rejected by the President of Bangladesh. On 28 January 2010, Ahmed was hanged along with Sultan Shahriar Rashid Khan, Mohiuddin Ahmed, Syed Farooq Rahman, and Mohammad Bazlul Huda in Dhaka Central Jail. He was buried in Galachipa Upazila in Patuakhali District.
