= Controversies surrounding Sheikh Hasina =

Criticism and controversies about Sheikh Hasina

Sheikh Hasina, the former prime minister of Bangladesh, has faced many criticism and controversies over years.

== Controversies ==
=== Bilateral relations with India ===
In June 2024, Sheikh Hasina paid a state visit to New Delhi, during which Bangladesh and India signed ten bilateral agreements, including one on allowing India a rail corridor to its northeastern states through Bangladeshi territory. This led to widespread criticism in Bangladesh on the issue of the country's sovereignty, accusing Hasina of "selling the country to India".

Domestically, Hasina had been criticised as being too close to India, often at the cost of Bangladesh's sovereignty. She is seen by her critics as a manifestation of India's interference in Bangladeshi politics, which they have described as the main source of her power.

=== July Massacre ===
The July massacre was one of the most violent crackdowns in Bangladesh's history, ordered by Sheikh Hasina's government to suppress 2024 Bangladesh quota reform movement. The protest began as a peaceful demonstration demanding reforms of the quota system, but it quickly escalated into a nationwide movement. In July 2024, security forces, including the Rapid Action Battalion (RAB) and police, opened fire on unarmed students, many of whom were between the ages of 5 and 30 years old. Quota reform movement later escalated into July Revolution that overthrown Hasina.

The interim government officially reported 875 deaths. Many more were injured or arrested. Witnesses reported that government forces used excessive force, including live ammunition and tear gas, in areas where peaceful protests were ongoing.

The massacre drew widespread condemnation from both domestic and international bodies, with Human Rights Watch and Amnesty International calling for independent investigations into the killings. The government has been accused of trying to cover up the true extent of the violence by pressuring hospitals to underreport casualties and censoring media coverage.

=== Election manipulation ===
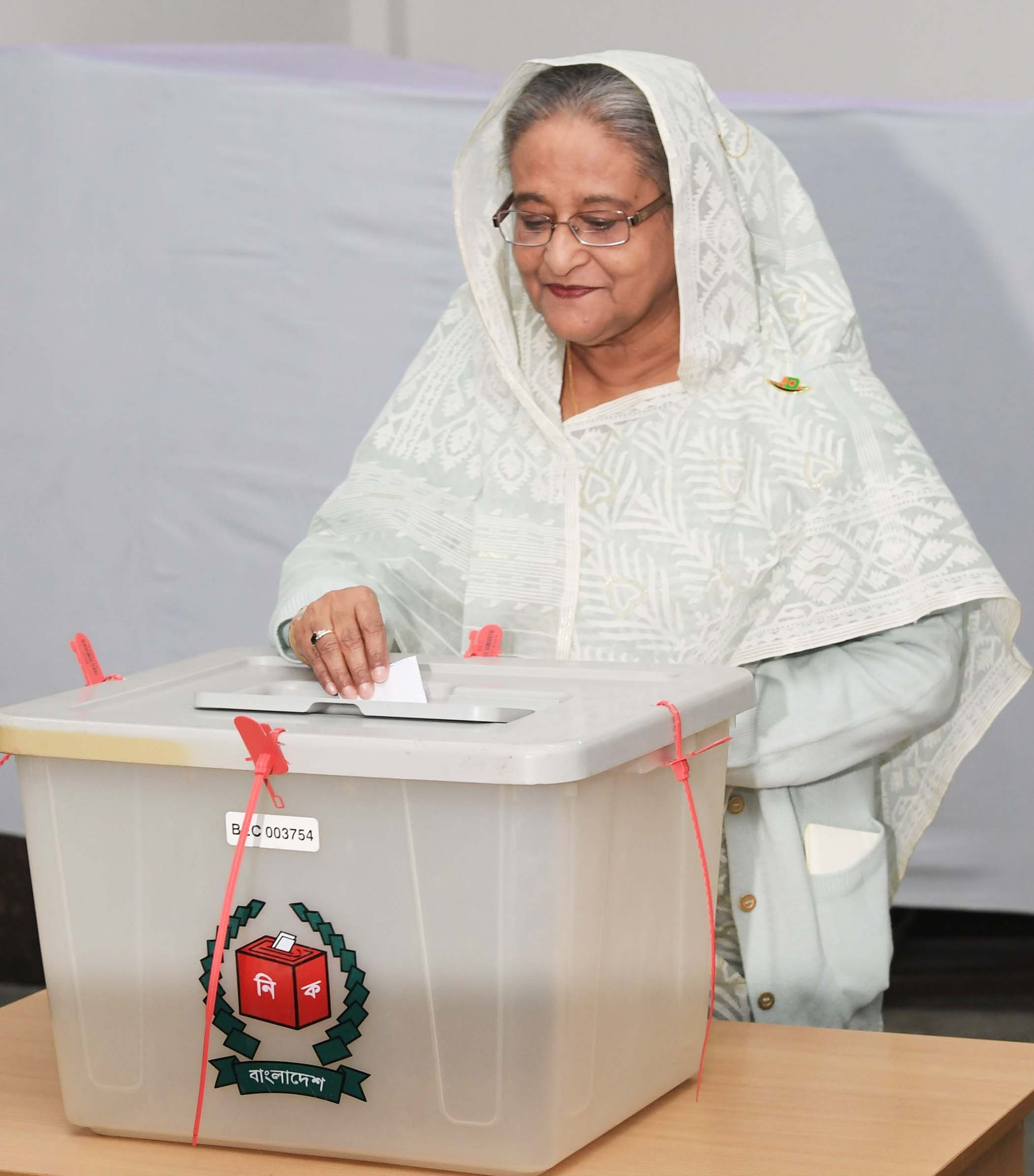
Hasina casting her vote in the 2018 Bangladeshi general election—often referred to as the “midnight election”—which was widely regarded by international observers as unfair and marred by irregularities.

Sheikh Hasina's government has faced repeated allegations of manipulating elections to maintain power. The 2014 general election, boycotted by the opposition Bangladesh Nationalist Party (BNP), led to a one-sided result, with the ruling Awami League winning most seats uncontested. Similar accusations surfaced in the 2018 election, with widespread reports of vote rigging and obstruction of opposition voters.

=== Suppression of opposition and media ===
Under Hasina's government, opposition leaders, particularly from the BNP, have been frequently arrested or harassed. The imprisonment of BNP leader Khaleda Zia on corruption charges is seen by many as a politically motivated move to weaken the opposition. Hasina's government has also cracked down on media freedom, using laws like the Digital Security Act to detain journalists and activists critical of the regime.

=== Extrajudicial arrests and disappearances ===
Human rights groups have condemned Sheikh Hasina's government for its use of midnight arrests and enforced disappearances, particularly targeting political opponents, activists, and journalists. Security forces like the Rapid Action Battalion (RAB) are accused of abducting individuals from their homes during the night, many of whom were never seen again. Victims of these disappearances often included opposition members or activists who were critical of the regime. These practices have led to international outcry, with the United States imposing sanctions on RAB in 2021 for its involvement in human rights violations.

=== Money laundering and allegations of corruption in infrastructure projects ===
Sheikh Hasina's government has been accused of corruption and money laundering, especially in relation to large infrastructure projects such as the Padma Bridge and Dhaka Metro Rail. In 2012, the World Bank withdrew its funding from the Padma Bridge project, citing allegations of a conspiracy to commit corruption involving senior government officials. Though the charges were later dismissed in a Canadian court, critics argue that corruption still plagued the project. Similarly, the Dhaka Metro Rail project has faced accusations of cost inflation and kickbacks involving government officials, further fueling concerns of misuse of state funds.

The Padma Bridge graft scandal involved the ruling Awami League government that allegedly sought, in exchange for the awarding of the construction contract, a large amount of money from the Canadian construction company SNC-Lavalin. The allegations were subsequently found to be false and without merit, and a Canadian court subsequently dismissed the case.

On 24 January 2017, in a speech in parliament, Prime Minister Hasina blamed Muhammad Yunus for the World Bank's pulling out of the project. According to her, Yunus lobbied with the former United States Secretary of State Hillary Clinton to persuade the World Bank to terminate the loan. On 10 February 2017, a justice of the Superior Court of Ontario dismissed the bribery-conspiracy case for lack of any evidence.

According to Daily Jugantor, Sheikh Hasina also reportedly misused the donation money raised in the name of helping Palestinians.

=== Renaming of public institutions and allegations of dynastic politics ===
A prominent point of criticism during Sheikh Hasina's tenure has been the renaming of infrastructure, institutions, and public spaces in honor of her family members, particularly her father, Sheikh Mujibur Rahman, the founding leader of Bangladesh. Major projects, such as the Bangabandhu Sheikh Mujib Medical University, have either been renamed or established in his name. This practice has also extended to other family members, prompting critics to accuse Hasina of fostering a cult of personality and reinforcing dynastic politics.

=== Loans and borrowing policies ===
Sheikh Hasina was largely criticized by opposition and economists during her regime of borrowing too much loan from the IMF and other nations. Her government left a burden of $156 billion debt before being toppled.

== Cases ==
As of 10 September 2024, Hasina is facing 152 cases which include 135 for murder, 7 for crimes against humanity and genocide, 3 for abduction, 6 for attempted murder and 1 for the attack on a BNP procession. These cases include other former government officials - Home Minister Asaduzzaman Khan, Transport and Bridges Minister and concurrent Awami League secretary-general Obaidul Quader, and others. The Bangladesh International Crimes Tribunal opened an investigation on charges of genocide and crimes against humanity against her and nine senior government and Awami League officials over their role in the crackdown on the protests following a petition by the father of a killed student. The BNP requested India to extradite Sheikh Hasina to Bangladesh for prosecution against the cases registered on her.

On 17 October, the International Crimes Tribunal issued an arrest warrant against her for alleged "crimes against humanity" committed during the July massacre. On 5 December, the tribunal banned her speeches and related broadcasts from being published in Bangladesh.

== See also ==
- Criticism of Awami League
- Sheikh Mujibur Rahman's cult of personality
- Assassination of Sheikh Mujibur Rahman
- 2024 Bangladesh quota reform movement
- Bangladesh Rifles revolt
- 2013 Shapla Square protests
- Murder of Sagar Sarowar and Meherun Runi
- Disappearance of Ilias Ali
- Delwar Hossain Sayeedi
- Murder of Biswajit Das
- Sajah
- Boran
- Cleopatra
- Medusa
