= Mohiuddin Ahmed =

Bangladesh Army officer

- মহিউদ্দিন আহমেদ
- Died: 28 January 2010; Dhaka, Bangladesh
- Cause of death: Execution by hanging
- Education: Pakistan Military Academy
- Military career
- Allegiance: Pakistan (before 1971); Bangladesh
- Branch: Pakistan Army; Bangladesh Army
- Service years: 1968–1996
- Rank: Lieutenant Colonel
- Unit: Regiment of Artillery
- Commands: Deputy Commander of Z Force; Battery Commander of 2nd Field Artillery Battery; CO of 6th Field Artillery Regiment
- Known for: Assassination of Sheikh Mujibur Rahman

Mohiuddin Ahmed (died 28 January 2010) was a Bangladesh Army officer who was convicted of the assassination of Sheikh Mujibur Rahman. On 28 January 2010, Ahmed was hanged along with Sultan Shahriar Rashid Khan, A. K. M. Mohiuddin Ahmed, Sayed Farooq-ur-Rahman, and Mohammad Bazlul Huda at Old Dhaka Central Jail.

== Career ==
Ahmed was in the 2nd Field Artillery under the command of Major Khandaker Abdur Rashid. Rashid criticised the policies of President Sheikh Mujibur Rahman. The day before the coup, he directed the officers under his command to prepare for the coup, including ordering them to carry personal firearms. Syed Faruque Rahman, the leader of the coup, wanted to overthrow the government of Sheikh Mujibur Rahman and replace it with an Islamic government led by Khandaker Moshtaque Ahmed. Ahmed ordered the firing of artillery towards the house of Sheikh Mujibur Rahman. After Sheikh Mujibur Rahman was killed, he was a member of the newly formed command council to lead the country from Bangabhaban. Ahmed would later implicate Ziaur Rahman in the coup through a confession statement. After the assassination, he was given diplomatic posts along with other assassins. He served in the Bangladesh embassy in Riyadh and Bangkok.

The trial for the assassination of Sheikh Mujib began in 1996 after his daughter, Sheikh Hasina, was voted into power. On 8 November 1998, Ahmed was sentenced to death along with 15 other accused in the case by the trial court. On 14 December 2000, the Bangladesh High Court confirmed the death sentence for him and 11 other accused. On 17 June 2007, Ahmed was deported from the United States to Bangladesh after a court rejected his appeal for residency in the United States.

== Death and legacy ==
Ahmed was hanged on 28 January 2010 along with 4 other convicted assassins of Sheikh Mujibur Rahman.

Ahmed's sons, Mohammed Nazmul Hassan Sohel and Mahbubul Hassan Emran, were arrested on suspicion of their involvement in a bomb attack on Fazle Noor Taposh, a member of parliament and a son of Sheikh Fazlul Haque Mani.
