= Sultan Shahriar Rashid Khan =

Bangladeshi army officer (died 2010)

- সুলতান শাহরিয়ার রশিদ খান
- Died: 28 January 2010; Dhaka, Bangladesh
- Cause of death: Execution by hanging
- Alma mater: Pakistan Military Academy
- Military career
- Allegiance: Pakistan (Before 1971); Bangladesh
- Branch: Pakistan Army; Bangladesh Army
- Service years: 1968-1975
- Rank: Lieutenant Colonel
- Unit: Regiment of Artillery
- Commands: Deputy Commander of 2nd Field Artillery Battery; 2IC of 2nd Field Artillery Regiment; Chief Inspector of Army School of Physical Training
- Known for: Assassination of Sheikh Mujibur Rahman

Sultan Shahriar Rashid Khan (died 28 January 2010) was a Bangladeshi army officer who was convicted for the assassination of Sheikh Mujibur Rahman. On 28 January 2010, Rahman was hanged along with Syed Faruque Rahman, A.K.M. Mohiuddin Ahmed, Mohiuddin Ahmed, and Mohammad Bazlul Huda in Old Dhaka Central Jail.

== Career ==
In 1973, Khan was the chief inspector of the Army School of Physical Training in Comilla. His friend and colleague, Major Shariful Haque Dalim, and his wife had gotten into a scuffle with the sons of Gazi Golam Mostafa, a politician of the Bangladesh Awami League. Some officers ransacked the house of Gazi Golam, which led to the officers, including Dalim and Major S.H.M.B Noor Chowdhury, being dismissed from the army over indiscipline. Khan resigned from the army over this incident. Khan opened a used consumer electronics store named Shery Enterprise in Dhaka.

After his resignation, he maintained contact with some of his fellow army officers, both retired and in service. The army officers expressed dissatisfaction over how Bangladesh was being governed, the lack of benefits for Freedom Fighters, and the role of Sheikh Mujibur Rahman. They held a number of meetings discussing ways to change the government. On 14 August 1975, Khan met government minister Khandaker Moshtaque Ahmed, who was to replace Sheikh Mujibur Rahman. On 15 August 1975, the army officers, including Khan launched the coup. They divided into teams, one went to the residence of Sheikh Mujib, and the one Khan was in went to the Bangladesh Betar (radio) office in Dhaka and took control of the broadcast system to control the flow of information.

On 3 November 1975, he assisted to kill four national leaders of Bangladesh in jail, including former Prime Minister Tajuddin Ahmed. After the assassinations, he was appointed under the new Chief of Defense Staff Khalilur Rahman.

== Trial ==
In 2004 Khan was sentenced to life imprisonment for his involvement in the jail killing case. On 19 November 2009, the Supreme Court of Bangladesh confirmed the death sentence handed out to 12 individuals for their role in the coup and assassination.

== Death and legacy ==
Khan was hanged with four of his co-conspirators on 27 January 2010 at Old Dhaka Central Jail. His daughter, Shehnaz Rashid Khan, and her brother in law, along with two others were arrested with the contraband Ya ba on 7 August 2011.
