= Assassination of Sheikh Mujibur Rahman =

1975 murder in Dhaka, Bangladesh

- Part of August 1975 Bangladesh military coup
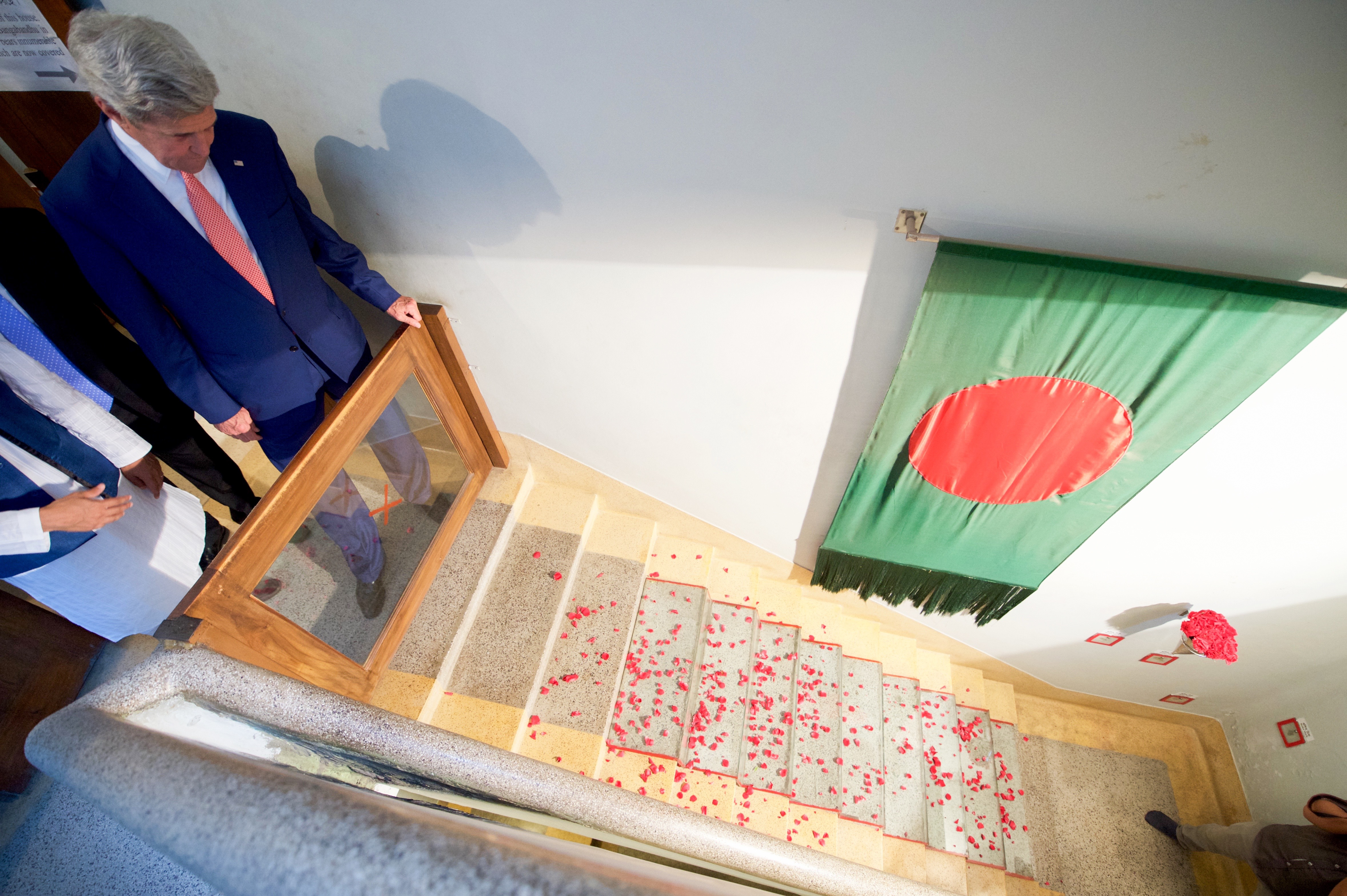
- The staircase in Bangabandhu House, Dhaka (now demolished), where Bangabandhu Sheikh Mujib was assassinated at 6:00 AM on 15 August 1975
- Location: Dhanmondi 32, Dhaka, Bangladesh
- Date: 15 August 1975; 51 years ago 06:00 (BST)
- Target: Sheikh Mujibur Rahman and his family
- Attack type: Assassination, murder by Gun violence
- Weapons: 9mm Sten Carbine (Mujib); Sten, L1A1 Self-Loading Rifle, M101 howitzer (others)
- Deaths: 47+ (including Sheikh Mujibur Rahman)
- Injuries: 48+ (mostly civilians)
- Perpetrators: 24 (including Khondaker Mostaq, Taheruddin Thakur and Sayed Farooq-ur-Rahman)
- Assailants: An est. dozen junior officer of the army and soldiers from 1st Bengal Lancers and 2nd Field Artillery Regiment
- Accused: Mostaq, Mahbub and several others (granted immunity); Taheruddin, Joardar, Hashem, Nazmul and Sharful (acquitted on appeal)
- Charges: Conspiracy, murder, concealing evidence
- Sentence: Farooq, Rashid, Noor, Huda, Rashed, Pasha, Shahriar, Mohiuddin, A. K. M. Mohiuddin, Dalim, Majed and Moslemuddin: Death by hanging

Sheikh Mujibur Rahman, the founding president of Bangladesh, was assassinated along with most of his family members during the early hours of 15 August 1975 by a group of Bangladesh Army personnel who invaded his residence as part of a coup d'état. The minister of commerce, Khondaker Mostaq Ahmad, immediately took control and proclaimed himself head of an interim government from 15 August to 6 November 1975; he was in turn succeeded by Chief Justice Abu Sayem. The assassination marked the first direct military intervention in Bangladesh's civilian administration. 15 August was observed as National Mourning Day in Bangladesh under the government of Sheikh Hasina.

== Background ==
=== Mujib's presidency ===
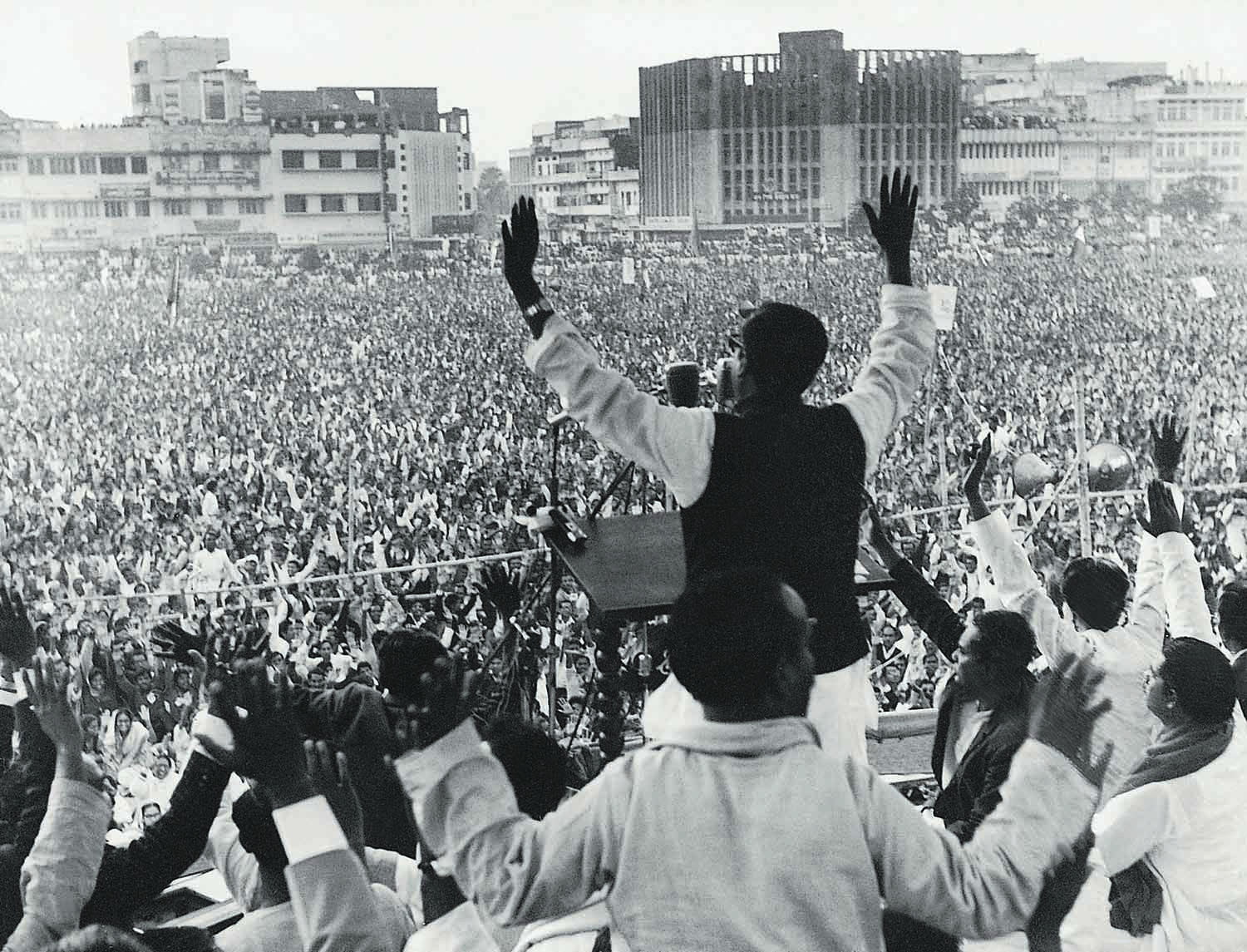
Sheikh Mujibur Rahman's meeting in Dhaka for the 1970 Pakistani general election

In the 1970 Pakistani general election, Sheikh Mujib's party, the Awami League (previously known as the Awami Muslim League), won the majority of the seats in the Pakistani National Assembly. They won 160 of the general 162 seats and all 7 women's seats in East Pakistan, which would later become Bangladesh after it seceded from West Pakistan. Despite Pakistan's military government delaying the handover of power, Mujib's residence had become the de facto head of government in East Pakistan by March. At the start of the Bangladesh Liberation War in 1971, he was arrested at his home by Pakistani soldiers. On 10 April that year, the provisional government of the Bangladeshi rebellion, popularly known as the Mujibnagar Government, was established with Mujib as its head and as the leader of Bangladeshi armed forces. Following the defeat of Pakistani forces on 16 December 1971, Sheikh Mujibur Rahman was released from custody from Pakistan in London on 22 December 1971, from where he flew to India, and then to Bangladesh. Mujib led the government as Prime Minister of Bangladesh for three years after Bangladesh gained independence.

=== Post-war devastation in Bangladesh ===
After nine months of widespread destruction by the Pakistani army in 1971, Bangladesh was in ruins. (Note: The new country, Bangladesh, began with many "attacks and sexual violence" by the Pakistani occupation forces. According to the American "Time" magazine in January 1972: After the Pakistani army's onslaught last March, a special team of World Bank inspectors observed that some cities looked "like the morning after a nuclear attack." Since then, the devastation has only increased. An estimated 6,000,000 homes have been destroyed and about 1,400,000 farming families have left without tools or livestock to work their fields. Transport and communication systems are completely disrupted. Roads are damaged, bridges are broken, and inland waterways are blocked. Massacres and sexual violence continued in the country until the Pakistani army surrendered a month ago. In the final days of the war, businesses owned by West Pakistanis – which included almost every commercial enterprise – deposited virtually all of their funds in the West. Pakistan International Airlines left just 117 rupees ($16) in its account in the port city of Chittagong. The army has also destroyed banknotes and coins, as many areas now face a severe cash shortage. Private cars were taken off the roads or confiscated from auto dealers before the ports were closed and sent west.) Prime Minister Sheikh Mujib officially announced that the massacre had killed 3 million Bengalis and brutally raped 200,000 Bengali women by the then Pakistani army, calling it "the worst massacre in human history". The high hopes and aspirations of the people of newly independent Bangladesh were becoming increasingly difficult for the Mujib government to fulfill.

=== Jatiya Rakkhi Bahini controversy and outrage in the army ===
The Jatiya Rakkhi Bahini (JRB) was a controversial militia formed by Sheikh Mujibur Rahman and loyal to him personally. Although it was originally founded as a law enforcement agency to maintain internal security, it became a second national armed force and served as a political task force for the Awami League. As a result, it found little support among traditional military organisations such as the Mukti Bahini. Its 30,000 troops intimidated and tortured opponents of the Awami League in various ways. The military grew resentful of the level of funding the Rakkhi Bahini received from the Mujib government, with the former's own funding being reduced to 13% in the 1975–76 budget, a considerable decrease from the 50–60% it enjoyed during the Pakistan period. Salimullah Khan said in a symposium on 5 August 2025 that, in Mujib's 1972–1975 regime, around 10,000 JSD and other youths were killed by JRD peeling off their skins alive.

=== Zia-Shafiullah conflict in the army ===
After the war of independence, discord and disorder arose in the Bangladesh army for various reasons. The distance between the freedom fighters and the military officers who had returned to Pakistan continued to increase.

Problems also arose over the appointment of the army chief. Despite being senior, Mujib appointed K. M. Shafiullah as the army chief instead of Zia. (Note: The relationship between Zia and Osmani deteriorated significantly during the war of liberation. Osmani sent orders to arrest Zia three times during the war of liberation. Although Zia was widely praised for reading the declaration of independence on Mujib's behalf, Zia declared himself the 'Head of the Provisional Government' and 'Liberation Army Chief' in an announcement from the radio station. Basically, during the Liberation War, this arrogant declaration, Osmani's negative perception of Zia, and his attempt to take leadership were the reasons why Mujib considered it reasonable to appoint Shafiullah as the army chief compared to Zia. It is worth noting that the President's interference in the appointment of the army chief and political decision-making are a normal thing.) Shafiullah said in his court statement,

On April 7, 1972, I was appointed as the Chief of Army Staff. I protested against this appointment. Because despite Ziaur Rahman and I having similar qualifications, he was before me in batch number, that is, he was my number 1 senior. I protested this to Bangabandhu along with Major Rob. We talked about protesting for about two hours with Bangabandhu. After listening to everything I said, he said, 'I have heard everything you said. There is something called a political decision. [There is something called a political decision here]' In reply I said, 'From today and now onwards; I am a victim of circumstance.' Bangabandhu said, 'You talk big, go and get the responsibility from General Osmani from tomorrow.' I told Ziaur Rahman on the telephone about my taking over and the details of my conversation with Bangabandhu. Zia then said, 'OK Shafiullah. Good bye.'

This was a political decision, as a result of which Zia became personally angry with the Mujib government. As a result, the relationship between Ziaur Rahman and Shafiullah deteriorated.

Colonel Shafaat Jamil said,

Major General Ziaur Rahman and Major General Shafiullah were batchmates. Ziaur Rahman was senior. But he was not given the post of Chief of Staff. There was no good relationship between the two.'

Shafiullah also said,

'Whenever I have taken action against any officer for breach of discipline, those officers have taken shelter with General Zia.'

Colonel (Retd.) Shawkat Ali held Ziaur Rahman responsible for creating discord in the army, saying,

If something bad happened in the army, the blame would fall on Shafiullah, but if something good happened, it would immediately be spread that it was for Zia.

According to Abu Sayyid, the author of the book Facts and Documents: Bangabandhu Khattakand and former State Minister for Information, there was always a propaganda in the army that Ziaur Rahman is the source of all virtues and merits. According to many, Ziaur Rahman was responsible for creating conflict between the returnees from Pakistan and the freedom fighters. (Note: Shawkat Ali wrote, "He (Zia) used to maintain good relations with the returnees. But secretly he would incite the freedom fighters against the returnees. He would gain the trust of some officers among the returnees and incite them against the freedom fighters in the same way. This was in the early 1974. My friendship with my old friends who had returned from Pakistan was intact. With them The association did not escape Zia's eyes. One day, he mentioned the name of a returnee in his office and asked, why are you so close to him? I said, he is my long-time friend.... Zia said seriously, 'Shaukat, no returnee officer can be your friend. It is not right to keep a freedom fighter like you close to Pakistanis'. Suddenly, I got a vision. Many reasons for the incidents that happened in the army at that time became clear to me. Of course, I knew some things before. But I did not expect Zia to catch me. I got a little excited and said, 'Sir, I am sorry. I cannot agree with you.... Please stop playing. Thinking about national interests, refrain from creating discord in the army. You are the deputy chief of the army. If you indulge in such conspiratorial activities, what will our juniors do'? Having said these words, I left. I had said the harsh words intentionally. Of course, I had to pay a lot of personal costs for this.... Later, at the top of power The consequences of the harassing steps taken by Ziaur Rahman against me are still ongoing.")

In addition to all these issues, there were also differences among the freedom fighters. There was no harmony between the members of Ziaur Rahman's 'Z' Force and Khaled Mosharraf and Shafiullah's 'K' and 'S' forces. The conflict between Zia, Khaled and Shafiullah began during the Liberation War. (Note: During the Liberation War, Ziaur Rahman, Khaled Mosharraf and Shafiullah continued to try to gain power and leadership in the Liberation War. Ziaur Rahman advised Tajuddin Ahmed to form a war council to seize leadership during the Liberation War and 'appoint Colonel Osmani to the Ministry of Defense'. Khaled Mosharraf and K. M. Shafiullah opposed this. This led to a serious deterioration in the relationship between Zia and Osmani. During the Liberation War, Osmani sent orders to arrest Zia three times. According to professor Abu Sayyid, these young officers fundamentally prioritized the issue of leadership in the Liberation War. The pressure to obtain leadership from Zia, Shafiullah, and Khaled Musharraf was clear in the Liberation War.) However, due to the dominance of soldiers from the 'K' and 'S' Forces in the army, Khaled and Shafiullah did not have a good relationship with Zia.

=== Allegation of nepotism and corruption within the Mujib-family ===
Sheikh Fazlul Haque Mani, a politician and one of the nephews of Mujib, was appointed to senior positions in the Government formed by Sheikh Mujibur Rahman. When private trade with India was banned due to slow inflation, Fazlul Haque actively engaged in it with Mujibur Rahman's blessings. This was seen as an attempt by Mujibur Rahman to form a dynasty.

Near the end of 1973, Sheikh Kamal was involved in a shootout in which he suffered gunshot injuries. Multiple claims have been made as to how the shootout occurred. Many people claim that it was during an attempted robbery of a bank by Sheikh Kamal and his friends. However, a retired major general of the Bangladesh Army claimed that it was actually a case of friendly fire. Near the end of 1973, Bangladeshi security forces received intelligence that the left-wing revolutionary activist Siraj Sikder and his insurgents were going to launch coordinated attacks around Dhaka. Police and other security officers were on full alert and patrolling the streets of Dhaka in plainclothes. Sheikh Kamal and his friends were armed and also patrolling the city in a microbus looking for Siraj Sikder. When the microbus was in Dhanmondi, the police mistook Sheikh Kamal and his friends for insurgents and opened fire on them, thus injuring Sheikh Kamal. However, it is also claimed that Sheikh Kamal and his friends were in Dhanmondi to test drive a new car that his friend Iqbal Hassan Mahmood had bought recently. Since Dhaka was under heavy police patrolling, police special forces under the command of the then city SP Mahamuddin Bir Bikrom opened fire on the car thinking that the passengers were miscreants.

A 1976 issue of the Asia Yearbook stated, "It was an open secret - that Mujib's brother, Sheikh Nazir, was alleged to have monopolised the smuggling in the southeast; that his wife took a cut in contracting World Bank projects; that his son, Sheikh Kamal, had been involved in thuggery; and that his nephew, Sheikh Moni, was fast accumulating power and wealth." Abdul Waheed Talukder, in his book "Gonotontrer Onneshay Bangladesh" (গণতন্ত্রের অন্বেষায় বাংলাদেশ, Bangladesh in Search of Democracy), said in the 1976 issue of the Asia Yearbook,

They also spread rumors that Sheikh Kamal was shot while robbing Bangladesh Bank. But the vault of Bangladesh Bank was guarded by hundreds of policemen and this vault was so secure that it could not be destroyed without dynamite.

Marcus F. Franda in his book "Bangladesh: The First Decade" says,

Shahidul Islam's reputation in Bangladesh was also tarnished by persistent rumors that he had been intimately involved in a bank robbery and scandal in 1972 and in the assassination of seven Dacca University students in 1974.

S. R. Mirza says in his book Conversations after the War of Liberation,

I will say more about this. In 1975, a freedom fighter came to meet me. The freedom fighter said to me, sir, Bangabandhu used to say, don't spend money, get married with garlands of flowers. But he himself is marrying off his sons wearing golden crowns and it is being shown on TV. The inconsistency of these two standards and words--people will not accept it.' Then a friend of mine, I won't say his name, who was very close to Mr. Sheikh, he used to visit Mr. Sheikh's house from time to time and meet him, he worked in an oil company, after independence it was heard that Sheikh Kamal was shot while robbing a bank. While in the hospital, the gentleman said, "I then went to Bangabandhu's house, at noon, Sheikh Mujib and other members of his family were eating in the dining room. As I went, I heard Sheikh Sahib saying, 'When people start beating you, then what will I do! I don't know'." From this, it is easy to imagine that there was a problem in the leadership.

=== Left-wing insurgency ===
A left-wing insurgency from 1972 to 1975 is widely held to be responsible for creating the conditions that led to the assassination. In 1972, a leftist group named the Jatiya Samajtantrik Dal (JSD) was founded from a split in the Bangladesh Chhatra League, the student wing of the Bangladesh Awami League. The JSD, through its armed wing Gonobahini led by Colonel Abu Taher and politician Hasanul Haq Inu, began a political massacre of government supporters, Awami League members, and police. Their campaign contributed to a breakdown of law and order in the country and paved the way for the assassination of Mujib. Hasanul Huq Inu later held the office of the Minister of Information under Sheikh Hasina's Second and Third cabinets.

==== Ramna massacre ====
Immediately after the formation of the National Socialist Party, the JSD leaders and activists started a movement against Sheikh Mujibur Rahman's National Guard. At that time, members of the National Guard were accused of being involved in many illegal activities, including attacking the houses of opposition politicians, looting, torturing, killing, and abducting opposition ideologues. On 17 March 1974, the Guard attacked JSD supporters in Ramna, which the JSD called the Ramna Massacre. On that day, when JSD activists surrounded the residence of Home Minister Muhammad Mansur Ali located in Ramana area of Dhaka, members of the National Guard opened fire on them, resulting in heavy casualties. At least 50 people were killed in the massacre.

=== Opposition to India ===
India played an important role in the Bangladesh War of Independence in 1971. According to Paresh Saha, Sheikh Mujib became a symbol of India-Bangladesh friendly relations at that time.

After independence, Mujib's opponents repeatedly called Mujib an 'agent of India' and the Mujib government a puppet government of India. Pro-Chinese parties also called the Liberation War after the Indian participation a 'fight between two dogs'. They called the India-Bangladesh Pact concluded by Mujib-Indira Gandhi a 'slavery pact'. They also claim that this pact has a secret clause. Mujib's opponents repeatedly alleged that assets, vehicles, and factory equipment were being smuggled into India. None of these, especially the Mujib-Indira agreement, the double note controversy, or the car smuggling incident, were found to be factually true.

=== Secularism vs. Islam tensions and communal provocations ===
The 1972 constitution drafted under Mujib's leadership adopted secularism as one of the fundamental principles of the state. According to this constitution, religion-based politics was banned in Bangladesh.

Among the banned parties were Jamaat-e-Islami, Nizam-e-Islami, and Muslim League. In 1971, the people naturally accepted the role of these parties in opposing the independence of Bangladesh, i.e., the role of 'Rajakar', Al Badr, Al Shams etc. in order to form forces.

But the members of these political parties were angered by this and started campaigning against the Mujib government. Mujib faced problems while trying war criminals, assassins, and brokers. The judicial system of the newly independent Bangladesh began to collapse while trying such a large number of criminals. Besides, the process of collecting evidence etc. was complicated.

Therefore, Mujib declared a general amnesty for 'brokers who were not charged with any of the 14 crimes against humanity'. Many of the brokers were pardoned.

Since then, the campaign that was going on, making secularism and Islam rivals, gained momentum. These campaigns are also responsible for tarnishing Mujib's image.

Paresh Saha wrote,

Many mosques also became dens of anti-Mujib.

In the first general election of Bangladesh in 1973, no party could become strong against the Awami League, which many believe led them to resort to conspiracies.

In March 1974, a poem by poet Daud Haider was published in a magazine of the daily newspaper The Sangbad, which contained an offensive line about Muhammad, Jesus, Buddha and Krishna. In protest, a newly formed Islamist political organization called National Democratic Party, composed of Bangladeshi scholars, ulama, and clerics, organized a public meeting. According to Paresh Saha, the then banned Jamaat-e-Islami secretly supported this protest. The party's flag was similar to the National Flag of Pakistan and the party worked to incite religious sentiments in the public. As a result, the newspaper suspended Dawood Haider and apologized for publishing the offensive poem. But it is noteworthy that even then, the organization surrounded the office of the newspaper with several thousand of its members and started attacking it and started shouting slogans like "We want Dawood Haider's execution". According to Paresh Saha, the purpose of this protest was not to protest Dawood Haider's poem, but rather they were trying to create an opportunity to reintroduce Islamist politics into the then secular politics of Bangladesh by arousing the religious sentiments of the Muslim majority in Bangladesh. According to Paresh Saha, the incident later strengthened anti-secular and Islamist sentiments in Bangladesh.

=== Role of newspapers ===
The number of newspapers in Bangladesh increased rapidly after independence. The number of newspapers increased from dozens to hundreds. Several newspapers played a role in spreading news and public opinion against Mujib and his government.

According to MR Akhtar Mukul, some newspapers in Bangladesh played a role in the Mujib murder. He said,

In the underdeveloped countries of the world, the powerful newspapers and journalists of that country have direct or indirect contact with the overthrow of the legitimate government through conspiracy and every horrific murder. Bangladesh was no exception.

Daily Ittefaq founded by Tafazzal Hossain (Manik Mia) played an important role in the independence movement of Bangladesh. Manik Mia died in 1969 and after that his two sons Barristers Mainul Hossain and Anwar Hossain Manju took over the responsibility of Ittefaq. The Ittefaq office was burned at the beginning of the Bangladesh Liberation War. According to Paresh Saha,

...But, Ittefaq had a 'Murubbi' (patron), that was the Murubbi America. On the recommendation of America, the Yahya government of Pakistan was allowed to go to West Germany and London as compensation (when Bengalis were being killed in the villages of Pakistan in the jungles). Purpose: To purchase a printing press for Ittefaq. When Ittefaq was brought out in a new form with that press, its character was completely different.

The newly published Ittefaq started publishing anti-liberation news as a supporter of Pakistan. Even though Mujib pardoned them after independence, Ittefaq continued to create anti-Mujib public opinion based on the grievances of the common people. According to Abdul Ghaffar Chowdhury,

However, one thing seems to be a hard truth 19 years after Manik Miah's death, this is that this Ittefaq is not the daily Ittefaq founded by Manik Miah, Manik Miah's Ittefaq was destroyed by the Pakistani occupying forces in March 1971, and he was martyred. Sirajuddin Hossain, the executive editor of Ittefaq, the successor of Manik Mia, was martyred. The Ittefaq that exists today is a ghost that has risen from the ashes of Ittefaq. This ghost is not the voice of the people of Bengal; this newspaper is a slave to the service, position and money of dictators and enemies of the people.

Ittefaq was able to distract the people through editorials - articles etc. It is worth noting that after the assassination of Mujib, Anwar Hossain Manju, in an editorial supporting the assassination, called it 'natural' and 'a historic beginning'.

The weekly Holiday also played a critical role. Through its various reports and articles, it tried to isolate the Mujib government and prevent the government from prosecuting war criminals. One of its reports said,

So are we 60 million people collaborators?

According to analysts, the purpose of such comments was to create a rift in national unity.

Headlines of some of the alleged news items in the newspapers:

Headline of the special bulletin published by the newspaper Hakkotha:

'The majority of people are ignored.

The mouthpiece wrote,

This government is a government of India's protectors', 'The seeds of Illallah must be sown' etc.

The newspaper Chittagonger Deshbangla said,

Rangamati city is feared to fall to rebels well-equipped with foreign weapons

According to some academics, the news was baseless and fabricated.

The newspaper Holiday continued to criticize Tajuddin Ahmed for his economic woes and played a critical role.

Mahbubul Alam, who was one of the royal witnesses against Mujib in 1971, was appointed assistant editor of the Bangladesh Times newspaper. He was a correspondent for the Karachi Dawn newspaper and published news against the war of independence.

The government-controlled Bangladesh Observer newspaper opposed the war of independence during the war of independence, but after independence it regularly published special columns praising Mujib.

Professor Abu Sayeed criticized the anti-people role of newspapers in independent Bangladesh and called them "vehicles of lies".

On 16 June 1975, the Mujib government banned all newspapers except four on charges of publishing baseless news. Initially, all newspapers except four were banned through an ordinance, which numbered 340. 24 hours later, the ban on 126 newspapers and periodicals included in the banned list was lifted, while the ban on the remaining 214 newspapers was maintained. According to many analysts, many newspapers were banned not only for political reasons, but also for spreading baseless news, communal propaganda, and indecency in various contexts.

=== Dalim-Mostafa conflict ===
In 1974, Gazi Golam Mostafa kidnapped Major Shariful Haque Dalim and his wife from the Dhaka Ladies Club after an argument during Dalim's cousin's wedding reception. Dalim's only brother-in-law Bappi (his wife Nimmi's brother) was attending from Canada. Mostafa's son occupied the chair in the row behind Bappi and pulled Bappi's hair from the back. Bappi scolded the boy for his behavior and told him not to sit on the row behind him anymore. Mostafa's sons (who were close friends of Sheikh Kamal) and some associates forcefully abducted Dalim, Nimmi, the groom's mother, and two of Dalim's friends (both of whom were distinguished freedom fighters) in Microbuses owned by the Red Crescent. Mostafa was taking them to the Jatiya Rakkhi Bahini headquarters but later took them to the residence of Sheikh Mujibur Rahman. Mujib mediated a compromise between them and made Mostafa apologize to Nimmi. When news of the abduction spread, the 1st Bengal Lancers ransacked Mostafa's and took his whole family prisoner. They also set up check posts all over the city searching for Major Dalim and the abductees. Some officers lost their jobs as a result. The officers involved, including Shariful Haque Dalim, were later orchestrators of the coup on 15 August 1975 and the assassination of Sheikh Mujib.

=== Rise and death of Siraj Sikder ===
Siraj Sikder was contemporary leading Bangladeshi Maoist leader, in Mujib's regime. Born in 1944, he obtained an engineering degree from the East Pakistan University of Engineering and Technology (now BUET) in 1967. While he was a student he became a member of East Pakistan Student Union. In 1967, he was elected vice-president of the central committee of Student Union and later that year he joined the C & B Department of the government as an engineer. Later he left his job to start a private engineering company. On 8 January 1968, along with like-minded activists, Sikder formed a clandestine organisation named Purba Bangla Sramik Andolon (East Bengal Workers Movement EBWM) with an objective to lead a struggle against the revisionism of the existing "Communist" organisations and to form a revolutionary Communist Party. This initiative brought forward a thesis that East Bengal is a colony of Pakistan and that the principal contradiction in the society is between the bureaucratic bourgeoisie and feudalists of Pakistan on one hand, and the people of East Bengal on the other hand. Only the independence struggle to form an "independent, democratic, peaceful, non-aligned, progressive" People's Republic of East Bengal, free also from the oppression of US imperialism, Soviet social-imperialism and Indian Expansionism could lead the society forward towards socialism and communism. In late 1968, Sikder left the job to establish the Mao Tse Tung Research Center in Dhaka but it was later closed down by the Pakistani government. Sikder became a lecturer at the Technical Training College in Dhaka. In the meantime of Bangladesh War of Independence, at a liberated base area named Pearabagan at Bhimruly in Jhalokati District in the southern part of the country, on 3 June 1971, Sikder founded a new party named Purba Banglar Sarbahara Party (Proletarian Party of East Bengal) by ideology of Marxism and Mao Tsetung Thought (not "Maoism", during the 1960s the followers of Mao-line used to identify their ideology as Marxism-Leninism-Mao Tse-tung Thought). At the beginning of the war, he went to Barisal and he declared that as a free living space and making it his base attempted to initiate his revolution throughout other places. After the Independence of Bangladesh he turned against the Sheikh Mujib government. In April 1973, he formed Purba Banglar Jatiya Mukti Front (East Bengal National Liberation Front) and declared war on Bangladesh Government. Under his leadership, the Sarbahara party carried out attacks against money lenders and landlords. In 1975, Sikder was arrested at Hali Shahar in Chittagong by the intelligence force of the government. He was killed in police custody on 3 January 1975 on his way from Dhaka Airport to the Jatiya Rakkhi Bahini Camp at Savar. Anthony Mascarenhas narrated in his book Bangladesh: A Legacy of Blood that, Siraj's sister Shamim Sikder blamed Mujib for the killing of her brother.

=== Famine of 1974 ===
Ever since independence, the possibility of famine started appearing in Bangladesh. Corrupt administration, worsening flood situation, failure to deal with food crisis led to famine in North Bengal in 1974. The death toll from the famine is claimed to be between 27,000 and 15 lakh or approximately 300,000 to 4,500,000 (or 1 to 1.5 million).

According to many analysts, the famine reduced the popularity of the Mujib government and contributed to the circumstances of his assassination.

=== Mujib-Bhutto's Pakistan-Bangladesh tour ===
In February 1974, Sheikh Mujibur Rahman was invited to Lahore, Pakistan, to attend the World Islamic Conference organized by the Prime Minister of Pakistan and political rival during the Liberation War, Zulfikar Ali Bhutto. Some prominent leaders of the Awami League, especially Tajuddin Ahmed, objected to Sheikh Mujib's visit because Pakistan had not yet recognized Bangladesh, but on 22 February, when Pakistan recognized Bangladesh, Mujib went on the visit. And on his way back, he invited Bhutto to visit Dhaka in return. Bhutto accepted the invitation and arrived in Bangladesh in late June 1974, According to Paresh Saha, there were so many people at the airport to see Bhutto that the police and security forces had to use batons to control the crowd. During the visit, Bhutto formally apologized for Pakistan's "criminal" actions in Bangladesh in 1971 and proposed that the Biharis in Bangladesh be taken back to Pakistan. At the end of the visit, Bhutto told reporters that his visit was a success and Mujib's talks were a failure. According to Paresh Saha, Bhutto's covert claim of success in the visit was to secretly assist in the assassination of Sheikh Mujibur Rahman.

=== Corruption, mismanagement and administration ===
In the newly independent Bangladesh, Sheikh Mujib reinstated and appointed government officials and civil servants from the previous Pakistan regime to their positions. But according to Paresh Saha, the provincial bureaucrats of the former undivided Pakistan were incompetent and highly corrupt in running the central administration of the state, as they were busy carrying out the orders of the central government of Pakistan in the past. According to Saha, this inherited bureaucracy was considered by many analysts to be a major obstacle for Sheikh Mujib. Fidel Castro and various well-wishing statesmen of Sheikh Mujib also warned Sheikh Mujib about these bureaucrats. Sheikh Mujib himself used to say,

90 percent of my administration are collaborators [war criminals].

Nationalization of industry failed to yield any tangible progress. Not only was the government weak and with no clear goals, but the country was also nearly bankrupt. In the Far Eastern Economic Review, journalist Lawrence Lifschultz wrote in 1974 that "the corruption and malpractices and plunder of national wealth" in Bangladesh were "unprecedented".

=== 2nd revolution and BAKSAL ===
Sheikh Mujib later made himself President of Bangladesh and established a national unity government, the Bangladesh Krishak Sramik Awami League (BAKSAL), on 7 June 1975 by banning all political parties and independent press. Mujib named the reform as Second Revolution. Although the BAKSAL was intended to bring stability to Bangladesh and uphold law and order, it engendered hostility among the bureaucracy, military, and civil society. Opposition groups, as well as some of Mujib's supporters, challenged Mujib's authoritarian, one-party state. The period of the BAKSAL's one-party rule was marked by widespread censorship and abuse of the judiciary, as well as opposition from the general populace, intellectuals, and all other political groups.

=== Party-partiality against rape-murder case ===
The army was already dissatisfied with Sheikh Mujib for sidelining them in favor of the JRB. However, in his book Bangladesh: A Legacy of Blood, Anthony Mascarenhas cited a specific factor behind the final outcry as influential: Mozammel, a contemporary Awami League youth leader from Tongi and the chairman of Tongi Awami League, seized a car of a newlywed housewife, killed her driver and husband, abducted her and gang-raped her and three days later, her dead body was found in the road near a bridge of Tongi. Mozammel was arrested by a leader of a squadron of the Bengal Lancer named Major Nasser and handed over to the police, but the police released him immediately. He was released from the punishment of that crime with the intervention of Sheikh Mujib. This incident increased the dissatisfaction against Sheikh Mujib in the army, specially in Major Faruque and acted as one of the prominently last-minute influences behind his assassination.

== Conspiracy ==
=== Conspirators ===
Major Sayed Farooq-ur-Rahman; Khandaker Abdur Rashid; Shariful Haque Dalim; Mohiuddin Ahmed; and Rashed Chowdhury, along with A. K. M. Mohiuddin Ahmed, Mohammad Bazlul Huda, and S. H. M. B. Noor Chowdhury (three majors in the Bangladesh Army), planned to topple the government and establish a military government of their own. They were previously part of the opposition to BAKSAL and viewed the government as too subservient to India and as a threat to Bangladesh's military. According to Anthony Mascarenhas, Faruque offered Major Ziaur Rahman indirectly to take part in the plan and tried to convince him, but Zia cleverly avoided the matter. According to Farooq, Zia's gesture meant: "I'm a senior officer. I cannot be involved in such things. If you junior officers want to do it, go ahead." However, the killer Lt. Col. Khandaker Abdur Rashid's wife and accused Jobaida Rashid said in his deposition, "Criticism was happened among Army officers for providing more facilities by forming Rakkhi Bahini besides the army. I hear these things from Farooq. Major Farooq has been in touch with General Zia since childhood. He was Zia's former acquaintance. Farooq used to roam alone around Sheikh Mujib's house in Dhanmondi area in the mid night wearing a khaki shirt and lungi and hatching the plan to assassinate Sheikh Mujib by observing everything. One night Major Farooq returned from Zia's house and told my husband that Zia wanted to be president if the government changed. Zia said, "It is a success to come to me. If it is a failure then do not involve me. It is not possible to change the government by keeping Sheikh Mujib alive". Major General (retd) M Khalilur Rahman (then director of BDR) testified, "Some army officers became divided as General Safiullah was not made the army chief despite being a senior on the basis of General Zia's number. I have heard that General Zia will retire from the army and be sent abroad as an ambassador." At one point after the swearing in of the cabinet, Major Rashid introduced me to his wife. I thought Major Rashid was a little proud and said, "She is my wife. My wife is the mastermind behind what we have done." The assassins considered the possible causes of the failure, and for the upcoming after-period after Mujib's assassination, they decided to use a well-wisher from Mujib's Awami League and a person who could be removed in time if desired, in order to curb the possible Indian intervention, the Awami League's vengeful armed opposition, the possible increasing arbitrariness of the anti-Awami League and to temporarily control the situation. After some time of searching, an Awami League cabinet minister under Mujib's government, Khondaker Mostaq Ahmad, agreed to take over the presidency. Mostaq also considered Mujib to be "illiterate" and was known to be jealous of Mujib's popularity. It is alleged that the Chief of Army Staff, Major General Kazi Mohammed Shafiullah, and the Directorate General of Forces Intelligence Air Vice Marshal, Aminul Islam Khan, were aware of the conspiracy. Major Faruque told Anthony Mascarenhas that he carried out the assassination following the direction of Andha Hafiz, a blind saint from Chittagong who was known having supernatural powers and his wife Farida helped him communicate with the saint. The saint entitled as a pir told him to carry out the killing in the interest of Islam, advised him to abandon personal interests and carry out the killing at the right time. However, Andha Hafiz later denied the claim in an interview with the weekly Bichinta.

=== International connections ===
Journalist Lawrence Lifschultz paints an alternate picture of the conspiracy, however, that implicates Mostaq and the US Central Intelligence Agency (CIA). He claimed that the "CIA station chief in Dhaka, Philip Cherry, was actively involved in the killing of the "Father of the Nation"—Bangabandhu Sheikh Mujibur Rahman." His claims largely relied on the testimony of a single anonymous businessman, however. Lifschultz characterized this incident as an outcome of the Cold War between the United States-influenced Pakistan and the Soviet Union-influenced India.

According to US documents, in 1972, Colonel Farooq secretly made an offer to purchase arms at the US embassy.

== Warnings by the intelligence ==
Mujib was warned by many including the Indian and as well as American intelligence about the possible coup.

=== Indian intelligence ===
In 1975, Rameshwar Nath Kao was in charge of the Research and Analysis Wing (R&AW) of the Indian Intelligence Service. In 1989, in the April 23–29 article of the English weekly Sunday of the ABP Group of India, while responding to an allegation he referred,

We had already received this information that a group of disgruntled members of the Bangladesh army were plotting to assassinate Sheikh Mujibur Rahman. I personally spoke to Prime Minister Indira Gandhi about the matter. I also told her that the news has been brought to us very cautiously. Whoever gave this news, his identity should be kept secret at any cost. I went to Dhaka in December 1974 with the permission of Indira Gandhi. At one point of my last meeting with Sheikh Mujibur Rahman, I requested him to give some time alone in the garden of Bangabhaban. There I told him about the information we knew about his death threat. He waved his hand and said, "They are like my own son, they will not harm me."

In March 1975, RN Kao again sent a senior officer of the 'RAW' to Bangabandhu. Kao wrote, "He met Sheikh Mujib. He was informed that the infantry and cavalry units of the Bangladesh Army were plotting to assassinate him. But unfortunately Sheikh Mujib ignored all warnings."

=== American intelligence ===
In 1975, Stephen Eisenbraun worked at the US State Department. He claimed that in late July or early August 1975, then US Ambassador Davis Eugene Boster was sent to Sheikh Mujib to warn him. He also claimed that, compared to a head of state, Bangabandhu Sheikh Mujibur Rahman's security system was very simple. His car used to stop at the traffic signal. He was sometimes seen reading a newspaper with the car window down.

=== Canada ===
The then deputy secretary and joint secretary of Ganabhaban Manowarul Islam went to Canada's capital Ottawa as the representative of Bangladesh in the Commonwealth meeting in early 1975. Then Canadian Prime Minister Pierre Trudeau also warned him about this. When Manowarul Islam informed Mujib about this, Mujib said, "Sheikh Mujib will stay away from the people under the guard of soldiers and police for fear of his life, where no one will dare to come, I don't want such life."

=== Others ===
The then Foreign Secretary Fakhruddin Ahmad wrote, "Two weeks before 15 August, I informed him (Mujib) about a special article published in Sweden. There was mention of discontent in the army and plans for a military coup. He didn't pay attention to my words. He said that he will call Army Chief Safiullah and ask him to look into the matter." Being President, he did not stay in Bangabhaban but stayed in his unguarded house at 32 Dhanmondi.

== Assassination attempt on 21 May 1975 ==
An unsuccessful attempt to assassinate Mujib occurred on 21 May 1975 during the evening hours. The attempt was made when Mujib was returning to his residence at Dhanmondi after visiting a new TV station in the outskirts of Dhaka in Rampura. According to journalists and police accounts, grenades were used. Although Mujib was unharmed, two unidentified persons were injured in the attack. The Deputy Superintendent of Police assigned to the security of President Mujib confirmed this to the Political Associate working at the US Embassy in Dhaka. Some journalists also reported this to the embassy's information officer. However, the state decided to not publicise the incident. The Information Directorate sent strict instructions to the newspapers not to publish the news.

Prior to this, on March 16, the day before Mujib's birthday, there were bomb attacks in three places in Dhaka. One person was killed and four others injured in an attack at the bar of Hotel Intercontinental. Three people were injured in the attack in Dhaka Newmarket. A total of 12 people were injured in the three incidents. All were discharged from the hospital after initial treatment. Although the attacks were isolated, the US Embassy in Dhaka considered them to be a rehearsal for the attack on Mujib.

== 15 August 1975 ==
On 15 August 1975, President Sheikh Mujibur Rahman was scheduled to attend the convocation ceremony of Dhaka University in the morning. In the early hours of Friday, 15 August, the conspirators divided into four groups. Creating roadblocks around the target areas using unarmored T-54 tanks, one group, consisting of members of the Bengal Lancers of the First Armoured Division and 535th Infantry Division under Major Huda, attacked Mujib's residence. The army chief K. M. Shafiullah was caught unaware and failed to stop the coup.

K.M. Shafiullah told the court about his last telephone conversation with Sheikh Mujibur Rahman,

When I spoke to Bangabandhu, upon hearing me he said, "Safiullah your force has attacked my house. Kamal seems to have been killed. You send the force (army) immediately." To every reply I said, "I am doing something. Can you get out of the house?" When I called Zia and Khaled Musharraf, I asked them to come to my house as soon as possible. They came to my house within 15 to 20 minutes. Zia was uniformed and shaved. Khaled Musharraf arrived in his car in night dress.

=== Account of Abdur Rahman Sheikh Roma ===
Abdur Rahman Sheikh Roma joined as Sheikh Mujibur Rahman's domestic worker in 1969. On 15 August 1975 he was present at the house of Sheikh Mujib. He testified in court in Sheikh Mujibur Rahman's assassination case. According to his statement,

On the night of the incident, Bangabandhu (Sheikh Mujibur Rahman), his wife Begum Mujib (Sheikh Fazilatunnesa Mujib) and their youngest son Sheikh Russel (aged 10 years) were asleep in the same room on the second floor. Sheikh Kamal and his wife Sultana Kamal were asleep on the third floor. Sheikh Jamal and his wife Rozi and Mujib's younger brother Sheikh Naser were asleep on the second floor in their rooms. Domestic workers Roma and Selim both were asleep on the balcony in front of Bangabandhu's bedroom on the second floor. PA Mohitul Islam and other employees were on the ground floor.

Around five o'clock in the morning, Begum Mujib suddenly opened the door of her room and came out and said that miscreants had attacked Abdur Rab Serniabat's house. Upon hearing of Begum Mujib, Roma quickly went to the lake shore and saw some soldiers coming toward Mujib's residence by firing. Bangabandhu went down and was talking to his Mohitul Islam in the reception room of the house then. At that time, Begum Mujib was in the second floor. Roma went to the third floor and informed Sheikh Kamal about the attack. Kamal then went down. Roma and Sultana Kamal came to the second floor. Roma then informed Sheikh Jamal about the attack. Jamal quickly went to Begum Mujib's room. His wife also went with him. There was a lot of firing heard at this time. At one point, Roma heard gunshots with the screams of Sheikh Kamal.

At the same time, Bangabandhu came to the second floor, entered his room and closed the door. Firing stopped. Bangabandhu opened the door and came out again as the assailants surrounded him. He asked, "What do you want? Where will you take me?"...

According to Roma,

They were taking Bangabandhu towards the stairs. After descending two-thirds of the stairs, some assailants present at the bottom of the stairs fired at Bangabandhu, who immediately fell down.

Roma was behind the assailants. They asked Roma, "What do you do?" He replied, "Work." Then they asked him to go in. Roma went to the washroom of Begum Mujib's room (Bangabandhu's room) and took shelter. There he informed Begum Mujib that Bangabandhu has been shot. Sheikh Kamal's wife Sultana, Sheikh Jamal and his wife Rosi, Sheikh Russel and Bangabandhu's brother Naser also took shelter in the washroom. Sheikh Naser was shot in the hand before entering the washroom, it was bleeding from his hand. Begum Mujib tore a hem of her sari and wiped his blood.

Meanwhile, the assailants came again to the second floor and they were banging on the door. Begum Mujib went to open the door and said, "If we die, we will all die together." After opening the door, the assailants entered the room and took Sheikh Naser, Sheikh Russel, Begum Mujib and Roma downstairs. While going downstairs, Begum Mujib saw Bangabandhu's body on the stairs and said, "I will not go further, kill me here." After these words, the assailants took her to the second floor again. Screams and sound of gunshots were then heard.

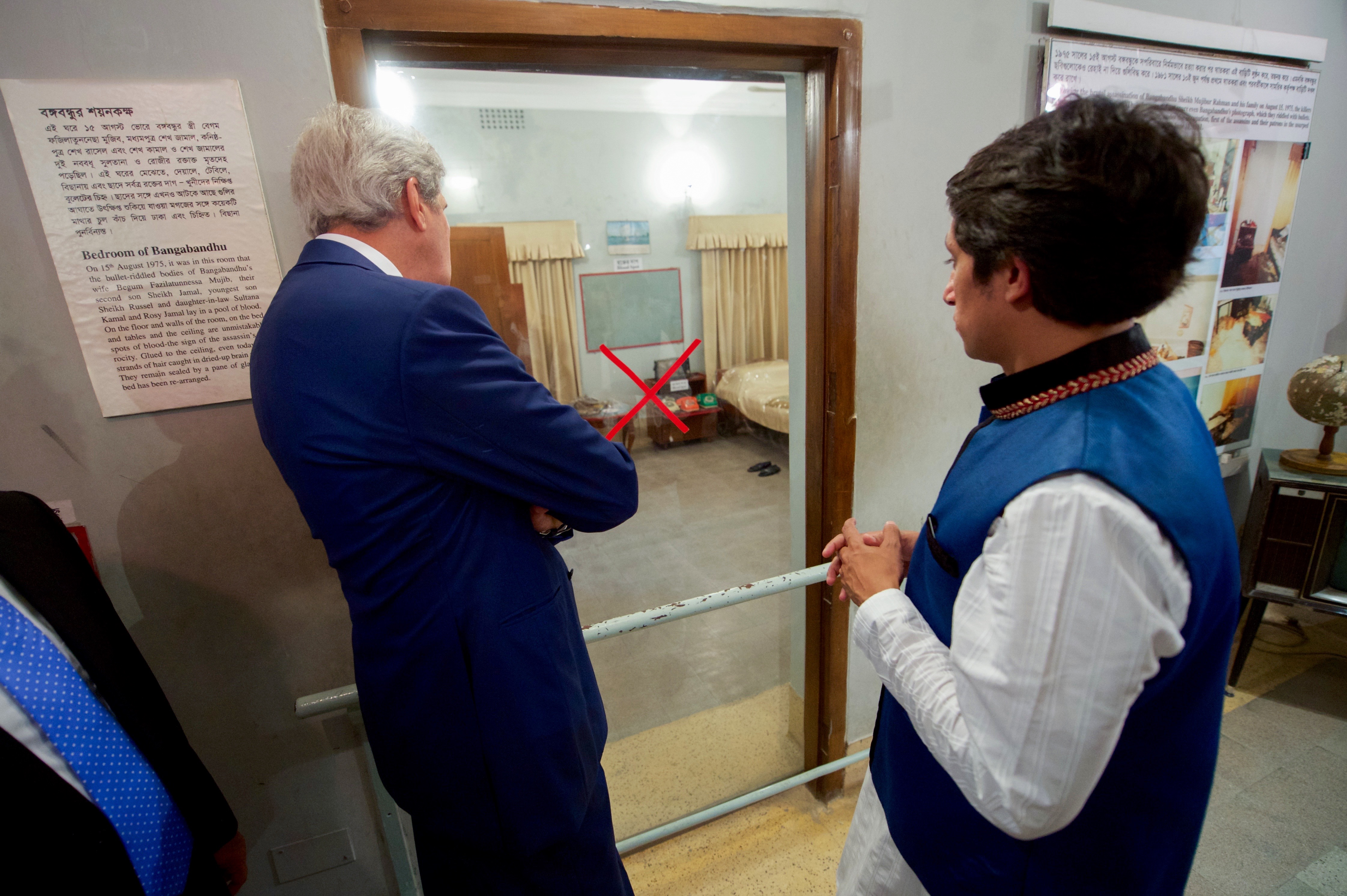
The bedroom where Begum Mujib and most of the members of Mujib family were assassinated

The assailants brought Naser, Russel and Roma to the residential ground and made them stand in line. There Roma saw the dead body of a plainclothes policeman. An assailant noticed Naser and asked, "Who are you?" When he introduced himself as Sheikh Naser, he was taken to the washroom on the ground floor and shot. Kid Sheikh Russel cried, "I want to go to my mother." Holding PA Mohitul Islam in the line, Russel asked him, "Brother, will they kill me?", Then an assailant arrived and said, "Let's take you to your mother" and took him to the second floor. After a while gunshots and screams were heard.

Roma found Selim, DSP Nurul Islam and PA/receptionist Mohitul Islam injured while standing in line. During this time, the assailants, dressed in black, looted the house. Then a tank came in front of Mujib's residence. Some soldiers from the tank descended in and asked the inner soldiers, "Who is inside?", the inner soldiers in answer said, "All are finished". After being released at 12pm, Roma moved to his village home in Tungipara.

=== Other statements ===
==== Sheikh Mujib family ====
A correspondent for Anandabazar Patrika, Sukharanjan Dasgupta, who described the Bangladesh Liberation War in Dhaka until 1974, writes in his book Midnight Massacre in Dacca that "the exact details of the massacre will always remain shrouded in mystery". He went on to say that the army platoon protecting the president's house offered no resistance. Sheikh Kamal, son of Mujib, was shot at the reception area on the ground floor.

Meanwhile, Mujib was asked to surrender. He telephoned Colonel Jamil Uddin Ahmad, the new Chief of Military Intelligence. When Jamil arrived and ordered the troops back to the barracks, he was gunned down at the gate of the residence. Mujib was shot and killed, after he refused to surrender. According to some accounts,

Sheikh Mujib was shot at point-blank range from a distance of 7 feet in the chest. A total of 18 bullets hit his body. 9 bullets hit the lower right side of the chest in a circular pattern. 1 bullet hit the lower abdomen and exited through the other side. 1 bullet hit the index finger of his right hand and the finger was almost severed. 2 bullets hit the upper part of both hands and 1 bullet hit the palm of the left hand. A total of 4 bullets hit in both legs above and below the knees. His face was unharmed.

Although S. H. M. B. Noor Chowdhury was marked to be the person who fired the fatal shots, Noor Chowdhury denied the accusation in an interview given to the CPB Radio. Other people killed in the attack were Sheikh Fazilatunnesa Mujib, wife of Mujib, who was killed upstairs; Sheikh Nasser, younger brother of Mujib, who was killed in a lavatory; several servants of Mujib, who were also killed in lavatories; Sheikh Jamal, the second son of Mujib and an army officer; ten-year-old Sheikh Russel, the youngest son of Mujib; and two daughters-in-law of Mujib.

==== Moni and Serniabat family ====
In Dhanmondi, two other groups of soldiers killed Sheikh Fazlul Haque Mani, Mujib's nephew and a leader of the Awami League, along with his pregnant wife, Arzu Moni. Mujib's brother-in-law, Abdur Rab Serniabat was killed with thirteen of his family members on Mintu Road. He was a minister of the government.

==== Mohammadpur ====
At Dhanmondi, an artillery group under Colonel Mohiuddin Ahmed took up a position with a M101 howitzer on the lake shore south of Mujib's residence. The mortar shells fired from there towards the residence, missed its target and hit Mohammadpur (to the north of Dhanmondi). At this, house number 8 and 9 of Shershah Suri Road and house number 196 and 197 of Shahjahan Road (tinshed slum) caught fire instantly killing 14 and leaving 40 people injured.

==== Savar ====
The fourth and most powerful group was sent towards Savar to repel the expected counter-attack by the security forces stationed there. After a brief fight and the loss of eleven men, the security forces surrendered.

== Casualties ==
The total number of casualties in the coup is still unknown. However, most of the identities have been reported.

=== Deaths ===
- Shot dead in Sheikh Mujib's house: Sheikh Mujibur Rahman, Sheikh Abu Naser, Sheikh Fazilatunnesa Mujib, Sheikh Kamal, Sultana Kamal Khuki, Sheikh Jamal, Parveen Jamal Rosy, Sheikh Russel
- Others: Siddiqur Rahman (police officer), Mahbubul Haque (police officer), Col. Jamil Uddin Ahmed (newly appointed D.G.F.I. chief)
- Sheikh Moni's house (severely injured in firing and declared dead in hospital): Sheikh Fazlul Haque Moni, Begum Arju Moni (Begum Samsunnesa)
- House of Serniabat (shot dead): Abdur Rab Serniabat, Arif Serniabat, Baby Serniabat, Shaheed Serniabat, Sukanto Abdullah Babu, Naeem Khan Rintu, Potka (domestic worker), Lakshmi's mother (domestic worker)
- House No. 8 and 9 of Sher Shah Suri Road and House No. 196 and 197 of Shahjahan Road in Mohammadpur (died by fire caused by the misfired mortar shells): Rezia Begum, Nasima, Habibur Rahman, Anwara Begum, Anwara Begum (2), Moyful Bibi, Sabera Begum, Abdullah, Rafiqul, Safia Khatun, Shahabuddin, Kasheda, Aminuddin, Hanufa Bibi
- Savar security force station: 11 people

=== Injuries ===
- Sheikh Mujib's house (injured in firing): AFM Mohitul Islam (P.A./receptionist), Nurul Islam (D.S.P), Md. Salim (domestic worker)
- House of Serniabat (injured in firing): Sheikh Amena Begum, Sahan Ara Abdullah, Beauty Serniabat, Abul Khair Abdullah, Hena Serniabat
- Sher Shah Suri Road and Shahjahan Road in Mohammadpur (injured by fire caused by the misfired mortar shells): 40 people

== Reactions ==
=== Mushtaq Ahmed's reaction ===
After Sheikh Mujib was killed, Khandaker Mushtaq Ahmed declared himself President, a position he held for only 83 days. In his address to the nation shortly after assuming power, he called Sheikh Mujibur Rahman's killers the sun-born children of the nation. After assuming office as president, he passed the Indemnity Bill. On 25 August of that year, he appointed Ziaur Rahman as Chief of Army Staff. Mushtaq Ahmed was removed from power by a mutiny on 5 November 1975.

=== Ziaur Rahman's reaction ===
On the morning of the assassination, the then Lieutenant Colonel Amin Ahmed Chowdhury entered General Ziaur Rahman's house and learned through the radio that President Sheikh Mujibur Rahman had been assassinated. He described the incident, "General Zia was shaving on one side and not shaving on the other. He came running in a sleeping suit. He asked Shafayat Jamil, 'Shafayat what happened?' Shafayat said, 'Apparently two battalions staged a cue. (Most likely two army groups have staged a coup.) We still don't know what happened outside. I am hearing the announcement on the radio that the President is dead.' Then General Zia said, So what? Let the Vice President take over. We have nothing to do with politics. Get your troops ready. Uphold the Constitution. (So what? Let the Vice President take over. We have nothing to do with politics. Get your troops ready. Uphold the Constitution.)"

Major Rafiqul Islam, Professor Abu Sayyid and an eyewitness military officer claim that Ziaur Rahman, jubilant after Mujib's assassination, told Major Dalim,

You have done a great and extraordinary job. Kiss me. Kiss me.

Then Zia hugged Dalim with deep emotion.

Ziaur Rahman, after assuming the office of President, appointed many military officers who had murdered Mujib to the rank of Secretary in foreign embassies. They were:

- K.M. Mohiuddin Ahmed, Second Secretary, Algeria
- Lt. Col. Shariful Haque Dalim, First Secretary, China
- Aziz Pasha, First Secretary, Argentina
- Major Bazlul Huda, Second Secretary, Pakistan
- Major Shahriar Rashid, Second Secretary, Indonesia
- Major Rashed Chowdhury, Second Secretary, Saudi Arabia
- Major Noor Chowdhury, Second Secretary, Iran
- Major Shariful Hossain, Second Secretary, Kuwait
- Kismat Hashem, Third Secretary, Abu Dhabi
- Lt. Khairuzzaman, Third Secretary, Egypt
- Lt. Nazmul Hossain, Third Secretary, Canada
- Lt. Abdul Majed, Third Secretary, Senegal

Ziaur Rahman's actions in the aftermath of the assassination of Sheikh Mujibur Rahman are claimed by many analysts as indirect evidence of his involvement in the assassination of Mujib.

=== Indemnity order ===
Indemnity Ordinance was enacted in Bangladesh to provide immunity or punishment from legal proceedings to those involved in the assassination of Sheikh Mujibur Rahman and his family. On 26 September 1975, the then President Khandaker Mushtaq Ahmed issued the Indemnity Ordinance. This law was incorporated into the Bangladesh Constitution in the amended law after the 5th Amendment to the Constitution of Bangladesh on 9 July 1979.

Ziaur Rahman is also criticized for obstructing the trial of Sheikh Mujibur Rahman's assassination. Ziaur Rahman reinstated the controversial Indemnity Ordinance, which was enacted to obstruct the trial of Mujibur Rahman's assassination. He incorporated it into the Constitution through the 5th Amendment, which was declared illegal.

In February 2010, the Bangladesh High Court declared the 5th Amendment to the Constitution illegal.

=== Khaled Musharraf's response ===
Against the government formed by the coup of Major Farooq, Major Rashid and Khandaker Mushtaq Ahmed, another counter-coup was led by General Khaled Musharraf, with the support of the Dhaka 46 Infantry Brigade led by Colonel Shafayat Jamil, who directed this coup out of his strong affection for Sheikh Mujibur Rahman. This coup led to the overthrow of the Mushtaq government on 3 November 1975. But before that, Sheikh Mujibur Rahman's assassins, upon receiving news of the coup, decided to kill four Awami League leaders (Syed Nazrul Islam, Tajuddin Ahmed, Abul Hasnat Mohammad Kamaruzzaman, Muhammad Mansur Ali) who were previously imprisoned in Dhaka Central Jail, because at that time there was a possibility of the Awami League regaining power through the coup through the four leaders, and therefore on the morning of November 3, these four Awami League leaders were killed before the coup. Immediately after this, on the same day, i.e. on November 3, Khaled Musharraf's coup took place, as a result of which Khandaker Mushtaq Ahmed was forced to resign on November 6 and Abu Sadat Mohammad Sayem became the new President of Bangladesh. After this, Ziaur Rahman was forced to resign from the post of Chief-of-Army Staff. In the coup of 3 November, Khaled Musharraf wanted to carry out a bloodless coup. Therefore, he kept Ziaur Rahman under house arrest in his own residence, which caused adverse reactions due to his popularity among the army. Colonel (retd) Abu Taher was stationed in Chittagong at that time. Colonel Taher was a special well-wisher of Ziaur Rahman and he believed in socialism, he did not like the discrimination between soldiers and officers. Because of this policy, Taher was very popular among the ordinary soldiers of the army and he believed that Zia was also a man of his ideals. After the coup of 3 November, Taher learned that Ziaur Rahman had been captured. He immediately left Chittagong for Dhaka, ordering the mutiny of the sepoys of his loyal East Bengal Regiment. At that time, several hundred JSD workers were with him. Colonel Taher's counter-coup was successful on 7 November, according to Sukhranjan Dasgupta, Ataul Ghani Osmani also assisted in the coup. He freed Ziaur Rahman from Dhaka Cantonment and brought him to the headquarters of the 2nd Field Artillery. In this counter-coup, General Khaled Musharraf was killed by disgruntled soldiers at the headquarters of the 10th East Bengal Regiment he had established. However, when Ziaur Rahman broke his promise, the sepoys continued the rebellion. In the end, Ziaur Rahman suppressed the rebellion. Later, Taher was charged with taking a pro-Russian Marxist–Leninist socialist stance against Zia's pro-American capitalist democratic stance, and was sentenced to death by a military court. He was hanged on 21 July 1976.

== Aftermath ==
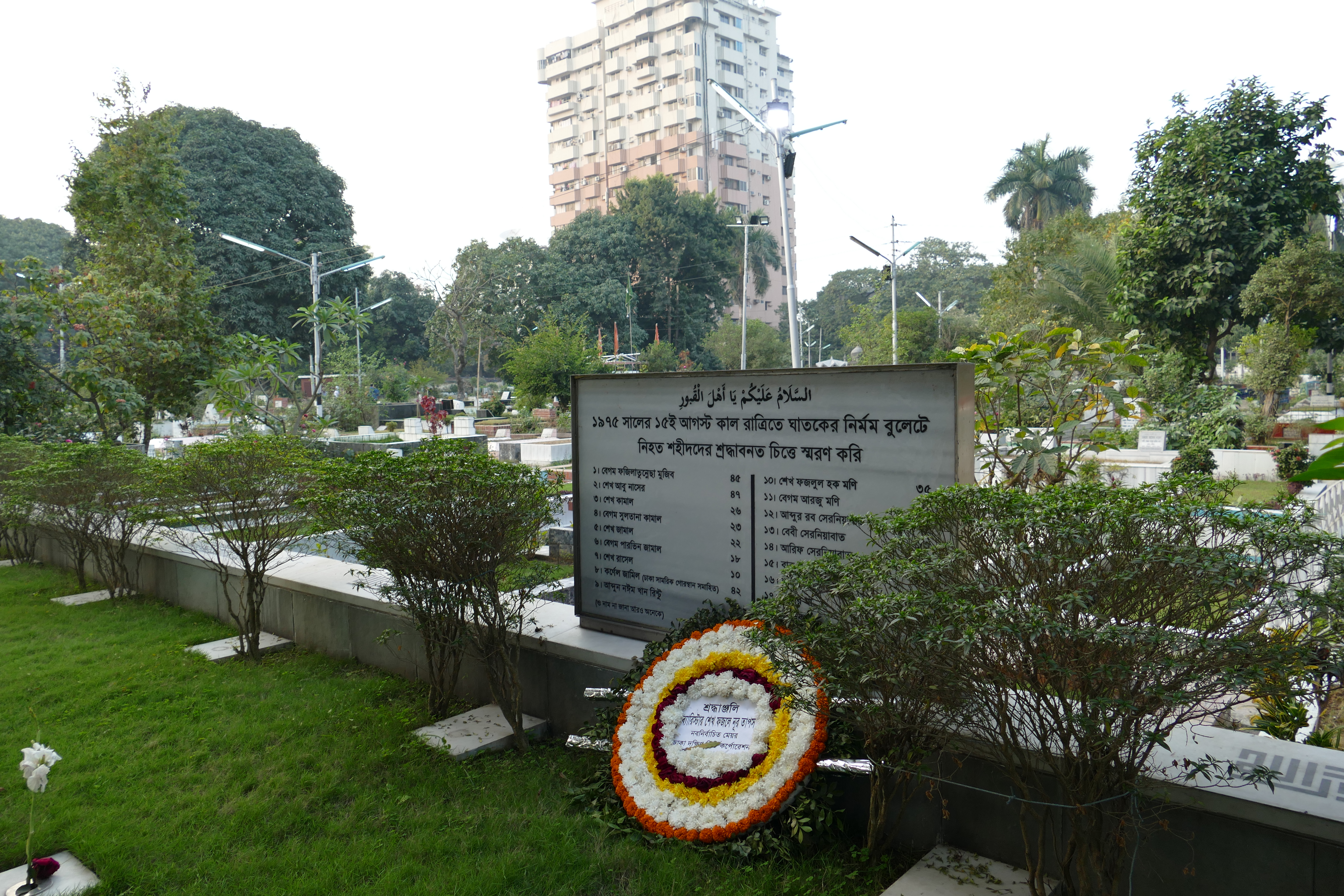
Grave of the victims at Banani Graveyard

Curfew was imposed after Mujib's death was announced on Bangladesh Radio nationwide. A 24-hour curfew was imposed on the day of the assassination. However, for Friday prayers at 12:30 p.m. an adjournment was given till 2 o'clock. The next day there was a break in the 24-hour curfew from 9:30 to 12:00. On 17 August there was an adjourned from 6 am to evening. A break was given on 18 August from morning to 10 in the night. Schools, colleges, offices, courts and factories were fully opened from that day.

On the morning of the assassination, the then Lieutenant Colonel Amin Ahmed Chowdhury entered the house of General Ziaur Rahman and found out on the radio that President Sheikh Mujibur Rahman had been assassinated. He described the incident: "General Zia is shaving on one side but not on the other. Came running in the sleeping suit, he asked Shafaat Jamil, "What happened, Shafaat?" Shafaat replied, "Apparently two battalions staged a coup. We don't know yet what happened outside. We hear the announcement on the radio that the president is dead." Then General Zia said, "So what? Let vice-president take over. We have nothing to do with politics. Get your troops ready. Uphold the constitution."

Khondaker Mostaq Ahmad assumed the presidency, and Major General Ziaur Rahman became the new Chief of Army Staff. The leading conspirators were all given high government ranks. They were all later toppled by yet another coup led by Brigadier General Khaled Mosharraf on 3 November 1975. Mosharraf himself was killed during a counter-revolt four days later on 7 November, which freed Major General Ziaur Rahman in power and was brought in to bring law and order.

Four of the founding leaders of the Awami League, first Prime Minister of Bangladesh Tajuddin Ahmed, former Prime Minister Mansur Ali, former Vice President Syed Nazrul Islam, and former Home Minister A. H. M. Qamaruzzaman, were arrested. Three months later, on 3 November 1975, they were murdered in Dhaka Central Jail.

Major Sayed Farooq-ur-Rahman, Rashid, and the other army officers were promoted to the rank of lieutenant colonel. Nevertheless, they were exiled to Libya, China, Rhodesia, Canada, and other countries, although they were given several diplomatic posts in Bangladeshi missions abroad. Lieutenant Colonel (Rtd.) Sayed Farooq-ur-Rahman later returned and founded the Bangladesh Freedom Party in 1985 and took part in the presidential election in 1987 against the military ruler Lieutenant General Hussain Mohammad Ershad but lost that election in a landslide.

Mujib's two daughters, Sheikh Hasina and Sheikh Rehana, were in West Germany at the time of his assassination. After the coup, they were barred from returning to Bangladesh and were granted asylum by India. Sheikh Hasina lived in New Delhi in exile before returning to Bangladesh on 17 May 1981.

== Protests, revolt and counter coup ==
=== Students and public protests ===
The assassination of Sheikh Mujibur Rahman, culminated in protests that took place beginning in Barguna. Freedom fighter Motaleb Mridha Barguna SDO Siraj Uddin Ahmed led BLA president Jahangir Kabir Nanak with 10-15 BLA workers in a procession. Later, leaders and workers of the Awami League, Jubo League and Chhatra League of Barguna joined in the protest. On the morning of 15 August, protests were held in several places including Kishoreganj, Bhairab, Khulna, Jessore, Faridganj in Chandpur, Mohanganj in Netrakona, and Gafargaon in Mymensingh. The military patrol was strengthened when the students tried to held a protest rally in the Dhaka University area. Meanwhile, news of arrests began to arrive from different parts of the country. Poet Nirmalendu Goon was arrested and imprisoned for writing a poem. The military administration also placed around 50 Awami League activists, including the four national leaders, in Dhaka Central Jail.

On the day of the assassination, Mufti Nurullah protested it in the Friday prayer sermon at Brahmanbaria Jameh Mosque.

In August, Chittagong City College students held a protest march, which was dispersed by the police. Freedom fighter commander Maulvi Syed, student leader ABM Mohiuddin Chowdhury and later Awami League leader S.M. Yusuf began to resist. A case was filled by the military junta against the protestors and resisters termed 'Chittagong Conspiracy'. Maulvi Syed was arrested and later died while imprisoned. It is claimed that he died due to torture by the army.

On 16 October, a meeting called by Khandaker Mushtaq was boycotted by 10 ministers. When some of the convicts attended the meeting held at the Tejgaon MP Hostel, they were forced to leave the meeting in the face of protests from some of the present ministers. The ministers condemned the killing of Mujib and his family members in their speeches. Advocate Serajul Huq reportedly protested, calling Mushtaq's seizure of power illegal. On 18 October, the Student League and Student Union protested by writing posters and writing on the walls of Dhaka University. A protest rally was held on 20 October. Meanwhile, some students who distributed protest leaflets in Dhaka were arrested. The protest rally on 21 October was stopped by the police.

On November Dhaka University students led a protest march from the historic Battala, ignoring the obstacles of the armed forces, to the residence of Sheikh Mujibur Rahman at 32, Dhanmondi, where the student-public held a protest meeting and a special prayer. In the afternoon, at the Dhaka University Senate meeting, the university's Vice-Chancellor Professor Dr. Muhammad Shamsul Huq delivered a speech condemning Mujib's assassination. The student leaders formally raised a condolence motion which was unanimously approved and a minute of silence was observed.

On 5 November, a half-day strike was called from 6 am to 12 pm in Dhaka to protest the killing of the four national leaders and Mujib. After the funeral prayer, a student rally was held at the south gate of Baitul Mukarram, where several demands were raised, including the trial of the assassins. The 'National Mourning Day' was declared in memory of Sheikh Mujib. There was another protest the next day.

On 15 January 1976, Dhaka University and various educational institutions in the vicinity were surrounded, hundreds of students were arrested and left hungry in the open field of Suhrawardy Udyan for the whole day. On 15 August 1976, the first death anniversary of Sheikh Mujibur Rahman was observed as a 'National Mourning Day' in various parts of the country, including Dhaka University, despite military restrictions. 22 people were arrested in Kishoreganj for defying the restrictions. They were released in stages over a period of 1 year.

=== Revolt ===
Abdul Kader Siddique later divided 17,000 soldiers into 7 fronts and waged a revolt against the military junta for 22 months. In this, between 104 and over 400 were killed according to varying opinions, and hundreds were injured. Among them, the rebellion and struggle of 500 protesters including veterans of the Bangladesh Liberation War of Sherpur Sadar, Sreebardi, Jhenaigati and Nakla upazilas was most discussed. Kamrul Alam Khan Khasru, film actor and the guerrilla commander of Dhaka region during the Bangladesh Liberation War, was shot and hospitalized while protesting the assassination. After being recovered, he left the country and later returned.

On 18 August 1976, 5 freedom fighters Javed Ali, Nikhil Dutt, Subodh Dhar, Dipal Das, Mofiz Uddin were killed in an army operation for protesting. The surviving youth fighter, Biswajit Nandi, was arrested and sentenced to be executed by hanging after being found guilty by a military court on 18 May 1977. Influenced by influential world leaders including Indira Gandhi, Biswajit received a commutation of his death sentence to life imprisonment. He was released in 1989.

=== Counter coup ===
On 19 August 1975, the army chief KM Safiullah organized a meeting at the army headquarters to seek clarification on the situation that arose after the assassination. In the meeting Colonel Shafayat Jamil, the brigade commander of 46th Independent Infantry Brigade based in Dhaka addressed the assassin majors,

You all are liars, mutineers and deserters. You are all murderers. Tell your Mustaque that he is an usurper and conspirator. He is not my President. In my first opportunity I shall dislodge him and you all will be tried for your crimes.

On 3 November 1975, Brigadier General Khaled Mosharraf launched a successful coup with the support of Colonel Shafayat Jamil to remove the assassins from power and Khondaker Mostaq Ahmad from the Presidency.

Mushtaq Ahmad was ousted from power and jailed on 6 November following the coup led by Brigadier Khaled Mosharraf and Colonel Shafat Jamil among others. However, prior to this, on 4 November the junior officers involved in the assassination were provided safe passage to Bangkok, after they killed the imprisoned 4 national leaders also at Dhaka Central Jail on 3 November.

Remarking the assassination on 15 August, KM Safiullah said,

I do not want to call the events of 15 August 1975 a military coup. Although later it was established as a military coup. In fact, a small group of the military, personal who were inside and outside the military, did it.... It was not even a military coup but a terrorist act.

== Trial and judgments ==
The military decided not to court-martial the military officers who masterminded and participated in the coup. AFM Mohitul Islam, personal assistant to Sheikh Mujib and a survivor of the attack on his house, attempted to file a case against the military officers, but the police slapped him in the face and refused to file the report. On 18 September 1980, a commission of inquiry was formed by four British jurists in the United Kingdom on the assassination of Sheikh Mujibur Rahman, his family and four national leaders. It was led by Sir Thomas Williams titled "Sheikh Mujib Murder Inquiry". However, they were not allowed to investigate in Bangladesh by the then Bangladesh government. The assassination conspirators could not be tried in a court of law because of the Indemnity Act passed by the government under President Khondaker Mostaq Ahmad. When the Awami League, led by Mujib's daughter, Sheikh Hasina, won elections in 1996, the act was repealed. The Bangabandhu murder trial began with the case filing by Mohitul Islam.

=== Investigation and arrests ===
Colonel (Rtd.) Sayed Farooq-ur-Rahman was arrested from his Dhaka home, and Colonel (Rtd.) Mohammad Bazlul Huda was brought back from Bangkok, where he was serving a prison sentence for shoplifting as part of a criminal exchange program between Thailand and Bangladesh. Lieutenant Colonel Mohiuddin Ahmed was in active military service when he was arrested. Colonel (Rtd.) Sultan Shahriar Rashid Khan had been appointed to active diplomatic service by previous Prime Minister of Bangladesh Begum Khaleda Zia, but he returned to Bangladesh and was arrested when he was recalled by the foreign ministry. Colonel (Rtd.) Abdur Rashid and other accused individuals had already left Bangladesh, however. They believed that the upcoming 1996 general election would be an Awami League victory, which would result in the repealing of the Indemnity Act and their subsequent arrest. Colonel (Rtd.) Rashid now reportedly shuttles between Pakistan and Libya. All these men were also involved in Jail Killing on 3 November 1975, when four Awami League officials were assassinated.

=== Trial and sentencing: lower court ===
The first trial ended on 8 November 1998. The District and Session Judge of Dhaka, Mohammad Golam Rasul, ordered the death sentence by firing squad to fifteen out of the twenty accused of conspiring in the assassination. The sentences were not carried out immediately, because five of the convicts sought to file appeals in the high court division of the Supreme Court of Bangladesh. The Supreme Court, consisting of Justice Mohammad Ruhul Amin and Justice A. B. M. Khairul Haque, who was the former Chief Justice of Bangladesh, gave a divisive verdict. Senior Justice Amin acquitted five out of the original fifteen accused, whereas Junior Justice Haque upheld the lower court's verdict. A verdict from a third judge became necessary. Later, Justice Mohammad Fazlul Karim condemned twelve out of original fifteen, including two acquitted in Justice Amin's verdict. One of the convicts, Major (Rtd.) Aziz Pasha died in Zimbabwe on 2 June 2001.

=== Appeal: high court ===
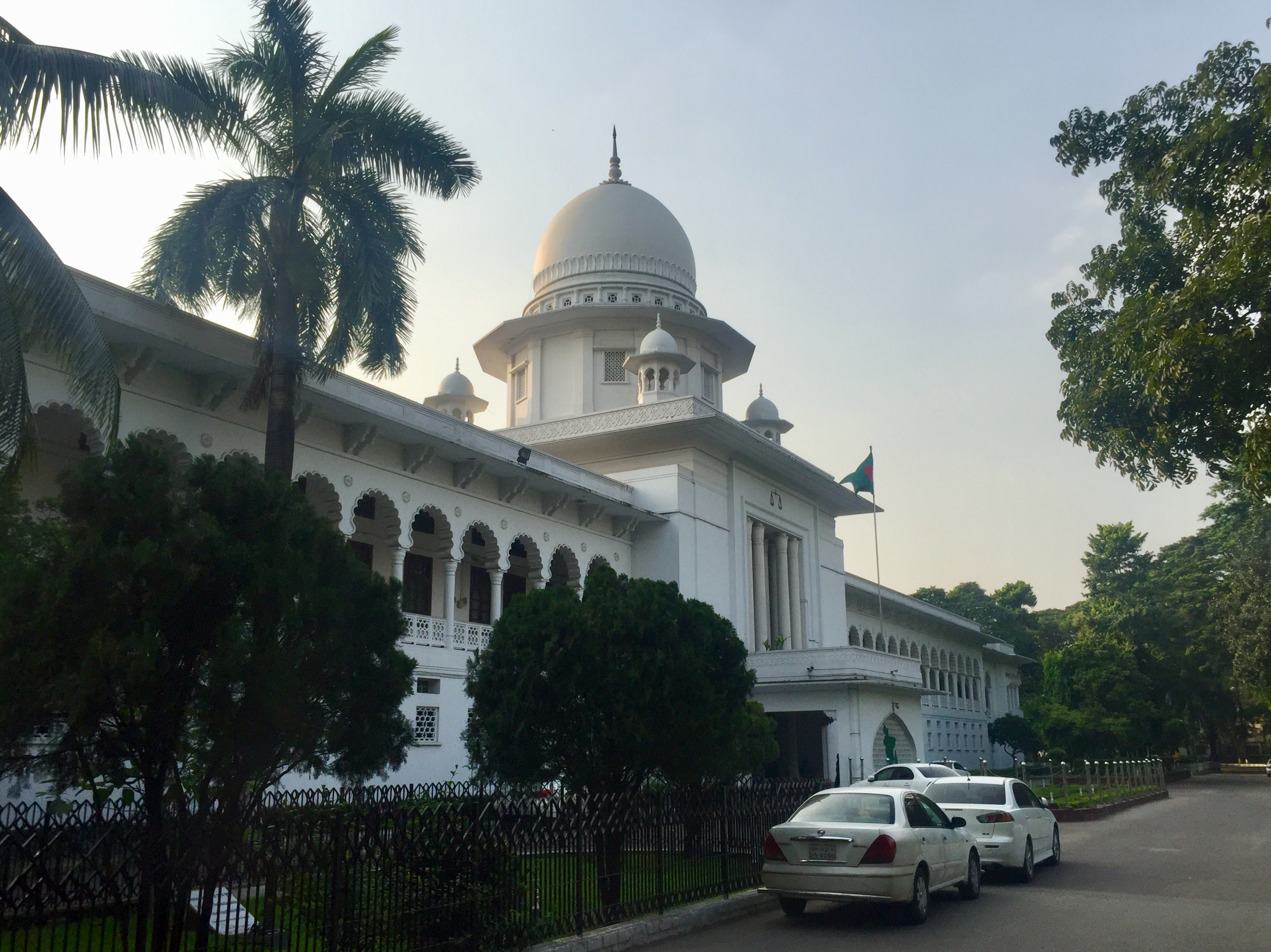
Supreme Court of Bangladesh, Dhaka

The five accused appealed to the appellate division of the Supreme Court, their decision remained pending from August 2001. Several judges refused to hear the case, which meant the government lacked the three judges required to hold a hearing session. On 18 June 2007, one of the conspirators who had been sentenced to death, Major (Rtd.) A. K. M. Mohiuddin Ahmed was extradited to Bangladesh from the United States following a series of failed attempts to gain asylum or permanent residency in the United States. On 7 August 2007, the murder case hearings resumed after a six-year delay. The appellate division of the Supreme Court of Bangladesh gave its verdict on 19 November 2009, after a five-member special bench, headed by Justice Mahammad Tafazzal Islam, spent 29 days hearing the petition filed by the convicted.

The appeal of the convicts was rejected, and the death sentence was upheld. Before the verdict, approximately 12,000 extra policemen were deployed to guard strategic buildings, including the Supreme Court building, to prevent disruption of the proceedings by the convicted men's supporters. Nevertheless, they were blamed by the government for a grenade attack on one of the prosecution lawyers in October 2009, although no one has been charged yet.

Captain (Rtd.) Qismet Hashem, Captain (Rtd.) Nazmul Hossain Ansar, and Major (Rtd.) Sharful Hossain were acquitted through the high court division and appellate division verdicts and now lives in Canada. Taheruddin Thakur, former Information Minister and one of the suspects, was cleared during the Hasina Government, acquitted in trial, and released. He died of natural causes in 2009.

=== Executions ===
The hanged were Sultan Shahriar Rashid Khan, Mohiuddin Ahmed, Mohiuddin Ahmed, Sayed Farooq-ur-Rahman, and Mohammad Bazlul Huda.

On 7 April 2020, Captain Abdul Majed who was hiding in Kolkata, was arrested at Mirpur by the Counter Terrorism and Transnational Crime unit of the Dhaka Metropolitan Police. He was sent to Dhaka Central Jail, Keraniganj, and was executed by hanging a few days later on the 12 April 2020.

=== Fugitives ===
Six individuals: Noor Chowdhury, Rashed Chowdhury, Abdul Aziz Pasha, Khandaker Abdur Rashid, Shariful Haque Dalim, and Moslemuddin, were tried in absentia for the assassination, and currently remain fugitives in Bangladesh, despite extensive efforts to have them extradited.

Abdul Aziz Pasha died in Harare, Zimbabwe, on 2 June 2001.

Khandaker Abdur Rashid and Rashed Chowdhury currently live in the United States, after applying for asylum.

S. H. M. B. Noor Chowdhury, applied for asylum in Canada, and currently lives in the Etobicoke neighborhood of Toronto. He was the subject on the CBC television series The Fifth Estate, on an episode titled "The Assassin Next Door", detailing his role as the assassin, and his life in Toronto.

The whereabouts of Shariful Haque Dalim and Moslemuddin are unknown. It is claimed that Dalim has a Kenyan passport, and currently lives in Pakistan.

== Tributes ==
The assassination changed the course of politics in Bangladesh, and the ramifications of which are still being felt across South Asia. Many world leaders, eminent personalities, at that time, expressed their shock and condemned the heinous act of killing.

Fidel Castro, leader and the prime minister of Cuba, said,

The oppressed people of the world have lost a great leader of theirs in the death of Sheikh Mujib. And I have lost a truly large-hearted friend.

Henry Kissinger, American diplomat and politician, said,

A dynamic leader like Sheikh Mujibur Rahman will not be found in the Asian continent in the next twenty years

Willy Brandt, politician and chancellor of Germany, said,

Bengalis can no longer be trusted after the killing of Sheikh Mujib. Those who killed Mujib can do any heinous thing.

Yasser Arafat, the president of Palestine, said

Uncompromising combative leadership and tender heart were the hallmarks of Mujib's character.

Indira Gandhi, the prime minister of India, said,

I am shocked by the news of Sheikh Mujib's death. He was a great leader. His unique general courage was an inspiration to the people of Asia and Africa.

Saddam Hussein, the president of Iraq, said,

Bangabandhu Sheikh Mujibur Rahman is the first martyr of the struggle to establish socialism. Thus, he is immortal.

Mark Tully, the bureau chief of BBC, said,

The life of the man who was indeed the Father of the nation because he was the sole leader of the movement which led to the birth of Bangladesh ended in tragedy.

Fenner Brockway, member of the UK House of Lords, said,

Bangabandhu Sheikh Mujibur Rahman is enshrined in the freedom which he won for all the people of Bangladesh, every man, woman and child. He was a great leader as George Washington, Gandhi and The Valera. He strove to give them not only political freedom but social and economic freedom, to be enjoyed in their daily lives. His assassination was more than a crime against one man, it a crime against the whole nation. It is for the new generation in Bangladesh to achieve Mujib's aim of a nation that is not only politically independent but which applies that independence to give a complete human life to all its citizens.

Kenneth Kaunda, the president of Zambia, said,

Sheikh Mujibur Rahman has inspired the Vietnamese people.

British Minister James Lamond said,

In the assassination of Bangabandhu, not only Bangladesh became an orphan, but the world also lost a great leader.

According to the Financial Times,

Bangladesh would never have been born without Mujib.

In one of the articles on 5 April 1982, the Time magazine mentioned,

Sheikh Mujibur Rahman's tenure was the first and longest democratic tenure in the first ten years of independent Bangladesh. After the assassination of Sheikh Mujib, the hero of the freedom struggle and the first elected Prime Minister, on August 15, 1975, the democratic rule came to an abrupt end.

Mujib was buried next to his parents in his birthplace Tungipara after his funeral there. However, public attendance at the funeral was kept limited and strictly regulated by the police and military forces, with many being obstructed on their way to the funeral. Others were buried in the Banani graveyard of Dhaka. Special services and prayers were held in several cities including Dhaka and Jessore.

== Previous attempts (1969–1972) ==
Since the post-Six Point Movement period in 1966, several assassination plots were devised against Bangabandhu Sheikh Mujibur Rahman reportedly by the Pakistani government and vested interest groups. Detailed accounts of these conspiracies are reported in declassified secret documents of the United States and various historical records.

=== 1969 Assassination Plot ===
According to declassified documents from the U.S. Consulate, Sheikh Mujibur Rahman first learned on 20 December 1969 that two assassins had been sent to Dhaka to assassinate him. This information was detailed in a special report dated 29 December 1969, sent from the then U.S. Consulate in Dhaka to the Secretary of State in Washington, D.C. According to the records, on 23 December 1969, Sheikh Mujibur Rahman disclosed this conspiracy during a meeting with Deputy Chief of Mission Sydney Sober and the Consul-in-charge. He mentioned that while he initially received the news on 20 December, he did not give it much importance at first. However, on 22 December, he obtained verified evidence regarding the plot and began taking it seriously. Following the exposure of the plan and after Bangabandhu informed the military authorities, the conspirators retreated. It is widely suspected that an influential faction within the Pakistani military or the ruling regime was involved in this plot.

=== 1970 Conspiracy ===
In 1970, at the instigation of Zulfikar Ali Bhutto, a Pakistani citizen named 'Aslam' was sent to Dhaka with the mission to assassinate Sheikh Mujibur Rahman. Aslam was proficient in the Bengali language and skilled in disguises. Under the guise of a journalist, he secured a job at a daily newspaper while orchestrating the blueprint for the assassination. Reports indicate that Aslam remained in Bangladesh until 1974.

=== Assassination attempt during 1971 imprisonment ===
Multiple attempts were reported to assassinate Sheikh Mujibur Rahman while he was imprisoned in Pakistan during the Bangladesh Liberation War in 1971. After a failed attempt on 18 August to assassinate him by poisoning his food, followers of then-President Yahya Khan planned to incite a riot within the prison to kill him under the guise of chaos. Bangabandhu later revealed that a sympathetic prison official had warned him of the danger. This official, who was aware of Yahya Khan's movements and inspection schedule, secretly escorted him out of the prison at 3:00 AM and hid him in his personal bungalow. He was kept there in total secrecy for four to six days without any military guards to ensure his safety.

=== 1972 Attempt ===
Following his release from Pakistan in 1972, during a stopover in London on his way back to Bangladesh, an individual named Dabir Siddiqui, reportedly backed by the Pakistani government, planned to assassinate Sheikh Mujibur Rahman at Heathrow Airport. However, the attempt was foiled due to the stringent security measures imposed by the British authorities. Later, when Bangabandhu visited Kolkata, India, another attempt was made on his life. Indian intelligence agencies uncovered the plot and arrested Dabir Siddique there. At Bangabandhu's request, Siddique was subsequently handed over to the Bangladesh Police. However, following the political change in 1975 and during the subsequent military regime, he was released from custody. In later years, Dabir Siddique also served as the President of the Dhaka Club.

== Literary interpretation of the assassination ==
The literary texts regarding the impact of the assassination of Sheikh Mujibur Rahman are categorized into three sections: (1) the literature which explains the background of the assassination; (2) the literature which describes the assassination incidences detailed or implied; and (3) the political polarization after the incidences.

=== Literary background ===
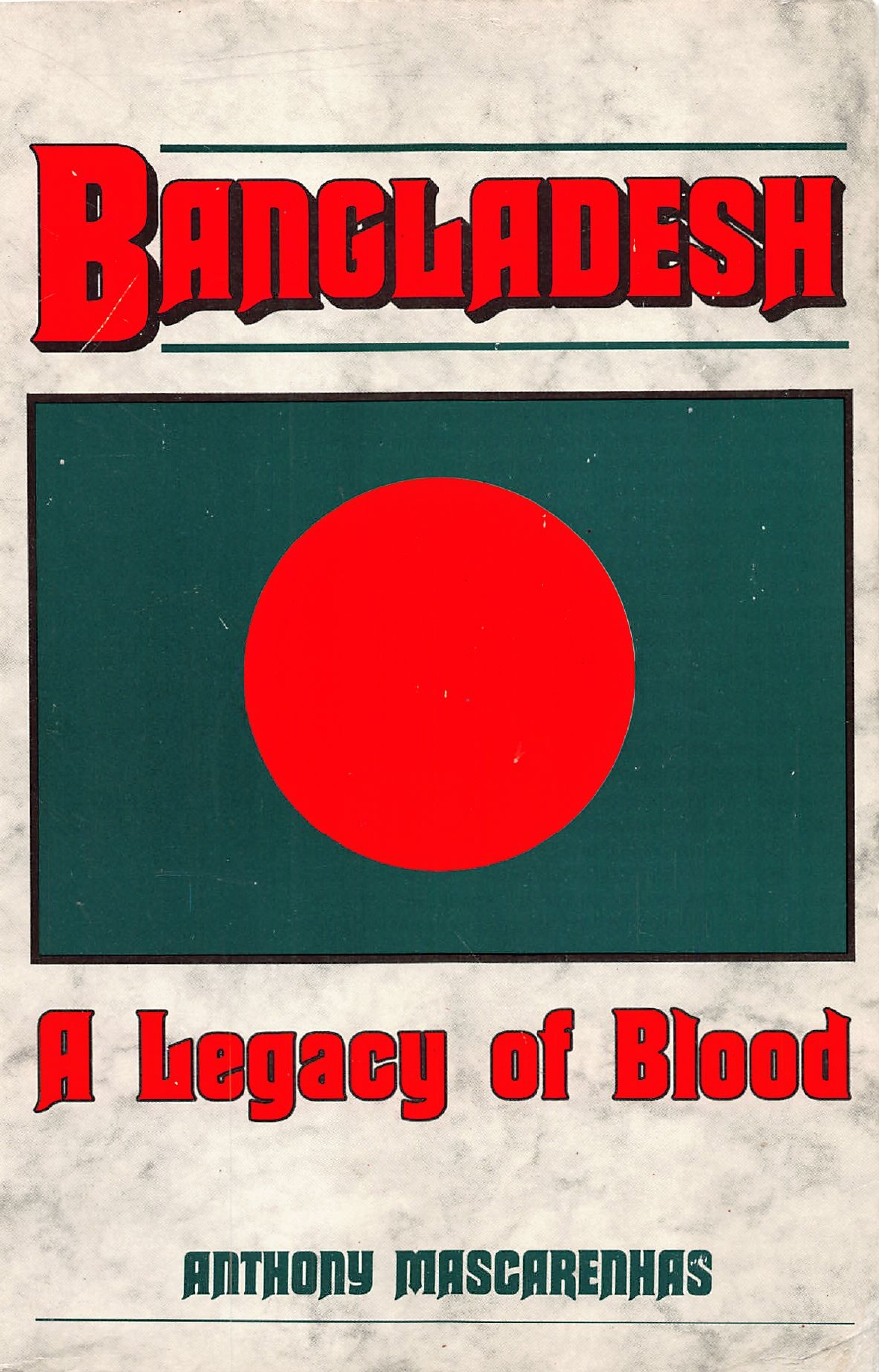
Bangladesh: A Legacy of Blood book cover.

The literature ranges from the year of the incident to recent works explaining the causes behind the assassination. Some literature that highlights the causes of the military coup include the books: Empires at war: a short history of modern Asia since World War II, A Political and Economic Dictionary of South Asia, and Cascades of Violence: War, Crime and Peacebuilding Across South Asia. A sect of literature highlight the rise of paramilitary groups such as the Jatiya Rakkhi Bahini and the Purba Banglar Sarbahara Party. Bangladesh: A Legacy of Blood is the book which knits the web of these factional elements and their operations in the decade of 70's. The economic meltdown, the flood in 1974 and the preceding famine are also discussed as factors in Democracy and Famine.

==== Military resentment ====
The 15 August 1975 Mujibur assassination marks the first direct military intervention in the then administration- centric Bangladesh politics. There are references on the condensation of the political misunderstanding among the "Jatiya Rakkhi Bahini" founded in 1972 by the patronization of Mujib, Mukti Bahini founded during the war time, and the military. It is reported that the military would receive 50-60% funding during the Pakistani period that the Muijb government reduced it to 13% that raised a tacit resentment among the military.

==== Rise of factional groups ====
The Liberation war ended. The occupied forces surrendered and left the country. Bangladesh then had to face a second-level of factionalism among the people in the country that literature portrays. The Good Muslim by Tahmima Anam presents the ravages of war, the confrontation with religious fundamentalism and the socio-political disharmony interplaying in the war torn country. The cover page of the book reads:

Set in Bangladesh at a time when Islamic fundamentalism is on the rise, The Good Muslim is an epic story about faith, family and the long shadow of war. Tahmima Anam, the prize-winning author of A Golden Age, offers a moving portrait of a sister and brother who struggle with the competing loyalties of love and belief as they cope with the lasting ravages of war and confront the deeply intimate roots of religious extremism. Echoing the intensity and humanity of Thrity Umrigar's The Space Between Us, Abraham Verghese's Cutting for Stone, and Kiran Desai's The Inheritance of Loss, Anam's "accomplished and gripping novel", in the words of author Pankaj Mishra, "describes not only the tumult of a great historical event, but also the small but heroic struggles of individuals living in the shadow of revolution and war".

The period 1971-1975 experienced the changes of role among the veterans due to their new orientation on the socio-economic-political scenarios. Siraj Sikdar was one of them who was one of the front line freedom fighters; yet he had to change his political aesthetics around 1973 and indulged in militancy by the name of "Proletarian Party". Antony Mascarenhas has commented in the "Bangladesh: A Legacy of Blood" (1986) that Shamim Shikder, sister of Siraj Sikder, blames the government for the death of him in the police custody on 3 January 1975.

==== Economic meltdown ====
Olivier Rubin in his book Democracy and Famine has remarked that one-party state is a reality if the famine engulfs the fragile democratic society. He pointed out the 1974 famine in Bangladesh as a case study. As a new independent country, Bangladesh had to experience economic crisis. The flood in July and August, 1974 triggered the crisis exponentially. Thus, food scarcity, improper distribution of leftover food reported to have 1 to 1.5 million of death in Bangladesh. This led the then Mujib government in question. And these critical atmospheres led to the assassination of the Father of the nation according to the case study of Olivier Rubin.

=== Incidents reflected in the literature ===
Apart from the news of electronic and print media; the novels, poetry, and performing arts draw the harrowing pictures of the assassination.

==== Novels ====
Deyal (Walls) is a novel by Humayun Ahmed that narrates the assassination of the father of the nation. This is the only novel that takes the assassination of Sheikh Mujibur Rahman as the background, though the novel raised some contradictions on the factual inconsistencies in some cases, and eventually the court declared ruling against the publication of the book without correction.

Critics say that Colonel Farooq, the killer of Bangabandhu, has been shown in this novel as a little great. However, Dr. Syed Manzoorul Islam has a distinct opinion that Humayun Ahmed had allowed him to read the draft copy of the wall. The opinion tells,

After reading the book, it did not seem that the villains had been made great. On the contrary, after reading the whole book, a kind of sincere respect and love for Bangabandhu was born in our minds

Deyal may be contradictory on the political ground; but it brings the legacy of Sheikh Mujibur Rahman that implicates the killing was a remarkable moment in the History of Bangladesh.

== In popular culture ==
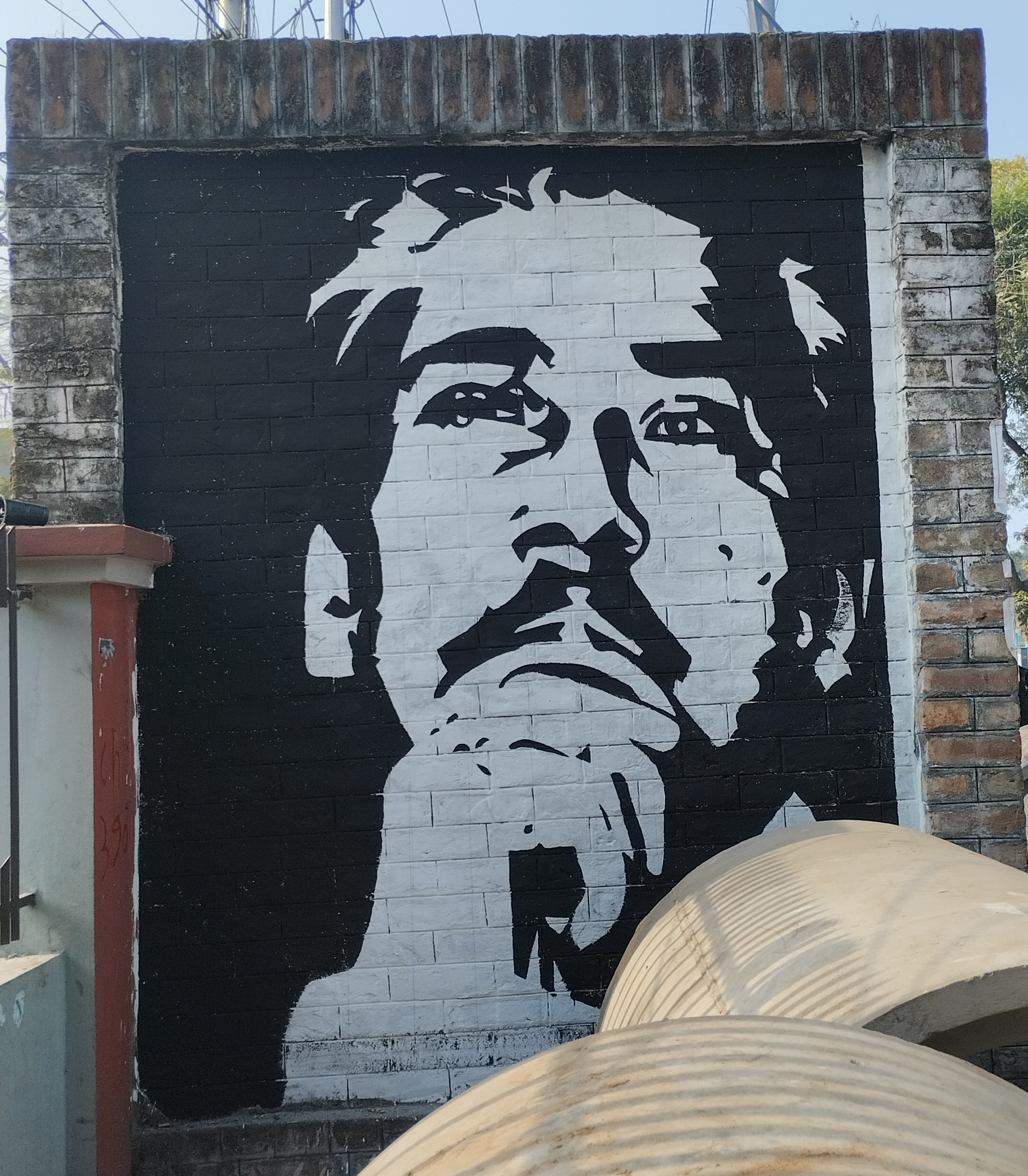
A graffiti at Bangladesh Agricultural University

=== Poetry ===
The first literary piece on the remembrance of Bangabandhu at his assassination was an elegy. It is reported and well documented that Moulovi Sheikh Abdul Halim, a village imam, at Tungipara was the first composer of the elegy in the memory of the death of Sheikh Mujibur Rahman. He was the man who laid down the assassinated man in the grave and conducted all the funeral rites. He wrote in emotion:

O great one—whose flesh, blood and bones are interred in this grave
Whose light lit up all of the subcontinent, and especially Bangladesh
I am dedicating myself to your grave, to you who is lying in this grave.

Poetry exceeded in numbers in comparison to other literary media to highlight the aftereffect of the assassination on 15 August 1975 and afterwards linked to the assassination of the founder of the nation. Nirmalendu Goon, Syed Shamsul Haque, Shamsur Rahman, Mahadev Saha were remarkable poets whose pen raised concern for the death of the father of the nation.

Khondakar Ashraf Hossain, who describes Goon as "the most political poet among us", says the assassination profoundly moved Goon and was a turning point in his poetry, which became marked by an "abhorrence of the world". He could not understand why his countrymen accepted the killing. Hossain calls Goon's reading at a Bangla Academy event of his "An elegy for Hasan", written after the death of his friend Abul Hasan in November 1975, the "first public protest" against the assassination.

The poet, Nurul Huda directly hinted to the loss of the country that Bangladesh had on 15 August 1975. His poem Fifteen August speaks;

Today it's empty and blazing all around,
Today all feel shattered to the core in grief,
All over Radha, Vanga, Harikela, Samatata ,
Let heavy rains pour on the Bangalees' thunderstruck chest

The poets of the West Bengal were likely moved by this incidents and they had to write elegiac notes, and eulogy for Bangabandhu. The poet and essayist Annada Shankar Roy writes, in his poem, Bangabandhu, that

As long as the rivers Padma, Jamuna,
Gauri, Meghna run,
So long will survive your glory
Bangabandhu Sheikh Mujibur Rahman.

Shamsur Rahman had political and historical conscience and he could duly reflect them in his poetry. The being of Bangladesh and its struggle against tyranny is visible in the lines. Bangabandhu covered a great spaces in his writings related to the liberation war, political upheavals and even the assassination taken place in 1975. The poems referred highlight the loss, repentance, agony, and anger for the perpetrators who grasped the statue of freedom to vandalize it:

- Bangladesh Swapna Dekhe ('Bangladesh Dreams')
- Dhaynya Sei Purush ('The Successful Man')
- Nam ('Name')
- Bhaskar Purush ('An Enlightened Man')
- Tomar Nam Ek Biplab ('Revolution Is Thy Name')
- Sonar Murtir Kahini ('A History of Golden Statue')

The writer did not stop here only with the drops of tears. He dreamed of the revenge for this. Here "The Song of Electra" (Electrar Gaan) in the poetry "The Sky of Ikarus" (Ikraser Akash) (1982) reveals the motif of vengeance with the allusion of the mythical story of Electra who had intention to avenge for the killing of her father "Agamemnon". She reveals "My heat burns as a Red Hibiscus with the fire of Vengeance" (64).

=== Films ===
After the carnage happened on 15 August 1975; several coup d'états took place and on the third of November in 1975, killing of the four national leaders in the custody was second in importance. Yet, few grand literatures are written in these times of Bangladeshi history. However, August 1975, a film directed by Selim Khan is a memorable contribution in the case of performing art. This film portrays the situations prevailing after the assassination of Mujibur Rahman.

The 2007 television film Palashi Theke Dhanmondi (From Palashi to Dhanmondi), depicts the conspiracy behind the assassination of Mujib and his family, comparing it with the defeat of Nawab Siraj ud-Daulah at the Battle of Plassey in 1757 and the conspiracy behind his death.

The 2024 film 570, portrays the 36-hour timeline from the assassination until Mujib's burial.

=== Songs ===
A song that creates an eternal appeal is "Jodi Raat Pohale Shona Jeto" (If the dawn spread the resurrection).

If the dawn spread the resurrection

Of Bangabandhu,

If the highways became crowdy with procession

That 'We want His freedom';

The world could have a great leader

The Bangalee could get their father.

The man never bowed down like a coward,

Before the tyrants and miscreants,

He rather snatched back our freedom

From the clutches of heinous occupants.

No one is so great a Bangalee

That the history repeats someday,

You can never cover up the truth

That will peep out of the fake.

Hasan Matiur Raham is the songwriter; Moloy Kumar Ganguly is the music composer and the singer for this song. In 1990, Matiur Rahman wrote this song and Moloy Kumar, the singer for the Swadhin Bangla Betar Kendra composed the music. He expressed that it took 15 minutes for him to make it as a song. This song first recorded in the production company of Hasan Matiur Rahman in 1991 for the election campaign of Bangladesh Awami League. This song is made to sing by Sabina Yasmin in 1997 and Farid Ahmed arranged the music for this remake.

== See also ==
- Sheikh Mujibur Rahman's cult of personality
- Controversies related to Sheikh Hasina
- Criticism of Awami League
- Political narrative
- Assassination of Khaled Mosharraf
- Assassination of Ziaur Rahman
- The Black Coat
- Bangabandhu Memorial Museum
- Bangladesh: A Legacy of Blood
- Civil–military relations
- Cold war
- Deyal
- Shahed Ali Patwary
- Invasion of Banu Qaynuqa
- Aniconism in Islam
- Political aspects of Islam
- Al-Hajjaj ibn Yusuf
- Ulu'l-amr
- Verse of obedience
- Jail Killing Day
- List of assassinated and executed heads of state and government
- Military coups in Bangladesh
- National Revolution and Solidarity Day
- Trojan War
