= Sharmin murder case =

Criminal case of Bangladesh

The Sharmin murder case was a notorious criminal case in Bangladesh. Munir Hussain, a wealthy industrialist, killed his wife of four months, Sharmin Rima, on the night of 8/9 April 1989. It was the culmination of a long-running affair with his mistress Hosne Ara Khuku, a middle-aged married woman.

Both Munir and Sharmin came from prominent families—Munir was the son of Dr. Meherunnessa, a renowned physician, and Sharmin was the daughter of a journalist, Nizamuddin Ahmed, who had been killed in the Bangladesh Liberation War by the Al-Badr paramilitary.

Munir killed Sharmin along the Chittagong-Dhaka highway, and dumped her body near Mijmizi village in Narayanganj District. He was arrested the following day.

The murder investigation and the subsequent trial was widely covered in the press, with every new revelation generating dramatic headlines over the course of several months.

The trial concluded on 21 May 1990. Munir and Khuku were both found guilty and sentenced to death. Two years later, in July 1992, an appellate court overturned Khuku's sentence and acquitted her of all charges. Munir's death sentence was upheld throughout several legal appeals and mercy petitions. He was hanged on 27 July 1993.
