= Taheruddin Thakur =

Bangladeshi politician (died 2009)

- তাহেরউদ্দিন ঠাকুর
- Died: 17 February 2009; Dhaka, Bangladesh

Taheruddin Thakur (died 17 February 2009) was a Bangladeshi politician. He served as the Minister of State for Information at the cabinet of President Sheikh Mujibur Rahman.

== Career ==
Thakur was arrested on 14 August 1996 over the assassination of Sheikh Mujibur Rahman on 15 August 1975. He was later acquitted. On 20 October 2004, the Metropolitan Sessions Judge's Court (Trial Court) acquitted Thakur of another charge in the Jail Killing case.

Thakur worked as a journalist at The Daily Ittefaq. He died on 17 February 2009 after suffering from kidney disease.
