= Mohammad Bazlul Huda =

Bangladeshi military personnel

- মোহাম্মদ বজলুল হুদা
- Born: January 19, 1949; Alamdanga, East Bengal, Pakistan
- Died: 28 January 2010 (aged 61); Dhaka Central Jail, Bangladesh
- Status: Executed by hanging
- Conviction: Murder
- Penalty: Death
- Military career
- Allegiance: Pakistan (Before 1971); Bangladesh
- Branch: Pakistan Army; Bangladesh Army
- Service years: 1968–1980
- Rank: Lieutenant Colonel
- Unit: Regiment of Artillery
- Commands: Deputy Commander of K Force; 2IC of 1st Field Artillery Regiment; Commanding officer of 4th Field Artillery Regiment
- Known for: Assassination of Sheikh Mujibur Rahman
- Conflicts: Bangladesh Liberation War; 15 August 1975 Bangladesh coup d'état

Mohammad Bazlul Huda (died 28 January 2010) was a Bangladeshi army officer who was the key perpartrator of the 15 August coup d'état. On 28 January 2010, Bazlul was executed in Old Dhaka Central Jail.

== Career ==
In 1973, Captain Huda was posted to 1st Field Artillery Regiment in Comilla Cantonment along with Major Shariful Haque Dalim. Dalim had gotten into a scuffle with the sons of Awami League leader Gazi Golam Mostafa. Later some officers and soldiers attacked the residence of Mostofa. The officers, including Major Dalim, lost their commissions in Bangladesh Army because of indiscipline shortly after.

Huda met with other conspirators to finalize the plans on 14 August 1975. On 15 August 1975, Huda was part of the mutinous troops that attacked the home of President Sheikh Mujibur Rahman. Huda along with Major S.H.M.B Noor Chowdhury shot dead Sheikh Mujib as he was coming down the stairs. Major Syed Faruque Rahman promoted Captain Huda to Major at the home of Sheikh Mujib after Mujib and his family members were killed. The assassins were protected by the government of Khondaker Mostaq Ahmad that took power next, through the passage of 1975 Indemnity Ordinance.

In August 1989 Huda had ordered Freedom Party, the party founded by the mutinous officers, activists to attack the Bangabandhu Bhaban when Sheikh Hasina was staying there. On 11 February 1990, a Bangladesh Awami League rally was attacked by activists of Freedom Party killing one member of Bangladesh Awami League. Huda was arrested while fleeing from the spot.

== Trial ==
On 2 October 1996, AFM Mohitul Islam filed a case over the murder of Sheikh Mujib and most of his family members in 1975. Dhaka sessions court on 8 November 1998 had given death sentences to Huda and 14 co-defendants. The convicts filled an appeal with Bangladesh High Court. The High court gave a split verdict with one judge confirming the death penalty of all 15 while another confirmed it for 10 of the accused on 14 December 2000. A third judge only confirmed the sentence of 12 of the accused. On 19 November 2009, Bangladesh Supreme Court confirmed the death sentences of 12 of the accused. On 1996, Huda was arrested in Bangkok, Thailand on charges of shoplifting and ordered to be deported to Bangladesh. He declared himself stateless and applied for asylum with the U.N. High Commissioner for Refugees.

== Death ==
On 28 January 2010, Huda was hanged at Dhaka Central Jail along with four other co-conspirators. Sheikh Hasina was allegedly present. She saw her father's murderer hanging. After the fall of Hasina, Huda's family filed a murder case on her and others for his alleged killing.
