= AFM Mohitul Islam =

Bangladeshi politician (d. 2016)

- এএফএম মহিতুল ইসলাম

Personal Assistant to the President of Bangladesh

Personal details
- Died: 25 August 2016 (Dhaka)
- Party: Bangladesh Awami League

AFM Mohitul Islam was a Bangladesh Awami League activist and the personal assistant to the first president of Bangladesh, Sheikh Mujibur Rahman. He witnessed the assassination of Sheikh Mujibur Rahman and filled a police case in this regard.

== Career ==
=== Bangladesh Liberation War ===
Islam had fought in the Bangladesh Liberation War. He was a member of the Mujib Bahini. He surrendered his arms after the independence of Bangladesh. He joined the government of Bangladesh as an office branch assistant. While carrying files to the president from the chief secretary's office, he was liked by the president. He was transferred as the President's personal assistant.

=== Assassination ===
On 15 August 1975, President Sheikh Mujibur Rahman was assassinated by a group of Bangladesh army officers. He was then the assistant to the president and the receptionist at his residence. He witnessed the assassination. In October 1976 he tried to file a case at the Lalbagh Police Station. He was assaulted by on-duty police officers as the assassins were still in power. He was able to file the case on 2 October 1996 when Sheikh Mujib's Awami League. The verdict in the case came in November 2009. The Awami League government nullified the indemnity act which protected the assassins from prosecution. Five of the convicted assassins were executed in January 2010.

=== Post assassination ===
Islam was injured in the assassination attempt, he fled the hospital to his village home is Jessore but was captured by the army. He was tortured in custody. Sheikh Mujib's APS Shahriar ZR Iqbal had helped Islam get released from custody. He continued his government job, becoming the director at the Directorate of Relief. He was removed from his office in 2002 after the Bangladesh Nationalist Party-Jamaat-I-Islami alliance came to power.

== Death ==
He died on 25 August 2016 in Bangabandhu Sheikh Mujib Medical University, Dhaka, Bangladesh. He was buried in Kashimpur, Manirampur, Jessore.
