= 1975 Jail Killing =

Extrajudicial killing of four national leaders of Bangladesh in 1975

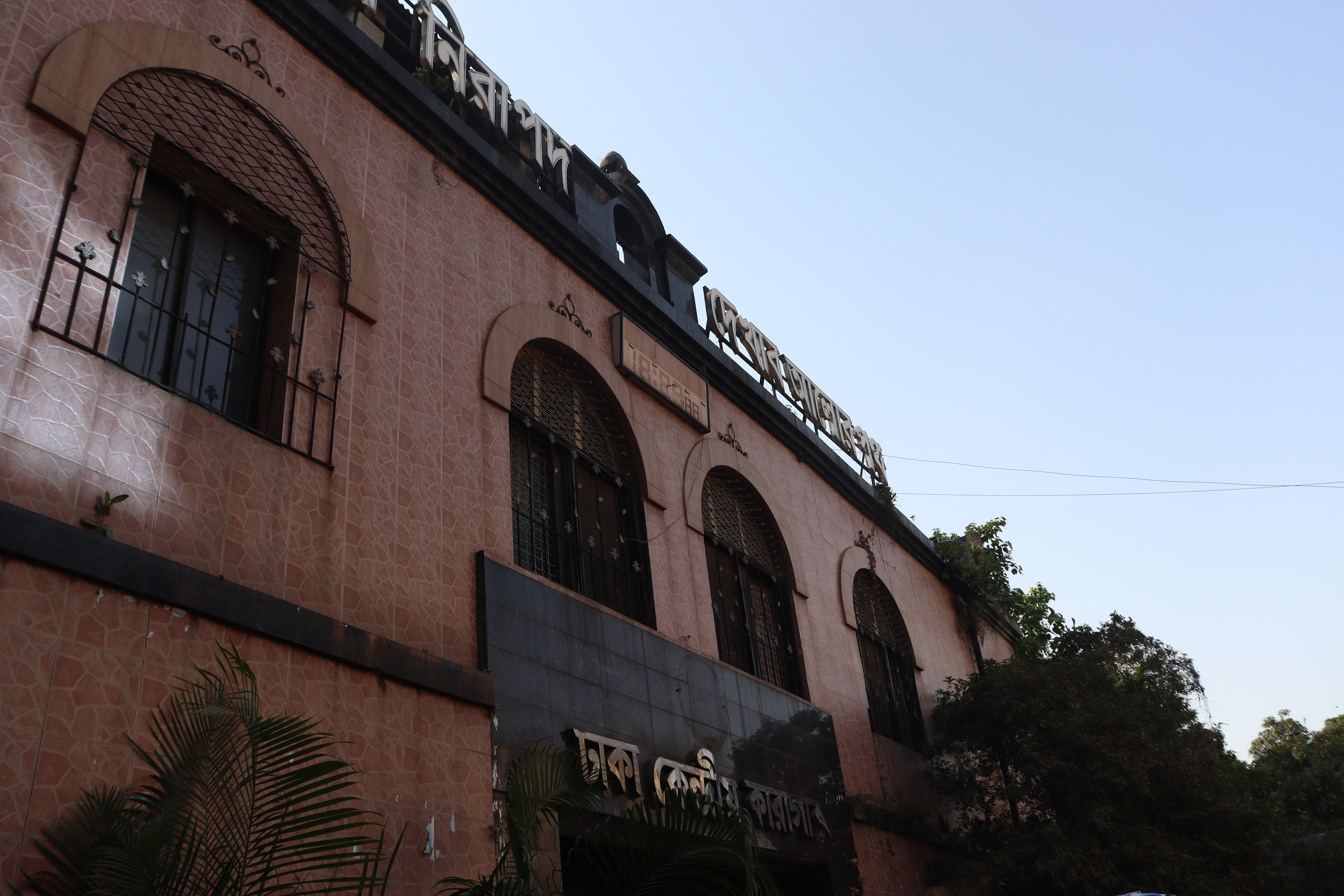
- Old Dhaka Central Jail, the site of the assassination.
- Location: Old Dhaka Central Jail, Dhaka, Bangladesh
- Date: 3 November 1975; 50 years ago 04:10 AM (BST)
- Target: Tajuddin Ahmad; Syed Nazrul Islam; Muhammad Mansur Ali; A.H.M. Qamaruzzaman
- Attack type: Assassination, Extrajudicial killing
- Weapons: 9mm Sten Carbine; Type 56 assault rifle
- Deaths: 4
- Assailant: A group of junior army officers led by Moslemuddin
- No. of participants: 5
- Accused: 23
- Charges: Murder
- Verdict: Death by hanging: Moslemuddin, Marfat Ali Shah, Abul Hashem Mridha; Life imprisonment: Farooq, Rashid, Noor, Huda, Rashed, Shahriar, Mohiuddin, Dalim, Majed, Hashem, Nazmul and Sharful
- Convicted: 15

The Jail Killing (Bengali: জেল হত্যা, romanized: Jail hotya) refers to the murder of four national leaders of the Bangladesh Liberation War in Bangladesh by a group of junior army officers who carried out a coup d'état there on 15 August 1975. The four killed were former vice-president Syed Nazrul Islam, former prime minister Tajuddin Ahmad and Muhammad Mansur Ali, and former home minister A. H. M. Qamaruzzaman.

== Background ==
On 15 August 1975, President Sheikh Mujibur Rahman was killed in a coup d'état, and the Awami League led government was overthrown.

== History ==
The military administration had placed around 50 Awami League activists, including the four senior Awami League leaders, in Dhaka Central Jail. The four were former president Syed Nazrul Islam, former prime ministers Tajuddin Ahmed and Muhammad Mansur Ali, and president of the Awami League Abul Hasnat Muhammad Qamaruzzaman. On 3 November 1975, jailer Aminur Rahman was ordered to take the four leaders from their separate rooms and placed them in one room. Aminur was told that an important representative of the Khondaker Mostaq Ahmad government would meet them.

Four army officers led by Moslemuddin were refused entry to the jail by the deputy inspector general of prisons but were eventually allowed in on the orders of President Ahmad. The army personnel marched into the jail and shot the four leaders in their jail cell, killing all except Muhammad Mansur Ali. After hearing the groans and dying Ali call for water, one of the prison guards, Motaleb, informed the jail officials. An amry team who had returned to the entrance of the jail, returned and bayoneted all four leaders in their jail cells resulting in their death.

== Aftermath ==
On 3 November 1975, Major General Khaled Mosharraf and Colonel Shafaat Jamil launched a successful counter coup to remove President Khondaker Mostaq Ahmad and the killers of Sheikh Mujibur Rahman from power.

== Trial ==
=== Investigation ===
A first information report was filed with Lalbagh police station about the four murders, and its officer in charge, ABM Fazlul Karim, was tasked with investigating the incident. Deputy Superintendent of Police Saifuddin Ahmed was appointed the investigation officer, but he was not allowed to visit the jail cell. From 1975 to 1995, the investigation did not proceed due to lack of interest from different governments. Investigation started after the Awami League was elected to power in 1996, the first Awami League government since 1975. The post mortem reports and police investigation files disappeared. A judicial commission was created to investigate the incident but failed to complete their investigation, and their files disappeared at the concerned ministry. The Indemnity Ordinance, 1975 provided protection to the army officers involved in the killing. Abdul Kahar Akond of the Criminal Investigation Department was appointed investigator of the case.

On 15 October 1998, a charge sheet was presented against 23 accused in relation to the jail killings.

=== Verdict ===
Metropolitan Sessions Judge Motiur Rahman issued an arrest warrant against Deputy Superintendent of Police Saifuddin Ahmed on 30 September 2004 after he failed to appear before the court due to ill health. Bangladesh Nationalist Party member of parliament KM Obaidur Rahman described the trial as harassment. Two accused, Taheruddin Thakur and Shah Moazzem Hossain, were out on bail.

The Metropolitan Sessions Court found 15 of the 20 accused in the case guilty. Marfot Ali Shah, Moslemuddin, and Abdul Hashem Mridha were sentenced to death. Abdul Majed, Ahmed Sharful Hossain, A.K.M. Mohiuddin Ahmed, Khandaker Abdur Rashid, Mohammad Bazlul Huda, Mohammad Kismat Hashem, Nazmul Hossain Ansar, Syed Faruque Rahman, Sultan Shahriar Rashid Khan, Shariful Haque Dalim, S. H. M. B. Noor Chowdhury, and Rashed Chowdhury were sentenced to life imprisonment. Mohamed Khairuzzaman, KM Obaidur Rahman, Shah Moazzem Hossain, Nurul Islam Manzur and Taheruddin Thakur were found innocent of all charges.

On 29 August 2008, Justice Nozrul Islam Chowdhury and Justice Md. Ataur Rahman Khan of the Bangladesh High Court issued a verdict on the appeal of the 2004 judgement. The court upheld the sentence of only Moslemuddin. The court found AKM Mohiuddin Ahmed, Abul Hashem Mridha, Bazlul Huda, Marfat Ali Shah, Syed Farook Rahman, and Sultan Shahriar Rashid Khan, innocent of all charges.

In 2010, Attorney General of Bangladesh, Mahbubey Alam, announced plans to appeal the High Court verdict.

In 2013, a full bench of the Bangladesh Supreme Court, composed of Chief Justice Md. Muzammel Hossain, Justice Nazmun Ara Sultana, Justice Md. Abdul Wahhab Miah, Justice Surendra Kumar Sinha, Justice Syed Mahmud Hossain, and Justice Muhammad Imman Ali, gave a verdict in the appeal of the jail killing case. The bench upheld the death sentences of Marfat Ali Shah and Abul Hashem Mridha which the Bangladesh High Court bench had removed.

Asaduzzaman Khan, the minister of home affairs, stated that the government was trying to enforce the Supreme Court verdict. In 2022 the Awami League government was trying to bring one accused, Mohamed Khairuzzaman, back from Malaysia, where he had served as the ambassador of Bangladesh. Rashed Chowdhury is in the United States, and Noor Chowdhury is in Canada. Abdul Majed was detained on 7 April 2020 and executed on 12 April.

== Legacy ==
3 November is remembered as Jail Killing Day in Bangladesh. Annual programs are organised throughout the country to mark the day.
