= Abdul Majed =

Bangladeshi military officer (died 2020)

- আব্দুল মাজেদ
- Born: 22 June 1948; Batmara, East Bengal, Pakistan
- Died: 12 April 2020 (aged 72); Dhaka Central Jail, Bangladesh
- Status: Executed by hanging
- Conviction: Murder (assassination of Sheikh Mujibur Rahman)
- Penalty: Death
- Military career
- Allegiance: Bangladesh
- Branch: Bangladesh Army
- Service years: 1970–1980
- Rank: Captain
- Unit: East Bengal Regiment
- Commands: Adjutant of Bengal Lancers
- Known for: Assassination of Sheikh Mujibur Rahman

Abdul Majed (22 June 1948 – 12 April 2020) was a Bangladeshi military officer who was convicted for his role in the assassination of Sheikh Mujibur Rahman, the founding president of Bangladesh.

== Career ==
Majed was a captain in the Bangladesh Army. He was appointed to the Bangladeshi Embassy in Senegal. He retired from the Bangladesh Army in 1980 and joined the civil administration as a deputy secretary. He worked at the Bangladesh Inland Water Transport Corporation. He was promoted to the rank of secretary. He joined the Ministry of Youth and Sports as the director of youth development. He was appointed the director of the National Savings Directorate. He disappeared in 1997 after Sheikh Hasina, daughter of Sheikh Mujibur Rahman, was elected Prime Minister of Bangladesh.

== Conviction and execution ==
On 14 August 1975, Majed and other officers looted weapons from the Bengal Lancers armory. On 15 August 1975, Sheikh Mujibur Rahman and most of his family members were killed in the 15 August 1975 Bangladesh coup d'état. Majed and the other officers met at the Bangabhaban and created a new government with Khandaker Mushtaq Ahmed in charge. He was part of the team that attacked the residence of Abdur Rab Serniabat, brother-in-law of Sheikh Mujibur Rahman.

On 2 November 1975, Majed and the other army officers involved in the assassination of Sheikh Mujibur Rahman met Khandaker Mushtaq Ahmed at the Bangabhaban. There a decision was made to carry out the Jail Killing to kill four national leaders of the Bangladesh Awami League. The leaders were Abul Hasnat Muhammad Qamaruzzaman, Muhammad Mansur Ali, Syed Nazrul Islam, and Tajuddin Ahmed.

In 1998, Majed was sentenced to death for the assassination of Sheikh Mujibur Rahman by a trial court.

On 19 November 2009, Majed's death sentence was confirmed by the Supreme Court of Bangladesh along with 12 other convicts. Five of the convicts were executed on 27 January 2010. They were AKM Mohiuddin Ahmed, Bazlul Huda, Mohiuddin Ahmed, Syed Farooq Rahman, and Sultan Shahriar Rashid Khan. Another convict, Abdul Aziz Pasha, died in Zimbabwe. The convicts who absconded were Majed, Khandaker Abdur Rashid, Noor Chowdhury, Risaldar Moslehuddin Khan, Rashed Chowdhury, and Shariful Haque Dalim.

In 2015, the government of Bangladesh confiscated Majed's properties in Bangladesh, which included 1.35 acres in the Borhanuddin Municipality in Bhola District. On 28 August 2008, he was sentenced to life imprisonment for the jail killing case.

Majed was arrested on 7 April 2020 at Mirpur by the Counter Terrorism and Transnational Crime unit of the Dhaka Metropolitan Police. He was sent to Dhaka Central Jail, Keraniganj, by a court in Dhaka. He told Bangladesh police officers that he had been hiding in Kolkata for the last 23 years. Majed was executed by hanging on 12 April.
