= Moslemuddin =

Officer of the Bangladesh Army and Participant of Coup

Moslemuddin Khan
- Born: 31 July 1937 (age 89); Narsingdi, Bengal, British India
- Military career
- Allegiance: Pakistan (Before 1971); Bangladesh
- Branch: Pakistan Army Bangladesh Army
- Service years: 1960–1981
- Rank: Siladar
- Unit: Armoured Corps
- Known for: 15 August 1975 Bangladeshi coup Jail Killing
- Conflicts: Indo-Pakistan War of 1971
- Awards: Bir Protik (revoked)

Moslemuddin Khan (born 31 July 1937), also known as Rafiqul Islam Khan, is a junior-commissioned officer(JCO) of the Bangladesh Army who was convicted for his role in the 15 August 1975 Bangladeshi coup and the subsequent jail killings. He was sentenced to death in absentia and is currently a fugitive.

== Biography ==
Khan was born in Narsingdi, British India, on 31 July 1937.

=== Bangladesh Liberation War ===
Moslemuddin fought in the Bangladesh Liberation War in 1971 and was awarded Bir Protik, the fourth highest gallantry award, for his actions during the war. However, Moslemuddin's award was revoked in 2021, along with the gallantry awards of the other army officers involved in the assassination of Sheikh Mujib.

=== 15 August 1975 coup ===
Major Farook, the mastermind of the 15 August 1975 coup, assigned Moslemuddin with the task of killing Sheikh Moni, a nephew of Sheikh Mujib. When Moslemuddin arrived at Sheikh Moni's house with two trucks of soldiers, Moni was woken up by the noise. When Moni came outside, Moslemuddin tried to grab hold of Moni. When Moni's pregnant wife tried to protect him, Moslemuddin opened fire with a Sten gun, killing them both.

After killing Moni, Moslemuddin and his men drove to Sheikh Mujib's house, where he and Major Aziz Pasha entered with their men. By the time they entered, Sheikh Mujib had already been killed. Moslemuddin and Pasha gunned down Fazilatunnesa Mujib, Sheikh Jamal, Rosy Jamal, and Sultana Kamal.

=== 3 November 1975 jail killing ===
After the 15 August coup, Khondaker Mostaq Ahmed became the new president. In the event that Mostaq was overthrown, Major Farook had a prearranged plan. He had formed a "hunter-killer team" consisting of Moslemuddin and several other soldiers, who would go to Dhaka Central Jail and kill the four imprisoned leaders:

- Former vice-president Syed Nazrul Islam
- Former prime minister of Bangladesh Tajuddin Ahmed
- Former home minister A H M Quamruzzaman
- Captain (retired) Mansur Ali

When General Khaled Mosharraf launched his counter-coup on 3 November 1975, Farook's plan was set in motion. Wearing black uniforms, Moslemuddin and several other soldiers drove to Dhaka Central Jail and demanded to see the four imprisoned leaders. When the DIG prisons refused to comply, Moslemuddin told him to call Major Rashid, who was at Bangabhaban. The DIG prisons called Major Rashid, who told him to do whatever Moslemuddin says. However, the DIG prisons was still unsure, so he called President Mostaq Ahmed, who verified Major Rashid's instructions.

After the phone call with Mostaq Ahmed, the DIG prisons let Moslemuddin and his men enter the prison. The four imprisoned leaders were taken to one cell and fired upon with automatic weapons. In Bangladesh: A Legacy of Blood, Anthony Mascarenhas claims that three of the leaders died immediately, while Tajuddin Ahmed was still alive when Moslemuddin and his men were leaving, but slowly bled to death. However, another source states that a prison guard informed Moslemuddin that one of the leaders was still alive. Upon hearing this, Moslemuddin and his men attached bayonets to their guns and bayoneted the four leaders to ensure their death.

After the jail killings, Moslemuddin flew to Libya via Bangkok along with the other army officers involved in the 15 August 1975 coup.

=== Diplomatic postings ===
Under the government of Lt. General Ziaur Rahman, the army officers involved in the 15 August 1975 coup were given diplomatic postings as "rewards". Moslemuddin was given diplomatic postings in Tehran and Jeddah.

== Trial ==
After Sheikh Hasina came to power in 1996, Moslemuddin fled Bangladesh. On 8 November 1998, a Dhaka court sentenced 15 men to death for their role in the assassination of Sheikh Mujib, including Moslemuddin, who was tried in absentia. On 20 October 2004, Moslemuddin was also given the death sentence for his role in the jail killings.

In April 2020, the media reported that Moslemuddin had been arrested in West Bengal, following the arrest of Captain (retired) Abdul Majed. However, this was incorrect, as the Bangladeshi government was still looking for Moslemuddin even after 2021.
