= Jail Killing Day =

Commemoration of the killing of four national leaders of Bangladesh

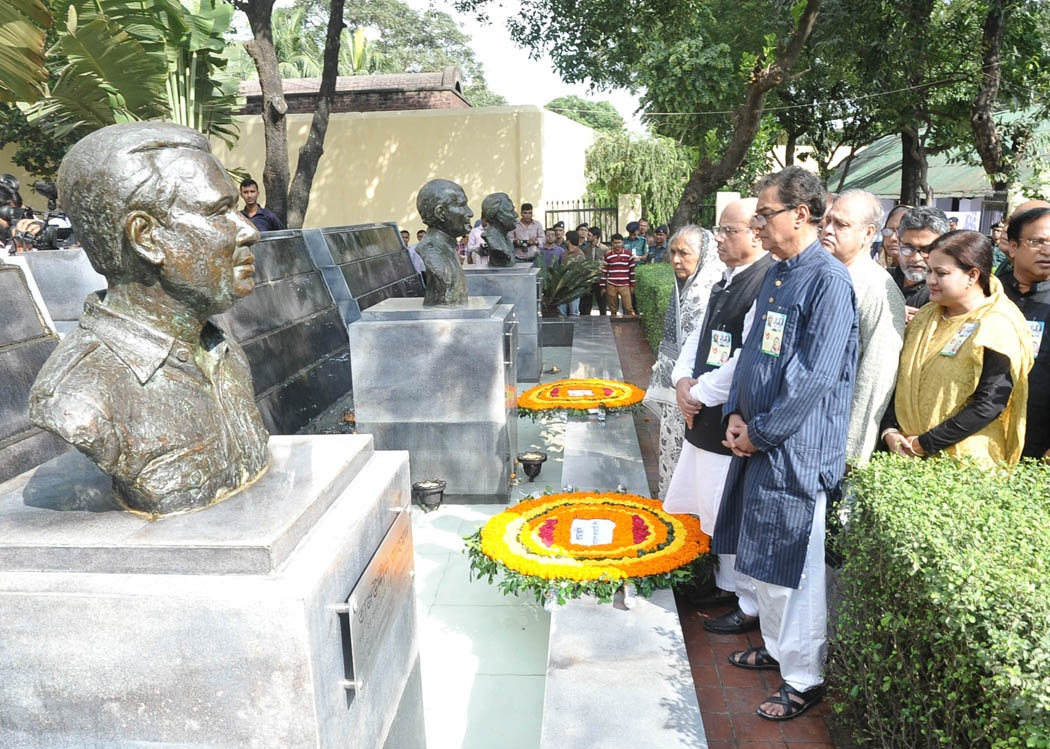
- Martyred leaders' monument at the Jail Killing site, Old Dhaka Central Jail
- Official name: Jail Killing Day
- Observed by: Bangladesh
- Type: National mourning day
- Significance: Commemorating the 1975 assassination and extrajudicial killing of the four national leaders of Bangladesh
- Celebrations: Wreath-laying, prayers, seminars, and discussion meetings
- Date: 3 November

Jail Killing Day (Bengali: জেল হত্যা দিবস) is observed on 3 November every year in Bangladesh. It commemorates the killing of the country's four national leaders: former vice-president Syed Nazrul Islam, former prime minister Tajuddin Ahmed, Captain (Rtd.) Mansur Ali, and former home minister A H M Quamruzzaman on this date in 1975.

== History ==
=== Killing ===
Sheikh Mujibur Rahman, the founding president of Bangladesh was killed in a military coup; the coup leaders were subsequently overthrown in a counter coup by Brigadier Khaled Musharraf. The assassins were to be sent into exile, but before they left they decided to kill the four leaders imprisoned in Dhaka Central jail. Vice-president Syed Nazrul Islam, former Prime Minister of Bangladesh Tajuddin Ahmed and Captain (Rtd.) Mansur Ali, and former Home Minister A H M Quamruzzaman were shot and bayoneted by group of junior army officers inside Old Dhaka Central Jail.

=== Victims ===
- Syed Nazrul Islam – was the vice-president and acting president of Mujibnagar Government, the first government of Bangladesh. He was the former vice-chairman of BAKSAL.
- Tajuddin Ahmed – was a lawyer, politician and the first Prime Minister of Bangladesh. He was a former finance minister and a member of parliament.
- Abul Hasnat Muhammad Qamaruzzaman – was a member of parliament, he was elected president of Awami League in 1974. He was the Minister of Relief and Rehabilitation in the Mujibnagar government.
- Muhammad Mansur Ali – was the Finance minister of Mujibnagar government. He was the Prime Minister of Bangladesh in the Baksal government.

=== Trial ===
Nearly 29 years after the killings, those responsible went to trial. In the judgement, which was pronounced on 20 October 2004, during the premiership of Begum Khaleda Zia, three fugitive former army personnel were sentenced to death, 12 former army personnel were sentenced to life term imprisonment and five people, including four senior politicians, including Bangladesh Nationalist Party (BNP) leaders A KM Obaidur Rahman, Shah Moazzem Hossain, Nurul Islam Monzoor, Taheruddin Thakur and the then additional foreign secretary Khairuzzaman, were acquitted.

On 28 August 2008, the High Court division of Supreme Court of Bangladesh acquitted six former military men of the Jail Killing Case. Those who were found not guilty of the crime include Syed Faruque Rahman, Sultan Shahriar Rashid Khan, Bazlul Huda and A K M Mohiuddin Ahmed, all these men were executed in 2009 for their involvement in Assassination of Sheikh Mujibur Rahman. This acquittal is being appealed to the Appellate Division of Supreme Court of Bangladesh by the prosecution.

The individuals who received capital punishment included

- Lieutenant Colonel (Rtd.) Syed Faruque Rahman (appeals exhausted)
- Lieutenant Colonel (Rtd.) Sultan Shahriar Rashid Khan (appeals exhausted)
- Major (Rtd.) Mohammad Bazlul Huda (appeals exhausted)
- Major (Rtd.) A.K.M. Mohiuddin Ahmed (appeals exhausted)
- Lieutenant Colonel (Rtd.) Khondakar Abdur Rashid (absconded, now living in Libya and Pakistan)
- Lieutenant Colonel (Rtd.) Shariful Haque Dalim (absconded, now living in Pakistan)
- Lt. Col. S.H.M.B Noor Chowdhury (absconded, now living in Canada)
- Lt. Col. Rashed Chowdhury (retired) (absconded, now living in the United States)
- Major Ahmed Sharful Hossain (retired) (absconded)
- Captain Abdul Majed (retired) (arrested on 7 April 2020 in Dhaka, executed on 12 April 2020)
- Captain (Rtd.) Mohammad Kismat Hashem (absconded, died in Canada)
- Captain (Rtd.) Nazmul Hossain Ansar (absconded, now living in Canada)
- Risalder (retd) Muslemuddin
- Dafadar (dismissed) Marfat Ali Shah
- Dafadar (dismissed) Abdul Hashem Mridha
