= Nazmul Hossain Ansar =

Bangladesh Army officer

- Born: 27 July 1952 (age 74); Dacca, East Bengal, Pakistan
- Military career
- Allegiance: Pakistan (before 1972); Bangladesh
- Branch: Pakistan Army; Bangladesh Army
- Service years: 1970–1981
- Rank: Captain
- Unit: East Bengal Regiment
- Known for: Jail Killing

Nazmul Hossain Ansar (born 27 July 1952) is a former Bangladesh Army officer. He was convicted for the 1975 Jail Killing of four national leaders of Bangladesh following the assassination of Sheikh Mujibur Rahman, the president of Bangladesh. He is wanted by Bangladeshi authorities and is currently residing in Canada.

== Career ==
Ansar was involved in the 15 August 1975 Bangladesh coup d'état that killed Sheikh Mujibur Rahman and removed his government from power. He helped form the post-coup government led by Khanadaker Moshtaque Ahmed.

After the coup, Ansar was appointed third secretary at the Bangladesh High Commission in Canada. He was also promoted to the rank of captain.

The government of Bangladesh requested his extradition in 1998 from Canada.

On 1 May 2010, Ansar was acquitted in the case over the assassination of Sheikh Mujibur Rahman.

On 5 May 2001, Ansar and 18 other army officers were charged in the death of 13 civilians who were killed by artillery shelling used during the 15 August 1975 Bangladesh coup d'état.

On 21 October 2004, a Dhaka court sentenced Ansar to life imprisonment for the killing of former Minister of Home Affairs Abul Hasnat Muhammad Qamaruzzaman, former Prime Minister Muhammad Mansur Ali, former Vice President Syed Nazrul Islam, and former Prime Minister Tajuddin Ahmed. The four national leaders were imprisoned after the assassination of Sheikh Mujibur Rahman in the 15 August 1975 Bangladesh coup d'état.

Ansar is currently living in Canada with the government of Bangladesh trying to extradite him.
