= Ahmed Sharful Hossain =

Bangladeshi officer and coup member

- Born: 19 January 1943 (age 83); Khulna, Presidency Division, British India
- Military career
- Allegiance: Pakistan (Before 1972); Bangladesh
- Branch: Pakistan Army; Bangladesh Army
- Service years: 1969–1986
- Rank: Major
- Unit: Armoured Corps
- Commands: Adjutant of Bengal Lancers
- Known for: Jail Killing
- Conflicts: 15 August 1975 Bangladeshi coup d'état

Ahmed Sharful Hossain, also known as Shariful Islam, (born 19 January 1943) is a Bangladesh Army officer and a fugitive involved in the assassination of Sheikh Mujibur Rahman in August 1975, and the related Jail Killing incident in November 1975.

== Career ==
Some mid-ranking officers in the Bangladesh Army launched a coup d'état on 15 August 1975 that resulted in the assassination of Sheikh Mujibur Rahman, the president of Bangladesh, and the formation of a government led by Khondaker Mostaq Ahmad. The coup was led by officers from the artillery and lancer units of Bangladeshs' Army. Ahmed Sharful Hossain was then a major in the lancer unit. He was part of the unofficial command council formed at the Gonobhaban (then the president's office) that ruled the country after the coup. He left Bangladesh along with other coup plotters on 4 November 1975 when a counter coup was launched. On 4 November 1975 national leaders AHM Qamaruzzaman, M Mansur Ali, Syed Nazrul Islam, and Tajuddin Ahmed were killed by the coup members before they left Bangladesh.

Hossain was appointed a diplomat by the new Bangladeshi government under President Ziaur Rahman. Hossain was posted to Senegal as the Bangladeshi counsellor. He also served in Bangladeshi Embassies in Saudi Arabia and Oman.

Hossain was an accused in the Jail Killing case filed on 4 November 1975 by Kazi Abdul Awal, the deputy inspector general of prisons. Investigation in the case did not start till 1996 when the Bangladesh Awami League returned to power led by Sheikh Hasina, the daughter of Sheikh Mujibur Rahman. On 15 October 1998 the case was brought to trial. In October 2004 Dhaka metropolitan sessions judge's court sentenced Hossain and 11 others to life imprisonment and 3 others to death. The Bangladesh High Court on 28 August 2008 upheld his sentence while acquitting six of the convicts. The Appellate Division upheld the verdict given by the trial court on 30 April 2014. The Bangladesh Supreme Court upheld the sentences of the lower court but excused AKM Mohiuddin Ahmed, Bazlul Huda, Syed Faruque Rahman, and Sultan Shahriar Rashid Khan. The four were executed after being sentenced to death for the assassination of Rahman, and the coup d'état. As of 18 January 2018 Hossain was still a fugitive.
