= The Assassin Next Door (The Fifth Estate) =

2023 documentary by CBC News

- The Fifth Estate episode
- Youtube thumbnail
- Episode no.: Season 49; Episode 4
- Written by: Mark Kelley
- Presented by: Mark Kelley
- Editing by: Ryan Ferguson
- Original air date: 17 November 2023
- Running time: 42 minutes

"The Assassin Next Door" is the fourth episode of 49th season of Canadian documentary series The Fifth Estate. The documentary was published by the Canada-state affiliated media CBC News. The investigative documentary episode is about Noor Chowdhury, the assassin of the first President of Bangladesh Sheikh Mujibur Rahman, and it focuses on questions that raises about Canada's silence in the case of Noor Chowdhury's staying in Canada.

== Background ==
The founding father and first president of Bangladesh Sheikh Mujibur Rahman and his family members were assassinated on 15 August 1975 in his residence of Dhanmondi 32 by a group of young Bangladesh Army personnel as part of a coup d'état. Minister of Commerce Khondaker Mostaq Ahmad immediately took control of the government and proclaimed himself president. The assassination marked the first direct military intervention in Bangladesh's civilian administration-centric politics. The trial of the assassins was ended on 8 November 1998 ordering the death sentence to fifteen out of the twenty accused of conspiring in the assassination. Many of them were executed and many of them were died of natural causes. Some person are absconding. Noor Chowdhury is one of them who is currently living in Canada.

== Description ==
The documentary reveals how one of the assassins Noor Chowdhury had fled to Canada now residing in a condo in Etobicoke west of Toronto. It explored the circumstances of the Noor Chowdhury case and included interviews with numerous prominent figures including Prime Minister Sheikh Hasina, the High Commissioner of Bangladesh in Canada Khalilur Rahman, and other individuals involved in the case. According to the documentary, Chowdhury is currently the most wanted criminal in Bangladesh. He was convicted in absentia and sentenced to death for assassinating the country's then president, Sheikh Mujibur Rahman, in 1975, and helping to plan the massacre of 21 members of the president's family and household, including his 10-year-old son. He was filmed tending to plants on his balcony but fled when confronted by the journalist outside his residence. The Government of Canada including Immigration, Refugees and Citizenship Canada (IRCC) refused to comment on the documentary about the case. Despite a deportation order issued by IRCC in 2006, Canada has been publicly silent on its reasons for allowing him to stay, driving a wedge between the two long-friendly countries. The documentary also shows the friendship between Bangladesh & Canada in the time when Sheikh Mujibur Rahman and Pierre Trudeau were in power.

== Cast ==
- Sheikh Hasina, Prime Minister of Bangladesh, daughter of Sheikh Mujibur Rahman.
- Anisul Huq, Minister for Law, Justice and Parliamentary Affairs, chief special prosecutor for the assassination of Sheikh Mujibur Rahman case.
- Stockwell Day, former Canadian Minister of Public Safety.
- Abdul Kahar Akond, former additional DIG of Bangladesh Police in the Criminal Investigation Department, investigation officer of the Assassination of Sheikh Mujibur Rahman.
- Rob Currie, Canadian international criminal law expert, professor of law at Dalhousie University.
- Abdur Rahman Chowdhury Rama, resident of Dhanmondi 32 as a young boy in 1975.
- Noor Chowdhury, former Lieutenant Colonel of Bangladesh Army, assassin of Sheikh Mujibur Rahman.
