= 15 August 1975 Bangladeshi coup d'état =

First military coup in Bangladesh

- Part of the Cold War and 1972–1975 Bangladesh insurgency
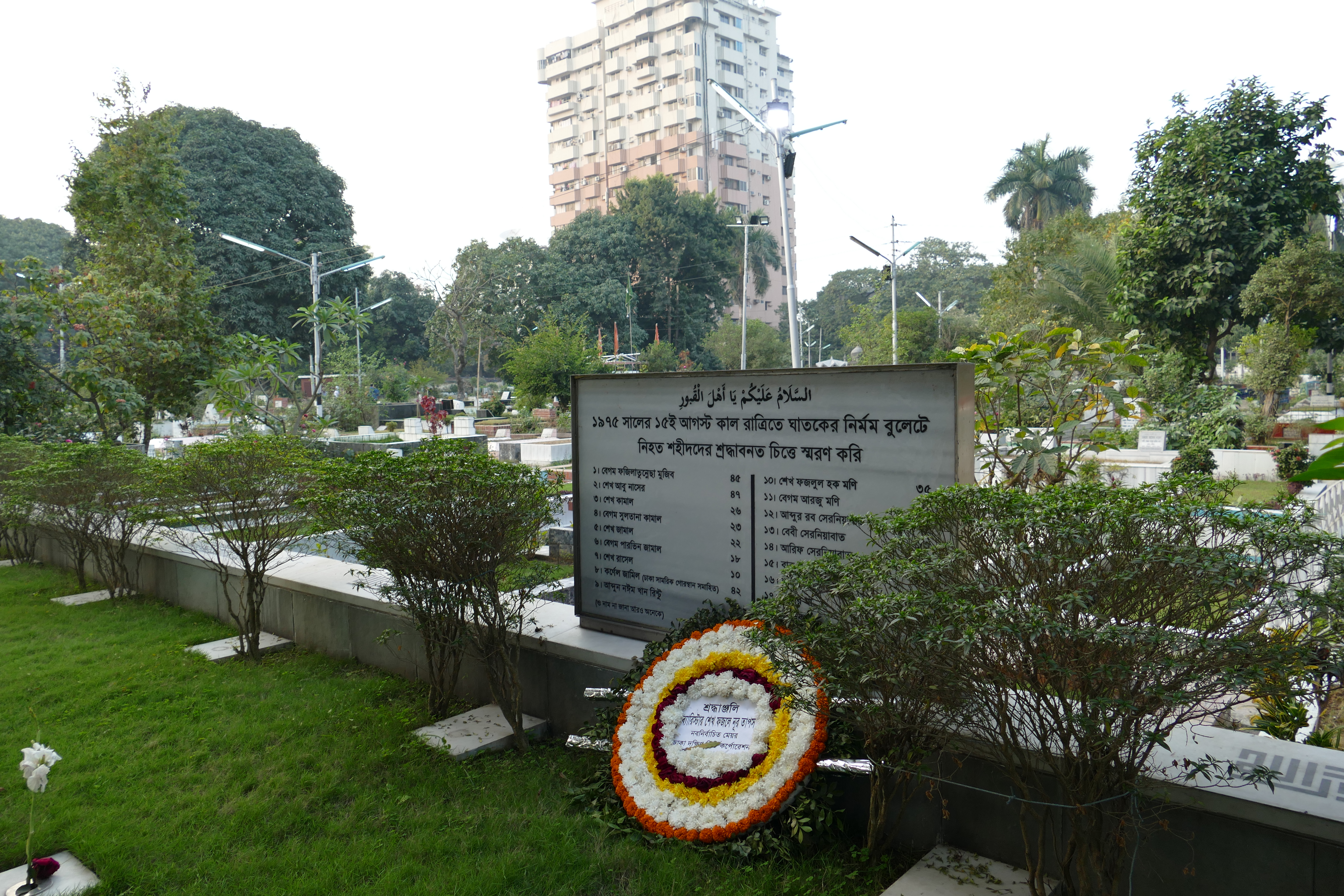
- Grave of the victims at Banani Graveyard, Dhaka
Date	15 August 1975; 51 years ago
Location	Dhaka, Bangladesh
Result	Assassination of Sheikh Mujibur Rahman and nationwide civil unrest; Mutineers overthrow socialist government, establishing military junta; Mutineers overthrown and exiled via Counter-coup; Anti-junta revolt by Kaderia army

Belligerents
Government of Bangladesh	Bangladesh Army (mutineers)

Commanders and leaders
(Provisional Government of Bangladesh) Sheikh Mujibur Rahman X Jamil Uddin Ahmed †; Kazi Mohammed Shafiullah; A. N. M. Nuruzzaman	(Bangladesh) Khondaker Mostaq Ahmad; Sayed Farooq-ur-Rahman (executed); Mohammad Bazlul Huda (executed); Shariful Haque Dalim (Note: Sentenced to death in absentia)

Units involved
Jatiya Rakkhi Bahini (Paramilitary); Bangladesh Police	1st Bengal Lancers; 2nd Field Artillery Regiment

Casualties and losses
Death(s): 47+ Injuries: 48+	Death(s): 3 Injuries: 1
- Trial Accused: 24; Capital punishment: 12

A military coup was launched in Bangladesh on 15 August 1975, by mid-ranking army officers in order to assassinate President Sheikh Mujibur Rahman. Sheikh Mujibur Rahman, also known as Bangabandhu (lit. 'Friend of Bengal') or Mujib, was the country's founding president, but post-independence his administration grew corrupt and reportedly 'increasingly authoritarian' until he formed a 'one-party state' led by the socialist Bangladesh Krishak Sramik Awami League. Mujib was killed during the coup, along with many of his family members who were living in Bangladesh at the time, but he was survived by his two then-expat daughters, one of whom was future prime minister Sheikh Hasina. The officers were led by Capt. Abdul Majed, Major Syed Faruque Rahman, Major Khandaker Abdur Rashid and Major Shariful Haque Dalim.

Khondaker Mostaq Ahmad, one of Mujib's close associates and cabinet ministers, took control of the government immediately following the coup with the support of the officers and declared himself President of Bangladesh. Under martial law, he made a proclamation on 20 August to amend the constitution to omit the provision for the legal basis for the one-party system. He reportedly praised the assassin officers, calling them "Children of the Sun", and proclaimed the Indemnity Ordinance, which granted them immunity from prosecution. They were all later toppled by a counter-coup on 3 November 1975.

== Background ==
The All-Pakistan Awami League won the 1970 Pakistani general election, but Sheikh Mujibur Rahman, the party's leader, was denied by the Pakistani government the position of the prime minister of Pakistan; this was a result of long-time vocal opposition between Bengali citizens of Pakistan and the West Pakistan-based Establishment. As the democratic demands and protests continued, Sheikh Mujibur Rahman delivered a speech on 7 March that brought the Bengalis together to become prepared for a war of independence. On 25 March 1971, as part of Operation Searchlight, the Pakistan Army launched an armed operation killing intellectuals in Dhaka University; the following day, high-level East Pakistani officials declared Bangladesh's independence from Pakistan, triggering the 9-month 1971 war that ended with the surrender of Pakistani Forces in Bangladesh to an allied force of Bangladesh Mukti Bahini and Indian Armed Forces. In 1973, Sheikh Mujibur's Bangladesh Awami League won the first parliamentary election in independent Bangladesh by a landslide, but accusations of rigging grew.

In 1973, Shariful Haque Dalim and his wife were involved in a scuffle with the sons of Gazi Golam Mostafa, a leader of the Awami League, at a function at the Dhaka Ladies Club. In retaliation, some officers and soldiers of the Lancer unit and 2 Field Artillery Regiment of the Bangladesh Army attacked Golam Mostofa's residence. As a result, Major Dalim, Major S.H.M.B Noor Chowdhury, and other officers were charged with breach of discipline. Major Dalim had sought help from President Sheikh Mujib but was refused. Major Sultan Shahriar Rashid Khan resigned from the army over the incident. Major Dalim and Major Noor were among the officers who lost their commissions over the charges of indiscipline.

In 1974, Sayed Farooq had become dissatisfied with the Awami League government. He would often discuss his dissatisfaction with Major General Ziaur Rahman who was the deputy chief of army staff. Ziaur Rahman had suggested that Faruque should "do something" about the situation in one such meeting.

Abdur Rashid was able to communicate with Commerce Minister Khandaker Moshtaque Ahmed about the situation in the country. Rashid, Dalim, and Moshtaque decided that they must dissolve the one-party system, BAKSAL and remove Sheikh Mujib from power. Rashid informed Faruque, who agreed with the plan, and he was also told that Major General Zia would support them.

== Execution of the coup ==
=== Cantonment ===
On 15 August 1975, President Sheikh Mujibur Rahman was scheduled to attend the convocation ceremony of Dhaka University in the morning. Before the day on 14 August there was bomb attack in Dhaka University which was suspected to be an attack by the JSD. That night, the president's eldest son Sheikh Kamal and the security forces were busy securing the university campus. On the same day, an Indian military helicopter was reported crashed near Noakhali after hitting a bird, killing the pilot and some of the passengers. Although tension prevailed in various parts of Dhaka city, the situation in Dhaka Cantonment was observed to be normal.

As the evening of 14 August approached, the vehicles of the army's 2nd Field Regiment were mobilized. Under the guise of regular night training, 105mm howitzers were towed from a unit south of Dhaka Cantonment to the under-construction Hazrat Shahjalal International Airport in Kurmitola. Around 10:00 PM, T-54 tanks of the Bengal Lancers emerged from the northern end of the cantonment, eventually concentrating 18 cannons and 28 tanks at the airport. At 11:30 PM, the participating officers gathered, and in the early hours of 15 August, Major Syed Farooq Rahman, who was in charge of the operation, briefed them on the tactical plan at the squadron office near the airport. The rebels were divided into four groups, with the primary target being the residence of Bangabandhu Sheikh Mujibur Rahman at Dhanmondi Road 32. The plan involved two perimeters: an inner circle to launch the direct assault and an outer circle to intercept any reinforcements from the Rakkhi Bahini or the army. Major Noor and Major Huda were assigned the outer circle, tasked with setting up roadblocks at Dhanmondi Road 27, Sobhanbagh Mosque, and the Road 32 bridge. Simultaneous attacks were also planned for the homes of Sheikh Fazlul Huq Mani and Abdur Rab Serniabat. Although Major Farooq requested Major Dalim to be present during the attack on the President's house, Dalim took charge of the assault on Serniabat's residence instead, citing "prior relations," and set off with a platoon of soldiers in a truck and a high-speed jeep fitted with a heavy machine gun. Risaldar Moslemuddin Khan was assigned two platoons to attack Sheikh Mani's house, while Major Shahriar led a company to secure the radio station, Dhaka university, and New Market areas, with the additional task of neutralizing any potential resistance from the BDR at Pilkhana. Major Farooq personally led 28 tanks to Sher-e-Bangla Nagar to intercept the Rakkhi Bahini; while these tanks were loaded with machine gun bullets, they carried no shells. For the direct assault on the President's house, 350 soldiers in 12 trucks were placed under the command of Major A.K.M. Mohiuddin Ahmed. Major Rashid had no role in the direct attack but was tasked with coordinating the political situation and post-operation management. He oversaw 18 cannons, loaded and aimed at the Rakkhi Bahini headquarters and the President's residence. After the briefing, the groups departed the airport at 4:00 AM. The residences of Abdur Rab Serniabat and Sheikh Mani were attacked at 5:15 AM, followed by the assault on the President's residence at 5:30 AM.

A coup was going to happen at midnight. Former DGFI chief Brigadier Rauf was the first to get such a hint through sources around 2 to 3 AM. but reportedly remained inactive. The army chief K. M. Shafiullah claimed, fearing the unknown, Brigadier Rauf immediately left his home and took safe shelter with his family behind the house under a tree who came out in the morning and narrated various unrelated 'stories' to cover up his failure making statements in the newspapers. The head of military intelligence, Lieutenant Colonel Salauddin, received news of the movement of soldiers and tanks between 4:30 AM and 5 AM. Then he rushed to the house of Army Chief Shafiullah and informed him of the situation. Army Chief Shafiullah kept calling the President, but could not get through. Then he kept calling everywhere. The Army Chief got Brigade Commander Shafaat Jamil on the phone at 5:30 AM. He ordered Shafaat to move the 1st Bengal and 4th Bengal Regiments to resist the mutineers, but Shafaat Jamil remained inactive claiming that the army chief did not give him any order. Then the Army chief also spoke to DGFI chief Jamil Uddin Ahmed on the phone. The DGFI chief rushed to the spot after receiving the President's call and was killed by the mutineers. The army chief got the president on the phone at around 5:50 AM. The President informed him that his house was under attack. It was around 5:55 AM. After that, there was no response on his phone. Shafiullah heard gunshots on the phone and the connection was lost soon after. Then Shafiullah called Deputy Army Chief Ziaur Rahman and Brigadier Khaled Mosharraf and asked them to come to his house. He also called the Air Chief, the Naval Chief and the station commander of Dhaka Cantonment Colonel Hamid. Then he rushed to the office. But in the end failed to mount any effective resistance against the rebels. The President was killed at around 6 am.

=== Bangabandhu House ===
The operation at the personal residence of President Sheikh Mujibur Rahman was led by Major A. K. M. Mohiuddin Ahmed. Major Bazlul Huda was placed in the team as he was the adjutant to the 2nd Field Regiment of Artillery, which was guarding the home of the President. The team also included Major S.H.M.B Noor Chowdhury. Captain Abul Bashar, who was in charge of the guards, had served under Major Dalim.

Before the attack on his residence at Dhanmondi 32, Sheikh Mujibur Rahman received news of the assault on the home of his relative and cabinet member, Abdur Rab Serniabat. House staff members Md. Selim (Abdul) and Abdur Rahman Sheikh (Roma) were sleeping on the balcony outside the room where Mujib was staying. From his second-floor room, Mujib telephoned his personal assistant, AFM Mohitul Islam, who was on the ground floor, and instructed, "Miscreants have attacked Serniabat's residence. Call the police control room immediately." After failing to get a response from the police control room, Mohitul attempted to contact the exchange at Ganabhaban (the then President's office). At approximately 5:30 AM, just as the guards at the residence began hoisting the national flag to the sound of a bugle, a direct attack on the house commenced from the south. Some of the guards were killed defending the residence after the mutineers tried to force their way in.

The police on duty also started firing back. Shortly after, Mujib opened the door of his room and stepped out onto the balcony. Household staff members Abdul and Roma woke up at that time. Following the instructions of Sheikh Fazilatunnesa Mujib, Roma went downstairs and looked outside the main gate, where he observed members of the army advancing toward the residence while firing. Returning inside, Roma saw Mujib descending to the ground floor dressed in a lungi and an undershirt. Upon reaching the second floor, he found Begum Mujib running about in a state of panic. Roma then went to the third floor and woke up Mujib's eldest son, Sheikh Kamal, and his wife, Sultana Kamal. After hearing the news, Sheikh Kamal went down to the ground floor, while Sultana Kamal stayed on the second floor. Roma also woke up Sheikh Jamal and his wife on the second floor. Jamal took his wife to Fazilatunnesa Mujib's room on the second floor. Sheikh Mujib came down in the middle of the gunfire and started talking to the police on duty. Everyone assumed that these were sneak attacks by the JSD and the PBSP. Amidst the gunfire, Mohitul continued to make phone calls to various places from the office in the presence of Mujib. During the attempts to reach the police control room and the Ganabhaban exchange, Mujib took the receiver himself and said, "This is President Sheikh Mujib speaking..." At that moment, a volley of bullets shattered the window glass and struck the office walls. A fragment of the glass injured Mohitul's right elbow. The firing through that window continued unabated. Mujib lay down on the floor beside the table and pulled Mohitul down to safety. Meanwhile, Fazilatunnesa Mujib sent Mujib's kurta and spectacles through the household staff, Abdul. When the firing subsided momentarily, Mujib stood up and put on the kurta and glasses brought by Abdul. Stepping out from that ground-floor room onto the balcony, Mujib questioned the army and police personnel on guard, "So much firing is going on, what are you doing?" After saying this, Mujib headed upstairs. According to the police on duty, Bangabandhu thought that maybe the army men had come to help him this time. So, thinking that he would be 'same raid', he ordered the police to stop firing, and then went upstairs. When the police stopped firing on the order of the President, the attackers easily entered the residence. The guards surrendered after a brief firefight and were lined up outside the house.

Before he could reach the upper floor, Sheikh Kamal came down and stood on the balcony, saying, "Army and police brothers, come with me." Mohitul Islam and Divisional Superintendent of Police (DSP) Nurul Islam Khan stood behind Sheikh Kamal. At that moment, Major Noor, Mohiuddin Ahmed (Lancer), and Captain Bazlul Huda entered the house gate with their soldiers, shouting "Hands up." Nurul Islam Khan pulled Mohitul inside the room. Without saying a word, Bazlul Huda shot Sheikh Kamal in the leg. To save himself, Kamal jumped into the room. He told Mohitul, "I am Sheikh Mujib's son, Sheikh Kamal. Tell them." Mohitul informed the attackers, "He is Sheikh Mujib's son, Sheikh Kamal." Immediately upon hearing this, Bazlul Huda opened brushfire on Kamal with his sten, resulting in his death. During this, one bullet hit Mohitul's knee and another hit Nurul Islam's leg. In that condition, Nurul Islam dragged Mohitul into his room, where they saw a member of the Special Branch (SB) standing and trembling in fear, with his weapon lying at his feet. Moments later, Bazlul Huda entered the room and ordered everyone to go outside and line up.

Sensing something of what was happening below, Mujib locked the door of his second-floor room and began making phone calls to various places. At one point, he reached his Military Secretary, Colonel Jamil Uddin Ahmad, and told him, "Jamil, come quickly. Army men have attacked my residence. Tell Shafiullah to send forces." Mujib also called the then Army Chief, General Shafiullah, saying, "Shafiullah, your forces have attacked my house, Kamal seems to have been killed. Send forces immediately." Shafiullah replied, "I am doing something. Can you get out of the house?" After receiving the call, Colonel Jamil set out for Mujib's residence in his personal red car with his driver, Ayenuddin Molla. However, he was shot and killed near the Sobhanbagh mosque; the driver escaped. On the house compound, Mohitul, Nurul Islam, Abdul Matin, the SB member, and others were lined up. One of the attackers shot and killed the SB member. The attackers then moved upstairs while firing. They shot household staff Abdul, who had taken refuge in the washroom of Sheikh Jamal's room. Shot in the hand and stomach, he sat leaning against the wall near the stairs. Besides Mujib, his wife Fazilatunnesa Mujib, sons Sheikh Jamal and Sheikh Russell, and daughters-in-law Sultana Kamal and Parveen Jamal Rosey were inside Mujib's room. The attackers took positions outside the room. When the firing stopped, Mujib opened the door and stepped onto the balcony, where the attackers surrounded him. Major Mohiuddin and his soldiers began leading Mujib downstairs. Mujib asked them, "What do you want? Where are you taking me?" Mohiuddin faltered. Mujib asked again, "Where are you taking me, what will you do—why are you being disrespectful?" At that point, Bazlul Huda and Nur took positions on the landing between the ground and second floors. As Mujib was being brought down, Nur said something, prompting Mohiuddin to step aside. Immediately, Sheikh Mujibur Rahman was fired upon with a sten gun from below. Eighteen bullets struck his chest and stomach. Roma followed behind Mujib, the attackers ordered him back into the room. Meanwhile, Mujib's younger brother, Sheikh Abu Naser, who had bullet wounds on his hand, entered the room of Sheikh Rehana (who was abroad).

Roma informed Sheikh Fazilatunnesa Mujib that Mujib had been shot. At this, Fazilatunnesa Mujib, Sheikh Jamal, Sheikh Russel, Sultana Kamal, Rosey Jamal, Sheikh Naser, and Rama took refuge in the room's washroom. After assassinating Mujib, the attackers went downstairs and left the house. Shortly after, Major Aziz Pasha and Risaldar Mosleuddin entered the house with their troops. Aziz Pasha went to the second floor and began banging on the door of Mujib's room, eventually firing at it. Fazilatunnesa Mujib then opened the door and pleaded with them not to kill those inside. The attackers began leading Fazilatunnesa Mujib, Sheikh Russell, Sheikh Naser, and Rama downstairs. Seeing Mujib's body on the stairs, his wife broke down in tears and cried out, "I will not go, kill me here." When she refused to go down, the assassins took Sheikh Russell, Sheikh Naser, and Roma downstairs, while returning Fazilatunnesa Mujib to the room. Sheikh Jamal, Sultana Kamal, and Rosey Jamal were already in that room. Aziz Pasha and Risaldar Mosleuddin then killed everyone in the room, including Fazilatunnesa Mujib, with indiscriminate firing. Rosey Jamal was shot in the face. Sheikh Naser, Sheikh Russell, and Roma were then lined up with others on the compound. Sheikh Naser told the attackers, "I don't do politics. I earn my living through some business." An attacker replied, "Fine. We won't say anything to you. Go sit in that room." He was then taken to the washroom adjacent to the office and shot. As the dying Sheikh Naser groaned, "Water, water" he was fired upon once more. Standing in the line, the child Sheikh Russell first hugged Roma and then Mohitul Islam, asking, "Brother, will they kill me?" Mohitul replied, "No brother, you won't be killed." When Russell wanted to go to his mother, Aziz Pasha forcibly took him from Mohitul and ordered him to be taken to the second floor. Following Aziz Pasha's orders, a Havildar took Sheikh Russell to the second floor and shot him dead. Major Faruque promoted Captain Huda to major on the spot. Faruque had arrived and left on a tank.

=== Sheikh Fazlul Haque Mani residence ===
Sheikh Fazlul Haque Mani was the nephew of Sheikh Mujibur Rahman and viewed as a likely successor. He was killed in his home along with his wife, Begum Arzu Moni, who was believed to be pregnant at the time. His sons Sheikh Fazle Noor Taposh and Sheikh Fazle Shams Parash survived. His home on Road 13/1 in Dhanmondi was surrounded by 20-25 army personnel on 15 August 1975.

=== Abdur Rab Serniabat residence ===
Abdur Rab Serniabat, a former minister of water resources and brother-in-law of Sheikh Mujibur Rahman, was killed in his home in Mintoo road, Dhaka. His home was attacked by a team that was led by Major Aziz Pasha, Captain Majed, Major Shahriar Rashid, and Captain Nurul Huda. Serniabat's nephew Shahid Serniabat, daughter Baby Serniabat, grandson Sukanto Abdullah Babu, and son Arif Serniabat were also killed in the attack. Three domestic servants were also killed in the attack. His son, Abul Hasnat Abdullah, survived the attack and nine other people were injured in the household.

=== Artillery support ===
At Dhanmondi, an artillery group under Colonel Mohiuddin Ahmed took up a position with a M101 howitzer on the lake shore south of Mujib's residence. The mortar shells fired from there towards the residence, missed its target and hit Mohammadpur (to the north of Dhanmondi). At this, house number 8 and 9 of Shershah Suri Road and house number 196 and 197 of Shahjahan Road (tinshed slum) caught fire instantly killing 14 and leaving 40 people injured.

=== Rakkhi Bahini camp ===
Under the leadership of Farook, 28 tanks entered the cantonment through the Military Police checkpost at Banani on Airport Road. By then, the call to prayer (Fajr Adhan) had begun. Farook took his tank through the lines of the 46th Brigade unit, following a bypass road to reach the main road of the cantonment. He entered Tejgaon Airport through a gate opposite the Air Force helipad in Dhaka Cantonment. While two tanks followed Farook, the remaining tanks lost their way and proceeded toward Farmgate via Jahangir Gate. Farook then broke through the western wall of the airport and positioned himself in front of the National Rakkhi Bahini headquarters. The Rakkhi Bahini surrendered without incident, Faruque moved towards the residence of Sheikh Mujibur Rahman after the neutralization of the Rakkhi Bahini was completed.

==== Savar ====
The fourth and most powerful group was sent towards Savar to repel the expected counter-attack by the security forces stationed there. After a brief fight and the loss of eleven men, the security forces surrendered.

=== Bangladesh Betar ===
The main office of Bangladesh Betar (radio) in Dhaka was attacked by the mutineers early in the morning. They quickly disarmed the police stationed there and took control of the radio. Major Dalim and Major Shahriar were in charge of the operation at the radio station. They controlled the flow of information from there.

== Aftermath, counter coup and revolt ==
Curfew was imposed after Mujib's death was announced on Bangladesh Radio nationwide. Protests were held in several places including Barguna, Kishoreganj, Bhairab, Khulna, Jessore, Faridganj in Chandpur, Mohanganj in Netrakona, and Gafargaon in Mymensingh. During this time, film actor Khasru, also the guerrilla commander of the Dhaka region during the Bangladesh Liberation War, was shot wounded. Khandaker Mostaq Ahmad addressed the nation from the radio station. His speech, written by Taheruddin Thakur, announced the formation of a new government led by him. Following him, the Chief of the army, his deputy, the chief of naval staff, the chief of the air force, the police chief and Bangladesh Rifles pledged their allegiance to the new government. Khandaker Moshtaque appointed General M. A. G. Osmani as his defence adviser. General Ziaur Rahman was made the chief of army staff on 24 August 1975 and Khalilur Rahman was made the first Chief of Defence Staff of Bangladesh Army.

On 26 September 1975, Khandaker Moshtaque proclaimed the Indemnity Ordinance which protected those involved in the coup legal protection. On 5 October 1975, the Jatiya Rakkhi Bahini (Absorption in the Army) Ordinance was passed with strong support from Ziaur Rahman; which absorbed the Rakkhi Bahini into the Bangladesh Army.

=== Counter-coup ===
On 3 November 1975, the situation had grown tense with some officers of the Bangladesh Army led by Brigadier General Khaled Mosharraf and Colonel Shafaat Jamil launching a coup to remove the mutineers and restore order to the Army. Justice Abu Sadat Mohammad Sayem replaced Khandaker Moshtaque as president and Mosharraf was made the chief of army staff. The mutineers in the morning had killed former president Syed Nazrul Islam, former prime minister Tajuddin Ahmed and ministers M Mansur Ali and AHM Qamruzzaman in Dhaka Central Jail where they were locked up since the mutiny on 15 August. Zia was placed under house arrest. On 4 November the mutineers were provided safe passage to Bangkok.

On 7 November 1975, Khaled Mosharraf was killed in another coup that restored Ziaur Rahman to the chief of army staff. The coup was led by the revolutionary soldier's organisation and Colonel Abu Taher. Taher himself was executed for the killing of Khaled under the government formed by Major General Zia on 21 July 1976, in order to restore discipline in the Army and prevent any further coups.

=== Revolt ===
Abdul Kader Siddique divided 17,000 soldiers into 7 fronts and rebelled against the military junta for 22 months. Amidst this, the rebellion and struggle of 500 youths from Sherpur Sadar, Sreebardi, Jhenaigati, and Nakla Upazilas, known as the '500 Protesters of Sherpur', was a widely discussed topic.

Arms collection began with surprise attacks on the Police and BDR during the rebellion. At this time, news of arrests started coming from various parts of the country. The rebels captured a portion of the border areas of Mymensingh, Sherpur, and Netrokona districts. The rebels took control of 5 BDR camps and 2 police stations in the border areas. A headquarters was established at Chandubhui, a rugged hilly region surrounded by dense forests inside the Meghalaya border. Kader Siddique served as the Supreme Commander. The Chief Financial Executive was Garo indigenous Chitta Ranjan Sangma. The Chief Recruitment Officer was Abdul Haq, a native of Kamarkhali. At the same time, a sector headquarters for the rebels was established at Bhabanipur in Durgapur Thana of Netrokona district. Salim Talukdar of Tangail was responsible as the Sector GOC, and Prashanta Kumar Sarkar was the Second-in-Command. The Quarter Guard Captain was Shariful Islam Khan, and the Defense Commander was Saidur Rahman. Several sub-sectors were established inside Bangladesh under this headquarters.

On 19 January 1976, when rebels attacked Durgapur Thana, the OC of the Thana, Tofail, along with 8 policemen, fled with bullet wounds. On 23 January, after attacking and taking control of Kalmakanda Thana, police officer Ashraf Ali and his wife Sultana Ashraf were detained and taken away. On 20 January, under the leadership of Rangra's Sector Commander Jitendra Bhowmik, rebels attacked Baromari and Farangpara BDR camps and took control of the two camps. Rebels took possession of a 300-square-mile area in the northern part of the Kangsha River. At this time, multiple face-to-face clashes occurred between the rebels and the army. On 18 August 1976, 5 freedom fighters of Muktagacha—Jabed Ali, Nikhil Dutta, Subodh Dhar, Dipal Das, and Mofiz Uddin—were killed in an army operation. A surviving teenage fighter named Bishwajit Nandi was detained and sentenced to death by a military court on 18 May 1977. Due to the influence of influential world leaders, including Indira Gandhi, he was given life imprisonment and was released in 1989. The rebellion started in November 1975 and lasted until July 1977. In this, between 104 and over 400 were killed according to varying opinions, and hundreds were injured. The rebels surrendered their arms following the military government's general amnesty declaration and promise of rehabilitation. However, allegations were found that many of the rebels fell victim to enforced disappearances. The last group of rebels laid down their arms in April 1978.

In 1976, the military government of Bangladesh provided the coup plotters with diplomatic jobs. A. K. M. Mohiuddin Ahmed was made the second secretary of the embassy in Algeria, Rashed Chowdhury was made the consulate general in Jeddah in Saudi Arabia, S. H. M. B. Noor Chowdhury was made the second secretary in the embassy in Tehran, Shariful Haque Dalim was made the first secretary to the embassy in Beijing, and Abdul Aziz Pasha was made the first secretary to the embassy in Buenos Aires, Argentina. They held the positions until 1996, when the Bangladesh Awami League formed the government and recalled them to Bangladesh. They refused to comply and as a result were fired from their positions.

== Trial and executions ==
The Bangladesh Nationalist Party returned to power in 2001 and reinstated the officers who had been dismissed in 1996 to their diplomatic positions.

Colonel Farooq, Colonel Sultan Shahriar Rashid Khan, and former state minister Taheruddin Thakur were arrested on 14 August 1996, the same year Bangladesh Awami League returned to power. Three months later, the indemnity act was removed and the trial began.

AFM Mohitul Islam, personal assistant to President Sheikh Mujib, filed a charge against the mutineers with Dhanmondi Police Station on 2 October 1996. The Criminal Investigation Department started investigating the case the next day. The CID pressed charges against 20 people on 15 January 1997.

On 12 March 1997, the trial started with six accused in jail and 14 being outside the country. Zobaida Rashid, wife of Khandaker Abdur Rashid, was relieved of charges after she filed a number of appeals, reducing the accused to 19. Other cases filed with the High Court challenged the legality of the trial court and its location, the cancellation of the indemnity act, which delayed the trial. Major Huda was bought from Thailand in 1998, through the signing of an extradition treaty between Thailand and Bangladesh. Dhaka district Justice Kazi Golam Rasul, sentenced 15 accused to death on 8 November 1998. Appeals were filled with Bangladesh High Court. On 14 November 1998 the High Court delivered a split verdict with Justice Md Ruhul Amin upholding the death penalty of 10 of the convicts, Justice ABM Khairul Haque upholding the death penalty of all 15. The case was referred to a third Justice, Mohammad Fazlul Karim, who broke the tie by sentencing 12 of the accused to death.

Then Chief Justice Ruhul Amin constituted an appeal court with five justices: Justice Surendra Kumar Sinha, Justice Md Abdul Aziz, Justice Md Tafazzul Islam, Justice BK Das, and Justice Md Muzammel Hossain. The verdict of the Appellate Division confirmed the death sentences of the 12 convicts on 19 November 2009. Three sought presidential pardons but were refused. On 27 January 2010, Bangladesh Supreme Court refused the convicts application for review. On 28 January 2010, five of the convicts in custody were executed. The hanged were Sultan Shahriar Rashid Khan, AKM Mohiuddin Ahmed, Mohiuddin Ahmed, Sayed Farooq-ur-Rahman, Bazlul Huda.

On the 7 April 2020, Captain Abdul Majed who was hiding in Kolkata, India, was arrested at Mirpur by the Counter Terrorism and Transnational Crime unit of the Dhaka Metropolitan Police. He was sent to Dhaka Central Jail, Keraniganj, and was executed by hanging a few days later on the 12 April 2020.

== Legacy ==
Lawrence Lifschultz characterized this incident as an outcome of the Cold War between the United States-influenced Pakistan and the Soviet Union-influenced India.

According to Colonel Hamid, The total surprise, suddenness and scale of the attack left all the forces, including the National Defence Force, the police, the BDR, and other forces stunned and terrified thinking it to be a coup by the army. Thus, no one refrained from taking any immediate action without observing the situation well. On the other hand, the army chief failed to take a quick decision. He wasted valuable time on unnecessary telephone calls and conversations at the critical moment. But could not move a single soldier from the cantonment to rescue the president. Moreover, the insecurity of the President's residence and the failure of intelligence were largely responsible for the death of President Sheikh Mujib. The radio announcement of Mujib's assassination created terrible psychological pressure in Dhaka and all over the country. Everyone was confused by this. The announcement was also made in the name of the army. Which was a big 'bluff'. The participating soldiers followed the orders of their officers, unaware of the coup.

Colonel Hamid wrote,

The opportunity created by his death and the disappearance of a political leader of such immense stature marked the onset of military politics in the country's political arena. The illegal tendency of ambitious military officers to frequently seize state power created instability and anarchy within the political landscape. Yet, none of those within the military who breached discipline and engaged in the irregular pursuit of power while in uniform faced an impartial trial or court-martial; instead, they were rewarded and benefited in various ways. President Sheikh Mujib had begun taking stern measures against these ambitious and undisciplined officers, but for this, he had to pay the ultimate price with his life.

Since 1975, Bangladesh had been under different military governments, with democracy being partially restored a few times and permanently in 1990.

Sheikh Hasina and Sheikh Rehana, the two daughters of Sheikh Mujibur Rahman, survived the assassinations of their family as they were in West Germany in August 1975. Sheikh Hasina was subsequently elected five times Prime Minister of Bangladesh, in 1996, 2009, 2014, 2018, and January 2024. Her regime ended in self-imposed exile following a series of violent protests in 2024.

== See also ==
- Military coups in Bangladesh
