= S. H. M. B. Noor Chowdhury =

Bangladeshi retired army officer

- এস.এইচ.এম.বী. নূর চৌধুরী
- Born: 10 October 1946 (age 80); Sylhet, Assam Province, British India
- Education: Pakistan Military Academy
- Military career
- Allegiance: Pakistan (Before 1971); Bangladesh
- Branch: Pakistan Army; Bangladesh Army
- Service years: 1967–1996
- Rank: Lieutenant Colonel
- Unit: Armoured Corps
- Commands: Deputy Commander of S Force; Company Commander of Bengal Lancers; GSO-1 of 9th Infantry Division
- Known for: Assassination of Sheikh Mujibur Rahman
- Awards: Bir Bikrom (Revoked)

S. H. M. B. Noor Chowdhury is a retired army officer of Bangladesh Army who was convicted for his part in the 15 August 1975 Bangladeshi coup d'état.

== Career ==
In 1974, Noor was a major of the Bangladesh Army in the First Bengal Lancer unit. A major of the Lancers, Shariful Haque Dalim, had gotten into a scuffle with the sons of Bangladesh Awami League leader Gazi Golam Mostafa. Officers from the Lancer then ransacked the house of Mostafa. This resulted in those officers including Dalim and Noor losing their commission in the army. In May or June 1975 Noor and other officers met with Khondakar Mushtaque to talk about a plot to remove Sheikh Mujib from power. The officers wished to remove the government of Sheikh Mujib and replace that under the leadership of Khondakar Mushtaque.

On 14 August 1975, the army officers met to finalize their plans for the next day. Noor was placed in the team that was to attack the residence of Sheikh Mujib. Noor along with Major Mohammad Bazlul Huda shot and killed Sheikh Mujib while he was coming down the stairs.

The attack on 15 August 1975 killed Mujib and most of his family members. After the coup, Noor was posted to the Bangladeshi embassy in Tehran as the second secretary. In 1996 when a Bangladesh Awami League government was voted to power, Noor was recalled to Bangladesh. He refused to comply with the government order and lost his job as a result.

Chowdhury and his wife visited Canada in 1996. They overstayed their visas, and in 1997 Chowdhury filed a refugee claim.

On 3 November 1975 former acting President Syed Nazrul Islam, former Prime Minister Tajuddin Ahmad, former Finance Minister Muhammad Mansur Ali, and former Minister of Home Affairs Abul Hasnat Muhammad Qamaruzzaman were killed by the mutinous officers in Dhaka Central Jail.

== Trial ==
The Metropolitan Sessions Judge's Court of Dhaka had sentenced him to life imprisonment for the murder of four national leaders of Bangladesh in the 1975 Jail killing case and 11 other defendants were sentenced to life imprisonment; three to death. On 28 August the Bangladesh High court confirmed his life sentence. The Supreme Court of Bangladesh called the jail killing a Criminal conspiracy after confirming the sentences of the accused on 1 December 2015. Majors present in Bangabhaban has asked the jailer at Dhaka Jail to provide the assassins with access to the four leaders.

=== Extradition ===
The Canadian government has refused to extradite Noor as Noor has been sentenced to death in Bangladesh. The Canadian government has shown willingness to resolve the issue with Bangladesh through discussions. Canada has reportedly not approved his application for political asylum. Noor has proclaimed his innocence in an interview on the Canadian Broadcasting Corporation.

After the death of Hardeep Singh Nijjar, Bangladeshi foreign minister AK Abdul Momen expressed grievances against Canada's extradition policies as related to Noor.

== CBC coverage ==
On November 17, 2023, the CBC program The Fifth Estate aired an episode titled The Assassin Next Door. The episode explored the circumstances of the Noor Chowdhury case and included interviews with numerous prominent figures including Prime Minister Sheikh Hasina, the High Commissioner of Bangladesh in Canada Dr. Khalilur Rahman, and other individuals involved in the case.

Chowdhury was said to be living in a condo in Etobicoke and was filmed tending to plants on his balcony but fled when confronted by journalist Mark Kelley outside his residence. The Canadian government including Immigration, Refugees and Citizenship Canada (IRCC) refused to comment on the case.

== See also ==
- Assassination of Sheikh Mujibur Rahman
