= Mohamed Khairuzzaman =

Bangladeshi officer and diplomat

- মোহাম্মদ খায়রুজ্জামান

Ambassador of Bangladesh to Myanmar
- In office 5 September 2005 – 20 August 2007
- Preceded by: Abdul B. Manjoor Rahim
- Succeeded by: Abu Roshde Rokonuddawla

Personal details
- Spouse: Rieta Rahman
- Children: 2

Military service
- Allegiance: Pakistan (before 1972); Bangladesh
- Branch/service: Pakistan Army; Bangladesh Army
- Years of service: 1969-1997
- Rank: Major
- Unit: East Bengal Regiment
- Commands: 2IC of 4th East Bengal Regiment

Mohamed Khairuzzaman is a retired Bangladesh Army officer and former diplomat who served as Bangladesh's ambassador to Malaysia and Myanmar.

== Career ==
Khairuzzaman served in the Bangladesh Army, retiring with the rank of major. He was placed in the foreign service after the assassination of Sheikh Mujib. He was the ambassador of Bangladesh to the Philippines in 1996 when he was recalled by the Bangladesh Awami League government when he was named as an accused in the case over the Jail Killing in 1975 of Syed Nazrul Islam, Tajuddin Ahmad, Muhammad Mansur Ali, and Abul Hasnat Muhammad Qamaruzzaman. He was arrested when he returned to Bangladesh.

In 2001, he was in jail charged with involvement in the assassination of Sheikh Mujibur Rahman, the first president of Bangladesh. He was released when the Bangladesh Nationalist Party and Bangladesh Jamaat-e-Islami government came to power. He was given the rank of additional secretary in the foreign ministry. He was made the ambassador to Malaysia. In 2004, he was acquitted of the Jail Killing by a lower court in Bangladesh.

When the Bangladesh Awami League came to power in 2009, they recalled him. He asked for leave, but that was turned down by the government. The government of Bangladesh appointed AKM Atiqur Rahman to replace him as the ambassador. He has since refused to return to Bangladesh and has applied to stay in Malaysia under the "Malaysia My Second Home" program. He was arrested by Malaysian immigration police on 9 February 2022 from his residence in the Ampang area of Kuala Lumpur. Malaysian authorities said that it was due to an offence committed and following a request by his home country, Bangladesh. On 16 February 2022, he was released by the Malaysian government.

== Personal life ==
Khairuzzaman is married to Rieta Rahman, a daughter of former senior minister (with the rank of prime minister) Mashiur Rahman, who is a journalist and politician. They have 2 sons, Rehmanuzzaman and Aayihim R. Zaman.
