= Mohammad Kismat Hashem =

Bangladeshi officer and coup member (1950–2015)

- Born: 17 February 1950; Chittagong, East Bengal, Pakistan
- Died: 26 March 2015 (aged 65); Montreal, Quebec, Canada
- Military career
- Allegiance: Bangladesh; Pakistan (Before 1971)
- Branch: Bangladesh Army; Pakistan Army
- Service years: 1968–1975
- Rank: Captain
- Unit: Regiment of Artillery
- Commands: Sub-Commander of Sector – XI
- Known for: Jail Killing

Mohammad Kismat Hashem (17 February 1950 – 26 March 2015) was a Bangladesh Army officer who was convicted for his role in the 1975 Jail Killing of four senior Awami League leaders following the assassination of Sheikh Mujibur Rahman, the president of Bangladesh.

== Career ==
A few Bangladesh Army officers were dissatisfied with the government of the Bangladesh Awami League and President Sheikh Mujibur Rahman. Hashem was at a meeting of army officers at the 2nd Field Artillery quarter guard which was commanded by Major Khandaker Abdur Rashid and Major Syed Faruque Rahman. The officers gathered were briefed by Syed Faruque Rahman on the plan to remove Sheikh Mujibur Rahman. On 15 August 1975, Sheikh Mujibur Rahman was killed by the army officers along with 22 members of his family. Khandker Mushtaq Ahmed was made the president by the army officers.

Hashem left Bangladesh on 3 November 1975 after the Jail Killing of AHM Qamaruzzaman, former home minister, M Mansur Ali, the former finance minister, Tajuddin Ahmad, former prime minister, and Syed Nazrul Islam, former acting president of Bangladesh. They were imprisoned in Dhaka Central Jail after the 15 August 1975 Bangladesh coup d'état and the assassination of Sheikh Mujibur Rahman and his family members. Hashem was appointed to a diplomatic post in Ottawa, Canada, by the government of Lieutenant General Ziaur Rahman. He and the other army officers were protected from prosecution through the passage of the Indemnity Ordinance by Khandker Mushtaq Ahmed. On 18 August 1996, the ordinance was scrapped after Bangladesh Awami League was elected to power.

On 15 October 1998, he was charged in the Jail Killing case along with 22 other people by Bangladesh Police. On 20 October 2004 he was sentenced to life in prison by the trial court in his absence. On 29 August 2008, the Bangladesh High Court announced its verdict on the appeals filed on the trial court verdict. The court kept his sentence, given by the trial court, as he was one of the 8 convicts who did not file with the High Court.

On 8 November 1998, Judge Golam Rasul of the Dhaka Sessions sentenced Hashem and 14 other individuals in the Sheikh Mujibur Rahman assassination case. On 14 December 2000, Hashem was acquitted in the assassination of Sheikh Mujibur Rahman case. After the verdict was read his home in Don Chamber area, Narayanganj District, Bangladesh was attacked and vandalized. Showkat Hashem, his brother and Bangladesh Nationalist Party leader, filed a case against Shamim Osman and 81 other people over the attack on the house on 14 December 2001. On 30 April 2001, Justice Mohammad Fazlul Karim confirmed the acquaintance of Hashem in the case.

== Death ==
Hashem died on 26 March 2015 in Montreal, Canada.
