= Old Dhaka Central Jail =

Former jail in Bangladesh

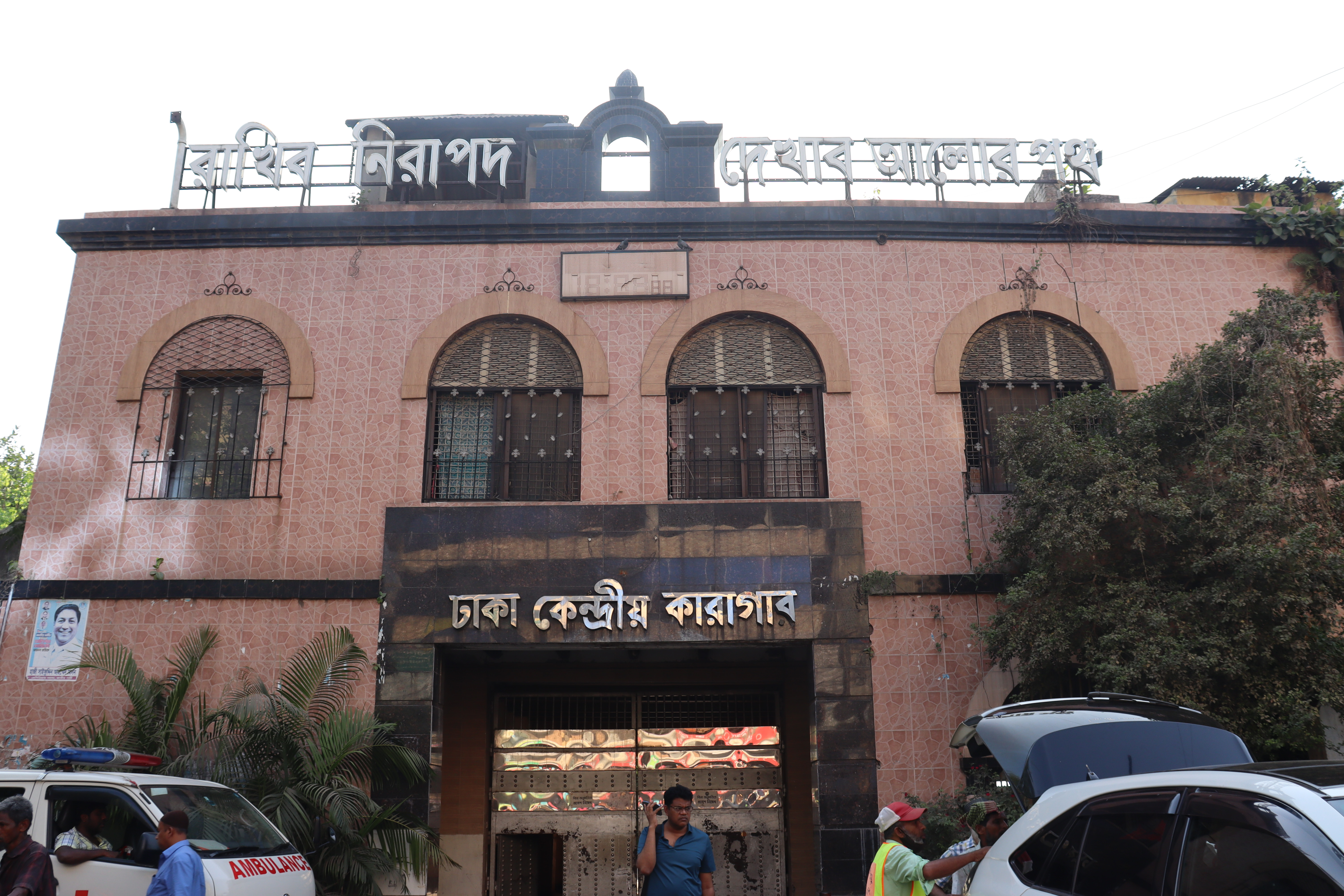
- Main gate of Dhaka Central Jail, Old Dhaka, Bangladesh
- Interactive map of Old Dhaka Central Jail
- Location: Nazimuddin Road, Chawkbazar, Old Dhaka; 23.7186°N 90.3981°E
- Status: Unknown
- Security class: Maximum
- Capacity: 2,500
- Opened: 1778; 248 years ago
- Closed: 2016; 10 years ago
- Former name: Dhaka Central Jail
- Managed by: Bangladesh Jail

Dhaka Central Jail was the largest jail in Bangladesh, located in the old section of Dhaka, the country's capital. The jail has been used to house criminals as well as political prisoners, especially during the Language Movement of 1952, the 6 Point Movement, and the Bangladesh War of Independence.

However, the jail earned infamy after the killings of four political leaders — A. H. M. Qamaruzzaman, Tajuddin Ahmad, Syed Nazrul Islam and Captain Muhammad Mansur Ali — on the eve of a military counter-coup on 3 November 1975, against the government of president Khondaker Mostaq Ahmad and army chief Ziaur Rahman, which was in power after 15 August after the assassination of Sheikh Mujibur Rahman. The slain leaders are mourned by many in Bangladesh today, with the date informally known as "Jail killing day."

== History ==
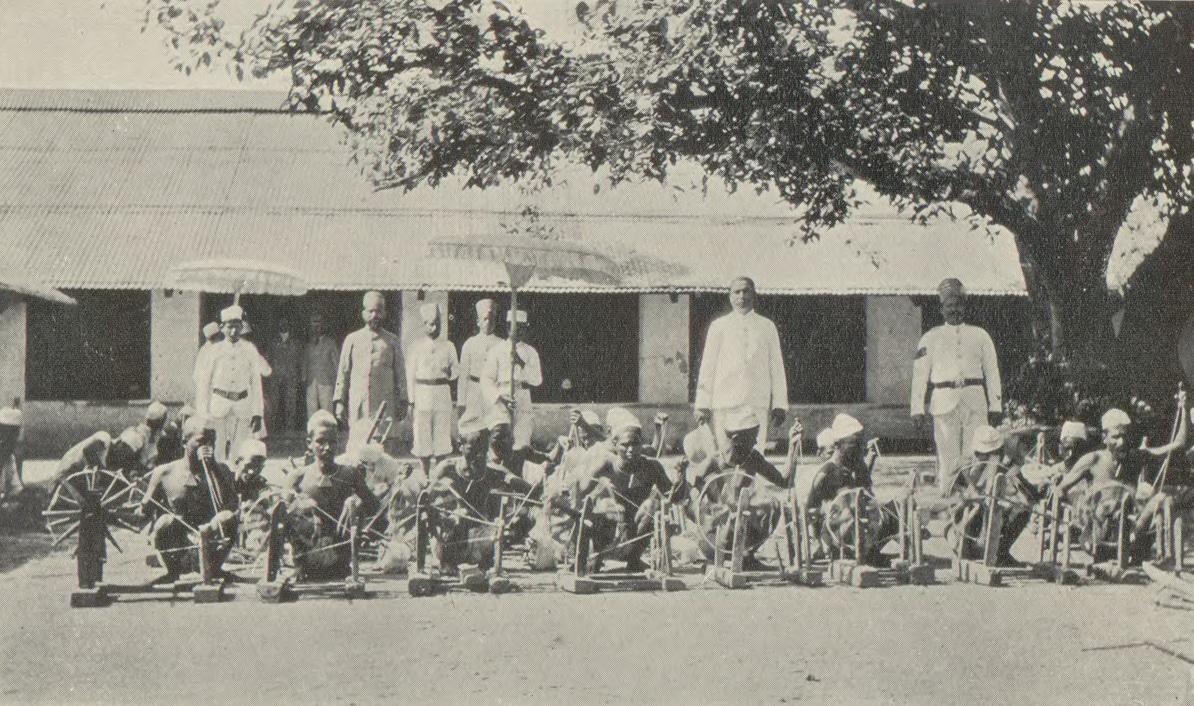
Prisoners at work in 1906

Before British rule, there was a Mughal fort at the site of the current jail. In 1788, the fort was renovated, and converted into a jail. Until 1836, the Kotowali Police station was also co-located here. Records from 1833 show that the capacity of the jail at that time was 800 inmates. However, the jail had an average of 526 inmates every day. The Dhaka jail was converted into the central jail for East Bengal. After the proclamation of Bangladeshi Independence by Sheikh Mujibur Rahman in 1971, pro-independence guards working at the jail freed inmates from the prisons, prompting the Pakistan army to attack and take control of the jail. After the establishment of Bangladesh, the prison returned to its original form.

A jail museum was opened here in 2013 and the following year, it was included under the Bangladesh National Museum. In 2015, a ruin from the period of Muslim rulers was found in the prison area, and the following year, an archaeological excavation was undertaken. The jail has been shifted to the new Dhaka Central Jail, Keraniganj in July 2016. In 2017, a project was undertaken to preserve the prison grounds for historical needs. The design by Form Three Architects was finalized in a competition held for the proposed project and work on the project was inaugurated in 2019. According to the design, a cultural center and multipurpose complex will be constructed and in the prison area. Two museums are included in the proposed plan. In 2024, it was reported that pre-Mughal remains of the old fort of Dhaka mentioned by historian Alauddin Isfahani was discovered from the excavation along with rolled and glazed potteries. It was reported in 2025 that B section, one of the three sections of the proposed project under construction, would be open for public in October 2025. It would include a jail model, a mosque, a shopping mall, a pond and walkway.

== Notable inmates ==
- Harendranath Munshi
- Begum Khaleda Zia
- Motiur Rahman Nizami
- Salahuddin Quader Chowdhury
- A. H. M. Qamaruzzaman
- Tajuddin Ahmad
- Syed Nazrul Islam
- Muhammad Mansur Ali
- Abdul Quader Mollah
- Muhammad Kamaruzzaman
- Ali Ahsan Mohammad Mojaheed
- Sheikh Mujibur Rahman
- Hussain Muhammad Ershad

== In popular culture ==
A Bangladeshi TV series, Karagar was shot at this former jail in 2022.

== See also ==
- Kashimpur Central Jail
