= Nurul Islam Manzur =

Bangladeshi politician and former State Minister (1936–2020)

Member of Parliament

Personal details
- Born: 26 May 1936
- Died: 26 May 2020 (aged 84); Dhaka
- Political party: Bangladesh Nationalist Party

Nurul Islam Manzur (Bengali: নূরুল ইসলাম মঞ্জুর; 26 May 1936 – 26 May 2020) was a former Bangladesh Awami League politician and the former State Minister of Communication in the cabinet of Sheikh Mujibur Rahman. He was aligned with the Bangladesh Nationalist Party.

== Career ==
Manzur was elected to Parliament in 1973, the first parliament of Bangladesh, from Bakerganj-8 as a candidate of Bangladesh Awami League. He served in the Fourth Sheikh Mujib cabinet as the State Minister of Communication. He was dismissed from the post by Sheikh Mujibur Rahman on 21 July 1975. According to the sources of the United States Embassy in Dhaka, he was removed due to his rivalry with Abdur Rab Serniabat, the Minister of Flood Control and Water Development and brother-in-law of President Sheikh Mujibur Rahman. The two had a rivalry centering on Barisal District, their home district. He joined the Moshtaque Ahmad government after the assassination of Sheikh Mujibur Rahman as State Minister for Railways and Communication.

Manzur was arrested in 1999 along with KM Obaidur Rahman, and Shah Moazzem Hossain in the jail killing case in 1999 by the Bangladesh Awami League government. Their arrests were protested by 109 Members of Parliament of Bangladesh Nationalist Party. The jail killing refers to the killing of four national leaders in jail following the 15 August 1975 Bangladesh coup d'état and Assassination of Sheikh Mujibur Rahman. The court cleared them of the charges in 2004 when Bangladesh Nationalist Party was in power.

== Death ==
Nurul Islam Manzur died on 26 May 2020.
