= Shamsul Haque (Dhaka politician) =

Bangladeshi politician

Member of Bangladesh Parliament
- In office 18 February 1979 – 12 February 1982

Personal details
- Born: 2 February 1922 Keraniganj thana, British India
- Died: 1982
- Party: Bangladesh Nationalist Party
- Children: 5, including Shariful Haque Dalim

Shamsul Haque (Bengali: শামসুল হক: 1922 – 1982) is a Bangladesh Nationalist Party politician and a former member of parliament for Dhaka-11.

== Biography ==
Mohammad Shamsul Haque was born on 2 February 1922 in what is now Keraniganj Upazila, Dhaka District, Bangladesh.

He was a fisheries officer, but left the job after his son, Shariful Haque Dalim, assassinated President Sheikh Mujibur Rahman.

Haque was elected to parliament from Dhaka-11 as a Bangladesh Nationalist Party candidate in 1979.

Haque died in 1982. Mushuri Khola Samsul Haque High School, in Savar, is named after him.
