= 1980 Bangladeshi coup attempt =

Failed coup in Bangladesh

1980 Bangladesh coup d'état attempt
Date	17 June 1980
Location	Bangladesh
Result	Coup unsuccessful

Belligerents
Government of Bangladesh	Jatiya Samajtantrik Dal Purba Banglar Sarbahara Party

Commanders and leaders
(Bangladesh) Ziaur Rahman	Sultan Shahriar Rashid Khan Shariful Haque Dalim

On 17 June 1980, a coup d'état against President Ziaur Rahman of Bangladesh failed, resulting in the deaths of a few hundred army officers and enlisted men.

== History ==
The coup was led by the left-wing Jatiya Samajtantrik Dal and Purba Banglar Sarbahara Party, who motivated an uprising at the Dhaka Cantonment on 17 June 1980. The aim was to seize power while President Ziaur Rahman was outside of Bangladesh in London. The coup was crushed by the government of Bangladesh. The coup resulted in the death of a few hundred army officers and enlisted men.

Sultan Shahriar Rashid Khan and Shariful Haque Dalim were involved in the coup and fled their diplomatic posts. Khan returned after reaching an "understanding" with President Ziaur Rahman. Dalim returned to his post after President Hussain Mohammad Ershad came to power. Abdul Aziz Pasha was arrested for his involvement with the coup but was released after reaching a deal with President Ziaur Rahman.
