= Abdul Kahar Akond =

Bangladeshi police officer

Abdul Kahar Akond (Bengali: আব্দুল কাহার আকন্দ) is an Awami League leader, and was Bangladeshi police officer who served as the additional DIG of police in the Criminal Investigation Department.

== Career in Police ==
Akond investigated major crimes during the first Sheikh Hasina led Awami League government from 1996 to 2001.

Akond was fired from the Criminal Investigation Department after the Bangladesh Nationalist Party came to power in 2001.

Akond was appointed to the CID again on 28 January 2009 and retired a day after.

Akond was appointed to the Criminal Investigation Department on 19 February 2009 on a two-year contract which would be extended multiple times.

On 16 January 2017, Akond was promoted to the rank of additional deputy inspector general of police.

Akond's contract was extended for two years on 14 February 2018. He was awarded the Bangladesh Police Medal on 7 February 2019.

== Political Career ==
Akhond collected the nomination form from Awami League to contest from the Kishoreganj-2 constituency in the 2024 national election and received the nomination of the party. However, he lost the poll to Md Sohrab Uddin, an independent candidate.

== Important cases ==
=== Assassination of Sheikh Mujibur Rahman ===
Akond was appointed the investigation officer of the assassination of Sheikh Mujibur Rahman and the 15 August 1975 Bangladesh coup d'état 18 August 1996 after Sheikh Hasina came to power. He detained Khairuzzaman, K. M. Obaidur Rahman, Shah Moazzem Hossain, Sultan Shahriar Rashid Khan, Syed Farook Rahman, and Taheruddin Thakur in the case.

=== Assassination of General Muhammed Abul Manzur ===
Akond was the investigation officer in the murder case of General Muhammed Abul Manzur who was killed in the aftermath of the assassination of Ziaur Rahman in 1981. On 20 March 2017, Dhaka Court granted the 12th three months extension to the investigation.

=== 2004 grenade attack ===
Akond was the investigation officer of 2004 Dhaka grenade attack. He testified on 8 October 2009 that grenades were supplied from then government minister's, Abdus Salam Pintu, home. On 3 November 2010, Metropolitan Sessions Judge Mohammad Zohurul Hoque ordered Akond to investigate the flow of money from Pakistan to Bangladesh for the attack through Western Union and Dutch-Bangla Bank Limited. On 25 September 2016, he testified that three former officers of the Criminal Investigation Department where involved in the cover-up of the 2004 Dhaka grenade attack. The Bangladesh Nationalist Party described Akond as an Awami League leader and called for his removal from the investigation.

=== BDR mutiny ===
Akond was the chief investigation officer of the 2009 Bangladesh Rifles mutiny. He led a 250-person team of the Criminal Investigation Department to investigate the mutiny. He pressed charges against 824 individuals on 24 counts in October 2010 over their role in the mutiny. On 4 February 2014, a Dhaka court ordered the Criminal Investigation Department to take departmental actions against Akond after it found he had been biased in favor of Torab Ali, an Awami League politician and an accused in the mutiny case, during his investigations. On 28 November 2017, Torab Ali was acquitted in the case by a court in Dhaka. It was alleged by human rights organizations that soldiers in the mutiny case were tortured in the custody of the Criminal Investigation Department which was denied by Akond.
