= Abdul B. Manjoor Rahim =

Bangladeshi diplomat

Ambassador of Bangladesh to Germany
- In office June 2005 – February 2007
- Preceded by: Alimul Haque

Ambassador of Bangladesh to Myanmar
- In office 12 September 2002 – 28 June 2005
- Preceded by: Ahmed Rahim
- Succeeded by: Mohamed Khairuzzaman

Personal details
- Education: University of Dhaka
- Occupation: Diplomat

Abdul B. Manjoor Rahim is a Bangladeshi career diplomat and former foreign secretary of Bangladesh. He has served as the Ambassador of Bangladesh to several countries, including Myanmar and Germany.

== Early life and education ==
Rahim completed both his bachelor's and master's in history from the University of Dhaka.

== Career ==
Rahim joined the Bangladesh Civil Service (Foreign Affairs) in the 1979 batch.

Rahim has served in various important roles throughout his diplomatic career. He held positions in the Ministry of Foreign Affairs in Dhaka and at several Bangladesh missions abroad, including in Rome, Seoul, Stockholm, and Jeddah. He was the Counsellor and Head of Chancery of the Permanent Mission of Bangladesh to the United Nations in New York City.

In September 2002, Rahim was appointed as the Ambassador of Bangladesh to Myanmar. In June 2005, the government of Bangladesh appointed him as the ambassador to Germany. In February 2007, he was appointed Foreign Secretary of Bangladesh.

== Personal life ==
Rahim lives in Calgary, Canada.
