= Shariful Haque Dalim =

Bangladeshi retired army officer and freedom fighter (born 1946)

Shariful Haque Dalim BU
- শরিফুল হক ডালিম

Bangladesh Commissioner to Hong Kong
- In office 1 December 1982 – 6 May 1988
- President: Abdus Sattar; A. F. M. Ahsanuddin Chowdhury

Bangladesh High Commissioner to Kenya
- In office 1988–1995
- President: A. F. M. Ahsanuddin Chowdhury; Hussain Muhammad Ershad

Personal details
- Born: 2 February 1946 (age 80) Dhaka, Bengal, British India
- Spouse: Nimmi Chowdhury (died 2005)
- Children: 1
- Parent: Shamsul Haque (father)
- Known for: 15 August 1975 coup d'état
- Awards: Bir Uttom
- Website: majordalimbubangla.com

Military service
- Allegiance: Pakistan; Bangladesh
- Branch/service: Pakistan Air Force; Pakistan Army; Bangladesh Army
- Years of service: 1967–1976
- Rank: Lieutenant colonel (Retd.)
- Unit: Armoured Corps
- Commands: Company Commander of Bengal Lancers; Sub-Commander of Sector - I
- Battles/wars: Indo-Pakistani War of 1965; Bangladesh Liberation War; 15 August 1975 Bangladeshi coup d'état UNOSOM I
- Criminal information
- Status: Self-imposed exile; Subject of arrest warrant by the Supreme Court of Bangladesh
- Criminal charge: Murder
- Penalty: Sentenced to death in the Sheikh Mujib assassination case and life imprisonment in the Jail Killing case
- Wanted by: Government of Bangladesh

Shariful Haque Dalim (Bengali: শরিফুল হক ডালিম; born 2 February 1946) popularly known as Major Dalim, is a retired army officer of Bangladesh Army and a diplomat. He was convicted for his part in the 15 August 1975 Bangladeshi coup d'état.

== Early life ==
Dalim was born in Dacca at Bengal Presidency of British India to Shamsul Haque a textile businessman and former member of parliament for Dhaka-11 in the Ziaur Rahman ministry.

== Career ==
=== Military ===
Dalim enlisted to Pakistan Air Force Academy in Risalpur of then West Pakistan on 1964 after finishing high school. His training was halted soon after the Indo-Pakistani war of 1965. After war, Dalim was instead sent back to Pakistan Military Academy to complete his military training. He was then again commissioned with the Armoured Corps in 1967 in the rank of second lieutenant.

On 1971, Dalim was in West Pakistan and opted to enter India to join the Mukti Bahini in Bangladesh Liberation War. After his defection he served as the Aide-de-camp to commander of Z Force lieutenant colonel Ziaur Rahman. In acknowledgment of his role and contributions, he was awarded the title of Bir Uttom and was promoted to the rank of major.

After the independence of Bangladesh however, Dalim while serving as squadron commander for the Bengal Lancers was dismissed due to breach of discipline in 1974.

=== Diplomatic ===
In 1976, he was sent as a diplomat to China after being assigned to the Ministry of Foreign Affairs. Dalim voluntarily retires from army the same year for enlisting with the foreign affairs ministry. In 1980, he joined the London High Commission. From December 1982 to May 1988, he was commissioner at the consulate in Hong Kong. Then he was high commissioner to Kenya. At the same time he was given charge of Tanzania and also permanent representative of Bangladesh to UNEP and HABITAT. He also held the special responsibility of overall supervision of the army personnel to be sent as part of the United Nations Peacekeeping Force during the war in Somalia. He retired from government service in 1995.

== Coup d'états ==
=== 15 August 1975 Bangladeshi coup d'état ===
Dalim, along with a few other officers of the army including major Syed Faruque Rahman and major Khandaker Abdur Rashid, planned a coup which took place on 15 August 1975. He was asked to lead the attack on Dhanmondi 32 but he refused to do so. He was then given charge of the 2nd Field Artillery Regiment proxying major Rashid. As the coup was taking place, Dalim took control of Bangladesh Betar Radio station and made an announcement stating,

I am Major Dalim speaking; autocrat Sheikh Mujibur Rahman has been killed. The army led by Khondaker Mostaq Ahmad has taken over power. Curfew has been declared.

During the speech, he also unofficially announced the proclamation of an Islamic Republic. However, this would later be ignored. Meanwhile, Brigade Commander Brigadier Quazi Golam Dastgir immediately phoned the radio station and ordered them not to broadcast Dalim's announcement.

After the coup, Khondaker Mostaq Ahmad succeeded him as the president. The new president declared martial law and passed the 1975 Indemnity Act which provided legal protection to those involved in the coup. After the killing of then president Sheikh Mujibur Rahman on 15 August 1975, he was reinstated in Bangladesh Army and promoted to the rank of lieutenant colonel and served in the Armed Forces Division for a brief time.

=== 3 November 1975 Bangladeshi coup d'état ===
During the initial stages of Brigadier Khaled Mosharraf's coup, Dalim and Lt. Colonel Noor went over to the cantonment to surrender. They also negotiated with President Khondaker Mostaq Ahmed on behalf of General Musharraf and Dalim personally tried to convince retired General Osmani and Lt. Colonel Rashid to surrender. Eventually, he convinced General Musharraf and Colonel Shafaat Jamil to accept a deal wherein all 17 men who planned Mujib's assassination, including Dalim, would go into exile.

== Exiled life ==
In 1996, the Awami League government, led by Mujib's daughter Sheikh Hasina began prosecution process for the case. Dalim was again demoted and listed as dismissed by contrast to retirement from the army. He was sentenced to death in absentia. According to some reports, he lived in Pakistan on a Kenyan passport and had business interests in Africa.

=== Public appearance ===
Shariful Haque Dalim had been in hiding for an extended period due to his controversial role in Bangladesh's political history, particularly his involvement in the 1975 military coup that resulted in the assassination of Sheikh Mujibur Rahman. Convicted in absentia for his role in the coup, he faced legal and political challenges during Sheikh Hasina's rule, which made his return to public life difficult.

Following the fall of Sheikh Hasina's regime and the political upheaval in Bangladesh in August 2024, Dalim resurfaced publicly on 5 January 2025, in a live interview on the YouTube channel of expatriate journalist Elias Hossain. In the interview, Dalim spoke about his life in hiding, contemporary political issues, and his perspective on his role in shaping Bangladeshi history.

== Personal life ==
Dalim was married to Nimmi Chowdhury until her death in 2005 and has one daughter. His younger brother is Kamrul Haque Swapan and younger sister is Mohua Haque.

== Bibliography ==
Dalim has written many books in English, Bangla, and Urdu. He shares his experiences and opinions in his writings and adds historical context based on what he has witnessed.

- Dalim, Shariful Haque (2001). যা দেখেছি, যা বুঝেছি, যা করেছি (in Bengali) (1st ed.). Dhaka: Nobojagoron Prokashoni. ASIN B0DV2G3KPY.
- Dalim, Shariful Haque (2002). আমি মেজর ডালিম বলছি (in Bengali) (1st ed.). Dhaka: Bornolipi Prokashoni. ASIN B0DFY6RM5P.
- Dalim, Shariful Haque (2002). কিছু কথা কিছু ব্যাথা (in Bengali) (1st ed.). ASIN B0DV25LX85.
- Dalim, Shariful Haque (2025). জিয়া থেকে খালেদা অতঃপর (in Bengali) (1st ed.). Dhaka: Adarsholipi Prokashon. ISBN 9789848126387.
- Dalim, Shariful Haque (2011). Bangladesh, Untold Facts. Jumhoori Publications. ISBN 978-9698455989.
- Dalim, Shariful Haque. জাতীয় বিপ্লব ও সংহতি দিবস এবং অব্যাহতি আইনসমূহ.

== See also ==
- 15 August 1975 Bangladeshi coup d'état
- 3 November 1975 Bangladeshi coup d'état
- Assassination of Sheikh Mujibur Rahman
