= Dhaka Ladies Club =

- Formation: 1951
- Headquarters: Dhaka, Bangladesh
- Region served: Bangladesh
- Official language: Bengali
- Website: Dhaka Ladies Club

Dhaka Ladies Club is a club for "elite" women in Dhaka, Bangladesh. Anisha Haque is the present president of the club.

== History ==
The club was opened in 1951 by a selected number of "elite" women. The founder of the club was Shamsia Shahbuddin who was the wife of the then Chief Justice' of East Pakistan Justice Shahabuddin. In 1955 one acre of land was bought in Eskaton, Dhaka by the then President of the club, Begum Amiruddin.

The club was registered under Joint Stock companies Act in 1960. The club is run 16 members Executive Committee who are elected for terms of three years. The club runs regular and music schools for underprivileged children in Dhaka. Former Prime Minister Khaleda Zia holds press conferences in the club auditorium.
