= Abdul Aziz Pasha =

Bangladeshi officer and coup member (died 2001)

- আবদুল আজিজ পাশা
- Died: 2 June 2001; Harare, Zimbabwe
- Education: Pakistan Military Academy
- Military career
- Allegiance: Pakistan (Before 1971); Bangladesh
- Branch: Pakistan Army; Bangladesh Army
- Service years: 1969–1996
- Rank: Lieutenant Colonel
- Unit: Regiment of Artillery
- Commands: Company Commander of K Force; Commander of 1st Field Artillery Battery
- Known for: Assassination of Sheikh Mujibur Rahman

Abdul Aziz Pasha (died 2 June 2001) was a Bangladesh army officer who was convicted for involvement in the 1975 assassination of Sheikh Mujibur Rahman.

== Career ==
=== Bangladesh Liberation War ===
Pasha had fought for the independence of Bangladesh during the Bangladesh Liberation War in 1971. He was the commanding officer of the first artillery battery raised, which was known as the Mujib Battery. Pasha's companions from the war described him as "an easy going and laid-back" person.

=== Assassination of Sheikh Mujibur Rahman ===
On 15 August 1975, Sheikh Mujibur Rahman, the president of Bangladesh, was assassinated during a military coup. Pasha was one of the 12 confessed assassins. He and Risaldar Moslemuddin gunned down Sheikh Mujibur Rahman's wife, Sheikh Fazilatunnesa Mujib; Sheikh Jamal and his wife, Rosy; and Sheikh Kamal's wife, Sultana.

After the assassination of Sheikh Mujibur Rahman, the new government, headed by Lieutenant General Ziaur Rahman, appointed Aziz as the first secretary to the Bangladesh embassy in Rome. He was arrested in Dhaka for his role in the 17 June 1980 attempted coup in Bangladesh. He was freed after agreeing to turn state witness. He was then posted to Nairobi, Kenya. He was in Zimbabwe when the Bangladesh Awami League government recalled him to Dhaka. He refused to return and, as a result, was dismissed from the foreign service. He applied for and received political asylum in Zimbabwe.

Lt Colonel Abdul Aziz Pasha

On 8 November 1998, Pasha, along with 15 other defendants, was sentenced to death for his role in the assassination of Sheikh Mujibur Rahman. On 14 December 2000, the Bangladesh High Court confirmed his death sentence.

== Death ==
Pasha died on 2 June 2001 in Zimbabwe.

=== Pension ===
The Awami League government, which came to power in 1996, dismissed him from government service. When the Bangladesh Nationalist Party came to power in 2001, they changed the government decision to show that he retired from service. This entitled his widow, Mahfuza Pasha, to his government pension.

=== Legacy ===
After the assassination of President Sheikh Mujibur Rahman, Pasha purchased the house of Jitendra Lal Basu in Sreebari, Ghior Upazila, Manikganj. His house was seized by police in 1997 when an arrest warrant was issued for him. His house was bought by his brother in 2001 after he died. On 31 January 2010, the house was vandalized and burned down by activists of the Bangladesh Awami League.
