= Mohammad Muzammel Hossain =

20th Chief Justice of Bangladesh

Md. Muzammel Hossain
- মোঃ মোজাম্মেল হোসেন

20th Chief Justice of Bangladesh
- In office 18 May 2011 – 16 January 2015
- Appointed by: Zillur Rahman
- President: Zillur Rahman; Mohammad Abdul Hamid
- Prime Minister: Sheikh Hasina
- Preceded by: A. B. M. Khairul Haque
- Succeeded by: Surendra Kumar Sinha

Personal details
- Born: 17 January 1948 (age 78) Kishoreganj, East Bengal, Dominion of Pakistan
- Education: University of Dhaka; University of Sheffield

Md. Muzammel Hossain (born 17 January 1948) is a Bangladeshi jurist who served as the 20th Chief Justice of Bangladesh.

== Early life and education ==
Hossain was born in Kishoreganj on 17 January 1948 to Ahmed Hossain. Hossain obtained his LLB degree in 1970, MA degree in journalism in 1971 from the University of Dhaka, LLM degree from University of Sheffield in 1977 and Barrister-at-Law from Hon'ble Society of Lincoln's Inn, London, UK in 1980.

Hossain participated in a seminar on Racial Equality in UK in 1976, a conference at UK on "The Courts of the Commonwealth and Judicial Precedent in the Commonwealth" in 1977 and the Saarc Law Conference in Pakistan in 1977.

Hossain worked as a law faculty at University of Miadiguri in Nigeria, a professor at City Law College, Dhanmondi Law College and Bhuiyan Academy in Dhaka, and an examiner of both LLB (Hons) and LLM Examinations at the University of Dhaka.

== Career ==
Hossain was enrolled as an advocate of the District Court and the High Court (HC) Division of SC in February, 1971 and 1978 respectively.

Hossain was elevated to the post of judge of the High Court Division on 27 April 1998, and judge of the Appellate Division on 16 July 2009. He became Chairman of the Bangladesh Judicial Service Pay Commission on 16 May 2010.

On 18 May 2011, Hossain became the Chief Justice of Bangladesh.

== Judgments ==
During his judgeship period in the Appellate Division, Hossain delivered a number of landmark judgments including those on the killing of Sheikh Mujibur Rahman and the 5th and 13th amendments to the constitution.
