= Rashed Chowdhury =

Bangladeshi officer and coup member

- Military career
- Allegiance: Pakistan (Before 1971); Bangladesh
- Branch: Pakistan Army; Bangladesh Army
- Service years: 1968-1996
- Rank: Lieutenant Colonel
- Unit: Regiment of Artillery
- Commands: Deputy Commander of Z Force; Adjutant of 2nd Field Artillery Battery; CO of 4th Field Artillery Regiment
- Known for: Assassination of Sheikh Mujibur Rahman
- Conflicts: Bangladesh Liberation War
- Awards: Bir Protik (Revoked)

Rashed Chowdhury is a Bangladeshi military official who is a retired Bangladesh Army officer. Chowdhury was a participant in the coup that led to the assassination of Sheikh Mujibur, the founding president of Bangladesh, in 1975. His specific role in the coup is in dispute.

After the coup, the new constitution granted him and other conspirators immunity and he went on to work as a diplomat for the Bangladesh government. After Sheikh Hasina's election in 1996, he travelled to the United States and requested asylum which was granted. He has been convicted and sentenced to death in absentia and the Bangladesh government is seeking his extradition.

== 1971 Bangladesh Liberation War ==
Chowdhury fought in the 1971 Bangladesh Liberation War and was awarded Bir Protik, the fourth highest gallantry award in Bangladesh. However, Chowdhury's award was revoked, along with the awards of several other soldiers involved in the assassination of Sheikh Mujib when the Awami League came to power.

== 15 August 1975 coup ==
In 1975, some dissatisfied Bangladesh Army officers planned to remove the government of Sheikh Mujib through a military coup d'état, the date they selected was 15 August 1975. On 14 August the officers met to finalize the plan. They attacked Sheikh Mujib's house, killing him along with his entire family, except two of his daughters who were living abroad, on 15 August. Chowdhury was promoted to the rank of lieutenant colonel by the regime that followed.

Chowdhury's involvement in the August 15 killings is disputed. According to a since-recanted confession, he was a member of the squad that attacked the house of Abdur Rab Serniabat who was killed in the attack. He himself has claimed that he was first informed on the morning of 15 August 1975 and was tasked with securing a nearby radio station which he did without fighting.

== Career as a diplomat ==
Following an abortive coup on 17 June 1980, Chowdhury was sent to the Bangladeshi diplomatic mission in Nigeria, where he worked till 1984. Chowdhury was in a diplomatic posting in Brazil when the Bangladesh Awami League and Sheikh Mujibur's daughter, Sheikh Hasina, came to power in 1996. He left his post and traveled to the United States with his wife and child on a visitor's visa after the government of Bangladesh recalled him.

== Asylum and trial ==
Chowdhury applied for political asylum in the United States in 1996 and was granted it in 2004. His asylum status was upheld by the Board of Immigration Appeals in 2006.

While in the United States, he was tried in Bangladesh in absentia for his participation in the August 15 killings and the Bangladesh High Court sentenced him and eleven other people to death. On 19 November 2009, the Bangladesh Supreme Court upheld the High Court verdict. His conviction was based on the confessions of a co-defendant who alleged that Chowdhury was involved in the attack and assassination of Serniabat. According to the United States asylum proceedings, the witness later recanted their statement, saying they were tortured before signing the paper they never read.

In the following years, Bangladesh officials have requested the extradition of Chowdhury multiple times. In 2020, United States Attorney General William Barr reopened the case, a move Chowdhury's attorneys have described as a favour to Bangladesh.

== Bibliography ==
- A Soldier's Debt: Sometimes the Only Way to Run ... is to the Other Side. Rashed Chowdhury. 2015. ISBN 978-1-5174-6110-2.
- Village Boy to Accidental Soldier. CreateSpace Independent Publishing Platform. 18 January 2017. ISBN 978-1-5394-6669-7.
- President Ziaur Rahman: Legendary Leader of Bangladesh. Writers Republic LLC. 25 June 2021. ISBN 978-1637285732.
