= Indemnity Ordinance, 1975 =

1975 immunity law in Bangladesh

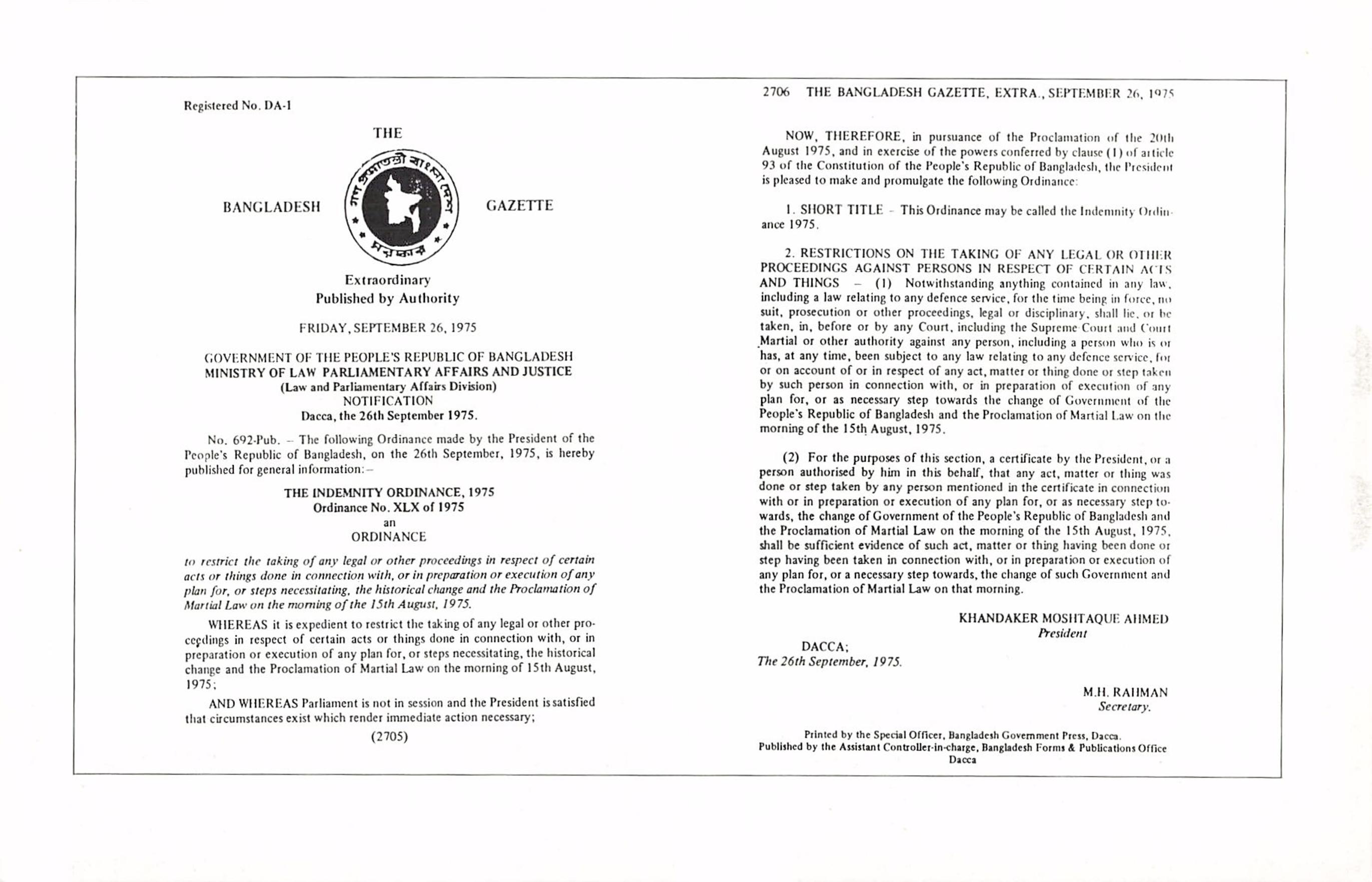

President of Bangladesh Jatiya Sangsad
- Long title: Indemnity Ordinance, 1975
- Citation: Ordinance No. 50 of 1975
- Territorial extent: Bangladesh
- Enacted by: Ordinance enacted by President Khondaker Mostaq Ahmed in 1975; Act enacted by President Ziaur Rahman in 1979.
- Enacted: 26 September 1975

Repeals
- Indemnity (Repeal) Act, 1996

Amended by
- Indemnity Act, 1979
- Status: Repealed

The Indemnity Ordinance, 1975 was a controversial law enacted by the martial law administration of Bangladesh on 26 September 1975. It provided legal immunity to all persons involved in the assassination of Sheikh Mujibur Rahman, who was killed with most of his family on 15 August 1975. Immunity meant the assassins were immune from any legal action. The surviving family members of Sheikh Mujibur Rahman were unable to file a murder case against the assassins due to this law.

The ordinance was converted into an Act of Parliament by the Bangladesh Nationalist Party on 9 July 1979 through the Indemnity Act, 1979. When the Awami League led by Sheikh Mujib's surviving daughter Sheikh Hasina was elected to power in 1996, the law was repealed through the Indemnity (Repeal) Act, 1996.

== Provisions ==
Published in an Extraordinary Bangladesh Gazette, the main purpose of the ordinance was described as being:

to restrict the taking of any legal or other proceedings in respect of certain acts or things done in connection with, or in preparation execution of any plan for, or steps necessitating, the historical change and the proclamation of Martial Law on the morning of the 15th August, 1975.

Whereas it is expedient to restrict the taking of any legal or other proceedings in respect of certain acts or things done in connection with or in preparation or execution of any plan for, or steps necessitating, the historical change and the proclamation of Martial Law on the morning of the 15th August, 1975.

== Legacy ==
Due to the indemnity law, most of the assassins continued to live freely in Bangladesh without any legal repercussions for their actions. Some were even appointed as diplomats of the Bangladeshi government. Two of the assassins, including Colonels Khandaker Abdur Rashid and Syed Faruque Rahman, admitted to killing Sheikh Mujib in TV interviews. The self-confessed assassins regularly traveled abroad. By the time of the law's repeal in 1996, most of them were absconding abroad and became fugitives from the law. As of 2022, many of the assassins continue to be fugitives, including Colonel Rashid.

== Repeal ==
Twenty-one years after the 1975 Ordinance was issued, the law was repealed through the Indemnity (Repeal) Act, 1996 which was passed by the parliament during the first term of Sheikh Hasina as Prime Minister under the presidency of Shahabuddin Ahmed on 12 November 1996. Section 6(c) of the General Clauses Act 1897 states that if a new law repeals an old one, "any right, privilege, obligation or liability acquired, accrued or incurred" on certain people by the old law cannot be affected or repealed by the new repealing law. Since the people involved in Sheikh Mujib's assassination were granted indemnity (a privilege) by the 1975 Ordinance, the 1996 repealing Act stated that "at any time before the coming into force of this Act, if any, the provisions of Section 6 of the General Clauses Act, 1897 (X of 1897) shall not apply and the acts done, arrangements adopted, certificates or orders issued or rights or privileges acquired or liabilities created shall not apply." Thus, the 1996 repealing Act opened the doors for the conspirators of Sheikh Mujib's assassination to be tried and prosecuted under the Bangladeshi Law. The Indemnity (Repeal) Act, 1996 states:

WHEREAS it is expedient and necessary to repeal The Indemnity Ordinance, 1975 (Ordinance Law of 1975); Therefore, it is hereby enacted as follows: —

Section 1. Short Title

1. This Act shall be known as The Indemnity (Repeal) Act, 1996.

Section 2. Repeal of L of 1975

2(1). The Indemnity Ordinance, 1975 (L of 1975, printed as XLX of 1975), hereinafter referred to as the Ordinance, is hereby repealed.

2(2). Any acts done, any arrangements adopted, any certificates or orders issued or any rights or privileges acquired, or any liabilities created for the Government or any authority, under the said Ordinance at any time before the coming into force of this Act, if any, the provisions of Section 6 of the General Clauses Act, 1897 (X of 1897) shall not apply and the acts done, arrangements adopted, certificates or orders issued or rights or privileges acquired or liabilities created shall not apply. Upon the repeal of the said Ordinance by sub-section (1), it shall become ineffective, null and void as if the said Ordinance has not been promulgated and the said Ordinance did not and does not exist.

== See also ==
- Military coups in Bangladesh
