= Syed Nazrul Islam =

Acting President of Provisional government of Bangladesh

- সৈয়দ নজরুল ইসলাম

Minister of Industries
- In office 13 January 1972 – 26 January 1975
- Prime Minister: Sheikh Mujibur Rahman
- Preceded by: Position established
- Succeeded by: Abul Hasnat Muhammad Qamaruzzaman

1st Vice President of Bangladesh
- In office 17 April 1971 – 12 January 1972
- Prime Minister: Tajuddin Ahmad
- Preceded by: Position established
- In office 25 January 1975 – 15 August 1975
- Prime Minister: Muhammad Mansur Ali
- Succeeded by: Mohammad Mohammadullah
- President: Sheikh Mujibur Rahman

Acting President of Provisional Government of Bangladesh
- In office 17 April 1971 – 10 January 1972
- Prime Minister: Tajuddin Ahmad
- Preceded by: Position established
- Succeeded by: Position abolished

Personal details
- Born: 18 February 1925 Kishoreganj, Bengal, British India
- Died: 3 November 1975 (aged 50) Dacca Central Jail, Dhaka, Bangladesh
- Party: Bangladesh Krishak Sramik Awami League (1975)
- Other political affiliations: All-India Muslim League (before 1949); Awami League (1949–1975)
- Children: 6 Including Shafayet, Zakia & Ashraful
- Relatives: Sayed Farooq-ur-Rahman (nephew)
- Education: University of Dhaka
- Awards: Independence Award

Syed Nazrul Islam (Note: Bengali: সৈয়দ নজরুল ইসলাম, romanised: Soiyod Nozrul Islam) (1925 – 3 November 1975) was a Bangladeshi politician and a senior leader of the Awami League. During the Bangladesh War of Independence, he was declared as the Acting President of Bangladesh by the Provisional Government.

== Early life ==
Syed Nazrul Islam was born in 1925 into a Bengali Muslim family of Syeds in the village of Bir Dampara, Jashodal Union in Kishoreganj (then Mymensingh District) of the Bengal Presidency. He obtained degrees in history and law from the University of Dhaka and was an active student political leader in the Muslim League. Nazrul Islam captained his college's cricket and hockey teams and participated in the Pakistan movement. He entered the civil service of Pakistan in 1949 but resigned in 1951 to work as a professor of history at the Ananda Mohan College in Mymensingh, where he also practised law.

== Political career ==
Nazrul Islam's political career began when he joined the Awami Muslim League and participated in the Language Movement in 1952, for which he was arrested by police. He would rise to various provincial and central party leadership positions, becoming a close confidant of the party's leader, Sheikh Mujib. He was jailed during the Six Point Demand movement. He was elected to the National Assembly of Pakistan in 1970, where he served briefly as deputy leader of the majority. Following the arrest of Mujib on 25 March 1971 by Pakistani forces, Syed escaped to Meherpur, Khulna, with other party leaders and proclaimed the independence of Bangladesh. Syed stepped in as the acting president, with Tajuddin Ahmed as the government's prime minister. Syed played a key role in leading the nationalist cause, co-ordinating the BDF guerrilla force, and winning support from India and other nations.

After the independence of Bangladesh, Syed was appointed minister of industries, the deputy leader in parliament, and a member of the constitution committee. When Mujib banned other political parties and assumed sweeping powers as president in 1975, Syed was appointed vice-chairman of the BAKSAL.

== Personal life ==
Nazrul Islam married Syeda Nafisa Islam with whom he had six children. His four sons were Sayed Ashraful Islam, Syed Manzurul Islam Manju, Syed Shariful Islam, and Syed Shafayetul Islam. His older daughter was MP Syeda Zakia Noor Lipi.

== Death ==
Following the assassination of Sheikh Mujibur Rahman on 15 August 1975, Syed went into hiding with other Mujib loyalists such as Tajuddin Ahmad, A. H. M. Qamaruzzaman, and Muhammad Mansur Ali, but was ultimately arrested by the regime of the new president, Khondaker Mostaq Ahmad. The four leaders were imprisoned in the Dhaka Central Jail and assassinated on 3 November under controversial and mysterious circumstances known as the Jail Killing. This day is commemorated every year in Bangladesh as Jail Killing Day. Captain (relieved) Kismat Hashem was sentenced in absentia to life in prison for the killings. He died due to cardiac arrest in Canada.

== Legacy ==
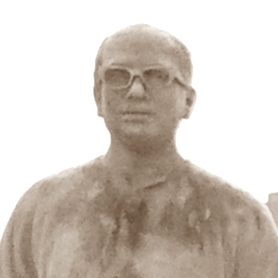
Sculpture of Syed Nazrul Islam in Mujibnagar, Khulna

The government-run Shahid Syed Nazrul Islam Medical College in Kishoreganj is named in his memory. Sayed Ashraful Islam is the son of Sayed Nazrul Islam.

== Notes ==
Political offices
Preceded by Mujibur Rahman	President of Bangladesh; Acting; 1971–1972	Succeeded by Abu Sayeed Chowdhury
Preceded by none	Vice President of Bangladesh; 1971–1972	Succeeded by Abdus Sattar
