= Muhammad Mansur Ali =

Prime Minister of Bangladesh in 1975

Captain Muhammad Mansur Ali
- মুহাম্মদ মনসুর আলী
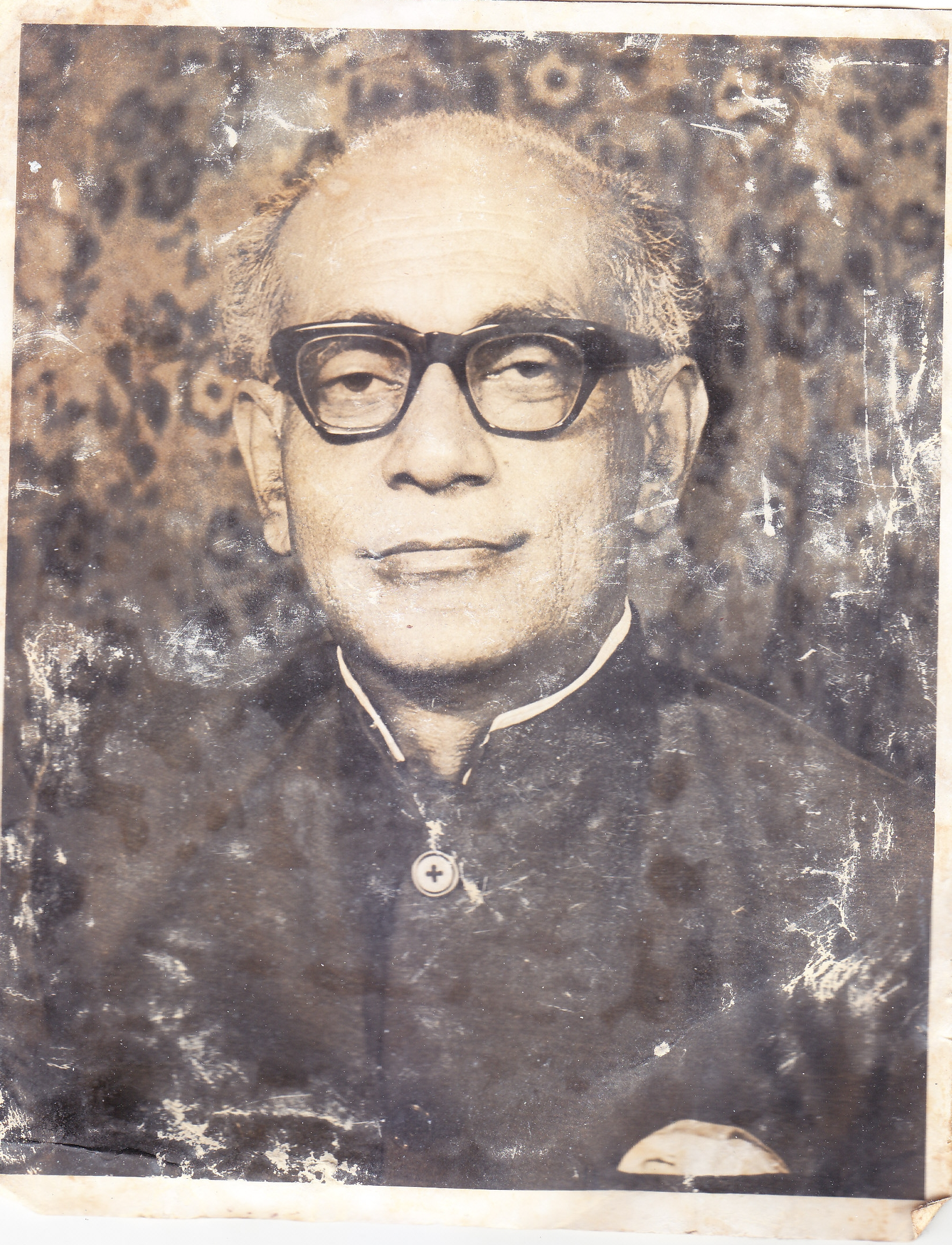

3rd Prime Minister of Bangladesh
- In office 25 January 1975 – 15 August 1975
- President: Sheikh Mujibur Rahman
- Preceded by: Sheikh Mujibur Rahman
- Succeeded by: Mashiur Rahman (acting)

Minister of Finance of the Provisional Government
- In office 17 April 1971 – 12 January 1972
- President: Sheikh Mujibur Rahman; Syed Nazrul Islam (acting)
- Prime Minister: Tajuddin Ahmad
- Succeeded by: Tajuddin Ahmad

2nd Leader of the House
- In office 25 January 1975 – 15 August 1975
- Preceded by: Sheikh Mujibur Rahman
- Succeeded by: Shah Azizur Rahman

Personal details
- Born: 16 January 1917 Kazipur, Sirajganj, Bengal, British India
- Died: 3 November 1975 (aged 58) Dacca Central Jail, Dhaka, Bangladesh
- Party: Bangladesh Krishak Sramik Awami League (1975)
- Other political affiliations: All-India Muslim League (before 1949); Awami League (1949–1975)
- Children: 6, including Mohammad Selim and Mohammed Nasim
- Education: Aligarh Muslim University
- Awards: Independence Award

Muhammad Mansur Ali (Note: Bengali: মুহাম্মদ মনসুর আলী, romanised: Muhammôd Mônsur Ali, pronounced [ˈmuɦamˌmɔd ˈmɔnʃuɾ ˈali]) (16 January 1917 – 3 November 1975) was a Bangladeshi politician who was a close confidant of Sheikh Mujibur Rahman, the founding leader of Bangladesh. A senior leader of the Awami League, Mansur also served briefly as the Prime Minister of Bangladesh in 1975 until he was assassinated while incarcerated on 3 November 1975.

== Early life and education ==
Muhammad Mansur Ali was born on 16 January 1917 to a Bengali Muslim family of Sarkars in the village of Kuripara in Qazipur, Sirajganj (then under Pabna District), Bengal Presidency. His father's name was Haraf Ali Sarkar. Mansur pursued his education in Kolkata Islamia College (now Maulana Azad College), graduating in 1942. He would pursue a MA degree in economics and in 1945 completed a law degree from Aligarh Muslim University.

During this period Mansur became an active member of the Muslim League, which under Muhammad Ali Jinnah demanded a separate Muslim state of Pakistan. He served as the vice-president of the Pabna District Muslim League from 1946 to 1950. He received training at Jessore Cantonment as a captain in PLG (Pakistan Lancers Group) in 1948. Since then he was widely known as Captain Mansur. Deciding to practise law, he enrolled in the Pabna District Court in 1951.

== Career ==
He would soon be elected member of Awami League's central executive committee and president of its Pabna District unit. Mansur was arrested by police in 1952 for helping to organise protests against the declaration of Urdu as the sole official language, in what became known as the Language Movement. Mansur and his party demanded that Bengali also receive recognition and the provinces be granted autonomy. After his release, Mansur was elected a member of the East Pakistan Legislative Assembly in 1954 as a candidate of the United Front alliance of various political parties. In the cabinet headed by Ataur Rahman Khan, Mansur served in different periods as the province's minister of law, parliamentary affairs, food, agriculture, commerce and industry. Mansur was re-arrested in the aftermath of the coup d'état led by Ayub Khan, who became President of Pakistan and imposed martial law. He would remain incarcerated from 1958 to 1959. Mansur Ali played an important role in the Six point movement led by Sheikh Mujibur Rahman, who demanded substantial regional autonomy and opposed the military regime. In the 1970 elections, he was elected member of the legislative assembly. At the outbreak of the Bangladesh Liberation War in 1971, Mansur went underground to organise a government in exile. Mansur became the minister of finance in the Mujibnagar government. After the independence of Bangladesh, Mansur was the minister of communications and later home affairs. After the introduction of a one-party, presidential system in 1975, Mujib became the President of Bangladesh. Mansur was appointed the prime minister. He helped Mujib organise the Bangladesh Krishak Sramik Awami League.

== Personal life ==
He married Begum Amina the daughter of a District Judge from the area of Rangpur. They had five sons and one daughter. His eldest son Dr Mohammad Selim became a lawyer and studied for the BAR at Lincoln's Inn. He is a politician and became Presidium member for Awami League and held the position of Chairman of Bangladesh Foreign Affairs Committee as well as being an MP representing his father's constituency Kazipur in Sirajganj District. Mansur's second son Mohammad Nasim also became a leader of prominence and was MP and held ministerial posts of Telecoms and Home for Awami League government between 1996 and 2001.

== Death ==
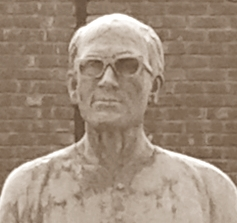
Statue of Muhammad Mansur Ali at Mujibnagar

On 15 August 1975, Mujib was assassinated along with his family by a group of military officers. The 15 August coup d'état was masterminded by Khondaker Mostaq Ahmad, a disgruntled member of Mujib's regime who would become president. Mansur went into hiding immediately after the killing. When Khondaker Mostaq Ahmad invited Awami League leaders such as Mansur Ali, Syed Nazrul Islam, A. H. M. Qamaruzzaman and Tajuddin Ahmad to join his government, they refused. They were arrested by the army on 23 August 1975. Refusing to support Ahmad's regime, they were murdered while incarcerated in the Dhaka Central Jail on 3 November, which was one of the key points for the 3 November coup, which already ousted Ahmad from power again.

== Notes ==
Political offices
| Preceded by Mujibur Rahman | Prime Minister of Bangladesh; 1975 | Succeeded by Mashiur Rahman; Acting |
