= Abul Hasnat Muhammad Qamaruzzaman =

First Home Minister of Bangladesh (1971–1972)

- আবুল হাসনাত মোহাম্মদ কামারুজ্জামান
- A.H.M. Qamaruzzaman

3rd Minister of Industries
- In office 25 January 1975 – 15 August 1975
- President: Sheikh Mujibur Rahman
- Prime Minister: Muhammad Mansur Ali
- Preceded by: Syed Nazrul Islam
- Succeeded by: Sultan Mahmud

5th President of Bangladesh Awami League
- In office 18 January 1974 – 24 February 1975
- General Secretary: Zillur Rahman
- Preceded by: Sheikh Mujibur Rahman
- Succeeded by: Syeda Zohra Tajuddin

Member of the Bangladesh Parliament for Rajshahi-10
- In office 7 April 1973 – 18 January 1974
- Preceded by: Constituency established
- Succeeded by: Mohammad Mohsin

1st Minister of Home Affairs (in exile)
- In office 10 April 1971 – 12 January 1972
- President: Sheikh Mujibur Rahman; Syed Nazrul Islam (acting)
- Prime Minister: Tajuddin Ahmad
- Preceded by: Office established
- Succeeded by: Abdul Mannan

1st Minister of Disaster Management and Relief
- In office 10 April 1971 – 16 March 1973
- President: Sheikh Mujibur Rahman; Syed Nazrul Islam (acting); Abu Sayeed Chowdhury
- Prime Minister: Tajuddin Ahmad; Sheikh Mujibur Rahman
- Preceded by: Office established
- Succeeded by: Mizanur Rahman Chowdhury

Personal details
- Born: 26 June 1926 Natore, Bengal, British India
- Died: 3 November 1975 (aged 49) Dacca Central Jail, Dhaka, Bangladesh
- Party: Awami League
- Children: A. H. M. Khairuzzaman Liton
- Occupation: Politician, minister
- Awards: Independence Award

Abul Hasnat Muhammad Qamaruzzaman (Note: Bengali: আবুল হাসনাত মোহাম্মদ কামারুজ্জামান) (26 June 1926 – 3 November 1975) was a Bangladeshi politician, government minister, and one of the founding leaders of Bangladesh. While serving as the Home Minister to Mujibnagar Government, Qamaruzzaman was murdered along with Syed Nazrul Islam, Muhammad Mansur Ali, and Tajuddin Ahmed in the jail killings in Dhaka Central Jail on 3 November 1975 by a group of army officers on the instruction of President Mostaq.

== Early life ==
Qamaruzzaman was born on 26 June 1926 in the city of Bagatipara Upazila, Natore, Bengal (now in Bangladesh). He obtained degrees in economics from the University of Calcutta in 1946, and a law degree from the Rajshahi University in 1956. He began practising after his induction into the Rajshahi District bar association. As a student, Qamaruzzaman became active in the Muslim League and worked for the Pakistan movement.

== Political career ==
Qamaruzzaman joined the Awami League in 1956. He was elected to the National Assembly of Pakistan in 1962, 1965, and again in 1970. He rose to national party leadership posts in the late 1960s. During the Bangladesh Liberation War, Qamaruzzaman served as the minister of relief and rehabilitation in the provisional government of Bangladesh formed at Mujibnagar. After the creation of Bangladesh, he won election to the national parliament from Rajshahi in 1973. He resigned on 18 January 1974 to serve as president of the Awami League. In 1975, Qamaruzzaman was appointed minister of industries and a member of the executive committee of BAKSAL.

== Death and legacy ==
After the assassination of Sheikh Mujibur Rahman on 15 August 1975, Qamaruzzaman was arrested by the regime of the new president, Khondaker Mostaq Ahmad, and imprisoned in the Dhaka Central Jail with Tajuddin Ahmed, Syed Nazrul Islam, and Mansur Ali. These four senior Awami League politicians were killed on 3 November 1975, by army officers who were responsible for Mujib's death. Qamaruzzaman's son, A. H. M. Khairuzzaman Liton, is an Awami League politician and the former mayor of Rajshahi City.
