= Dhaka Central Jail, Keraniganj =

Major prison in Bangladesh

Dhaka Central Jail
- Interactive map of Dhaka Central Jail
- Location: Rajendrapur, Teghoria Union, Keraniganj Upazila, Dhaka District; 23.6604°N 90.3815°E
- Status: Open
- Security class: Maximum
- Capacity: 4590
- Opened: 2016; 10 years ago
- Managed by: Bangladesh Jail

Road located within the premises of the prison

Dhaka Central Jail, Keraniganj is situated in Rajendrapur, Tegharia union, Keraniganj, Bangladesh and was inaugurated on 10 April 2016.

The jail is built on 31 acres of land and can house 4590 prisoners. Prisoners from Old Dhaka Central Jail were shifted to this jail in July 2016. There are two six-storey buildings for the convicts. Each building can accommodate 500 convicts. There are separate buildings for risky inmates and prisoners eligible for division facilities.

Since its opening, the prison has faced several problems including the lack of gas connections (the food had to be cooked by using firewood), poor water connections, and lack of space in the visitor centre.
