= Khondaker Mostaq Ahmad =

President of Bangladesh in 1975

- খন্দকার মোশতাক আহমেদ
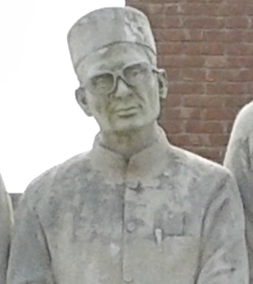

President of Bangladesh
- In office 15 August 1975 – 6 November 1975
- Prime Minister: None
- Preceded by: Sheikh Mujibur Rahman
- Succeeded by: Abu Sadat Mohammad Sayem

Minister of Commerce
- In office 16 March 1973 – 31 May 1975
- Prime Minister: Sheikh Mujibur Rahman
- Preceded by: Abdul Momin Talukdar
- Succeeded by: Ziaur Rahman

Minister of Land Revenue
- In office 12 January 1972 – Unknown
- Prime Minister: Sheikh Mujibur Rahman

1st Minister of Foreign Affairs
- In office 14 April 1971 – 29 December 1971
- Prime Minister: Tajuddin Ahmad
- Preceded by: Position established
- Succeeded by: Abdus Samad Azad

1st Minister of Law, Justice and Parliamentary Affairs
- In office 14 April 1971 – 12 January 1972
- Prime Minister: Tajuddin Ahmad
- Preceded by: Position established
- Succeeded by: Kamal Hossain

Personal details
- Born: 1919 Daudkandi, Bengal, British Raj (now Comilla, Bangladesh)
- Died: 5 March 1996 (aged 77) Dhaka, Bangladesh
- Party: Democratic League (1978–1996)
- Other political affiliations: Bangladesh Krishak Sramik Awami League (1975); Bangladesh Awami League (1971–1975); All-Pakistan Awami League (1949–1971); Pakistan Muslim League (1947–1949); All-India Muslim League (Before 1947)
- Education: University of Dhaka

Khondaker Mostaq Ahmad (Bengali: খন্দকার মুশতাক আহমেদ, romanised: Khandakar Mushtaq Ahmed; 1919 – 5 March 1996) was a Bangladeshi politician. He was the Minister of Commerce in the third Mujib Rahman ministry under President-Prime Minister Sheikh Mujibur Rahman, and assumed the presidency of Bangladesh after the President-Prime Minister's assassination on 15 August 1975. He praised the assassins as "sons of the sun" and put cabinet ministers loyal to Sheikh Mujibur Rahman in jail. On 3 November, he himself was deposed in another coup.

His party failed to gain any significant traction in Bangladeshi politics and never became a major political force.

== Early life ==
Ahmad was born in 1919, into a Bengali Muslim family of Khondakars in the village of Dashpara in Daudkandi, Tipperah district (now Comilla District, Bangladesh). The family was a Pir family, his father Al-Hajj Hazrat Khandaker Kabiruddin Ahmed was considered to be a Muslim saint and was known widely as Pir Sahib. He completed his Bachelor of Laws degree at the University of Dhaka and entered politics in 1942. He was one of the founder joint secretaries of the East Pakistan Awami Muslim League.

== Political career ==
Ahmad was elected a member of the East Pakistan Provincial Assembly in 1954 as a candidate of the United Front. After the central government of Pakistan dissolved the United Front, Ahmad was jailed in 1954 along with other Bengali leaders. He was released in 1955 and elected the chief whip of the United Front parliamentary party. In 1958, with the promulgation of martial law, he was arrested by the regime of Ayub Khan. During the 6 Point Movement, Ahmad was again jailed in 1966. Following his release, Ahmad accompanied Sheikh Mujibur Rahman (then the most senior leader of the Awami League Party) to the all-parties conference called by Ayub Khan in Rawalpindi in 1969. In 1970, he was elected a member of the National Assembly of Pakistan.

=== Government of Bangladesh in exile ===
At the onset of the Bangladesh War of Independence and Mujib's arrest, Ahmad and other Awami League leaders gathered in Mujibnagar, Meherpur to form the Government of Bangladesh in exile. Syed Nazrul Islam served as the acting president while Mujib was declared president, Tajuddin Ahmad was appointed prime minister and Khondakar Mostaq Ahmed was made the foreign minister.

In this capacity, Ahmad was to build international support for the cause of Bangladesh's independence. But his role as the Foreign Minister became controversial as he wanted a peaceful solution, remaining within Pakistan by forming the Bangladesh–Pakistan Confederation. He was sidelined after his manoeuvrings came to light, left out of a visit to the United Nations General Assembly and dismissed by Prime Minister Ahmad shortly before the end of the provisional government, when the war had already ended. He was replaced by Abdus Samad Azad. Zafrullah Chowdhury alleges that Ahmad did not act alone in this regard and that Awami League leaders were involved.

=== Sheikh Mujib administration ===
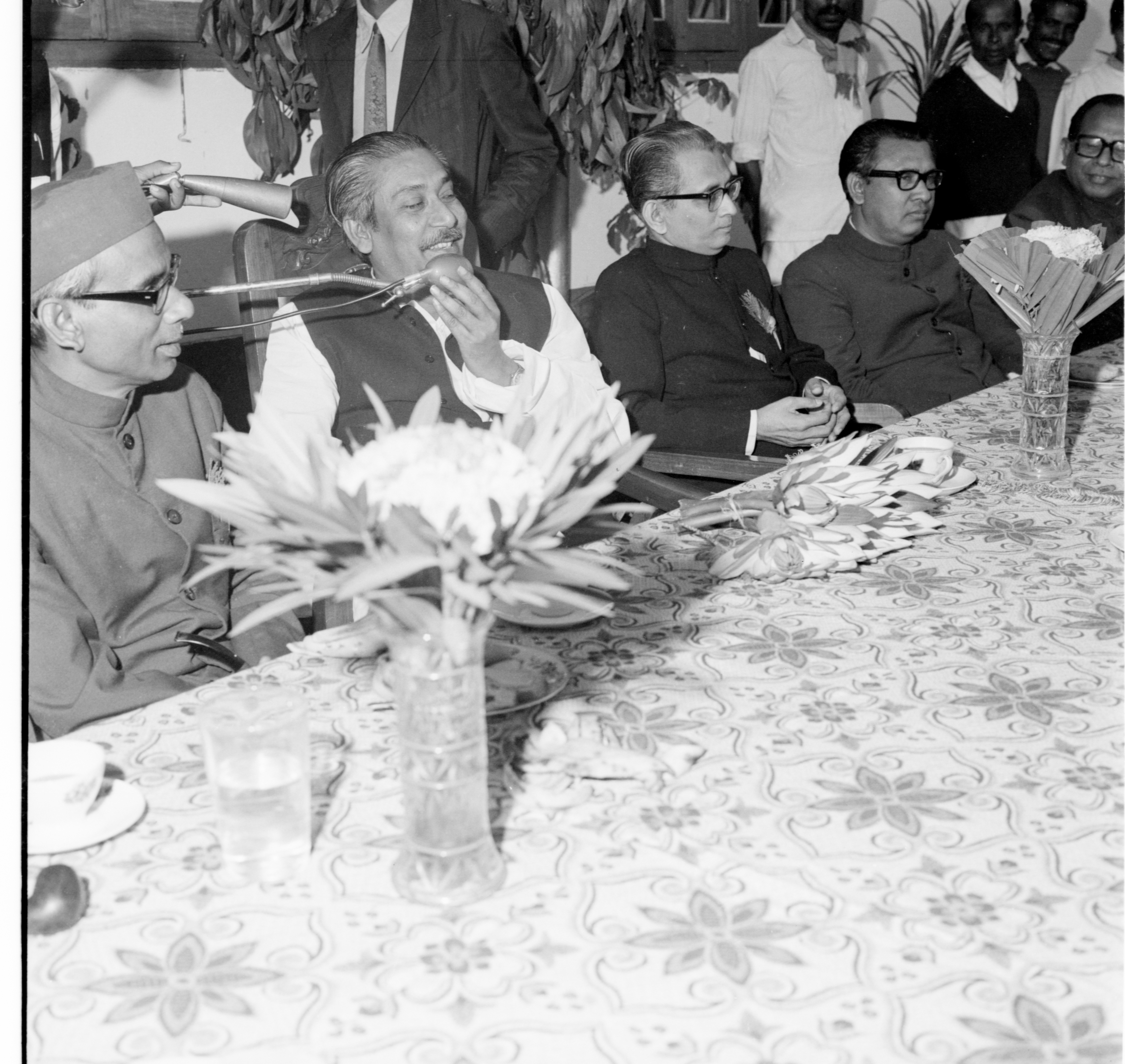
Ahmad with Sheikh Mujib

After the liberation, Ahmad was appointed the Minister of Power, Irrigation and Flood Control in 1972 as part of the Second Sheikh Mujib cabinet. In 1973, he took charge of the Ministry of Commerce in the Third Sheikh Mujib cabinet. He was a member of the executive committee of Bangladesh Krishak Sramik Awami League (BaKSAL). Sheikh Mujibur Rahman introduced a political system often described as "One Party, One Man, One Rule," reflecting the establishment of a centralised authority under the Bangladesh Krishak Sramik Awami League (BAKSAL) in 1975.

=== 1975 Political Crisis and Presidency ===
Sheikh Mujib and his family, except for his two daughters who were in West Germany at the time, were assassinated by a group of army personnel on 15 August.

Ahmad immediately took control of the government, proclaiming himself President. All three services chiefs were dismissed and replaced by next in line seniors. Major General Ziaur Rahman was appointed Chief of Army Staff of the Bangladesh Army, replacing K M Shafiullah. Air Vice Marshal A. K. Khandekar was replaced by AVM M G Ghulam Tawab. Mushtaq reportedly praised the plotters who killed Sheikh Mujibur Rahman calling them Shurjo Shontan (Sons of the Sun). Mushtaq Ahmad also ordered the imprisonment of leaders Syed Nazrul Islam, Tajuddin Ahmad, A. H. M. Qamaruzzaman and Muhammad Mansur Ali. He replaced the national slogan of Joy Bangla with Bangladesh Zindabad slogan and changed the name Bangladesh Betar to 'Radio Bangladesh'. He proclaimed the Indemnity Ordinance, which granted immunity from prosecution to the assassins of Mujib. Mujib's daughters Sheikh Hasina and Sheikh Rehana were barred from returning to Bangladesh from abroad. BAKSAL and pro-Mujib political groups were dissolved.

On 3 November, in what became infamously known as the "Jail Killing Day", the four imprisoned leaders Tajuddin Ahmad, Syed Nazrul Islam, A. H. M. Qamaruzzaman, and Muhammad Mansur Ali, who had refused to co-operate with Mostaq, were killed inside Dhaka Central Jail by a group of army officers on the instruction of President Khondaker Mostaq Ahmad. However, Mushtaq Ahmad was ousted from power on 6 November following a coup on 3 November led by Brigadier Khaled Mosharraf and Colonel Shafat Jamil among others.

=== Formation of the Democratic League ===
Following his removal from office in the 3 November 1975 coup led by Brigadier General Khaled Mosharraf, Mostaq Ahmad was imprisoned. After his release in 1976, he founded a political party named the Democratic League. Later that year, he was arrested for alleged involvement in a conspiracy to overthrow the military government and was convicted in two corruption cases, receiving a five-year prison sentence.

== Later life and legacy ==
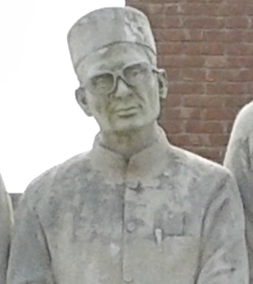
Sculpture of Khondakar Mostaque Ahmad in Mujibnagar, Meherpur

Ahmad was imprisoned by Brigadier General Khaled Mosharraf and later by the Ziaur Rahman administration until 1978. Upon his release, he formed Democratic League and attempted to resuscitate his political career, but to no avail. He spent his last years in Dhaka and died on 5 March 1996.

Ahmad was named in the investigation of the murder of Sheikh Mujib launched in 1996 by his daughter Sheikh Hasina, who had just won the national elections to become Prime Minister of Bangladesh. Hasina blamed Ahmad for her father's death. Due to his death, he was not charged or tried.

== See also ==
- BM Abbas
