= Premiership of Sheikh Mujibur Rahman =

Period of the Government of Bangladesh from 1972 to 1975

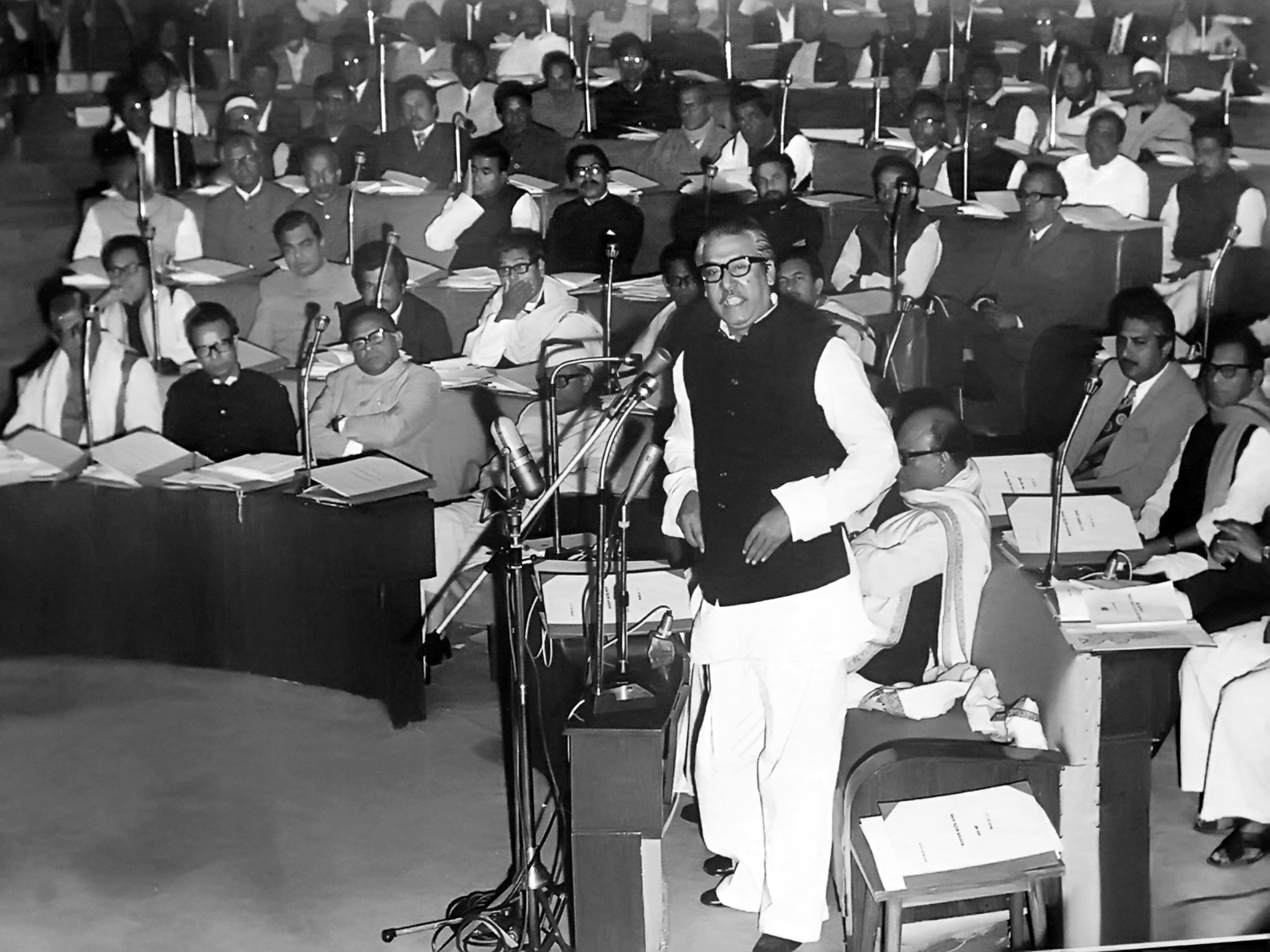
- Rahman addressing in the parliament
- Premiership of Sheikh Mujibur Rahman; 12 January 1972 – 24 January 1975
- President: Abu Sayeed Chowdhury; Mohammad Mohammadullah
- Prime Minister: Himself
- Cabinet: Second Mujib ministry; Third Mujib ministry
- Party: Bangladesh Awami League
- Election: 1970, 1973
- Seat: Ganabhaban

The premiership of Sheikh Mujibur Rahman began on January 12 of 1972 when he was sworn in as the Prime minister after briefly serving as the President after returning from Pakistan's jail on January 10, 1972. Sheikh Mujibur Rahman served as the prime minister of Bangladesh until January 25, 1975, for three years, and later led the parliament to adopt an amendment of the constitution that made him the president of Bangladesh.

Sheikh Mujibur Rahman took charge as the prime minister within a month of Bangladesh's winning freedom from Pakistan after one of the deadliest wars. Bangladesh was plagued with a multitude of problems due to the war and natural calamities after the war. Most of the country's bridges were destroyed during the war and the southern part of the country was yet to recover from the 1970 Bhola Cyclone. Physical assets valuing US$1200 million were destroyed. However, Bangladesh received foreign aid of around US$1900 million from development partners from 1972 to 1975 to address these problems.

Bangladesh introduced four principles under Sheikh Mujib—Democracy, Socialism, Nationalism and Secularism—when the constitution of Bangladesh was adopted by the parliament in November 1972, within a year of independence. To attain the ideas of socialism, Bangladesh nationalized all the major industries and imposed a ceiling for private investments that significantly impacted the growth of enterprises and slowed down the economic activities inside the country. By 1974, the share of customs duty and sales tax in the total tax of Bangladesh fell down to 39%, from 48.8% of 1972. The slowing down of economic activities, politicized rent management and a devastating flood resulted in a deadly famine in 1974 that took the lives of hundreds and thousands of people.

Besides, the law and order situation deteriorated significantly and political killings were prevalent. A special paramilitary unit similar to Gestapo of Hitler, Jatiya Rakkhi Bahini, loyal to Sheikh Mujibur Rahman, was formed to crush dissidents. They were provided with an indemnity to arrest or search any house. Rakkhi Bahini became infamous for extrajudicial killings and enforced disappearances.

Bangladesh was recognized by almost every country by 1975, and became a member of the United Nations, Commonwealth and Non-Aligned Movement, gradually. However, the relationship between the key oil-rich Gulf states, as well as China, was yet to be established.

Sheikh Mujibur Rahman introduced infamous repressive acts as prime minister including the Special Powers Act, 1974. Bangladesh's constitution was amended in 1973 to allow the parliament members to pass preventive detention laws. Despite the initial willingness of the government of Sheikh Mujibur Rahman to try the people involved in war crimes, the government declared a general amnesty in 1974 and allowed some key collaborators to walk free. Bangladesh also reached an agreement with India and Pakistan to allow the Prisoners of War of the Pakistan Army who were involved in gross violation of human rights during the war to return to their country as Pakistan promised to try them if they are found guilty of any offence.

In the last week of December 1974, Bangladesh declared a state of emergency and within a month a new amendment to the constitution was made that transformed Bangladesh from a parliamentary democracy to a presidential system. The amendment indeed, "institutionalized autocracy" and Sheikh Mujibur Rahman immediately became the "unimpeachable" President of Bangladesh replacing the incumbent president Mohammad Mohammadullah. All political parties but BAKSAL, a new form of Awami League, were banned and all but four newspapers were allowed to run with four state-appointed editors, under his Second Revolution theory. This effectively impacted the civil liberties and closed the democratic institutions of Bangladesh.

== Background ==
When Bangladesh's independence struggle started, Sheikh Mujibur Rahman became the most popular leader of the Bengali nationalist movement. After the Agartala Conspiracy Case was filed, his popularity skyrocketed. Riding on the wave of Bengali nationalism, he led the landslide victory of the Awami League in the 1970 Pakistani general election. Awami League won in all but 2 constituencies in East Pakistan, now Bangladesh.

When the Bangladesh Liberation War broke out, Sheikh Mujibur Rahman was arrested in the early hours of the war and was flown to a jail in Pakistan. In his absence, a group of the elected lawmakers from the Awami League rallied behind Tajuddin Ahmed and Syed Nazrul Islam, who formed Bangladesh's provisional government with Sheikh Mujibur Rahman as the president. Tajuddin Ahmed became the prime minister and Syed Nazrul Islam served as the acting president.

=== Homecoming and swearing-in ===
The official declaration of independence by the Provisional Government of Bangladesh, endorsed by lawmakers and the freedom fighters, declared Bangabandhu Sheikh Mujibur Rahman as the president of the republic until a constitution is adopted. However, Awami League has always favoured a Parliamentary System where president holds a titular role. Therefore, after the war ended, when Sheikh Mujibur Rahman returned to the country and took charge as the president and almost immediately adopted the Provisional Constitution of Bangladesh Order, 1972, repealing the effects of Proclamation of Independence Order. The next day he was sworn in as the prime minister of Bangladesh. He appointed a cabinet accordingly on January 12, 1972.

=== Election of 1973 ===
Bangladesh's first government led by Sheikh Mujibur Rahman was composed of the members of parliament who were elected in the 1970 Pakistan elections before the independence. The national assembly was indeed a constituent assembly and after the adoption of the constitution, a new election became imminent. Hence on November 4, 1972, Sheikh Mujibur Rahman declared an election to be held on March 7, 1973. There was a ban on religion-based politics and only a few parties were in the state of running a campaign. Fourteen parties participated in the election with around a thousand candidates. There were 120 independent candidates as well. Sheikh Mujibur Rahman, as the prime minister, had access to every resource of the country. Sheikh Mujibur Rahman addressed 27 rallies between February 13 and February 28, 1973. He was seen campaigning with a helicopter in almost every district while his competitors were struggling to field candidates in such a short time.

There was an election in 288 seats and 11 Awami League candidates were elected unopposed as it was alleged that some of the candidates could not even file their nomination due to intimidation from ruling Awami League leaders. The election was marred with violence and ballot stuffing. Awami League opted for an ‘electoral strategy of overkilling the opposition’ and won 293 seats.

Political scientist Rounaq Jahan opined,

The Awami League followed an electoral strategy of overkilling the opposition. Its policy of putting maximum pressure to win every parliamentary seat virtually wiped out the opposition parties from the parliament. The marginal representation of opposition in parliament had a dysfunctional impact on the fledgling parliamentary system. It diminished the opposition's stake in the system.

The voter turnout was 54.9%, which was slightly larger than that of the 1970 election. After the election, Sheikh Mujibur Rahman was sworn in as the prime minister of Bangladesh on March 16, 1973. A new cabinet was formed with the old-guards of Awami League. Tajuddin Ahmad, A. H. M. Qamaruzzaman, Syed Nazrul Islam, Mansur Ali, Khondaker Mostaq Ahmad and M. A. G. Osmani, all the leaders who served as minister in the Provisional Government of Bangladesh took charges of different ministries. Sheikh Mujib's brother-in-law Abdur Rab Serniabat became the minister of Minister of Power, Flood Control and Irrigation.

== Key policy measures ==
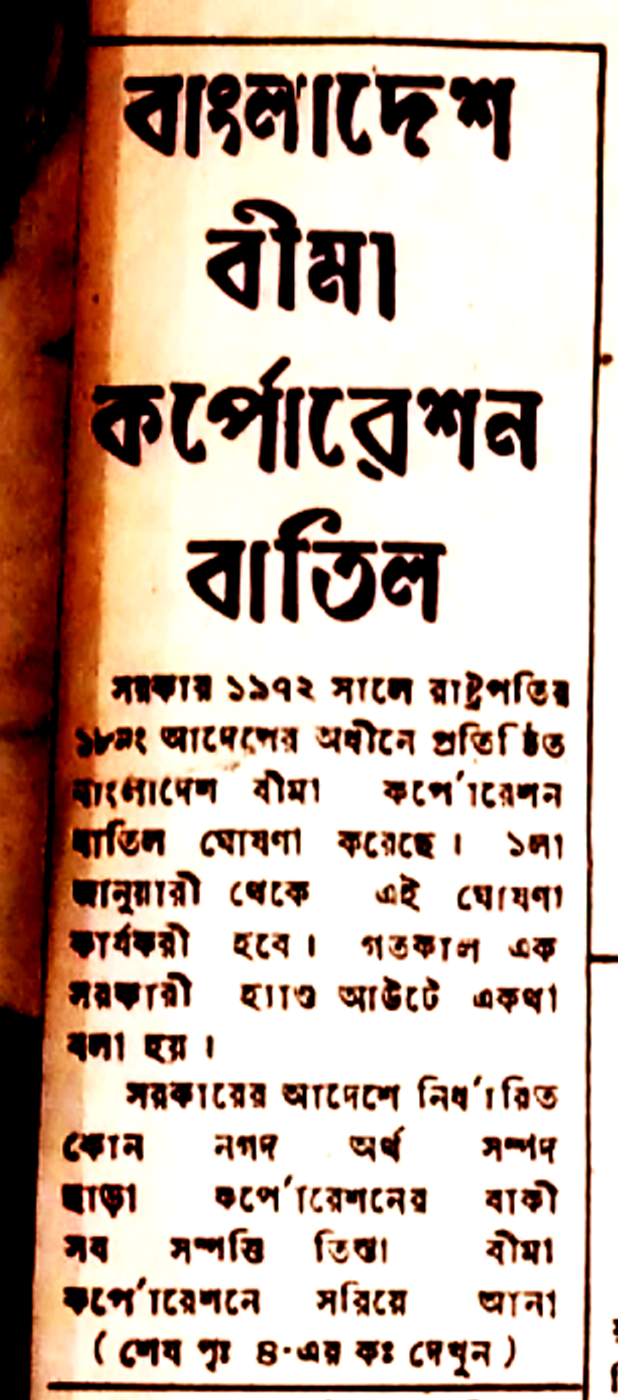
Bangladesh abolished Insurance Corporation

=== Socialist economy ===
Under Sheikh Mujibur Rahman, Bangladesh opted for a socialist economy, commanded by the state. On March 26, 1972, the government decided to nationalize 86% of the country's industrial assets, including 70 jute mills, 72 textile factories, 3 paper mills, 17 sugar mills and 4 major gas fields. In addition to that ceilings were imposed on private investment and ownership of lands. Besides, to support the small farmers, an exemption of taxation was declared for the owners of less than twenty-five of land. The stock market was shut down after the independence and all the banks were nationalized. The government initially imposed a ceiling on salary as well. Bangladesh Bank took an expansionary fiscal policy to match the socialist economic ideas that the government was pushing.

The wholesale nationalisation paved the way for corrupt rent-seeking, however. Patronage became the chief consideration in the distribution of managerial jobs and licenses for industries. Instead of capabilities, loyalties became the parameter for distributing crucial licenses for trading and enterprises. On the other hand, the local entrepreneurs whose factories were nationalised fell into a predicament since they were left with no assets. Latifur Rahman, the founder of Transcom Group, who used to own a jute mill which was taken away in 1972, even had to bring a ceiling fan from his home and hire furniture to start his office after the wholesale nationalization of industries.

=== Reconstruction and rehabilitation ===
The war of 1971 and the cyclone of 1970 practically destroyed a huge amount of infrastructures that had to be rebuilt. Bangladesh urged its friends and the international community to contribute to the reconstruction of the country. The Soviet Union sent 800 mariners to clear off the mines from Chattagram Sea Port to make it usable and by 1974, the port was ready to be used. India sent some officials in early 1972 to run the country as Bangladesh lacked efficient professionals. India also helped Bangladesh to mend some roads and bridges.

The United States, despite their role in supporting Pakistan during the liberation war, provided a sizeable amount of food grains and aid equivalent to US$824 million. USD 1.4 million was provided to the Cholera Research Laboratory and a developmental loan of US$30 million was approved in January 1975 to buy seeds and fertilizers. USAID provided funds for the coastal embankment project and the repair and overhaul of the Siddhirganj Power Plant which was damaged during the war. The World Bank agreed to sponsor the development of the Ashuganj Fertilizer Factory, a project that was partially supported by the United States. The roads and bridges between Dhaka and Aricha were repaired with U.S. support.

The Sheikh Mujib administration enforced a decree to restore the judicial activities in the country in January 1972. The government also waived all due land taxes for cultivable lands to revive the rural economy at the earliest. In addition to that, the government waived housing taxes in urban areas to expedite the rebuilding of damaged infrastructures. The Trading Corporation of Bangladesh was established in the same year to conduct trading activities. The rebuilding of schools and educational institutions started after the war with donors' support. A project was taken to buy and print textbooks and reference books.

To rehabilitate the freedom fighters, Bangladesh Freedom Fighter Welfare Trust was founded in 1972. A rehabilitation centre was opened in Mohammadpur, Dhaka.

=== Secular education ===
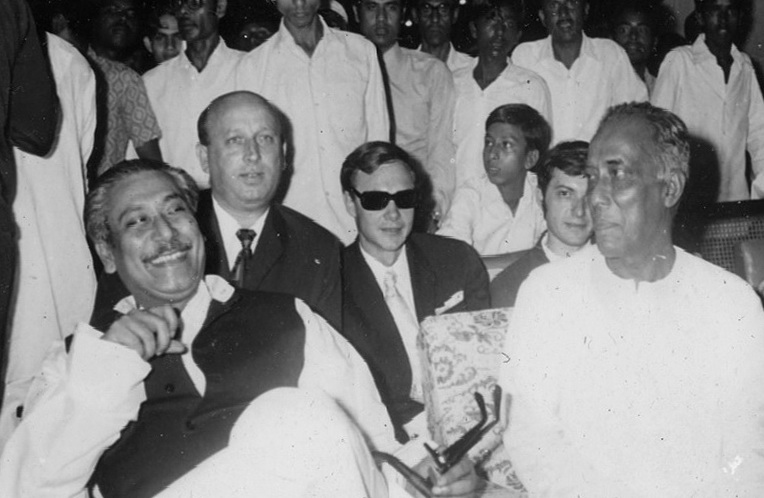
Bangabandhu Sheikh Mujibur Rahman in a public meeting

Prior to the independence, during Pakistan days, Islam was an integral part of the education system and a compulsory subject was introduced in the textbooks on Islamic ideas to educate the students on Islamic values. Bangladesh which was a part of Pakistan had these subjects and topics within the education system. After the war, when Bangladesh adopted secularism as state principle, an independent commission was founded under prominent scientist Dr. Muhammad Qudrat-i-Khuda. The Qudrat-i-Khuda education commission proposed to introduce secular education and separate religious studies from the education system. The commission also suggested putting emphasis on technical and stipend-based education. The government acted accordingly to introduce a secular education system across the country.

The decision however was highly unpopular. According to a public opinion survey, secular education was acceptable to about 21% of the most educated section of the people of Bangladesh. About 75% opined that religious education should be an integral part of general education.

== Domestic affairs ==
=== Economic management ===
As a newly independent country, Bangladesh was facing several macroeconomic challenges right after independence. Sheikh Mujibur Rahman appointed Tajuddin Ahmad to fight these challenges. Besides, the Planning Commission was established with prominent economist Nurul Islam as its deputy commissioner in February 1972. The Planning Commission submitted a strategy for development as First Five Year Plan in tandem with the Socialist Economic goal of the government.

==== Blanket nationalization ====
As most of Bangladesh's industries were previously owned by non-Bengalis who left during the war, the government and the planning commission decided to nationalize the industries to restructure “property relations by placing the means of production under the ownership of the people.” As a result, within a year, all large industries, or the industries with assets of over BDT 1.5 million, were nationalized overnight. The share of the state in the ownership of all industrial assets went up to 92% from 34% and the share of the private sector came down to only 8% from 66%. Due to the wholesale nationalization, many Bengali industrialists had to lose their industries.

The policy of nationalization centralized the economic activities and the government had the ultimate authority to give away the permits and licenses for different supplies, which included fertilizer, pumps, food grains etc. This policy created multiple middlemen in the system and these middlemen sold and resold the permits resulting in inflation. The cost of living jumped from BDT 208 in January 1972 to taka 297 in October of the same year.

==== Ceiling on investment ====
The government decided to impose a ceiling of 2.5 million BDT on private investment and introduced strict conditions for foreign investors. According to the government's policy statement of 1972, foreign private enterprises were allowed to collaborate with domestic private enterprises only in licenses and patents, but without equity participation. These measures discouraged private entrepreneurs and investors to invest in Bangladesh.

==== Mismanagement of industries ====
With the absence of the non-Bengali industrialists who used to own the major industries and the introduction of new regulations, intense competition between the different factions to expropriate the nationalized industries emerged. This created chaos and resulted in violence and economic mismanagement. Jute, which used to be the major source of foreign remittance before the war, was no more profitable industry. Industrial output in 1972-73 was 30% lower than the normal output of 1969–70, and exports in 1972-73 were estimated to be much lower than the level achieved in 1969–70. The Annual Plan published by the government of Bangladesh argued that the shortfalls in the economy and the high prices are largely the result of inefficient management, which included a lack of coordination labour-management problems and the creation of multiple middlemen in the market.

=== Human rights situation ===
After the independence, although a section of freedom fighters surrendered their weapon, a number of them did not. These weapons were used for robbery and violence. Organized crime and political killings were on the rise. The capacity of the police force to confront the criminals shrunk after the war and there were organized robberies at a significant amount of police stations. Besides, some of these criminals had the blessings of local Awami League leaders which helped them to stay at large.

In this circumstance, to reduce crime and utilize the trained freedom fighters for the greater good of the nation, Jatiya Rakkhi Bahini was established in 1972. This force was composed of the Awami League loyalists and effectively became a private army of Sheikh Mujibur Rahman and the Awami League. The training and deployment of the force were supervised by officials from the Indian Army. The members of the force, known as Rakkhis, became extremely violent in crushing the dissenters and got involved in criminal activities. Jasad and some leftist parties who were opposing the Sheikh Mujib government claimed to have lost thousands of their supporters and activists in the anti-terrorism drive of Rakkhi Bahini.

Jatiya Rakkhi Bahini or JRB in short opted for brutal measures to oppress the opposition party men, irrespective of their gender. They were accused of torture, rape, enforced disappearance and extrajudicial killing. The Sheikh Mujib government passed the most controversial Special Powers Act 1974 that provided the law enforcement agencies, especially the JRB an absolute power to detain and torture any citizen without any charge or trial for an indefinite time. Amnesty International recorded the imprisonment of 2000 political prisoners from 1973 to 1974. JRB, or Rakkhi Bahini, was found involved in the enforced disappearance of Shahjahan, a teenager. A supreme court judgment by Justice Debesh Bhattacharya criticized the misconducts of Rakkhi Bahini. The government of Sheikh Mujibur Rahman soon made an amendment in the Jatiya Rakkhi Bahini Act that endowed them with very wide powers of arrest and detention, and its members were allowed immunity for their actions from scrutiny by the courts.

=== Corruption and nepotism ===
Though Sheikh Mujibur Rahman stayed incorruptible, his tenure as Prime Minister was criticized for nepotism and favouritism, as many of his relatives and loyal supporters got key positions in the government, key organizations and administration. Abdur Rab Serniabat, his brother-in-law and little-known politician from Barishal was appointed as the Minister for Land Revenue in his cabinet. Mujib's other brother-in-law ATM Syed Hossain, who was just a section officer before independence, was promoted to Additional Secretary of the government after the war. Gazi Golam Mostafa, a close associate of Sheikh Mujibur Rahman became the chief of Bangladesh's Red Cross.

Among others, his nephew Sheikh Mani, a former student leader and a young journalist, established a media empire after the independence thanks to the government advertisements. He grabbed multiple properties in the capital forcefully including a printing press.

Besides, the rampant corruption by Awami League leaders and activists was highly criticized. An article in Far Eastern Economic Review read,

Bangladeshis had by this time, begun to consider that the corruption and malpractices and plunder of national wealth had reached “unprecedented” levels.

Sheikh Mujibur Rahman himself admitted the prevalence of corruption in the country in multiple speeches. However, he did little to rectify it. Prominent journalist Salil Tripathi interviewed Monwarul Islam, Sheikh Mujib's political secretary in 1974 who was once sent to look into the allegations of corruption by Sheikh Mujibur Rahman. When he returned with the stories of rampant corruption by Awami League men, Mujib brushed off his reports on the corrupt practices of his supporters. According to Monwarul Islam, Mujib said:

Listen, when I started my party, I could not get brilliant students like you to come join my party. You were too busy pursuing your career in civil service. And I had with me only homeless urchins. Isn't it natural that should engage in such activities when they are in power?

He said this not in a tone of levity, but of resignation, implying it had to be tolerated. This eventually patronized corruption at all levels.

In addition to nepotism and favouritism, the nationalization of the industrial sector and distribution channels of key resources created scope for massive corruption. The MPs used their party leverage to get access to the government-controlled resources and became the major channels of distribution in the districts.

=== Famine ===
Bangladesh experienced the first famine within three years of independence in 1974 after a portion of crops was destroyed due to flood. But the economic mismanagement, corruption and governance failure led to the loss of life of hundreds and thousands of people, if not millions. After the flood of the monsoon, June to July, stories of famine started to appear on the newspapers but the government formally declared that the country is facing a famine in late September.

Situation worsened within a month and local people started gruel kitchens initially to feed the poor. Government decision to open gruel kitchens came in October. A total of 5,862 kitchens were opened that served around four million people in the most affected areas in the northern part of Bangladesh. The gruel kitchens were closed by the end of November.

The government estimated around 26,000 deaths as a result of the famine which is far lower than the estimates of researchers and journalists. Nobel laureate economist Amartya Sen in his article claimed that 80 to 100 thousands persons died of starvation and malnutrition in 2 to 3 months in the Rangpur district alone. Bangladesh had 19 districts that time and apart from the Chattagram hill tracts, all the districts were affected by the famine. Researcher Dr. Mohiuddin Alamgir has put the death toll around a million, between August 1974 to February 1975. Apart from these estimates, Dr. Muhammed Muqtada suggested that the number of death is at least 250,000 and a BIGD survey of gruel kitchen showed 3.17% people who came to the gruel kitchen died of starvation and malnutrition. Farmers were the biggest victim of the famine, who constituted 38.7% of the total visitors of the gruel kitchens, followed by agricultural and other labourers.

Professor Amartya Sen did an extensive research on the famine of Bangladesh and explained the context and reasons of the famine in his articles and two famous books- Poverty and Famines: An Essay on Entitlement and Deprivation and Development as Freedom. Professor Sen proved that the famine was not a result of food availability decline (FAD), indeed, in 1974 Bangladesh enjoyed a year of peak availability of food grains compared to the other years of the first half of the 1970s. At one hand, Rangpur, Mymensingh, Dinajpur, and Sylhet were the most affected regions of famine while on the other hand, three of these four districts saw substantial growth in terms of rice production and food availability, compared to the other districts.

One key reason of the famine was the fall of rice exchange rate, a major source of income for the farmers and agricultural workers, after the flood. The flood and economic mismanagement also cut down the employment. On contrary, the price of rice, the staple food of the country, was experiencing unprecedented rise because of the "inflationary forces operating on the rice market" who "started pushing rice prices up very sharply much before the floods hit" and indeed, there was about a 50 percent rise between January and April in 1974, much before the famine started.

Dr. Amartya Sen explained:

Thus, while floods were associated with the Bangladesh famine and played the part of disrupting the labor market as well as leading to some loss of crops by farmers and consequent destitution, the forces that wreaked havoc must be traced in part to macroeconomic factors operating on the economy of Bangladesh.

Bangladesh in 1974 was a socialist economy and the market was controlled by the state, through the people close to the government, mostly Awami League leaders, who owned the crucial permits of food grains trade. Besides, Bangladesh's Red Cross operations were led by a corrupt individual and a key leader of Awami League, Gazi Golam Mostafa. He was accused of misappropriating the resources that were crucial to avoid the famine.

=== Press freedom ===
During the Sheikh Mujibur Rahman's premiership, press freedom in Bangladesh was seriously disrupted on a number of occasions and some prominent journalists were detained for publishing news. In 1973, the government introduced The Printing Presses and Publications (Declaration and Registration) Act, 1973. The act gave immense power to the bureaucrats to control the publication of newspapers and magazines.

Abdus Salam, the editor of The Observer, lost his job after writing an editorial titled "The supreme test" with a call to form a unity government in the post-independence Bangladesh, in 1972. Later in 1973, publication of The Holiday, a magazine with wide coverage edited by A.Z.M. Enayetullah Khan was suspended for two months under Press and Publication Act. In the same year, declaration of Haq Kotha was cancelled as it was highly critical of Sheikh Mujib regime. In 1974, after the Ramna massacre that claimed around fifty lives, police arrested the editor of Gonokontho, Al Mahmud from his home in the midnight and blocked the circulation of the newspaper as it was sympathetic to Jasad.

== Legacy ==
Sheikh Mujibur Rahman became the prime minister of Bangladesh during a difficult time after a deadly war.

In an editorial written after Sheikh Mujibur Rahman's takeover of presidency, The New York Times termed Bangladesh as One Man's Basket Case and opined,

The corruption, incompetence and indifference which the former Prime Minister and newly proclaimed President assails, and which have driven foreign relief officials to despair, are centered in the Sheik's own party, to which he has assigned an exclusive role in a one‐party state. Primary responsibility for his party's dismal performance must be assigned to the Sheik himself.

His premiership was compared to the rule of a village headman running the country with his relatives and favourites. After his death, the U.S. ambassador in Bangladesh claimed that during his last days he "began to suffer the classic paranoia of the despot".

Indeed, he made a comment after assuming absolute power to local newsmen, reflecting on his struggle to build the newly independent nation:

Maybe it takes one man to lead this people to independence and another to build that nation afterward.

== See also ==
- Presidency of Ziaur Rahman – Period of Government of Bangladesh from 1977 to 1981
- Premiership of Sheikh Hasina – Period of the Government of Bangladesh from 1996 to 2001 and 2009 to 2024
- Premiership of Khaleda Zia – Period of the Government of Bangladesh from 1991 to 1996 and 2001 to 2006
