= Bangladesh Krishak Sramik Awami League =

Sole ruling party of Bangladesh (Jan–Aug 1975)

Bangladesh Krishak Sramik Awami League বাংলাদেশ কৃষক শ্রমিক আওয়ামী লীগ
- Abbreviation: BaKSAL
- Leader: Sheikh Mujibur Rahman
- Founder: Sheikh Mujibur Rahman
- Founded: 24 February 1975
- Banned: 30 August 1975
- Merger of: AL; CPB; NAP(M); BNL; PCJSS; JGU
- Succeeded by: AL; CPB; NAP(M); BNL; PCJSS; JGU
- Headquarters: Dacca, Bangladesh
- Student wing: Jatiya Chhatra League
- Youth wing: Jatiya Jubo League
- Women's wing: Jatiya Mohila League
- Peasants wing: Jatiya Krishak League
- Trade union: Jatiya Sramik League
- Armed wing: Jatiya Rakkhi Bahini (de facto)
- Ideology: Mujibism; Second Revolution; Economic nationalism
- Opponents: JaSaD; PBSP; NAP(B)

The Bangladesh Krishak Sramik Awami League (Bengali: বাংলাদেশ কৃষক শ্রমিক আওয়ামী লীগ, lit. 'Bangladesh Farmers Workers People's League'), abbreviated as BaKSAL, was the sole legal ruling party of Bangladesh from January to August 1975.

The party comprised politicians from the Awami League, the Communist Party of Bangladesh, the National Awami Party (Muzaffar), Bangladesh National League, Jatiya Ganamukti Union, and Parbatya Chattagram Jana Samhati Samiti. The party advocated for economic nationalism as a part of reforms under the theory of the Second Revolution, which BaKSAL worked to achieve the objectives of.

The party was founded on 25 January 1975 by Sheikh Mujibur Rahman following the Fourth Amendment to the constitution. A presidential order also outlawed all political parties other than BaKSAL, creating a state of emergency and obligating other parties to join the front. After the assassination of Sheikh Mujibur Rahman, BaKSAL was banned on 30 August 1975.

== Background ==
The Awami League, under the leadership of Sheikh Mujibur Rahman, won a landslide victory in the 1973 general election. However, Mujibur had difficulties with fighting corruption in his own government, and the increase in leftism caused by the Jatiya Samajtantrik Dal. In the face of growing unrest, on 28 December 1974, Rahman declared a state of emergency. On 25 January 1975, he pushed the Fourth Amendment to the constitution through Jatiya Sangsad, which was passed in the Parliament unanimously. It dissolved all political parties, including the ruling party, the Awami League, and gave Rahman the exclusive authority to form BaKSAL, which would become the "national party" of Bangladesh.

== Formation ==
BaKSAL was formed on 24 February 1975. All MPs and political parties were required to join the party; any MP who missed a parliamentary session, abstained, or failed to vote with the party would lose their seat. As a result, most Awami League politicians and others from different parties joined BaKSAL; however, the Jatiya Samajtantrik Dal, Proletarian Party of East Bengal, Communist Party of East Bengal (Marxist–Leninist), East Pakistan Communist Party, and Bangladesh Communist Party (Leninist) did not join. Civilian government employees, professionals, and trade union leaders were also compelled to join the party.

President Mujibur Rahman, BaKSAL's chairman, appointed a fifteen-member executive committee, a 120-member central committee, and five front organizations, namely, Jatiya Krishak League, Jatiya Sramik League, Jatiya Mahila League, Jatiya Juba League, and Jatiya Chhatra League for peasants, workers, women, youth, and students, respectively, for the party. All members of the executive committee and central committee were appointed as ministers.

=== Executive committee ===
1. Sheikh Mujibur Rahman (chairman)
2. Syed Nazrul Islam (vice-chairman)
3. Muhammad Mansur Ali (secretary general)
4. Abul Hasnat Muhammad Qamaruzzaman
5. Abdul Mannan
6. Khondaker Mostaq Ahmad
7. Abdul Malek Ukil
8. Prof.M. Yousuf Ali
9. Manaranjan Dhar
10. Muzaffar Ahmed Chowdhury
11. Sheikh Abdul Aziz
12. Mohiuddin Ahmed
13. Gazi Golam Mostafa
14. Zillur Rahman
15. Sheikh Fazlul Haque Mani
16. Abdur Razzaq

=== Central Committee ===
1. Sheikh Mujibur Rahman
2. Syed Nazrul Islam
3. Muhammad Mansur Ali
4. Abdul Mannan
5. Abdul Malik Ukil
6. Khondaker Mostaq Ahmad
7. A.H.M Kamaruzzaman
8. Kazi Linchon
9. Mahmudullah
10. Abdus Samad Azad
11. M. Yousuf Ali
12. Phani Bhushan Majumder
13. Kamal Hossain
14. Muhammad Sohrab Hossain
15. Abdur Rab Serniabat
16. Manaranjan Dhar
17. Abdul Matin
18. Asaduzzanan
19. Md Korban Ali
20. Dr. Azizul Rahman Mallik
21. Dr. Muzaffar Ahmed Chowdhury
22. Tofael Ahmed
23. Shah Moazzam Hossain
24. Abdul Momin Talukdar
25. Dewan Farid Gazi
26. Professor Nurul Islam Choudhry
27. Taheruddin Thakur
28. Moslemuddin Khan
29. Professor Abu Sayeed
30. Nurul Islam Manzur
31. KM Obaidur Rahman
32. Dr. Khitish Chandra Mandal
33. Reazuddin Ahmad
34. M. Baitullah
35. Rahul Quddus (secretary)
36. Zillur Rahman
37. Mohiuddin Ahmad MP
38. Sheikh Fazlul Haque Mani
39. Abdur Razzaq
40. Sheikh Shahidul Islam
41. Anwar Choudhry
42. Syeda Sajeda Chowdhury
43. Taslima Abed
44. Abdur Rahim
45. Abdul Awal
46. Lutfur Rahman
47. A.K. Muzibur Rahman
48. Dr. Mofiz Choudhry
49. Dr. Alauddin Ahammad
50. Dr. Ahsanul Haq
51. Raushan Ali
52. Azizur Rahman Akkas
53. Sheikh Abdul Aziz
54. Salahuddin Yusuf
55. Michael Sushil Adhikari
56. Kazi Abdul Hakim
57. Mollah Jalaluddin
58. Shamsuddin Mollah
59. Gour Chandra Bala
60. Gazi Ghulam Mustafa
61. Shamsul Haq
62. Shamsuzzoha
63. Rafiqueuddin Bhuiya
64. Syed Ahmad
65. Shamsur Rahman Khan Shahjahan
66. Nurul Haq
67. Kazi Zahirul Qayyum
68. Capt.(Retd) Sujjat Ali
69. M.R. Siddiqui
70. MA Wahab
71. Chittaranjan Sutar,
72. Sayeda Razia Banu
73. Ataur Rahman Khan
74. Khandakar Muhammad Illyas
75. Mong Pru Saire
76. Professor Muzaffar Ahmed Chowdhury
77. Ataur Rahman
78. Pir Habibur Rahman
79. Syed Altaf Hossain
80. Muhammad Farhad
81. Matia Chowdhury
82. Hazi Danesh
83. Taufiq Inam (secretary)
84. Nurul Islam (secretary)
85. Fayezuddin Ahmed (secretary)
86. Mahbubur Rahman (secretary)
87. Abdul Khaleque
88. Muzibul Haq (secretary)
89. Abdur Rahim (secretary)
90. Moinul Islam (secretary)
91. Sayeeduzzaman (secretary)
92. Anisuzzaman (secretary)
93. Dr. A. Sattar (secretary)
94. M.A Samad (secretary)
95. Abu Tahir (secretary)
96. Al Hossaini (secretary)
97. Dr Tajul Hossain (secretary)
98. Motiur Rahman. Chairman of Trading Corporation of Bangladesh
99. Maj. Gen K.M. Safiullah
100. Air Vice Marshal Abdul Karim Khandker
101. Commodore M.H. Khan
102. Maj Gen. Khalilur Rahman
103. A.K. Naziruddin Ahmed
104. Dr. Abdul Matin Chowdhury
105. Dr. Mazharul Islam
106. Dr. Sramul Haq
107. Badal Ghosh
108. ATM Syed Hossain
109. Nurul Islam
110. Dr. Nilima Ibrahim
111. Dr. Nurul Islam PG Hospital
112. Obaidul Huq Editor Observer
113. Anwar Hossain Manju Editor Ittefaq
114. Mizanur Rahman Editor Bangladesh Press International
115. Manawarul Islam
116. Abu Thaer Bhuiyan
117. Auritro Shayel
118. Brig. A. N. M. Nuruzzaman DG Jatiya Rakkhi Bahini
119. Kamruzzaman teachers Association
120. Dr. Mazhar Ali Kadri

== Legacy ==
In the 1974 Far Eastern Economic Review, Lawrence Lifschultz wrote how Bangladeshis thought that "the corruption and malpractices and plunder of national wealth" were "unprecedented" during Mujibur's governance.

In 2017, the Supreme Court of Bangladesh denounced BaKSAL for "transforming the Constitution beyond any resemblance with the original. Part VIA was incorporated prescribing that there would be only one political party in the State, thereby rendering a severe blow to the democratic set up of the Constitution and paved the way for military dictatorship. The parliamentary form of government was replaced".

Though BaKSAL was dissolved in 1975, another party participated in the 1986 and 1991 general elections in the same name; in 1986, the party's symbol was a boat, while it was a bicycle in 1991. The party acted independently until the 1990s, when almost all of its party leaders left the organization to join the Awami League.
