= Fourth Mujib ministry =

Bangladeshi Government after the Second Revolution

- 4th Council of Ministers of the People's Republic of Bangladesh
- 25 January 1975–15 August 1975
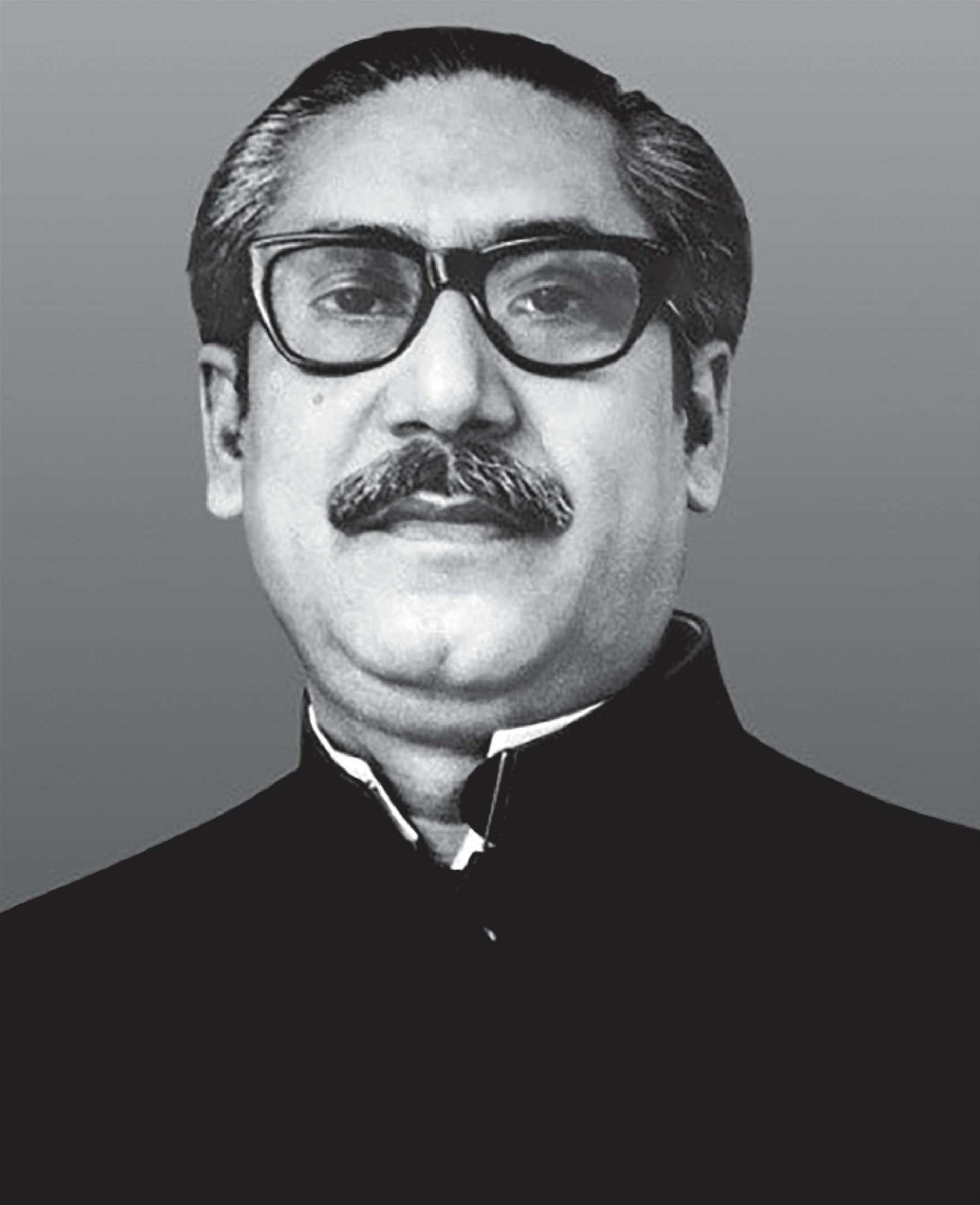
- Prime Minister Sheikh Mujibur Rahman
- Date formed: 25 January 1975
- Date dissolved: 15 August 1975

People and organisations
- President: Sheikh Mujibur Rahman
- Vice-President: Syed Nazrul Islam
- Member party: Bangladesh Krishak Sramik Awami League
- Status in legislature: Dominant-party majority
- Opposition party: -

History
- Election: 1973
- Outgoing election: -
- Legislature terms: 1st Jatiya Sangsad
- Predecessor: Mujib III
- Successor: Mostaq

The fourth Mujib ministry was formed on 25 January 1975 after the Fourth Amendment of the constitution when Bangladesh converted into a Presidential form of government from a Parliamentary system.

== Members ==
The following lists the president(s), the vice-president(s) and the special assistant(s) to the president:

Cabinet members
Portfolio	Minister	Took office	Left office	
President and also in-charge of꞉: Presidential Secretariat; Cabinet Division; Establishment Division; Presidential Division; Ministry of Defence	Sheikh Mujibur Rahman	25 January 1975	15 August 1975 (assassinated)	BAKSAL
Vice President and also in-charge of: Ministry of Planning; Bangladesh Planning Commission	Syed Nazrul Islam	26 January 1975	15 August 1975	BAKSAL

=== Cabinet ministers ===
Cabinet members
Portfolio	Minister	Took office	Left office	
Prime Minister and also in-charge of꞉: Ministry of Home Affairs; Ministry of Communications; Railway Division; Roads, Road Transport, Towns and Seaports Division; Ministry of Posts, Telegraphs and Telecommunications; Ministry of Shipping, Inland Navigation and Civil Aviation	Muhammad Mansur Ali	26 January 1975	15 August 1975	BAKSAL
Ministry of Commerce: Foreign Trade Division; Internal Trade Division	Khondaker Mostaq Ahmad	26 January 1975	15 August 1975	BAKSAL
Ministry of Industries: Industry Division; State Industries Division	Abul Hasnat Muhammad Qamaruzzaman	26 January 1975	15 August 1975	BAKSAL
Ministry of Land Administration and Land Reforms	Muhammadullah	26 January 1975	15 August 1975	BAKSAL
Ministry of Agriculture	Abdus Samad Azad	26 January 1975	15 August 1975	BAKSAL
Ministry of Labor and Social Welfare also in-charge of: Cultural Affairs and Sports Division	Muhammad Yusuf Ali	26 January 1975	15 August 1975	BAKSAL
Ministry of Local Government, Rural Development and Co-operatives	Phani Bhushan Majumder	26 January 1975	15 August 1975	BAKSAL
Ministry of Foreign Affairs; Ministry of Petroleum and Mineral Resources	Kamal Hossain	26 January 1975	15 August 1975	BAKSAL
Ministry of Works, Housing and Urban Development: Works and Housing Division; Urban Development Division	Muhammad Sohrab Hossain	26 January 1975	15 August 1975	BAKSAL
Ministry of Health and Family Planning: Health Services Division; Family Planning Division	Abdul Mannan	26 January 1975	15 August 1975	BAKSAL
Ministry of Flood Control, Water Resources Development and Power; Flood Control and Water Resources Division; Power Division; Ministry of Forests, Fisheries and Animal Husbandry	Abdur Rab Serniabat	26 January 1975	15 August 1975	BAKSAL
Ministry of Law, Justice and Parliamentary Affairs: Legislative and Parliamentary Affairs Division; Law and Justice Division	Manoranjan Dhar	26 January 1975	15 August 1975	BAKSAL
Ministry of Food and Civil Supplies; Ministry of Relief and Rehabilitation	Abdul Momin	26 January 1975	15 August 1975	BAKSAL
Ministry of Jute: Jute Division; Jute Industry Division	Asaduzzaman Khan	26 January 1975	15 August 1975	BAKSAL
Ministry of Information and Radio	Md Korban Ali	26 January 1975	15 August 1975	BAKSAL
Ministry of Finance	Azizur Rahman Mallick	26 January 1975	15 August 1975	BAKSAL
Ministry of Education and Scientific, Technical Research and Atomic Energy: Education Division; Scientific, Technical Research and Atomic Energy Division	Muzaffar Ahmed Chowdhury	26 January 1975	15 August 1975	BAKSAL

== State ministers ==
Cabinet members
Portfolio	Minister	Took office	Left office	Party	Ref
Ministry of Communications	Nurul Islam Manzur	26 January 1975	21 July 1975	BAKSAL	
Ministry of Posts, Telegraphs and Telecommunications	KM Obaidur Rahman	26 January 1975	15 August 1975	BAKSAL	
Ministry of Commerce	Dewan Farid Gazi	26 January 1975	15 August 1975	BAKSAL	
Ministry of Industries	Nurul Islam Chowdhury	26 January 1975	19 May 1975	BAKSAL	
Ministry of Defence	Nurul Islam Chowdhury	19 May 1975	15 August 1975	BAKSAL	
Ministry of Local Government, Rural Development and Co-operatives	Abdul Momin Talukdar	26 January 1975	15 August 1975	BAKSAL	
Ministry of Forests, Fisheries and Animal Husbandry	Md. Reazuddin Ahmed	26 January 1975	15 August 1975	BAKSAL	
Ministry of Relief and Rehabilitation	Khitish Chandra Mondal	26 January 1975	15 August 1975	BAKSAL	
Ministry of Jute	Moslem Uddin Khan	26 January 1975	15 August 1975	BAKSAL	
Ministry of Information and Radio	Taheruddin Thakur	26 January 1975	15 August 1975	BAKSAL	
