= Minister of Education (Bangladesh) =

Minister of Education of The People's Republic of Bangladesh

People's Republic of Bangladesh Minister of Education
- বাংলাদেশের শিক্ষামন্ত্রী
- Government Seal of Bangladesh

- Flag of Bangladesh

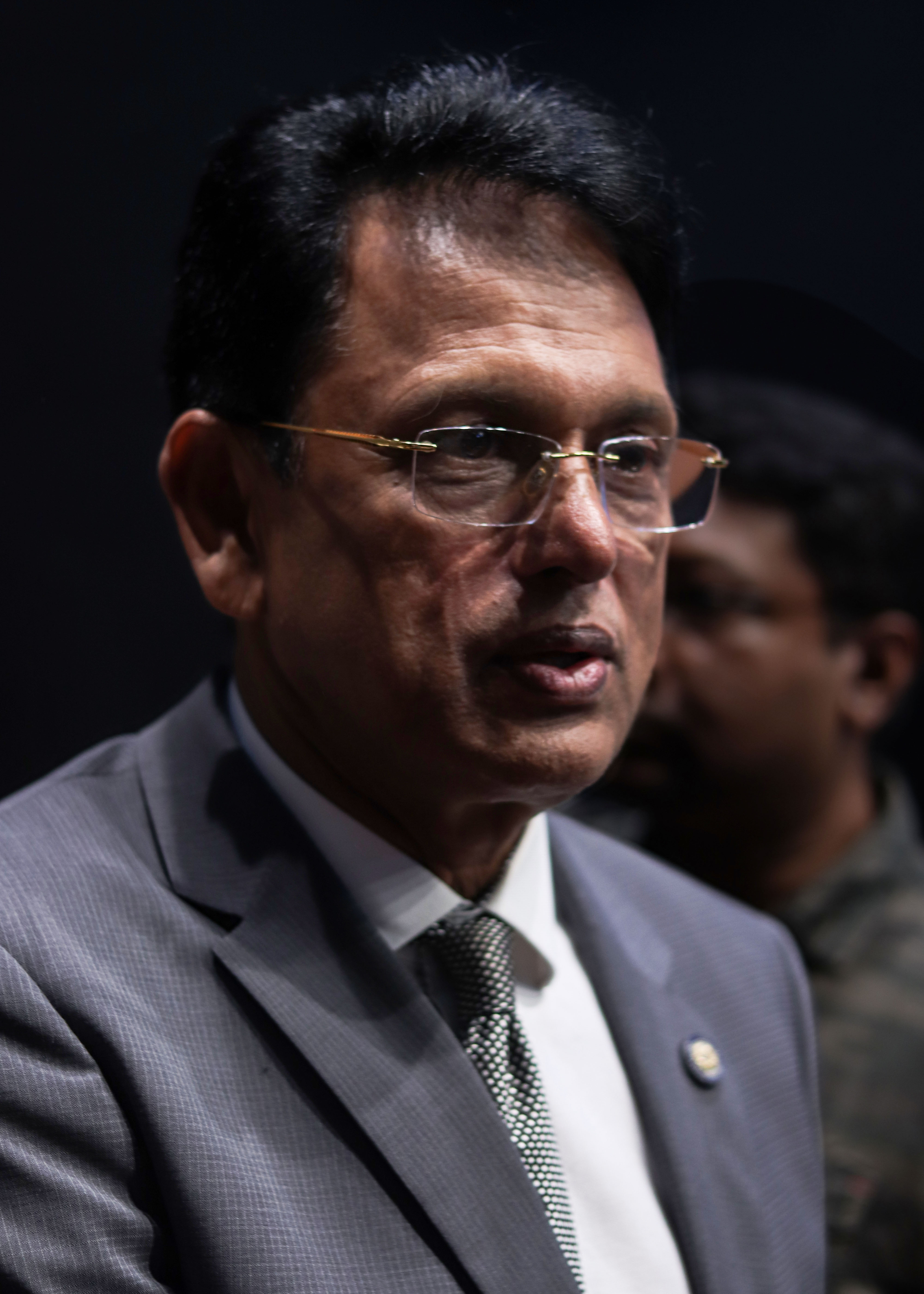
- Incumbent; A. N. M. Ehsanul Hoque Milan since 17 February 2026
- Ministry of Education
- Style: The Honourable (formal); His Excellency (diplomatic)
- Type: Cabinet minister
- Status: Minister
- Member of: Cabinet; Advisory Council; Parliament
- Reports to: Prime Minister
- Seat: Bangladesh Secretariat
- Nominator: Prime Minister of Bangladesh
- Appointer: President of Bangladesh; on the advice of the Prime Minister
- Term length: MP term length, Prime Minister's pleasure
- Constituting instrument: Constitution of Bangladesh
- Formation: 29 December 1971; 54 years ago
- First holder: Muhammad Yusuf Ali
- Salary: ৳245000 (US$2,000) per month (incl. allowances)
- Website: moedu.gov.bd

The Minister of Education (Bengali: শিক্ষামন্ত্রী) is the political head of the Ministry of Education (Bangladesh) and one of the cabinet ministers of the Government of Bangladesh, responsible for formulating and overseeing national education policies, administration, and development across all levels of education.

== List of ministers, advisers and state ministers ==
Political parties

- Bangladesh Awami League
- BaKSAL
- Bangladesh Nationalist Party
- Jatiya Party

Other factions

- Independent
- Military

No.	Portrait	Officeholder (birth–death) Constituency	Term of office			Designation	Ministry	Prime Minister/ Chief Adviser
No.	Portrait	Officeholder (birth–death) Constituency	From	To	Tenure	Designation	Ministry	Prime Minister/ Chief Adviser
1		Muhammad Yusuf Ali (1923–1998)	29 December 1971	12 January 1972	3 years, 28 days	Minister	Mujib I	Tajuddin Ahmad
1		Muhammad Yusuf Ali (1923–1998)	13 January 1972	16 March 1973	3 years, 28 days	Minister	Mujib II	Sheikh Mujibur Rahman
1		Muhammad Yusuf Ali (1923–1998)	16 March 1973	26 January 1975	3 years, 28 days	Minister	Mujib III	Sheikh Mujibur Rahman
2		Muzaffar Ahmed Chowdhury (1922–1978)	26 January 1975	15 August 1975	284 days	Minister	Mujib IV	Muhammad Mansur Ali
2		Muzaffar Ahmed Chowdhury (1922–1978)	15 August 1975	6 November 1975	284 days	Minister	Mostaq	Vacant
3		Ziaur Rahman (1936–1981)	10 November 1975	26 November 1975	16 days	Deputy Chief Martial Law Administrator	Sayem	Vacant
4		Abul Fazal (1903–1983)	26 November 1975	22 June 1977	1 year, 208 days	Adviser	Sayem	Vacant
5		Syed Ali Ahsan (1903–1983)	22 June 1977	29 June 1978	1 year, 7 days	Adviser	Sayem	Vacant
6		Kazi Zafar Ahmed (1939–2015)	4 July 1978	11 October 1978	99 days	Minister	Zia	Mashiur Rahman (Senior Minister)
7		Abdul Baten (born–?); MP for Patuakhali-4	11 October 1978	12 March 1979	285 days	Minister of State (M/C)	Zia	Mashiur Rahman (Senior Minister)
7		Abdul Baten (born–?); MP for Patuakhali-4	12 March 1979	15 April 1979	285 days	Minister of State (M/C)	Zia	Vacant
8		Shah Azizur Rahman (1925–1989); MP for Kushtia-3	15 April 1979	27 November 1981	2 years, 302 days	Prime Minister	Zia	Himself
8		Shah Azizur Rahman (1925–1989); MP for Kushtia-3	27 November 1981	11 February 1982	2 years, 302 days	Prime Minister	Sattar	Himself
9		Tafazzal Hossain Khan (1920–2022); MP for Mymensingh-1	11 February 1982	24 March 1982	41 days	Minister	Sattar	Shah Azizur Rahman
10		A. Majeed Khan (1929–2023); MP for Mymensingh-1	26 May 1982	11 December 1983	2 years, 6 days	Adviser	Ershad	Vacant
10		A. Majeed Khan (1929–2023); MP for Mymensingh-1	11 December 1983	1 June 1984	2 years, 6 days	Minister	Ershad	Vacant
11		Shamsul Huda Chaudhury (1920–2000); MP for Mymensingh-5	1 June 1984	15 January 1985	228 days	Minister	Ershad	Ataur Rahman Khan
11		Shamsul Huda Chaudhury (1920–2000); MP for Mymensingh-5	4 August 1985	16 February 1986	196 days	Minister	Ershad	Ataur Rahman Khan
12		M. A. Matin (1932–2012); MP for Pabna-5	16 February 1986	23 March 1986	35 days	Minister	Ershad	Vacant
13		A. K. M. Nurul Islam (1919–2015)	24 March 1986	25 May 1986	62 days	Minister	Ershad	Vacant
14		M. A. Matin (1932–2012); MP for Pabna-5	25 May 1986	9 July 1986	45 days	Minister	Ershad	Vacant
15		Momen Uddin Ahmed (born–?); MP for Khulna-5	9 July 1986	30 November 1986	144 days	Minister	Ershad	Mizanur Rahman Chowdhury
16		Mahbubur Rahman (born–1940); MP for Comilla-7	30 November 1986	27 March 1988	1 year, 118 days	Minister	Ershad	Mizanur Rahman Chowdhury
17		Anisul Islam Mahmud (born–1947); MP for Chittagong-5	27 March 1988	10 December 1988	258 days	Minister	Ershad	Moudud Ahmed
18		Sheikh Shahidul Islam (born–1948); MP for Madaripur-3	10 December 1988	2 May 1990	1 year, 143 days	Minister	Ershad	Moudud Ahmed
19		Kazi Zafar Ahmed (1939–2015); MP for Comilla-12	2 May 1990	6 December 1990	218 days	Prime Minister	Ershad	Himself
20		Zillur Rahman Siddiqui (1928–2014)	10 December 1990	16 March 1991	96 days	Adviser	Shahabuddin	Vacant
21		A. Q. M. Badruddoza Chowdhury (1930–2024); MP for Munshiganj-1	20 March 1991	19 September 1991	183 days	Minister	Khaleda I	Khaleda Zia
22		Muhammad Jamiruddin Sircar (born–1931); MP for Panchagarh-1	19 September 1991	19 March 1996	4 years, 182 days	Minister	Khaleda I	Khaleda Zia
23		Rafiqul Islam Miah (born–1943); MP for Comilla-3	19 March 1996	30 March 1996	11 days	Minister	Khaleda II	Khaleda Zia
24		Md. Shamsul Haque (?–?)	3 April 1996	23 June 1996	81 days	Adviser	Habibur	Muhammad Habibur Rahman
25		ASHK Sadek (1934–2007); MP for Jessore-6	23 June 1996	15 July 2001	5 years, 22 days	Minister	Hasina I	Sheikh Hasina
26		ASM Shahjahan (1941–2019)	16 July 2001	10 October 2001	86 days	Adviser	Latifur	Latifur Rahman
27		Osman Faruk (born–1940); MP for Kishoreganj-4	11 October 2001	28 October 2006	5 years, 17 days	Minister	Khaleda III	Khaleda Zia
28		Iajuddin Ahmed (1931–2012)	1 November 2006	11 January 2007	71 days	Chief Adviser & President	Iajuddin	Himself
29		Ayub Quadri (born–1946)	16 January 2007	26 December 2007	344 days	Adviser	Fakhruddin	Fakhruddin Ahmed
30		Hossain Zillur Rahman (born–1951)	10 January 2008	6 January 2009	362 days	Adviser	Fakhruddin	Fakhruddin Ahmed
31		Nurul Islam Nahid (born–1945); MP for Sylhet-6	6 January 2009	12 January 2014	10 years, 1 day	Minister	Hasina II	Sheikh Hasina
31		Nurul Islam Nahid (born–1945); MP for Sylhet-6	12 January 2014	7 January 2019	10 years, 1 day	Minister	Hasina III	Sheikh Hasina
32		Dipu Moni (born–1965); MP for Chandpur-3	7 January 2019	11 January 2024	5 years, 4 days	Minister	Hasina IV	Sheikh Hasina
33		Mohibul Hasan Chowdhury (born–1983); MP for Chittagong-9	11 January 2024	5 August 2024	207 days	Minister	Hasina V	Sheikh Hasina
34		Muhammad Yunus (born–1940)	8 August 2024	16 August 2024	8 days	Chief Adviser	Yunus	Himself
35		Wahiduddin Mahmud (born–1948)	16 August 2024	5 March 2025	201 days	Adviser	Yunus	Muhammad Yunus
36		Chowdhury Rafiqul Abrar (born–1952)	5 March 2025	17 February 2026	349 days	Adviser	Yunus	Muhammad Yunus
37		A. N. M. Ehsanul Hoque Milan (born-1957); MP for Chandpur-1	17 February 2026	Incumbent	242 days	Minister	Tarique	Tarique Rahman
