= 1974 Ramna massacre =

Mass shooting of Marxist protestors in Bangladesh

- Part of the 1972–1975 Bangladesh insurgency
- Location: Ramna Thana, Dhaka Division, Bangladesh
- Date: 17 March 1974
- Attack type: Massacre, extrajudicial killing, politicide
- Deaths: 40–50
- Injuries: 20
- Perpetrator: Jatiya Rakkhi Bahini

The 1974 Ramna Massacre was a massacre of Jatiya Samajtantrik Dal (JASAD) supporters that took place on 17 March 1974. The incident took place when a group of demonstrators from the Jatiya Samajtantrik Dal, who were blockading the residence of the home minister, Mansur Ali, located in the Ramna area of Dhaka, was fired upon by members of the Jatiya Rakkhi Bahini. The incident reportedly claimed at least twelve lives.

== Background ==
After Bangladesh won its independence through the liberation war of 1971, an ideological conflict was raised on the question of how Bangladesh would be governed. When Awami League leadership opted for democracy as its first choice, a large section of Awami League's student front, the Bangladesh Students League, led by A. S. M. Abdur Rab and Shajahan Siraj, expressed their dissent with the idea. This section, mostly the followers of former General Secretary of the front Serajul Alam Khan, formed a new political party opposing the Awami League's view and to establish a form of socialism they called Scientific Socialism.

Soon after the formation of the Jatiya Samajtantrik Dal, the Jasad-fueled protests were met with Sheikh Mujibur Rahman's Jatiya Rakkhi Bahini personnel, who were accused of conducting raids in the opposition politicians houses, torture, murders and abductions of the opposition activists.

== Declaration ==
Due to corruption, misappropriation of relief items, hoarding of essential goods by marketeers, and smuggling of food grain to India, during the initial days of 1974 there was inflation. Moreover, the Jatiya Rakkhi Bahini came down hard on the protests. Jasad presented 29 points and promised to surround the government establishments those were linked with the distribution of relief goods and food grain on 10 February 1974 through a public statement if the points were ignored. The statement read,

Awami League has already passed 25 months in power. Due to the boundless corruption, nepotism, fascism, torture of civilians, and lousy rule of capitalist

Mujib government on one hand and enslaved by other nations on the other hand, the independence and the lives of the people of Bangladesh have turned into a nightmare.

Such a situation should not be allowed to prevail sine die. So, it is high time to decide who, between the oppressors and the oppressed, should survive.

People of the country think that the government will get enough time to fulfill the demands of the people within March 15 of 1974. We urge the government to take the points seriously.

And if the government fails to fulfill the demands, we on behalf of the common mass will go for the following programmes.

- Offices of the Deputy Commissioners, Sub-Divisional Administrators and Circle Officers will be blockaded
- Prisons will be surrounded by people
- Houses of rich farmers will be surrounded by people
- People will surround the Ministers, State Ministers and the Members of Parliament
- Chairmen of the Relief Committees will be surrounded by people
- License-permit holders, black marketeers, and corrupt traders will be surrounded by people
- Occupants of government lands will be surrounded by people
- Occupants of private houses and abandoned properties will be eradicated
- Measures will be taken to ensure the distribution of food grains at cheap cost
- Offices of Trade Corporation of Bangladesh, centres of corruption and nepotism, and other government offices will be surrounded by the people
- At this point, the Presidential Palace, Secretariat and the residence of the Prime Minister will be blockaded by the people
- Additional programs will be followed by the success of the movement.

The declaration gave the Awami League government around one month's time to take necessary measures or to face dire consequences on 17 March.

== 17 March ==
JaSaD-AL Ramna clash
- Part of the 1972–1975 Bangladesh insurgency
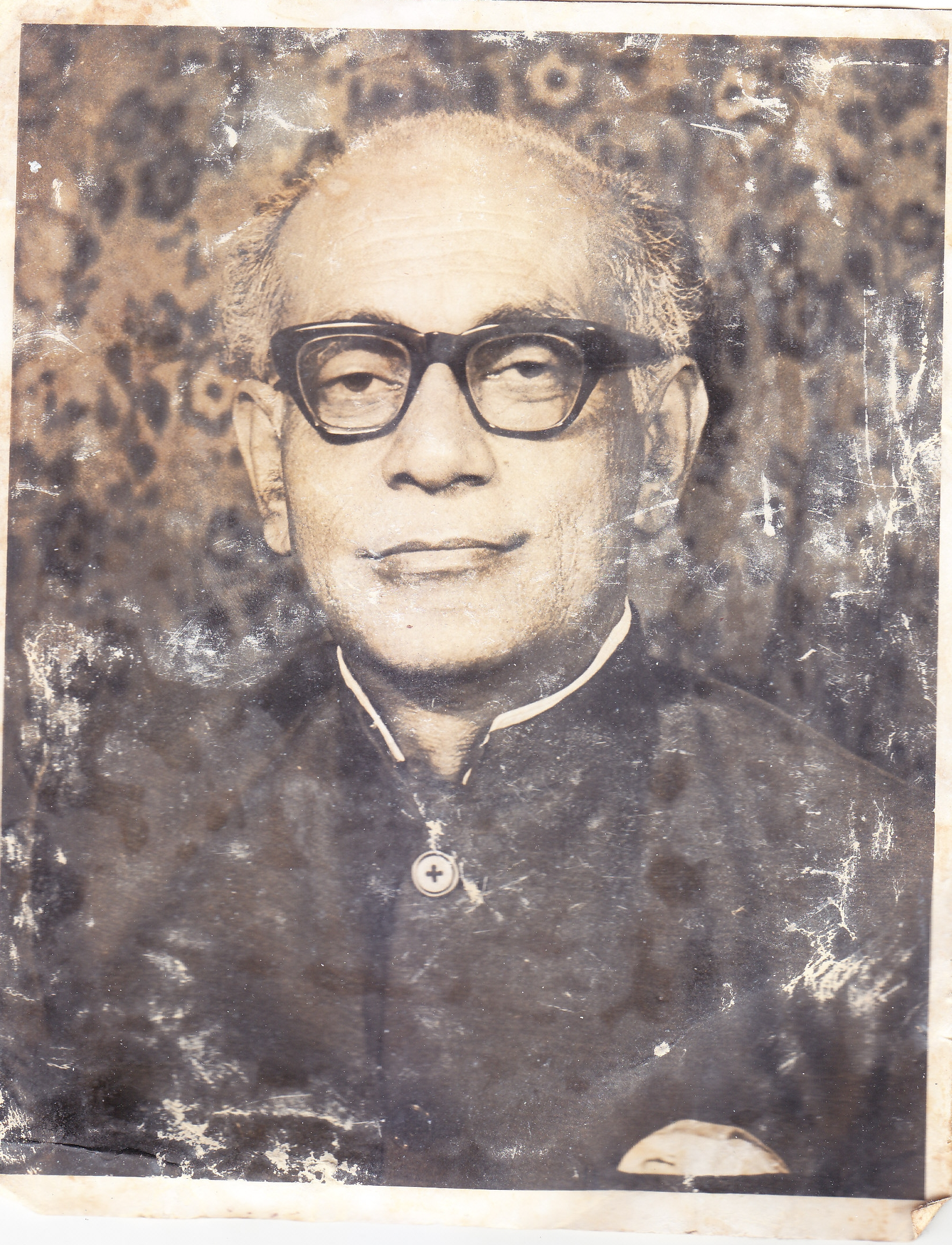
- A picture of Muhammad Mansur Ali
- Date: 17 March 1974
- Location: Minto Road, Ramna Thana, Dhaka Division, Bangladesh
- Caused by: Corruption within the Awami League
- Goals: Get the Awami League to implement the 29 points
- Methods: Siege; Protest
- Status: Protest violently suppressed

Parties
Government of Bangladesh: Awami League; Jatiya Rakkhi Bahini; Ministry of Home Affairs; Bangladesh Police	Jatiya Samajtantrik Dal: Marxist protestors

Lead figures
Mansur Ali; Ahmad Ullah Khan	A. S. M. Abdur Rab (WIA) (POW); Hasanul Haq Inu (WIA) (POW); Mohammad Abdul Jalil (WIA) (POW); Mukul Desai †; Momtaz Begum (WIA)

Casualties and losses
Several injured	12-50 protestors killed 6 protestors killed and 20 injured (Awami League claim)

Casualties
- Injuries: 20

On 17 March, supporters of Jasad and the angry people of the capital and its surrounding areas started gathering at the Paltan ground of the capital as Jasad called a public meeting to mark the deadline of the ultimatum. They also distributed anti-government leaflets.

The rally was supposed to end before sunset and then march towards the residence of Home Minister Mansur Ali to submit a Memorandum of Redemption after briefly laying siege around the house.

Police charged the crowd to disperse the rally and foil the siege, and a clash ensued between the police and the Jasad men. Jasad men started throwing brickbats targeting the police after the police started firing tear gas shells over the crowd. Within minutes, the area turned into a battlefield and the Jatiya Rakkhi Bahini was called on.

Once the armed Jatiya Rakkhi Bahini personnel reached the place with trucks, they started firing live bullets on the crowd. At this point the Jasad activists fell down on the streets to save themselves from the bullets. But the Rakkhis then started firing at the ground to ensure that the death toll gets higher than ever.

According to A. S. M. Abdur Rab:

Suddenly Rakkhi Bahini and police arrived the spot and started firing. Jalil, Momtaz and I were standing together. Inu commanded us to lie down. We followed the command. Bullets were falling like rain. Suddenly I saw Mukul Desai of Eden College lost her life after being shot. Jahangir was near to me. He died on the spot in front of me.

== Death toll ==
Jasad in an official statement claimed that the death toll is at least fifty.

Ahmad Ullah Khan was a Deputy Superintendent of Police at Tejgaon in the capital Dhaka. He confirmed that 40-50 dead bodies were taken away by Rakkhi Bahini in their trucks that day.

== Aftermath ==
All but Momtaz Begum, who was a student, were landed in the jail that day. They were released only after the assassination of Sheikh Mujibur Rahman. However, Moinuddin Khan Badal eloped from the hospital.

The Daily Ganakantha was the spokesman of Jasad, and many of its correspondents were present during the incident to cover the protest rally. After the massacre that lasted for almost one hour, journalists from Daily Ganakantha prepared a news item on the death of around 50 Jasad supporters and the abduction of their corpses by Jatiya Rakkhi Bahini personnel. But the news was not published, as the police and Jatiya Rakkhi Bahini personnel raided the office of Ganakantha and arrested the editor, Al Mahmud.

In 2016, Bangladesh Nationalist Party leader Ruhul Kabir Rizvi criticized Hasanul Haq Inu for his role in the blockade of the residence of Home Minister Mansur Ali, in response to Inu's derogatory remarks regarding Khaleda Zia.
