= Second Revolution =

Second Revolution may refer to:

- July Revolution, a.k.a. Third French Revolution, a 1830 revolution in France.
- Second Revolution (Republic of China), 1913 civil war in China.
- Second Revolution (Bangladesh), political hypothesis presented by the founding father of Bangladesh, Sheikh Mujibur Rahman.

== See also ==
- Second Industrial Revolution
