= Rakkhi Bahini'r Shotto-Mittha =

- Author: Lieutenant Colonel Anwar Ul Alam
- Original title: রক্ষীবাহিনীর সত্য-মিথ্যা
- Cover artist: Qayum Chowdhury
- Language: Bengali
- Genre: Historical account
- Publisher: Prothoma Prokashan
- Publication date: October 2013
- Publication place: Bangladesh
- Pages: 249 pp
- ISBN: 9789849025399

Rakkhi Bahini'r Shotto-Mittha is a book written by Lt. Col. (retired) Anwar Ul Alam which explores the various activities of the Jatiya Rakkhi Bahini during Sheikh Mujibur Rahman's rule.
