= National Defense Force =

National Defense Force or National Defence Force may refer to:

- Burundi National Defence Force, the military of Burundi
- Ethiopian National Defense Force, the military of Ethiopia
- Maldives National Defence Force, the military and security forces of the Maldives
- South African National Defence Force, the military of South Africa
- National Defence Forces, a Syrian pro-government militia
- Jatiyo Rakkhi Bahini, a paramilitary force operating in Bangladesh from 1972 to 1975
