= Abdul Matin Chowdhury (disambiguation) =

Abdul Matin Chowdhury may refer to:

- Abdul Matin Chowdhury (1921–1981), Bangladeshi academic and physicist
- Abdul Matin Chowdhury (politician) (1944–2012), Bangladeshi politician
- Abdul Matin Chowdhury (scholar) (1915–1990), Bangladeshi religious scholar and political activist
- Abdul Matin Chaudhary (1895–1948), Pakistani Bengali politician and minister
