= Tajul =

Tajul is a given name. Notable people with the name include:

- Ratu Safiatuddin Tajul Alam or Taj ul-Alam (1612–1675), the fourteenth ruler of Aceh
- Tajul Islam Choudhury (1944–2018), Bangladeshi politician
- Tajul Islam Md. Faruk (died 2019), Bangladesh Awami League politician and Jatiya Sangsad member
- Tajul Hossain, veteran of the Bangladesh Liberation War, Health Secretary of Bangladesh
- A. B. Tajul Islam (born 1951), Bangladesh Awami League politician and Jatiya Sangsad member
- Mohammad Tajul Islam, Bangladeshi lawyer at the Bangladesh Supreme Court
- Tajul Islam (scholar) (1896–1967), Bengali Islamic scholar, debater and politician
- Tajul Islam (worker), shifting worker at the Adamjee Jute Mills in Bangladesh
- Syech Yusuf Tajul Khalwati (1626–1699), Indonesian Muslim of noble Makassar descent
- Tajul Muluk (born 1971), Shia religious leader of Madura Island, Indonesia
- Tajul Ariffin Shah of Perak (died 1594), the fourth Sultan of Perak

== See also ==
- Tajul muluk, a commonly used name for a system of geomancy for siting or designing buildings
