= Anwar Ul Alam Shaheed =

Former Colonel in Bangladesh Army

- আনোয়ার উল আলম শহীদ

Ambassador of Bangladesh to Spain
- In office 1 January 2004 – 21 March 2007
- Preceded by: Shahed Akhter
- Succeeded by: Md. Saiful Amin Khan

Ambassador of Bangladesh to Bahrain
- In office 19 December 1998 – 4 June 2001
- Preceded by: Gyasuddin A. Chowdhury
- Succeeded by: Mohammad Azizur Rahman

Personal details
- Born: 22 February 1947 Tangail, Bengal Province, British India
- Died: 10 December 2020 (aged 73) Dhaka, Bangladesh

Military service
- Allegiance: Bangladesh
- Branch/service: Bangladesh Army; National Defence Force; Bangladesh Rifles
- Years of service: 1971-1978
- Rank: Colonel
- Unit: East Bengal Regiment
- Commands: Sub-Commander of Kader Bahini; Additional Director of National Defence Force; Sector Commander of BDR
- Battles/wars: Bangladesh Liberation War

Anwar Ul Alam Shaheed (22 February 1947 – 10 December 2020) was a Colonel of the Bangladesh Army, Secretary in the ministry of Foreign affairs, diplomat, and ambassador of Bangladesh to Spain and Bahrain. He had served in the Kaderia Bahini and Jatiya Rakkhi Bahini.

== Early life ==
Shaheed was born on 22 February 1947 in Thanapara, a suburb of Tangail town in the then Bengal Presidency of British India. His father was Moulvi Abdur Rahim Ichhapuri, an Islamic scholar, and his mother was Begum Eid Un Nesa. Shaheed was involved with student politics since 1962, and president of Tangail District unit of the Chhatra League. He graduated from Bindubhashini High School. Shaheed was elected general secretary of the student union at Salimullah Muslim Hall.

== Career ==
During the Bangladesh Liberation War, Shaheed served in the Kader Bahini, commanded by Abdul Kader Siddiqui, as head of the civilian unit and deputy commander. He was also the editor of Ronangon, the propaganda publication by the Mukti Bahini. He wrote under the penname Ronodut. He provided a tour of the Mukti Bahini hospital, near the village of Andhi, to S I M Nurunnabi Khan. He served as an assistant director of a militia made up of Mukti Bahini and East Pakistan Rifles personnel.

Shaheed met Prime Minister Sheikh Mujibur Rahman at the Gonobhaban on 28 January 1972, who asked him to contact Major ANM Nuruzzaman to talk about forming a militia, which later developed into the Jatiya Rakkhi Bahini. He met Major ANM Nuruzzaman for the first time on 31 January at the Gonobhaban. Taslim Ahmed, was then home secretary, and someone Shaheed viewed with suspicion as he remained loyal to Pakistan during the Bangladesh Liberation War. In 1972, Bangladesh Rifles (formerly East Pakistan Rifles) mutinied. The soldiers who did not fight for the independence of Bangladesh fought against soldiers who did. The situation at the Bangladesh Rifles headquarters, Peelkhana, calmed down after Prime Minister Sheikh Mujibur Rahman visited them.

After the Assassination of President Sheikh Mujibur Rahman in the 15 August 1975 Bangladesh Coup d'état, there were calls for the Jatiya Rakkhi Bahini to be dissolved. Kader Siddiqui visited Shaheed in the morning of 15 August at the Jatiya Rakkhi Bahini and expressed surprised at seeing tanks on the streets of Dhaka. Shaheed told Siddiqui that Bengal Lancers had been given permission to take out three of their tanks. On the evening on 15 August, General Khaled Mosharraf summoned Shaheed and Lieutenant Colonel Sarwar Mollah to the Bangabhaban and defended the assassination of Sheik Mujibur Rahman. Shaheed saw that Khaled Mosharraf and other officers were preparing for an Indian invasion. At a meeting headed by General Ziaur Rahman and attended by Khondokar Moshtaque Ahmed, General M. A. G. Osmani, Major General Khalilur Rahman and Brigadier General ANM Nuruzzaman, Zia suggest it be merged with Bangladesh Army. This was vehemently opposed by Ahmed. Zia was able to convince the group and Jatiya Rakkhi Bahini was merged into Bangladesh Army through the Jatiya Rakkhi Bahini (Absorption in the Army) Ordinance on 5 October and Shaheed became an officer of Bangladesh Army.

In 1978, Shaheed retired from Bangladesh Army as a colonel. He joined the Ministry of Foreign Affairs and was appointed first secretary at the Bangladesh embassy in Indonesia. He served in various capacities at Bangladeshi embassies in Brunei, Hong Kong, and Malaysia. He later served as the ambassador of Bangladesh to Bahrain and ambassador of Bangladesh to Spain. He retired from the foreign service in 2006 with the rank of secretary.

Saqi Anwar wrote a book on Shaheed's life titled Shaheed.

Shaheed established a museum, Shaheed Muktijuddho Jadughor, on the Bangladesh Liberation War in Tangail in 2011. He was the vice president of the Sector Commanders Forum.

== Death ==
On 1 November 2020, Shaheed was diagnosed with brain tumor and later caught COVID-19 during the COVID-19 pandemic in Bangladesh. He recovered from COVID-19 but was still kept on ventilators. He died on 10 December 2020 at United Hospital, Dhaka.

== Bibliography ==
- Rakkhi Bahini'r Shotto-Mittha (The Truths and Lies of the Jatiya Rakhi Bahini)
- Ekattor Amaar Sreshtho Shomoy (1971 was my greatest moment)
