= Mizanur Rahman (journalist) =

Bangladeshi journalist (died 2003)

Mizanur Rahman (c. 1933 – 19 July 2003), commonly known as Mizan, was a Bangladeshi journalist and former central committee member of the Bangladesh Krishak Sramik Awami League one party rule in Bangladesh. He was commercial manager of the state news agency Bangladesh Sangbad Sangstha (BSS), editor and administrator of the now-defunct Bangladesh Press International (BPI), and chief reporter of the daily newspaper Daily Ittefaq. He also worked as a stringer for the Pakistan Times.

== Early life ==
Rahman was an activist of the Bangladesh Chhatra League at Dhaka College. He was associated with Sheikh Mujibur Rahman, Abdul Hamid Khan Bhashani, Huseyn Shaheed Suhrawardy, and AK Fazlul Huq.

== Career ==
From 1967 to 1968, Rahman worked as a stringer for the Pakistan Times. He served in the central committee of the Bangladesh Krishak Sramik Awami League, during the brief one party rule in Bangladesh. In the 1990s, he published a quarterly newsletter called the Mizanur Rahmaner Troimashik Patrika.

Rahman worked in several roles across Bangladeshi journalism and news agencies. He served as the commercial manager of the Bangladesh Sangbad Sangstha (BSS). He was also editor and administrator of the defunct Bangladesh Press International (BPI), and chief reporter of The Daily Ittefaq. The BPI was called the Pakistan Press International before the Independence of Bangladesh in 1971. It was later merged with the BSS. He retired as the business editor of the BSS.

== Death ==
Rahman died of a prolonged illness at BIRDEM hospital on 19 July 2003, aged 70. Funeral prayers were held at the BSS premises in Wari and at the Jatiya Press Club. He was to be buried in his village of Gazipura in Tongi. Prime Minister Khaleda Zia and the Leader of the Opposition and Awami League president Sheikh Hasina sent their condolences. His death anniversary is comemorated by the Journalist Mizanur Rahman Memorial Council.
