= Razia Matin Chowdhury =

Bangladeshi politician

- রাজ়িয়া মতিন চৌধুরী

Member of Bangladesh Parliament
- In office 1996–2001

Personal details
- Born: 1925
- Died: 2 May 2012 (aged 86–87)
- Party: Awami League

Razia Matin Chowdhury (Bengali: রাজ়িয়া মতিন চৌধুরী, Bengali pronunciation: [razia motin tʃoudʱuri]; 1925 – 2 May 2012) was an Awami League politician and a member of parliament from a reserved seat.

== Career ==
Chowdhury was elected to parliament from a reserved seat as an Awami League candidate in 1996. She was the principal of Dhaka University Laboratory School and College. She was a presiding member of the Bangabandhu Parishad and the former president of the University Women's Federation College.

== Personal life ==
Chowdhury was married to Abdul Matin Chowdhury.

== Death ==
Chowdhury died on 2 May 2012 in Z H Sikder Women's Medical College & Hospital, Dhaka, Bangladesh. She was buried at Banani Graveyard.
