= Muzaffar Ahmed Chowdhury =

- মোজাফফর আহমেদ চৌধুরী

Minister of Education
- In office 26 January 1975 – 6 November 1975
- Prime Minister: Muhammad Mansur Ali
- Preceded by: Muhammad Yusuf Ali
- Succeeded by: Ziaur Rahman

14th Vice-Chancellor of University of Dhaka
- In office 21 January 1972 – 12 April 1973
- Preceded by: Syed Sajjad Hussain
- Succeeded by: Abdul Matin Chowdhury

Personal details
- Born: 23 November 1922 Birahimpur village, Noakhali District, Bengal Presidency, British India
- Died: 17 January 1978 (aged 55) Dhaka, Bangladesh
- Resting place: Mausoleum of Kazi Nazrul Islam
- Education: Ph.D. (political science)
- Alma mater: University of Dhaka; University of London
- Occupation: university academic, cabinet minister

Muzaffar Ahmed Chowdhury (23 November 1922 – 17 January 1978) was a Bangladeshi academic. He served as the 13th vice-chancellor of the University of Dhaka. He was appointed the Minister of Education of the Government of Bangladesh for two terms.

== Education and career ==
Chowdhury passed the matriculation examination from Farashganj High School in Noakhali in 1938 and the intermediate examination from Feni College in 1940. And then he earned his bachelor's and master's in political science from the University of Dhaka in 1943 and 1944 respectively. In 1960, he obtained his Ph.D. degree from the University of London.

In 1945, Chowdhury joined the University of Dhaka as a lecturer in political science. He served as the proctor of the university during 1950–1952. He went on to become reader in 1961 and professor in 1969. He served as the vice-chancellor of Dhaka University from January 1972 until April 1973. He was then appointed the chairman of the University Grants Commission.

Chowdhury was a representative of Pakistan to the general assembly of the United Nations Organization (UNO) from November 1956 to February 1957.

=== Political career ===
Chowdhury was the political adviser to Sheikh Mujibur Rahman from February 1969 to March 1971. He served as the Minister of Education in two separate cabinets. In 1975, he joined the Bangladesh Krishak Sramik Awami League (BAKSAL) and was appointed as a member of its executive committee.

== Works ==
Chowdhury has published several books including the following.

- The Civil Service in Pakistan (1963)
- Constitutional Problems of Pakistan, An Examination of the Criticisms against Bureaucracy (1964)
- Government and Politics in Pakistan (1968)
- The Political Systems of Modern States, England, USA, France, USSR and Germany, Rural Government in East Pakistan (1969)
