= Muhammad Yusuf Ali =

Bangladeshi politician and former minister

President of Bangladesh Football Federation
- In office 15 July 1972 – 30 June 1973
- Vice President: Abul Hashem
- Preceded by: Position created
- Succeeded by: Gazi Golam Mostafa

Personal details
- Born: 1923 Farakkabad, Biral, Dinajpur, Bengal Presidency, British India
- Died: 1998 (aged 74–75)
- Education: University of Dhaka; University of Rajshahi
- Occupation: Politician

Muhammad Yusuf Ali (1923 – December 1998) was a Bangladesh politician. He was the first minister for Education and Cultural Affairs in the first cabinet of Bangladesh.

== Early life and education ==
Ali was born in Farakkabad, Biral, Dinajpur in 1923. He matriculated in 1944 from Dinajpur Academy High School and intermediate exams from Ripon College. He got a Bachelor of Arts degree from Surendranath College and a Master of Arts degree from the Dhaka University in 1953. He later earned a B.Law degree from Rajshahi University and joined the Dinajpur district bar.

== Career ==
Ali was a professor of Nawabganj College and afterwards at Surendranath College. He joined East Pakistan Awami League in 1960 and in 1962 was elected to the East Pakistan Legislative Assembly. He was involved in a number of Bengali Nationalist movements including Six point movement, Agartala Conspiracy Case and 1969 uprising in East Pakistan. He was elected to the National Assembly of Pakistan in 1965.

Ali moved to India during Bangladesh Liberation war. On 17 April 1971 he read proclamation of independence of Bangladesh at the oath taking ceremony of Mujibnagar Government. In the Mujibnagar Government he was the chairman of Youth Control Board. It recruited and trained personal for the Mukti Bahini. He was the first minister for Education and Cultural Affairs of Bangladesh, Sheikh Mujibur Rahman cabinet. Ali was the speaker of Ganaporishad (provisional Parliament of Bangladesh) and he made oath of the acting president with ministers of provisional government. He was made the Chairman of Shromik League of BAKSAL (Bangladesh Krishok Shromik Awami League) by Sheikh Mujibur Rahman, then president of Bangladesh. Ali was the founding president of the Bangladesh Football Federation, and served his term from 15 July 1972 to 30 June 1973. He was also the founding president of the Bangladesh Cricket Board. In 1975 he was the Labour Minister in the BAKSAL. In 1975, after the Assassination of Sheikh Mujibur Rahman he joined the Khandakar Mushtaq Ahmed government. He became Minister of Planning of the Khondaker Mostaq Ahmad government.

In 1977, Ali was the secretary-general of Awami League (Mizan). He joined the Bangladesh Nationalist Party after a failed parliamentary election. In 1979 he was Minister of Textile in Ziaur Rahman cabinet. In 1981 he was the Minister of Jute and Textile in Justice Abdus Sattar cabinet. He joined Jatiya Party in 1985. In 1986 he served as relief and rehabilitation minister under president Ershad government.

Ali died in December 1998.
