= A. N. M. Nuruzzaman =

Bangladeshi freedom fighter (1938–1993)

- আ. ন. ম. নুরুজ্জামান
- Born: 2 December 1938; Narsingdi, Bengal, British India
- Died: 16 March 1993 (aged 54); Stockholm, Sweden
- Education: University of Dhaka
- Military career
- Allegiance: Bangladesh; Pakistan (before 1971)
- Branch: Pakistan Army; Bangladesh Army; Jatiya Rakkhi Bahini
- Service years: 1960–1993
- Rank: Brigadier General
- Unit: East Bengal Regiment
- Commands: Commander of Sector – III; Director General of National Defense Force
- Conflicts: Bangladesh Liberation War
- Awards: Bir Uttom

A. N. M. Nuruzzaman Bir Uttom (2 December 1938 – 16 March 1993) was a Bangladeshi army officer, who was also a sector commander in the Bangladeshi War of Liberation. After the war he served as the first and only director general of the paramilitary force Jatiya Rakkhi Bahini.

== Biography ==
Nuruzzaman was born in December 1938 in Saidabad, Raipura, Narsingdi. Abu Ahmad, his father, was a government officer. He graduated from Sunamganj High School and Sylhet Murari Chand College in 1956. He graduated from the University of Dhaka with a B.A.(Hons) degree in history in 1959 and afterward joined the Pakistan Military Academy. In 1960 he was commissioned in the Pakistan army as a second lieutenant.

== Career ==
In 1968 he was promoted to the rank of captain and posted in Quetta, West Pakistan.

=== Agartala Conspiracy case ===
He was one of the accused in the Agartala Conspiracy Case. After the case was withdrawn, he was reinstated in service.

=== Bangladesh Liberation War ===
Nuruzzaman joined the War of liberation in 1971 in the S-Force under K. M. Shafiullah, commander of Sector-3. In September he was made the commander of sector-3 by the Mujibnagar Government. He served in that position till the end of the Bangladesh Liberation War.

== Post Independence ==
He joined the Bangladesh army after the independence of Bangladesh, he was promoted to brigadier general. On 28 January 1972, he and Anwar Ul Alam met to discuss the formation of Rakhi Bahini at the President House on Minto Road, which Sheikh Mujib called the "People's House". In March 1972, the Rakhi Bahini came into existence. He was the director of Jatiyo Rakkhi Bahini. He was in London when Mujib was assassinated in 1975. After the assassination, he was placed under the Ministry of Foreign Affairs, and performed diplomatic responsibilities in Australia, the Philippines, Senegal, Canada, and Sweden.

== Death ==
A. N. M. Nuruzzaman died on 16 March 1993, aged 54, in Stockholm while working as ambassador of Bangladesh to Sweden.

== Legacy ==
The government of Bangladesh awarded him the highest living gallantry award, Bir Uttam, for his role in the Bangladesh Liberation War. Dhaka City Corporation renamed a road Bir Uttam ANM Nuruzzaman Sarak after him.

== Footnotes ==
- This article has been translated from the original report titled "তোমাদের এ ঋণ শোধ হবে না" published on 14 October 2012 in The Daily Prothom Alo. The Daily Prothom Alo has released a Creative Commons Attribution-Share-Alike 3.0 international license on Wikipedia (Permitted). The reports were written by Rashedur Rahman (also known as Tara Rahman) on behalf of The Daily Prothom Alo Liberation War Trust.

== Sources ==
- Anwar Ul Alam (14 March 2014). "An unsung hero". The Independent (Bangladesh). Archived from the original on 2 April 2015.
