= ATM Syed Hossain =

Bangladeshi politician

additional secretary in the Bangladesh Civil Service
- In office 1973–1975

Personal details
- Born: Faridpur District
- Spouse: Sheikh Khadija Hossain Lily
- Occupation: Politician, civil servant

ATM Syed Hossain is a former additional secretary of the Bangladesh government and former member of the executive council of the Bangladesh Krishak Sramik Awami League, the one-party government of the Awami League. He was married to the sister of Sheikh Mujibur Rahman, the first president of Bangladesh.

== Early life ==
Hossain was born in Faridpur District, and his father was Nadir Hossain.

== Career ==
Hossain was a gazetted officer in the East Pakistan Civil Service. Before the independence of Bangladesh, he had the rank of a section officer in the Establishment Division, the service's personnel arm, which is responsible for appointments and transfers. After independence, his career received a boost from his brother-in-law, the new president, Sheikh Mujibur Rahman. He was promoted to the rank of joint secretary in 1972.

In 1973, he was an additional secretary in the Bangladesh Civil Service based in the Ministry of Establishment. He was a member of the Bangladesh Krishak Sramik Awami League central committee, the Awami League-led one-party government.

Hossain was arrested on 23 August 1975, after the assassination of Sheikh Mujibur Rahman in the 15 August 1975 Bangladesh coup d'état, along with 25 others. He was removed from his office. Hossain was detained for two and a half years by the military regime. After being released, he successfully campaigned for the release of the location of the graves of Sheikh Mujibur Rahman's family members killed in the 15 August coup.

== Personal life ==
Hossain married Sheikh Khadija Hossain Lily, the youngest sister of Sheikh Mujibur Rahman and aunt of Sheikh Hasina. His son, Sadek Hossain Bablu, died on 19 December 2020. His daughter, Rosy Jamal, married Sheikh Jamal, son of Sheikh Mujibur Rahman. His second daughter, Habiba Zaman, married Shahaduz Zaman on 10 August 1975. Another daughter, Hamida Wadud Poly, was married to MA Wadud, the father of former minister Dipu Moni. His wife died in 2014.
