= AK Mujibur Rahman =

Bangladeshi politician

Member of Bangladesh Parliament
- In office 1973–1976

Personal details
- Political party: Awami League

AK Mujibur Rahman is a Awami League politician in Bangladesh and a former member of parliament for Bogra-8.

== Career ==
Ahmed was elected to parliament from Bogra-8 as an Awami League candidate in 1973.
