= Tajul Hossain =

Tajul Hossain was a veteran of the Bangladesh Liberation War and the first Health Secretary of Bangladesh. He was a Trustee Board member of Independent University, Bangladesh.

== Early life ==
Tajul Hossain was born in 1920 in Comilla District, British India. He completed his medical studies in Kolkata and Dhaka in the early 1940s and was associated with M. N. Roy.

== Career ==
Tajul Hossain did his post graduate studies at the New York University Medical Center.

Tajul Hossain served in the Bangladesh Liberation War as an organizer.

After the Independence of Bangladesh Tajul Hossain was appointed the First Health Secretary of the country. He talked to The New York Times about the importance of birth control in Bangladesh when there seven births in every minute in the country. He was a member of the Central Committee of Bangladesh Krishak Sramik Awami League, the one party government that ruled Bangladesh in the early 1970s.
