= Gazi Golam Mostafa =

Bangladeshi politician

Member of East Pakistan Provincial Assembly

President of Bangladesh Football Federation
- In office 30 June 1973 – 19 June 1976
- Vice President: Salahuddin Yusuf
- Preceded by: Muhammad Yusuf Ali
- Succeeded by: Mir Shawkat Ali

Personal details
- Died: 19 January 1981 Ajmer, Rajasthan, India
- Party: Awami League

Gazi Golam Mostafa (Bengali: গাজী গোলাম মোস্তফা; died 19 January 1981) was a Bangladeshi politician and former president and general secretary of the Dhaka city Awami League He was also a member of the East Pakistan provincial assembly.

== Career ==
Mostafa was the personal secretary of Sheikh Mujibur Rahman when he was the head of the Alpha Insurance Company in East Pakistan.

Mostafa was a former president and general secretary of the Dhaka city Awami League.

Mostafa spoke about organizational activities of the city, how can it be better and where was the problem. Mostafa and Sheikh Mujibur Rahman used to discuss these issues regularly in the evenings. There are allegations against him that during the famine of 1974, as the chairman of the Red Crescent Society, he took hold of millions of blankets and tins of baby food sent to Bangladesh as relief for the people through foreign aid, and he began to profit out of these goods by selling to the people for whom it was sent. It is said that only one out of 7 tins of baby food and one out of 13 blankets sent as relief reached the poor during the famine.

In 1973, Mostafa was elected as president of the Bangladesh Football Federation (BFF), succeeding Muhammad Yusuf Ali, following the first ever BFF elections. He served from 30 June 1973 to 19 June 1976, before being succeeded by Mir Shawkat Ali. He also served as the vice-president of Shantinagar Club.

=== Major Dalim's Abduction ===
In 1974, Mostafa kidnapped Major Shariful Haque Dalim and his wife from the Dhaka Ladies Club after an argument. It was Dalim's cousin's wedding reception in the Dhaka Ladies Club. Dalim's only brother-in-law Bappi (his wife Nimmi's brother) was attending from Canada. Mostafa's son occupied the chair in the row behind Bappi and pulled Bappi's hair from the back. Bappi scolded the boy for his behavior and told him not to sit on the row behind him anymore. Mostafa's sons (who were close friends of Sheikh Kamal) and some associates forcefully abducted Dalim, Nimmi, the groom's mother, and two of Dalim's friends (both of whom were distinguished freedom fighters) in microbuses owned by the Red Crescent. Mostafa was taking them to the Rakhi Bahini headquarters but later took them to the residence of Sheikh Mujibur Rahman.

Sheikh Mujibur Rahman mediated a compromise between them and made Mostafa apologize to Nimmi. When news of the abduction spread, the 1st Bengal Lancers ransacked Mostafa's and took his whole family prisoner. They also set up check posts all over the city searching for Major Dalim and the abductees. Some officers lost their jobs as a result. The officers involved, including Shariful Haque Dalim, were later orchestrators of the coup on 15 August 1975 and the assassination of Sheikh Mujibur Rahman.

=== Imprisonment ===
After the assassination and subsequent fall of Sheikh Mujib's administration, Mostafa was apprehended by bystanders while trying to flee to India via land border along with "huge amount of money". He was jailed and was sentenced to ten years' imprisonment by a martial law court, but was released on 28 March 1980 during the presidency of Ziaur Rahman.

== Death ==
Following his release, he was reportedly planning to visit the Shrine of Mu'in al-Din Chishti at Ajmer and travelled with his family to India and stayed in Delhi for a period. On 19 January 1981, while en route to Ajmer by car, a truck collided with their vehicle, resulting in the deaths of Mostafa and his entire family.
