= Abdul Matin Chowdhury =

Bangladeshi academic and physicist

- আবদুল মতিন চৌধুরী

15th Vice-Chancellor of University of Dhaka
- In office 13 April 1973 – 22 September 1975
- Preceded by: Muzaffar Ahmed Chowdhury
- Succeeded by: Muhammad Shamsul Huq

Personal details
- Born: 1 May 1921 Nandanpur village, Lakshmipur District, Bengal Presidency, British India
- Died: 24 June 1981 (aged 60) Dhaka, Bangladesh
- Resting place: Mausoleum of Kazi Nazrul Islam
- Spouse: Razia Matin
- Education: Ph.D. (atmospheric physics)
- Alma mater: University of Chicago
- Occupation: University academic, physicist, professor

Abdul Matin Chowdhury (1 May 1921 – 24 June 1981) was a Bangladeshi academic and physicist. He served as the 15th vice-chancellor of the University of Dhaka.

== Education ==
Chowdhury passed the entrance examination from Arunchandra High School in Noakhali District in 1937 and intermediate from Dhaka Intermediate College in 1939. He received his bachelor's and master's degrees in physics from the University of Dhaka. He obtained a Ph.D. in atmospheric physics from the University of Chicago in 1949. He completed Ph.D. for the second time in 1961.

== Career ==
Chowdhury started his career as a meteorologist in the Pakistan Meteorology Department. He then joined as a reader in the Physics Department of the University of Dhaka in 1950. He went on to become a professor in 1962 and the head of the department during 1962–1967. He served as a member of the Pakistan Atomic Energy Commission during 1967–1970, chief scientist of the Ministry of Defence and the president's scientific advisor during 1970–1971.

Chowdhury was a member of the selection committee for the Nobel Prize in Physics for Asian Region.

In 1973, Chowdhury was appointed vice-chancellor of Dhaka University, where he served until 1975.

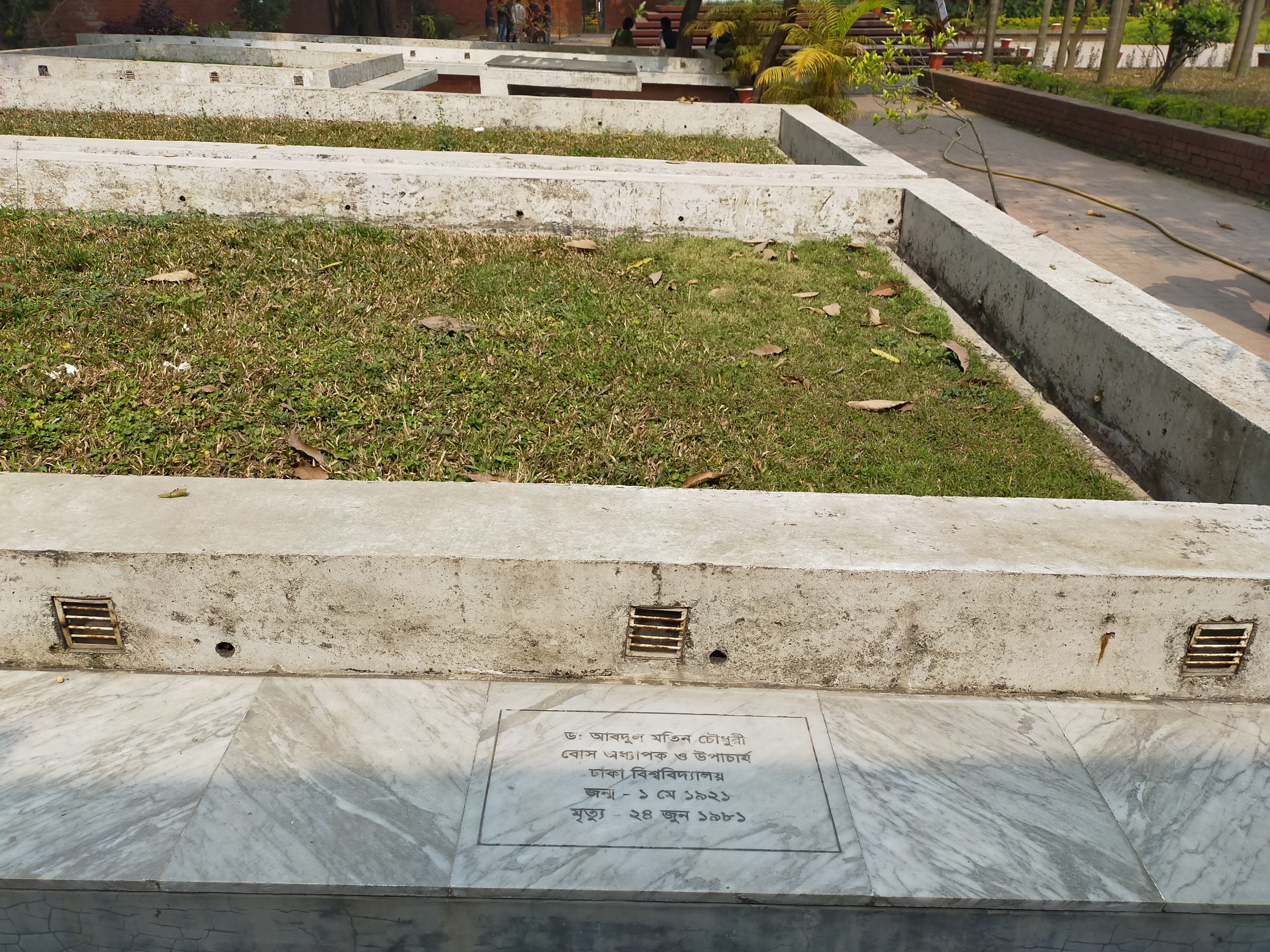
Grave of Abdul Matin Chowdhury by the side of Dhaka University central mosque, Ex Vice-chancellor of Dhaka University.

== Personal life ==
Chowdhury was married to Razia Matin (1925–2012).
