= Al Mahmud =

Bangladeshi poet (1936–2019)

- আল মাহমুদ
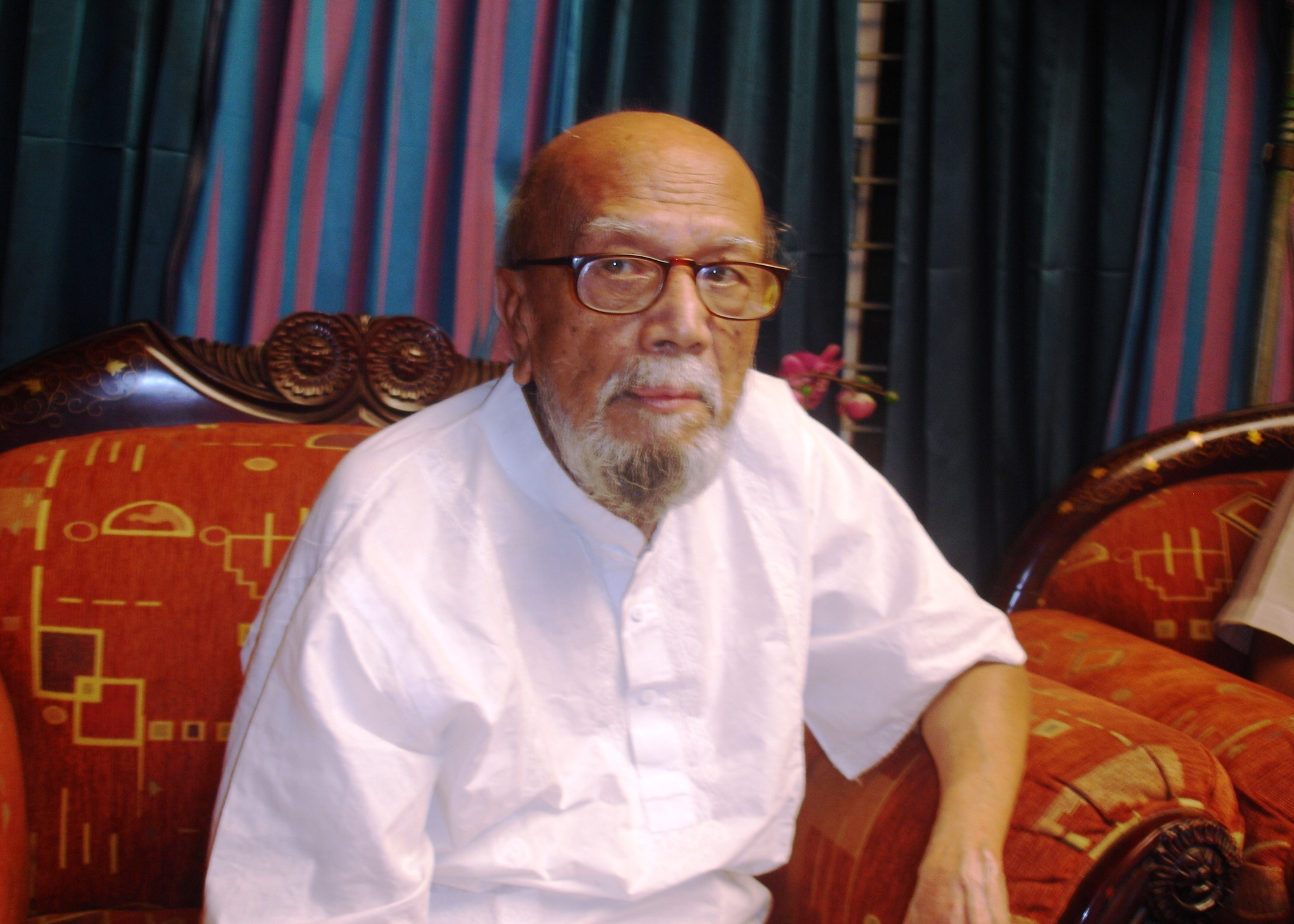
- Mahmud in 2009
- Born: Mir Abdus Shukur Al Mahmud; 11 July 1936; Brahmanbaria District, Bengal Presidency, British India
- Died: 15 February 2019 (aged 82); Dhaka, Bangladesh
- Occupations: Poet, journalist
- Spouse: Late Sayeda Nadira Begum
- Children: 8
- Writing career
- Genres: Poet, novelist, short-story writer
- Subject: Literature
- Notable works: Lok Lokantor; Kaler Kalosh; Sonali Kabin; Mayabi Porda Dule Otho
- Notable awards: Full list

Mir Abdus Shukur Al Mahmud (known as Al Mahmud; 11 July 1936 – 15 February 2019) was a Bangladeshi poet, novelist, and short-story writer. He is considered one of the greatest Bengali poets to have emerged in the 20th century. His work in Bengali poetry is dominated by his frequent use of regional dialects. In the 1950s he was among those Bengali poets who were outspoken in their writing on such subjects as the events of the Bengali language movement, nationalism, political and economical repression, and the struggle against the West Pakistani government.

== Early life and career ==
Al Mahmud was born on 11 July 1936 at Morail Village of Brahmanbaria District in present-day Bangladesh into a Bengali Muslim Zamindar family that had the hereditary title of Mir. The ancestors of the family had migrated to the Indian Subcontinent to preach Islam. His father Mir Abdur Rab and mother Raushan Ara Mir were cousins. His grandfather Mir Abdul Wahhab Mullah was a Mullah and Zamindar in Brahmanbaria district. Mir Abdul Wahhab was also a teacher and cleric in his local village school. His childhood and secondary education days were spent in this village which is located adjacent to Brahmanbaria town.

Mahmud started his career as a journalist. He obtained widespread recognition after Lok Lokantor was published in 1963. In succession, he then penned Kaler Kalosh (1966), Sonali Kabin (1973), and Mayabi Porda Dule Otho (1976). His other notable poetic collections include Arobbo Rojonir Rajhash, Bakhtiyarer Ghora and Nodir Bhitorer Nodi. In addition to writing poetry, he wrote short stories, novels and essays such as Pankourir Rakta and Upamohadesh. In 1971 he went to India and worked there to build public opinion in favour of the Liberation War of Bangladesh. After the war, he joined The Daily Ganakantha as the assistant editor. He was jailed for a year during the regime of the Awami League government. Later, he joined Bangladesh Shilpakala Academy in 1975 and retired in 1993 as director of the academy.

== Literary work ==
Al Mahmud's literary work Shonali Kabin published in 1973, is considered as a landmark of Bengali poetry. Philosopher Sibnarayan Ray commented:

Al Mahmud has an extraordinary gift for telescopic discrete levels of experience; in his poems I find a marvelous fusion and wit which reminds me occasionally of Bishnu Dey. The complete secularism of his approach is also striking…he was born and brought up in a very conservative Muslim religious family; it is not a secularism forced by some ideology, but present naturally and ubiquitously in his metaphors, images and themes.

== Selected works ==
- Lok Lokantor (1963)
- Kaler Kalos (1966)
- Shonali Kabin (1973)
- Mayabi Porda Dule Otho (1976)
- Arobbo Rojonir Rajhash
- Bokhtiyarer Ghora 1984
- Dinjapon
- Ditiyo Bhangon
- Ekti Pakhi Lej Jhola
- Subcontinental
- The girl of fire
- Second breakdown
- Dahuki
- Golpshomogro
- Jebhabe Gore Uthi
- Kishor Shomogro
- Kobir Atmobisshash
- Kobita Somogro- 1, 2
- Pankourir Rakta (1975)
- Na Kono Shunnota Mani Na
- Nodir Bhitorer Nodi
- Pakhir Kache, Phooler Kache
- Prem O Bhalobashar Kobita
- Prem Prokritir Droho Ar Prarthonar Kobita
- Upomohadesh
- Trishera

== Awards ==
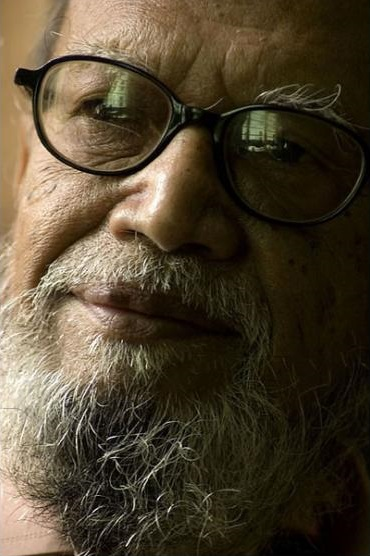
Mahmud in 2007

- Bangla Academy Literary Award (1968)
- Joy Bangla Award (1972)
- Humayun Kabir Memorial Award (1972)
- Jibonananda Memorial Award (1972)
- Kaji Motaher Hossain Literary Award (1976)
- Kabi Jasim Uddin Award
- Philips Literary Award (1986)
- Ekushey Padak (1986)
- Nasir Uddin Gold Award (1990)
- Chattagram Sangskriti Kendro Farrukh Memorial Award (1995)
- Alakta Literary Award
- Lalon Award (2011)
- Independence Award (2025)
