= Manoranjan Dhar =

Bangladeshi politician (1904–2000)

- মনোরঞ্জন ধর

Ambassador of Bangladesh to Japan
- In office 21 June 1972 – 20 February 1973
- Preceded by: Position created
- Succeeded by: Abdul Muntaquim Chaudhury

Minister of Law, Justice and Parliamentary Affairs
- In office 16 March 1973 – 15 August 1975
- Preceded by: Kamal Hossain
- Succeeded by: Abu Sadat Mohammad Sayem

Personal details
- Born: 21 February 1904 Mymensingh District, Bengal Presidency, British India
- Died: 22 June 2000 (aged 96)
- Party: Bangladesh Awami League, National Congress Party
- Spouse: Bhakti Dhar
- Education: Calcutta University
- Occupation: Politician, diplomat, lawyer

Manoranjan Dhar (21 February 1904 – 22 June 2000) was a Bangladeshi politician and diplomat. He was an adviser to Mujibnagar Government during Bangladesh Liberation War

== Early life ==
Dhar graduated from Ananda Mohan College. He obtained his bachelor's from Calcutta University. He participated in the Non-cooperation movement in 1921. He took part in the Chittagong armoury raid in 1930. He was an editor of the weekly Gana-Abhijan during 1938–1940.

== Political career ==
Dhar was elected a member of the Bengal Legislative Council in 1946 and the East Bengal Legislative Assembly during 1947 – 1958. During Bangladesh Liberation War he was appointed as an adviser to Mujibnagar Government. In 1972, he was appointed the ambassador of Bangladesh to Japan. He was in charge of the Ministry of Law, Justice and Parliamentary Affairs of Bangladesh on 16 March 1973.

== Death ==
Dhar died on 22 June 2000.
