= Jatiya Rakkhi Bahini =

Dissolved armed wing of the Awami League (1972–1975)

Jatiya Rakkhi Bahini National Security Force
- জাতীয় রক্ষীবাহিনী
- Seal of Jatiya Rakkhi Bahini
- Other name: JRB; Rakkhi
- Leader: Brigadier General A. N. M. Nuruzzaman
- Founded: 1 February 1972
- Dates active: 1972–75
- Dissolved: 9 October 1975
- Merged into: Bangladesh Army
- Country: Bangladesh
- Allegiance: Sheikh Mujibur Rahman
- Headquarters: Sher-E-Bangla Nagar, Dhaka, Bangladesh
- Ideology: Mujibism; Anti-communism; Anti-Maoism; Chauvinism
- Status: Disbanded
- Size: 16,000 (1975)
- Part of: Awami League

The Jatiya Rakkhi Bahini (Bengali: জাতীয় রক্ষী বাহিনী, lit. 'National Security Force') was a Bangladeshi paramilitary force formed in 1972 by the Sheikh Mujibur Rahman government. Initially formed to curb an insurgency and maintain law and order, the force became involved in numerous charges of human rights abuses, including political killings, shooting by death squads, and rape. It was seen as the armed wing of the ruling Awami League and it swore an oath of loyalty to Sheikh Mujibur Rahman.

The Rakkhi Bahini has been condemned by many academics and journalists, including Ghulam Murshid who compared it with the Gestapo, and Anthony Mascarenhas who said that it was a "gang of hoodlums little different from the Nazi Brown shirts." Human Rights Watch states that the institutionalized violence committed by the Jatiya Rakkhi Bahini, established the culture of impunity with which security forces in independent Bangladesh continue to abuse human rights. Pro Awami League commentators dismiss the charges as "myths".

== History ==
=== Background ===
After the end of the Bangladesh Liberation War, there was a violent insurgency led by Jatiya Samajtantrik Dal to replace the elected revolutionary government of the newly independent country with a "scientific socialist" system of government inspired by Soviet Union and the People's Republic of China through the uses of private militias formed by left-wing army commanders who fought in the war, such as Colonel Abu Taher.

During the Liberation War of Bangladesh, numerous civilians joined the war after being trained by the Indian forces. Tajuddin Ahmad felt these people should come under national service as they had arms and training. Tajuddin Ahmad asked Sheikh Mujibur Rahman to form a para-military force for them.

Sheikh Mujibur Rahman primarily rejected the proposal but soon realized the necessity of an elite force, because many police officers died in the Bangladesh Liberation War. Whenever rebels attacked them in their office, they were outnumbered. Raw materials, machinery and goods of factories were being smuggled through the border to India which also became a headache for the newly formed government.

Time remarked after independence that "Many of the more radical young guerrillas who fought with the Mukti Bahini may not be content with the moderate course charted by the middle-aged politicians of the Awami League. Moreover, the present Dacca government is a very remote power in country villages where the local cadres of the Mukti Bahini are highly visible." The article also quoted one of its commanders, Ali Ashraf Chowdhury: "We will never lay down our arms until our social ideals have been realized". he said. The article continues, "So far the Mujib Bahini has done a commendable job of protecting the Biharis, the non-Bengali Moslems who earned Bengali wrath by siding with the Pakistani army. But the government is anxious to disarm the Mujib Bahini, and has plans to organize it into a constabulary that would carry out both police and militia duties."

Masudul Haque in his book, Bangladesher Swadhinota Juddho O CIA (Liberation War of Bangladesh and CIA), mentions Abdur Rajjak, a young leader and the chief of Bangladesh Swecchasebok League (Bangladesh Volunteer's League) that Mujib told them not to surrender all the guns.

Jatiya Rakkhi Bahini was actively deployed just after the Indian Army left Bangladesh on 17 March. The force was trained and brought up by Major General Sujan Singh Uban from Research and Analysis Wing (RAW) as per the request of Sheikh Mujibur Rahman. Moidul Hassan, confirmed this information in the book Muktijuddher Purbapor. Moidul Hassan wrote,

Analyzing the geo-political situation when United States started to recover their loss after the surrender of Pakistan Army on 16 December, Pakistan government had to release Sheikh Mujibur Rahman without any condition. Just after returning home Sheikh Mujibur Rahman realized to form a security force and he decided to form the Jatiyo Rakkhi Bahini only with the loyal part of Maujib Bahini. Without any discussion in the cabinet, which members were concerned about the stages of liberation war he himself gave the responsibility of forming the force to Major General S. S. Uban who was a recruit of CIA in 60s and now working as the IG of RAW.

However, this is at least partially inaccurate as Pakistani President Bhutto did not release Sheikh Mujibur Rahman "without any condition". Indeed, at the direction of Indira Gandhi, who was desperate to keep Sheikh Mujibur Rahman alive and to free him, some 90,000 Pakistani POWs (including thousands of women and children civilians) were housed in comfort and released without extradition or charges despite massive and manifest human rights violations against both Bengali Muslims and Hindus during the War of Liberation. In Savar camp there was three additional battalions who were called Recruit Battalion. These three battalions were directly supervised by Major Bala Reddy. Anwar-ul-Alam admitted that there were many Junior Commissioned Officers of Indian Army in the training camp of Savar.

=== Formation ===
On 3 January 1972, naming prime minister Tajuddin Ahmad as the chairman, the Bangladesh government announced the names of the ten members of the Central Regulating Board of the National Militia. The members were:

1. Maulana Abdul Hamid Khan Bhashani (chairman, National Awami Party (Bhashani))
2. Abul Hasnat Muhammad Qamaruzzaman (home minister, People's Republic of Bangladesh)
3. Manoranjan Dhar (member of National Assembly, Awami League)
4. Moni Singh (chairman, Communist Party of Bangladesh)
5. Professor Muzaffar Ahmed (president, National Awami Party (Muzaffar))
6. Gazi Golam Mostafa (member of Provincial Assembly, Awami League)
7. Rafiq Uddin Bhuiyan (member of Provincial Assembly, Awami League)
8. Tofael Ahmed (member of National Assembly, Awami League)
9. Abdur Razzaq (member of Provincial Assembly, Awami League)
10. Captain (retd.) Muhammad Shujat Ali (member of Provincial Assembly, Awami League).

Sheikh Mujibur Rahman, wanted to merge the Jatiya Rakkhi Bahini, with the Bangladesh Rifles but the Bangladesh Rifles personnel stiffly opposed the move in a commotion that resulted in a mutiny. This plan was then abandoned.

The Jatiya Rakkhi Bahini Order (President's order No. 21) of 1972 provided for the establishment of the force and set out its responsibilities and powers. The presidential order, published on 7 March, was retroactive to 1 February.

Political opponents of the Awami League allege that the Rakkhi Bahini was made to replace the army. The Rakkhi Bahini had automatic weapons, steel helmets, jeeps, trucks etc. The Awami League government seemed to be more interested in the development of the militia than in the armed forces. It was planned that this militia would be increased annually so that by the end of 1980 its strength would be 20,000. On the other hand, Bangladesh Army was poorly equipped. In winter they had to guard the border in slippers.

The Rakkhi Bahini was distrusted by the defence services in Bangladesh because of its pro-Indian orientation. This was so for several reasons. First, most of the members of the armed forces who fought during the War of Independence strongly believed that the Indian Army just walked in at the end of Bangladesh Liberation War thereby robbing the Bangladesh military of the "glory of liberating their motherland." Second, many senior military officers believed that the government-in-exile at Mujibnagar signed a secret treaty with the Indian government, compromising the sovereignty of Bangladesh and that Sheikh Mujib became less interested in the development of the defence forces because of that treaty. Third, many senior army personnel felt that the Jatiya Rakkhi Bahini was planned and designed by the Indian Army for the safety of the Awami League regime. The poorly equipped defence services were also bitter about the fact that the Indian Army took away all the sophisticated weapons left by the Pakistan Army.

Mascarenhas also records the statement of Major General Abul Manzoor, that numerous military personnel were killed by Rakkhi Bahini terming them as Razakars or collaborators. Despite the indignation, from July 1973 to July 1974, the army conducted a number of combined military operations with the Rakkhi Bahini and the police such as checking for smuggling at the border, handling 'extremists', and maintaining law and order.

The Jatiya Rakkhi Bahini (Amendment) Act of 1974 added two new articles, 8A and 16A, to the act, effective retroactively to 1 February 1972. Article 8A granted officers of the Rakkhi Bahini the power to arrest without warrant any person they reasonably suspect of having committed a cognizable offence under any law. This is similar to the power of police officers. The article further states that anyone arrested by the Rakkhi Bahini shall be delivered forthwith to the nearest police station. It also gives officers the right of search and seizure in connection with any reasonable suspicion that an offence has been committed.

Article 3 of the act says,

No suit, prosecution, or other legal proceedings shall be against any member of the Bahini for anything which is in good faith done or intended to be done in pursuance of this order or rule made there under."

=== After the assassination of Sheikh Mujibur Rahman ===
When Sheikh Mujibur Rahman was killed on 15 August 1975 by members of the Bangladesh Army, the Rakkhi Bahini was very inactive.

After the coup, members of Rakkhi Bahini who were deployed all around the country escaped from their camps and houses in fear of mob-violence, as the people were very angry with them.

After the death of Sheikh Mujibur Rahman, the force was absorbed in Bangladesh Army after the "Jatiyo Rokkhi Bahini Absorption Act, 1975 came into effect. It was issued on 9 October 1975 and was in effect from 3 September 1975.

The director general of the force Brigadier Nuruzzaman was appointed as an ambassador after the force was absorbed.

== Organization ==
Jatiya Rakkhi Bahini had a complete table of organization which was circulated on 8 March 1972 by a gazette notification. The chief of the force was known as director general. His five deputies were known as Deputy Director General. In reality, the Rakkhi Bahini was under the direct control of the prime minister's office and attached to the local Awami League units. In time, the government planned to place each unit under the command of a district governor. The Rakkhi Bahini also swore an oath of loyalty to Sheikh Mujibur Rahman.

Brigadier A. N. M. Nuruzzaman was appointed as the director general while Major Anwar Ul Alam Shahid (deputy director, Training), Lieutenant Colonel Abul Hasan Khan (deputy director, administration), Lieutenant Colonel Sarwar (deputy director, operations), Lieutenant Colonel Sabihuddin Ahmed (deputy director, signals), Lieutenant Colonel Azizul Islam (deputy director, Zonal Headquarters of Chittagong) and Lieutenant Colonel A M Khan (deputy director, medical) were his six deputies. The bulk of the Rakkhi Bahini personnel were recruited from the Mujib Bahini, a militia force that was formed during the concluding part of Liberation War and was under direct Indian supervision.

The basic training of the force officers candidates were given in Indian Military Academy, and at Savar camp, under the supervision of Indian military officer named Major Bala Reddy. Any other additional courses, special courses were also provided by Indian Army, at the Indian Military Academy of Dehradun.

Some additional land and properties were also given to this force by the government. The zonal headquarters building in the Bhatiary of Chittagong and lands in Giltala of Khulna, Bateshwar of Sylhet, Bogra and in Mirpur of Dhaka.

During its first days as it was formed as an auxiliary of Police, it helped police to guard the office. When police failed to control the situation, they were deployed. At least 44 offices and residents of police were attacked and looted from June to December 1973. So the government deployed Jatiyo Rakkhi Bahini within September of the year. JASAD challenged the government's activities and started to gain huge popularity especially among the students and youths. And many other secret organizations emerged and gained popularity as the government was failing to solve almost every issue.

== Human rights abuses ==
The Rakkhi Bahini committed various human rights abuses, including extrajudicial killing, forced disappearances, shooting by death squads, and rape. Jatiya Samajtantrik Dal claims that over 60,000 of its members were killed. The most conservative estimates put the death toll at over 2000. Syed Badrul Ahsan dismisses these claims as "myths."

Anthony Mascarenhas describes the activities of Jatiyo Rakkhi Bahini in his book Bangladesh: A Legacy of Blood, he writes:

The Jatiyo Rakkhi Bahini, which roughly translated means National Security Force, was an elite para-military force whose members had to take oaths of personal loyalty to Mujib. Despite its high-sounding name, it was a sort of private army of bully boys not far removed from Nazi Brown shirts.

Mascarenhas adds that by the end of 1973 the total of politically motivated murders in Bangladesh had crossed the 2000 mark. The victims included some members of Parliament and many of the murders were resulted of intra-party conflicts within Awami League.

Within three years, political killings by Jatiya Rakkhi Bahini reached about 30,000. This included numerous Jatiyo Samajtantrik Dal members.

Even the capital Dhaka was not immune to the violence. An unofficial curfew was introduced after midnight. Almost every rickshaw, taxi and private car was checked and searched by Rakkhi Bahini personnel.

Aside all these, the Rakkhi Bahini was also accused of Bengali chauvinism and ethno-nationalism, after it deliberately targeted and raided tribal villages belonging to ethnic minorities, in Chittagong Hill Tracts from 1972. The raids were always followed with enforced disappearances, rape, tortures and land usurpation. This aggravated tensions in the Hill Tracts, and led to the beginning of the Chittagong Hill Tracts conflict.

=== Early violence ===
1973, the Rakkhi Bahini started assaulting and attacking workers in industries and factories. One particular incident was a road-rage incident from Rakkhi Bahini. On June 29 a passenger bus overtook a Rakkhi Bahini truck at Chittagong. This allegedly enraged the force's personnel, and they surrounded the bus. Due to pressure from bystanders and passengers, they were forced to let the bus go. However, soon they followed the bus and opened fire at the Chittagong Eastern Refinery. Four people reportedly killed and several were injured.

=== 1974 famine ===
When the famine started, millions of people came to the capital from villages in search of food. The government decided to drive the poor and have-nots out of the capital as it was embarrassed in front of international community with the famine. On 3 January Jatiya Rakkhi Bahini was deployed to 'Clean Dhaka' depriving the poor-beggars and the destitute from the city. In this operation about 200,000 have-nots and slum dwellers were taken away from the capital and were forced either to return to their villages or to be moved to the three camps. The camps were hastily laid out several miles from the city. Condition of the camps was disastrous.

Amongst the three camps, the camp of Demra was the most appalling one, in where Jatiya Rakkhi Bahini gathered about 50,000 people. Those people were ill-treated and sometimes they felt that death is a better solution.

Al Mahmud did not listen to the government and tried to publish the accurate news. When the government came to know that, they sent three trucks full of Police and Jatiya Rakkhi Bahini personnel to seize the office and press of 'Gonokontho' at night and arrested the Editor Al Mahmud along with seven workers of the press.

=== Crackdowns on JaSaD ===
==== 1974 Ramna massacre ====
Jasad, frequently tortured by JRB, decided to hold a rally on 17 March at Paltan. They also made a plan to surround the residence of Home Minister Muhammad Mansur Ali on the same day after the rally.

On 17 March 1975, agitated Jasad supporters tried to set up a barricade in front of the residence of the Home Minister Muhammad Mansur Ali after the rally. But prepared Rakkhi Bahini personnel started firing indiscriminately upon the crowd leaving several people dead on the spot.

A notable occurrence occurred on 17 March 1975. Jatiya Rakkhi Bahini set up fire on the headquarters of JASAD on 14 March 1975. JASAD decided to form a rally towards Home Minister Mansoor Ali's house and surround it as a counter to that incident on 17 March.

The rally that started from Paltan was forwarding to the Home Minister's house but the Jatiya Rakkhi Bahini opened brush-fire and at least 50 JASAD activists were killed on the spot.

During the regime of Sheikh Mujibur Rahman thousands of youths were killed due to the suspicion of having connection with JASAD by Jatiya Rakkhi Bahini.

Among them a leader of Bangladesh Krishak League central committee and a teacher of Nawabganj High School Siddiqur Rahman Khan was killed on 10 October 1972. On 17 September 1973 JASAD Student's League leader Bablu, Robi, Ebadat Ali, Motaleb, Kalu and many other were killed in daylight by Jatiya Rakkhi Bahini.

Notable victims include: General Secretary of City College Students' Union Jahangir, student of Jahangir Nagar University Shah Borhan Uddin Rokon, student of BUET Nikhil Chandra Saha; Narshingdi JASAD leader Alauddin; JASAD leader from Gazipur Akram, Joinal, Shamsu, Badal, Anwar; Manikganj JASAD leader Shahadat Hossain Badal, Delwar Hossain Haraj, Abdul Awal Naju, Najim; activists from Jamalpur Giasuddin Master; JASAD activist Abdur Rashid, Hasu Miah; leader from Mymensingh Masuduzzaman, Abdul Jabbar; Madaripur JASAD activist Jahngir, Saddam, Ali Hosen, Mofijur; Faridpur's Kamaluzzaman, Abdul Hakim; Moniddin Ahmed, Salam Master, Rafique Uddin from Razshahi; Ata, Ranju, Manik Das Gupta, Tota, Colonel Rana, Khalil, Rajjak of Bagura; Natore's JASAD leader Nasiruddin; leader from Pabna Ashfaqur Rahman Kalu.

==== Execution of Siraj Sikder ====
Siraj Sikder was a fought for the independence of Bangladesh and was educated in EPUET, later BUET. During the 1971 liberation war, he established the Proletarian Party of East Bengal on June 3. On the first congress of the party he was elected as the party's president on 14 January 1972. He started working as the President of the party. In 1973, he was elected as the President of an alliance of eleven peoples' organization named as Purba Banglar Jatyo Mukti Front (National Liberation Front of East Bengal). But analysing political situation of the country which was named as "One Party Democracy" by Guardian and the increasing torture over his party members forced him to choose the way of revolution.

On 28 December 1974, the government announced the first ever state of emergency in the history of Bangladesh and arrested all opposition leaders. From then Sikder was being treated as an outlaw by the law and enforcement forces. He went underground after the promulgation of emergency. A Jatiya Rakkhi Bahini commander later denied that the murder of Sikder was committed by his force.

=== Torture ===
Aruna Sen the wife of politician Shanti Sen, was detained by the Jatiya Rakkhi Bahini, along with her relative Chanchal Sen. She was subjected to torture while in captivity. Aruna Sen published a statement regarding her captivity in the 17 March edition of Weekly Holiday and in the June edition of Monthly Sangskriti in 1974. After Aruna Sen was detained, a writ was filed at Supreme Court. The court asked Jatiya Rakkhi Bahini to present her in front of the court and prove her detention legal. They presented her but failed to support the legality of the detention. She also noted that Rakkhi Bahini cadres in rural areas also spread anti-Hindu sentiments and called them ‘"Malauns."

Shahjahan was an 18-year-old boy from what is now Naria Upazila of Faridpur District. He was arrested in Dhaka on 28 December 1973 and handed over to the Rakkhi Bahini at their request. He was not seen again after 2 January 1974, when his brother said he saw him in custody at Rakkhi Bahini headquarters. His brother petitioned the court for a writ of habeas corpus, challenging the legality of Shahjahan's detention. The Rakkhi Bahini responded that Shahjahan had escaped on 29 December, so was not in detention and could not be brought to the court. On cross examination, officers said the organization followed no regulations or procedure. They kept no records of their searches, seizures, arrests, or other activities. Former prime minister Moudud Ahmed believes that because Shahjahan allegedly belonged to the student wing of the Jatiya Samajtantrik Dal, an opposition political party, the Rakkhi Bahini killed him and secretly disposed of his body. Without evidence, however, the Rakkhi Bahini could not be held to account.

The court held that the Rakkhi Bahini version of events was "a pure concoction" that "demonstrates complete disregard of the law of the country." In May 1974, Justice Debesh Bhattacharya, condemned the organization in his verdict, stating:

The irregular and very unsatisfactory manner of the handling of the matter by the Rakkhi Bahini has created a situation that urgently calls for an effective action on the part of the authorities to clear the cloud and create a sense of assurance in the mind of the people.

The court urged the government to hold an enquiry into the whereabouts of Shahjahan, but none was ever undertaken.

Ayesha Faiz is the widow of Faizur Rahman and the mother of novelists Humayun Ahmed and Muhammad Zafar Iqbal. A house in Babar Road of Mohammadpur was allotted to her by the government for her husband. But just after three days she was kicked out of the house with her family by a Subedar Major of Jatiya Rakkhi Bahini. She detailed the incident in her biography Jibon Je Rokom (Life as it is). Ayesha Faiz left the home with her children. She later recalled: "Once I was made refugee by the Pakistan Army of occupation. The second time it was done by Sheikh Mujibur Rahman's Jatiyo Rakkhi Bahini.

== Legacy ==
=== Human rights abuse ===
Human Rights Watch states that institutionalized violence committed by the Jatiya Rakkhi Bahini, established the culture of impunity and widespread prevalence of abuses by security forces in independent Bangladesh. Its human rights abuses were revived by the fomration of the Rapid Action Battalion in 2004, which remains accused of extrajudicial killings of over 1000 members of the political opposition and enforced disappearance.

Pro-Awami columnist Syed Badrul Ahsan defends its actions, but acknowledges "it would have been more effective and effectual, more properly indoctrinated in the spirit of the 1971 war, history would have been different."

=== In popular culture ===
- The Black Coat, a historical novel written by Neamat Imam and published by Penguin Books India in 2013, presents the most scathing criticism of Sheikh Mujib's rule and his employment of the Rakkhi Bahini in decades. The novel explores Sheikh Mujib's rule from 1972 to 1975, especially during the Bangladesh famine of 1974, when he became increasingly autocratic. Radio Canada commented that: The Black Coat is 'a novel that slays Sheikh Mujib,' and The Daily Star remarked: '...a poignant political tale... Imam has shown a lot of courage in dealing with one of the most tumultuous and controversial phases of independent Bangladesh's history.'

== See also ==
- Rapid Action Battalion
- Kader Bahini
- Mujib Bahini
- Human rights in Bangladesh
- Freedom of religion in Bangladesh
