= Janata =

Janata (janatā), is a Hindi word for "the populace"; or "the people". Following the first Janata coalition in the 1970s between the Lok Dal, the Congress (O) and the Socialist Party, it has become part of the name of a number of federal- and state-level, present and historical, political parties in India or neighbouring states (many of which claim descent from constituents of the original coalition), including:

In Indian federal politics:

- Janata Party
- Janata Parivar
- Bharatiya Janata Party
  - Bharatiya Janata Yuva Morcha
- Hindustan Janata Party
- Janata Dal
- Janata Dal (Ajit)
- Janata Dal (Bidhuri)
- Janata Dal (Left)
- Janata Dal (Secular)
- Janata Dal (United)
- Janata Party (Secular)
- Garib Janta Dal (Secular)
- Jai Prakash Janta Dal
- Loktantrik Janata Dal
- Rashtriya Janata Dal
- Socialist Janata (Democratic)
- Samajwadi Janata Dal
- Samajwadi Janata Dal (Democratic)
- Samajwadi Janata Party
- Samajwadi Janata Party (Rashtriya)

In Indian constitutive states:

- Asom Bharatiya Janata Party (Assam)
- Biju Janata Dal (Odisha)
- Chhattisgarh Janata Congress
- Gujarat Janata Congress
- Janata Dal (Gujarat)
- Karnataka Janata Paksha
- Kerala Janatha
- Mizo Janata Dal (Mizoram)
- Rashtravadi Janata Party
- Rashtriya Janata Party
- Sikkim Janata Congress
- Sikkim Janata Party
- Tamizhaga Janata Party (Tamil)
- Telangana Janata Party (Andhra Pradesh)
- Vidarbha Janata Congress (Maharashtra)

Outside India:

- Krishak Shramik Janata League (Bangladesh)
- Janata Dal (Samajbadi Prajatantrik) (Nepal)
- Rastriya Janata Party Nepal
- Nepal Samajwadi Janata Dal
- Janata Bank, state-owned bank in Bangladesh

== See also ==
- Jana (disambiguation), people in Hindi
- Lok (disambiguation), people in Hindi
- Awam (disambiguation), people in Urdu
- Awami (disambiguation)
