= Lok =

Lok or LOK may refer to:

== Places ==
- Lok, Serbia, a village
- Lok, Levice District, Slovakia, a village
- Lok, Pakistan, a village
- Loka or Lok, a plane of existence in Indian religions

== People ==
=== Surname Lok (English origin) ===
- Anne Locke, Lock or Lok (1530–after 1590), English poet, translator and Calvinist
- William Lok (1480–1550), usher to Henry VIII
- Henry Lok (1553? – 1608?), English poet, grandson of William Lok
- John Lok, English sea captain, son of William Lok
- Michael Lok, (c.1532–c.1621), English traveller, son of William Lok
- Rose Lok (1526–1613), English writer, daughter of William Lok

=== Surname Lok (Chinese origin 駱) ===
- Anna Suk-Fong Lok, gastroenterologist at the University of Michigan
- Felix Lok (b. 1953), Hong Kong actor
- Rose Lok (pilot) (b. 1912)
- Lok Kwan Hoi, Hong Kong rower

=== Surname Lok (Other origins) ===
- Cees Lok (born 1966), Dutch former footballer

=== Fictional characters ===
- Lok, the protagonist of William Golding's novel The Inheritors
- Lok, in the video game series Tak and the Power of Juju
- Lok Lambert, the protagonist of Huntik: Secrets and Seekers

== Military ==
- Soyuz 7K-LOK, planned Soviet lunar vehicle
- LOK (Hellenic Army), Mountain Raider Companies (1946-1975)
- LOK, Cypriot National Guard Special Forces Groups
- LOK (Poland), Liga Obrony Kraju (Country Defence League), paramilitary sport organization in the Poland since 1962

== Entertainment ==
- The Legend of Korra, an animated series in the Avatar franchise
- Legends of Kesmai, an online game
- LOK (band), a Swedish hardcore band active 1995-2002

== Politics ==
Lok (people in Hindi) may refer to:

- Lok Sabha or People's Assembly, lower house of the Parliament of India

=== Political parties ===
- Lok Dal, first to carry the name
- Bharatiya Lok Dal
- Indian National Lok Dal
- Lok Dal (Charan), a political party in India
- Lok Janshakti Party
  - Lok Janshakti Party (Ram Vilas)
  - Rashtriya Lok Janshakti Party
- Lok Satta Party
- Lok Sewak Sangh
- Lok Shakti
- Punjab Lok Congress
- Rashtriya Lok Dal
- Rashtriya Lok Samata Party

== See also ==
- Loc (disambiguation)
- Lock (disambiguation)
- Jana (disambiguation), people in Hindi
- Janata (disambiguation), people in Hindi
- Awam (disambiguation), people in Urdu
- Awami (disambiguation)
