= Cultural depictions of Stephen, King of England =

King Stephen of England (c. 1092/6 – 25 October 1154) was a grandson of William the Conqueror, and has been depicted in various cultural works. He was King of England from 1135 to his death, and also the Count of Boulogne jure uxoris. His reign was marked by a civil war with his cousin and rival the Empress Matilda, in a period called the Anarchy which has been dramatized by Beth Flintoff in her play Matilda the Empress, first performed in November 2017 at St James's Church, Reading. Stephen was succeeded by Matilda's son, Henry II, the first of the Angevin kings.

== Popular fiction ==
Early appearances by Stephen in fiction included the novels For King or Empress (1904) by C. W. Whistler and Armadin by Alfred Bowker (1908). Stephen appeared in the 1921 novel The Fool by H. C. Bailey. The 1958 novel To Keep This Oath by Hebe Weenolsen centres on the power struggle between Stephen and the future Henry II.

Stephen is a prominent character in Sharon Kay Penman's 1995 novel When Christ and His Saints Slept, portrayed as a loving husband and good warrior, but an indecisive monarch who cannot control his barons.

King Stephen is depicted in Ellis Peters' historical detective series Brother Cadfael, which take place during Stephen's reign. He appears in two of them. One Corpse Too Many (1979), set in August 1138, takes place against the background of Stephen's conquest of Shrewsbury and his decision - described as "uncharacteristically harsh" - to execute all members of the former garrison which had held the city for Empress Maud. In Brother Cadfael's Penance (1994) much of the plot takes place during and in the immediate aftermath of an abortive peace conference organised by the Church in November 1145 in an effort to reconcile Stephen with his cousin Matilda and end the civil war.

Cecelia Holland's 1971 novel The Earl, also published as Hammer for Princes, depicts the old and quite tragic King Stephen, facing the death of his own son Eustace and the inevitability of recognizing Prince Henry, his rival's son, as his heir.

Stephen is portrayed in Ken Follett's #1 New York Times Bestseller The Pillars of the Earth (1990). He only appears a few times in the historical fiction novel, and is depicted as more of a warrior than a king. The novel was re-released in 2010.

The Janna Mysteries by Felicity Pulman posits a love-affair between Matilda and Stephen.

Stephen is also depicted as a young lover of Matilda in The Fatal Crown, by Ellen Jones.

Stephen appears in the historical thriller Winter Siege (2014) by Ariana Franklin and Samantha Norman.

== Film and television ==
Stephen has rarely been portrayed on screen. He was played by Frederick Treves in the 1978 BBC TV series The Devil's Crown, which dramatised the reigns of Henry II, Richard I and John, and by Michael Grandage in "One Corpse Too Many," the first episode of the television adaptation of the Cadfael novels (1994). In the TV mini-series adaption of The Pillars of the Earth, (which premiered in the US and Canada in July 2010) King Stephen was played by Tony Curran. In the mini-series Stephen is depicted in a more villainous role than in the books. In the mini-series he is responsible for the shipwreck and murder of the future king and heir to the throne of England, which in the book is caused by barons who want a weaker king they can control. Stephen then lies and swears an oath of allegiance to Maud the daughter of the dying king. But as soon as the king dies Stephen usurps the throne, beginning a bloody civil war with Maud, contesting for the crown. Stephen is haunted by visits from the ghost of the betrayed King of England who shows him visions of the downfall of the pretender.
