= National Awami Party (disambiguation) =

The National Awami Party (English: National People's Party) was a political party in Pakistan that existed from 1957 to 1967.

National Awami Party may also refer to:

- National Awami Party (Bhashani), Bangladesh
- National Awami Party (Muzaffar), Bangladesh
- National Awami Party (Wali), Pakistan
- Bahawalpur National Awami Party, Pakistan
- Bangladesh National Awami Party-Bangladesh NAP
- Oikya National Awami Party, Bangladesh

== See also ==
- Awami (disambiguation)
- Awami Muslim League (disambiguation)
- Awami League, Bangladesh
- Awami National Party, Pakistan
