= Muslim League =

Muslim League may refer to:

== Political parties ==
=== British India ===
- All-India Muslim League, led the demand for the partition of India resulting in the creation of Pakistan
  - Punjab Muslim League, a branch of the organization above
  - Unionist Muslim League or Unionist Party (Punjab), the autonomous Punjab unit of the All India Muslim League, under the leadership of Sikandar Hayat Khan
  - All-India Jamhur Muslim League, formed in 1940 to counter the All-India Muslim League's plans for a separate Pakistan

=== Pakistan ===
Historical

- Muslim League (1947–1958), the original successor to the All-India Muslim League in Pakistan, lasting from independence to 1958
- Convention Muslim League, a brief discontent faction of the Pakistan Muslim League, formed in 1962
  - Council Muslim League, a brief discontent faction of the Convention Muslim League
- Pakistan Muslim League (Qayyum), a political party formed in 1970
- Pakistan Muslim League (J) (Junejo), a political party from 1988 to 2004, founded by Muhammad Khan Junejo
- Pakistan Muslim League (Jinnah), a political party from 1995 to 2004
- Pakistan Peoples Muslim League, a political party from 2009 to 2013
- All Pakistan Awami Muslim League or All-Pakistan Awami League, political party in East Pakistan; succeeded by the Awami League in 1958

Modern

- Pakistan Muslim League, a series of political coalitions in Pakistan, from 1962 onward
- Pakistan Muslim League (N) (Nawaz), a center-right political party, and following the 2013 election the largest political force in the country, founded by Nawaz Sharif
- Pakistan Muslim League (Q) (Quaid-e-Azam), a centre-nationalist political party with a small presence in Parliament, founded by Pervez Musharraf named after Muhammad Ali Jinnah
- Pakistan Muslim League (F) (Functional), a centrist, nationalist, and pro-Hurs clan political party mainly active in Sindh
- Pakistan Muslim League (Z) (Zia), a political party formed in 2002, named after former president of Pakistan Zia-ul-Haq
- Awami Muslim League Pakistan, a political party formed in June 2008
- All Pakistan Muslim League, a political party founded by Pervez Musharraf in 2010
- Pakistan Markazi Muslim League, formerly the Milli Muslim League, an Islamist political party founded by the Jamat-ud-Dawa chief Hafiz Saeed in 2017

=== Bangladesh ===
- Awami League, successor of the All-Pakistan Awami League
- Bangladesh Muslim League, a registered political party with Islamist Ideology

=== India ===
- Indian Union Muslim League, an Islamic political party, successor of the All-India Muslim League in India; mainly active in Kerala
- Muslim League (Opposition), a party founded in Kerala in 1973; merged with the Indian Union Muslim League in 1985
- Indian National League, split from the Indian Union Muslim League

=== Eritrea ===
- Moslem League of the Western Province
- Independent Moslem League

=== Fiji ===
- Fiji Muslim League

== Other ==
- Muslim World League, an international Islamic non-governmental organization in Saudi Arabia

== See also ==
- Muslim League schisms, of the All-India Muslim League and beyond
- Awami Muslim League (disambiguation)
