= Lock =

Lock(s) or locked may refer to:

== Common meanings ==
- Lock and key, a mechanical fastening device
- Lock of hair, a piece of hair
- Lock (water navigation), a device for vessels to transit between different levels of water, as in a canal

== Arts and entertainment ==
- Lock (film), a 2016 Indian Punjabi-language thriller
- Locked (film), a 2024 American thriller
- Locked (miniseries), a 2020 Indian Telugu-language crime thriller
- The Lock (Constable), an 1824 painting by John Constable
- The Lock (Fragonard) or The Bolt, a 1777 painting by Jean-Honoré Fragonard
- Locks (album), by Garnet Crow, 2008
- "Locked", a 1993 song by Mutha's Day Out
- "Locked", a song for the 2011 video game "Ace Combat: Assault Horizon Legacy"
- Lock (waltz), a dance figure
- Lock (Saga of the Skolian Empire), a sentient machine in novels by Catherine Asaro
- LOCK, stage name of Rokka Asahi, a fictional character from BanG Dream!
- Lock, a character in the film The Nightmare Before Christmas
- Lock, a character in Go! Princess PreCure, a Japanese anime series

== People ==
- Lock (surname)
- Ormer Locklear (1891–1920), American stunt pilot and film actor nicknamed "Lock"
- Lock Martin (1916–1959), stage name of American actor Joseph Lockard Martin, Jr.

== Places ==
- Lock, South Australia, a small town
- Lock, Ohio, United States, an unincorporated community
- Lock Island, in the River Thames in England
- Lock Island (Nunavut), Canada, an island

== Sports ==
- Lock (rugby league), a player position
- Lock (rugby union), a player position
- Lock, any of several grappling holds in wrestling, judo and other martial arts

== Computing ==
- Lock (computer science), a bookkeeping object used to serialize concurrent access
- Lock (database), a feature used when multiple users access a database concurrently
- Lock screen
- File locking, a mechanism that restricts access to a computer file
- SIM lock, a restriction on mobile phones to work only in certain countries or with certain providers

== Other uses ==
- Lock (firearm), the ignition mechanism of small arms
- Lock (weapons guidance), a missile navigation system's target acquisition fix
- Fermentation lock, a device used in beer and wine making
- Rope lock, a device used in theater fly systems
- -lock, an Old English suffix

== See also ==
- Airlock, a compartment for transfer between environments with different atmospheres
- Loc (disambiguation)
- Lok (disambiguation)
- Loch, a Gaelic term for certain bodies of water
- Locke (disambiguation)
- LOCKSS (Lots of Copies Keep Stuff Safe), a peer-to-peer network
- Lox, cured salmon filet
- Lock and Key (disambiguation)
