= Looc =

Looc or LOOC may refer to:

== Looc ==
Looc is the name of places in the Philippines:

- Looc, Occidental Mindoro, least populated municipality in Occidental Mindoro
- Looc, Romblon, a municipality
- Looc, a barangay in Calamba
- Looc, a barangay in Mandaue City

== LOOC ==
LOOC may refer to:

- Lillehammer Olympic Organizing Committee, the organizing committee for the 1994 Winter Olympics
- Law & Order: Organized Crime (L&O:OC, LO:OC), a U.S. police procedural TV show

== See also ==
- L2OC, a navigation signal for GLONASS
- LOC (disambiguation)
