= Janna (disambiguation) =

Janna, a well-known Kannada poet of the early 13th century who also served in the capacity of a minister and a builder of temples

Janna may also refer to:

== Given name ==
- Janna Allen (1957–1993), American songwriter
- Janna Dominguez (born 1990), Filipina actress, host, comedian
- Janna Gur, Israeli food writer, editor and cook book author
- Janna Holmstedt (born 1972), Swedish artist
- Janna Hurmerinta, Finnish R&B, soul and neo soul singer, songwriter and pianist. Also known by her mononym Janna
- Janna Levin (born 1967), American theoretical cosmologist
- Janna McMahan, American author
- Janna Michaels, American former child actress
- Janna Malamud Smith, American non-fiction author
- Janna Taylor (born 1948), speaker for the Montana House of Representatives
- Janna Ordonia, a recurring character in Star vs. the Forces of Evil
- Janna, the Storm's Fury, a playable champion character from the multiplayer online battle arena video game League of Legends
- Janna, a fictional character from the TV series The Lion Guard

== Others ==
- Anthene janna, a butterfly in the family Lycaenidae
- Janna Systems, Canadian relationship management solutions company, now acquired by Siebel Systems Inc.
- Janna (album), 2003 album by Ernst Reijseger with Mola Sylla and Serigne C.M. Gueye
- Janna (TV series), German-Polish children's television series
- The Janna Mysteries, medieval crime series by Felicity Pulman

== See also ==
- Ain Janna, a village is located in the Ajloun Governorate in the north-western part of Jordan
- Jana (disambiguation)
- Jenna
- Jhana
