= Awami Muslim League =

Awami Muslim League may refer to:

- Awami Muslim League (Pakistan), founded in 2008
- Bangladesh Awami League, named All Pakistan Awami Muslim League until 1953

== See also ==
- Awami (disambiguation)
- National Awami Party (disambiguation)
- Muslim League (disambiguation)
