= Awami League =

Banned political party in Bangladesh

Bangladesh Awami League বাংলাদেশ আওয়ামী লীগ
- Abbreviation: AL
- President: Sheikh Hasina; Sheikh Selim (acting)
- General Secretary: Obaidul Quader
- Governing body: Central Working Committee
- Founders: Abdul Hamid Khan Bhashani; Yar Mohammad Khan; Shamsul Huq; Sheikh Mujibur Rahman; Huseyn Shaheed Suhrawardy
- Founded: 23 June 1949 (77 years, 152 days) (East Pakistan Awami Muslim League)
- Banned: 10 May 2025 (1 year, 196 days) (Note: Activities were banned by the government and suspended by the Bangladesh Election Commission as a political party until the judicial proceedings regarding the party have ended.)
- Split from: Muslim League
- Headquarters: Dhaka
- Newspaper: Uttaran
- Student wing: Bangladesh Chhatra League
- Youth wing: Bangladesh Awami Jubo League
- Women's wing: Bangladesh Mohila Awami League; Bangladesh Jubo Mohila League
- Farmer wing: Bangladesh Krishak League
- Trade union: Bangladesh Jatiya Sramik League
- Volunteer wing: Bangladesh Awami Swechasebak League
- Armed wing: Mujib Bahini; (1971); Jatiya Rakkhi Bahini; (1972–1975)
- Ideology: Neoliberalism; Economic liberalism; Big tent; Historically: Social democracy; Left-wing nationalism; Democratic socialism
- Political position: Centre to centre-left; Historically: Left-wing
- National affiliation: Grand Alliance
- Colours: Green
- Slogan: Joy Bangla, Joy Bangabandhu ("Victory to Bengal, victory to Bangabandhu")

Election symbol
- Boat

Party flag

Website
- Awami League official

The Bangladesh Awami League, (Note: Bengali: বাংলাদেশ আওয়ামী লীগ, romanised: Bāṅlādēś Āōẏāmī Līg, lit. 'Bangladesh People's League', pronounced: [ˈbaŋlaˌdeʃ ˈawaˌmiliːɡ]) commonly known as the Awami League, (Note: Bengali: আওয়ামী লীগ, romanised: Āōẏāmī Līg; pronounced: [ˈawaˌmiliːɡ]) is a banned political party in Bangladesh and its predecessor East Pakistan. Founded on 23 June 1949, it played a vital role in the country's struggle for independence. The party had maintained a sole dominance over the country's political system between 2009 and 2024, before being ousted in the July Uprising. Due to its role in the July massacre, since May 2025, all activities of the party are banned in Bangladesh.

On 23 June 1949, the party was founded as the East Pakistan Awami Muslim League, (Note: Bengali: পূর্ব পাকিস্তান আওয়ামী মুসলিম লীগ) and after 1955 as the East Pakistan Awami League, by Abdul Hamid Khan Bhashani, Yar Mohammad Khan, Shamsul Huq, and Sheikh Mujibur Rahman. It was eventually established as the provincial party of the All-Pakistan Awami League, founded by Huseyn Suhrawardy which was the alternative to the domination of the Muslim League in Pakistan and over centralization of the government. The party quickly gained vast popular support in East Pakistan and eventually led the forces of Bengali nationalism in the struggle against West Pakistan's military and political establishment. The party under the leadership of Sheikh Mujibur Rahman, led the struggle for independence, first through huge populist and civil disobedience movements, such as the Six Point movement and Non-cooperation movement (1971), and then during the Bangladesh War of Independence.

After the emergence of independent Bangladesh, Awami League under the leadership of Sheikh Mujibur Rahman won the first general elections. The party along with other left-wing political parties of Bangladesh were merged into Bangladesh Krishak Sramik Awami League in January 1975, where Awami League politicians played the leading role in BaKSAL. After the 15 August 1975 coup d'état, the party was made onto the political sidelines, and many of its senior leaders and activists were executed or jailed. In 1981, Sheikh Hasina, the daughter of Sheikh Mujibur Rahman, became the president of the party.

The party played a crucial role in the anti-authoritarian movements against the regime of Hussain Muhammad Ershad. After the restoration of democracy amidst mass uprising in 1990, the Awami League emerged as one of the principal players of Bangladeshi politics. The party formed governments winning the 1996, 2008, 2014, 2018 and 2024 general elections. Throughout its tenure as the ruling party from 2009 to 2024 under Sheikh Hasina, Bangladesh experienced significant democratic backsliding and was consistently described as authoritarian, (Note: Multiple references:) as well as dictatorial. (Note: Multiple references:) It was finally overthrown with the July Uprising in August 2024. Since then, the party remained underground. On 10 May 2025, the interim government banned all activities by the Awami League, in cyberspace and elsewhere, under the Anti-Terrorism Act. The ban will last until the International Crimes Tribunal completes the trial of the party and its leaders. On 12 May 2025, the Bangladesh Election Commission suspended the registration of the Awami League as a party.

Former prime minister Sheikh Hasina has served as president of the Awami League since 1981, with Obaidul Quader as its general secretary since 2016. Amongst the leaders of the Awami League, five served as president of Bangladesh, four served as prime minister of Bangladesh and one (Huseyn Suhrawardy) served as prime minister of Pakistan.

== Name and symbols ==
The early flag of the Awami League used during the Pakistani period

East Pakistan Awami Muslim League was formed as a breakaway faction of the Muslim League in 1949, within two years of the formation of Pakistan. The word Muslim was dropped in 1953 and it became a secular party. The word Awami is the adjectival form for the Urdu word Awam, which means "people"; thus the party's name can be translated as Bangladesh People's League. During the Bangladesh War of Independence of 1971, most Awami League members joined the Provisional Government of Bangladesh and Mukti Bahini to fight against the Pakistan army and the name Bangladesh Awami League was eventually settled upon.

The most common electoral symbol for the party has been a traditional boat, a recognizable and relatable image in riverine Bangladesh. The salutation Joy Bangla (Bengali: জয় বাংলা; meaning "Victory to Bengal" or "Long live Bengal") is the official slogan of the Awami League. It was the slogan and war cry of the Mukti Bahini that fought for the independence of Bangladesh during the Bangladesh Liberation War in 1971. The phrase Joy Bangla, Joy Bangabandhu is used by the party members at the end of speeches and communications pertaining to or referring to the devotion towards Bangladesh and Bangabandhu Sheikh Mujib. The Awami League party flag is a green field with four five-rayed red star at its centre, and a vertical red stripe at the hoist side. The flag also bears some resemblance to the flag of Pakistan, showing the ex-Pakistani origin of the Awami League. The four stars on the Flag represent the four fundamental principles of the party.

== History ==
=== Founding and early Pakistan era (1949–1966) ===
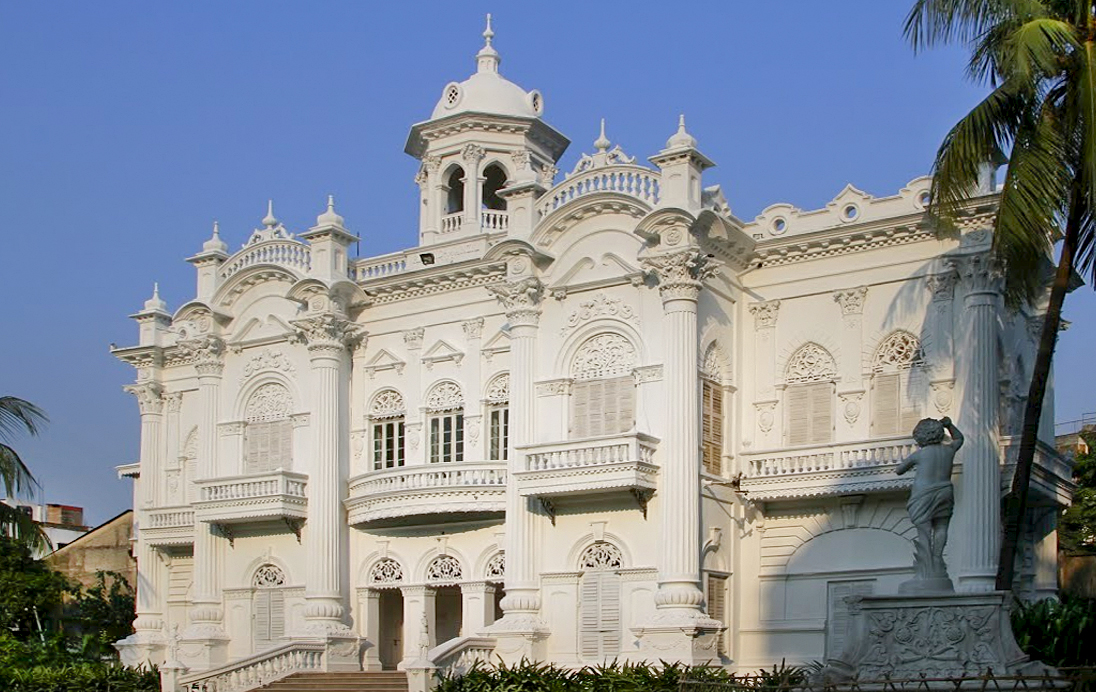
Rose Garden Palace, birthplace of the Awami League in 1949

During the post-Mughal era, no political parties existed in the area known as Bangla or Bangal. After the British arrived and established government, the system of political representation (though much later) was adopted in the area of Bangla (Bengal) or introduced in Bengal. After the official departure of the British, the area known as East Bengal became a part of Pakistan, and the establishment of Islamic governance was led by its founder Muhammad Ali Jinnah and his Muslim League party.

In 1948, there was rising agitation in East Bengal against the omission of Bengali script from coins, stamps and government exams. Thousands of students, mainly from the University of Dhaka, protested in Dhaka and clashed with security forces. Prominent student leaders including Shamsul Huq, Khaleque Nawaz Khan, Shawkat Ali, Kazi Golam Mahboob, Oli Ahad, and Abdul Wahed were arrested and the police were accused of repression while charging protesters. In March, senior Bengali political leaders were attacked while leading protests demanding that Bengali be declared an official language of Pakistan. Among them was A. K. Fazlul Huq, the former prime minister of undivided Bengal.

Amid rising discontent in East Bengal, Muhammad Ali Jinnah visited Dhaka and announced that Urdu would be the sole state language of Pakistan, citing its significance to Islamic nationalism in South Asia. The announcement caused an emotional uproar in East Bengal, where the native Bengali population resented Jinnah for his attempts to impose a language they hardly understood on the basis of upholding unity. The resentment was further fuelled by rising discrimination against Bengalis in government, industry, bureaucracy and the armed forces and the dominance of the Muslim League. The Bengalis argued that they constituted the ethnic majority of Pakistan's population and Urdu was unknown to the majority in East Bengal. Moreover, the rich literary heritage of the Bengali language and the deep rooted secular culture of Bengali society led to a strong sense of linguistic and cultural nationalism amongst the people of East Bengal.

The only significant language in Pakistan not written in the Persian-Arabic script was Bengali. Against this backdrop, Bengali nationalism began to take root within the Muslim League and the party's Bengali members began to take a stand for recognition. On 23 June 1949, Bengali nationalists from East Bengal broke away from the Muslim League, Pakistan's dominant political party, and established the East Pakistan Awami Muslim League. Maulana Abdul Hamid Khan Bhashani and Shamsul Huq were elected the first president and general secretary of the party respectively, Ataur Rahman Khan was elected the vice-president, Yar Mohammad Khan was elected as the treasurer, while Sheikh Mujibur Rahman, Khondaker Mostaq Ahmad and A. K. Rafiqul Hussain were elected the party's first joint secretaries.

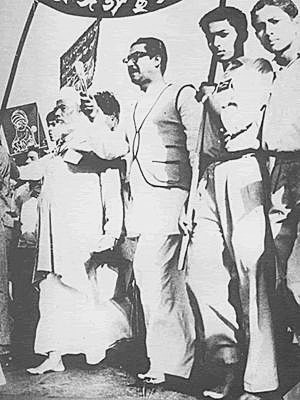
Moulana Abdul Hamid Khan Bhashani and Sheikh Mujibur Rahman marching barefoot to pay their tributes on Language Movement Day of 1953

The party was formed to champion the rights of the masses in Pakistan against the powerful feudal establishment led by the Muslim League. Due to its strength stemming from the discriminated Bengali population of Pakistan's eastern wing, the party eventually became associated and identified with East Bengal. In 1952, the Awami Muslim League and its student wing played an instrumental role in the Bengali language movement, during which Pakistani security forces fired upon protesting students demanding Bengali be declared an official language of Pakistan, killing a number of students including Abdus Salam, Rafiq Uddin Ahmed, Abul Barkat and Abdul Jabbar. The events of 1952 are widely seen by historians today as a turning point in the history of Pakistan and the Bengali people, as it was the starting point of the Bengali nationalist struggle that eventually culminated in the creation of Bangladesh in 1971.

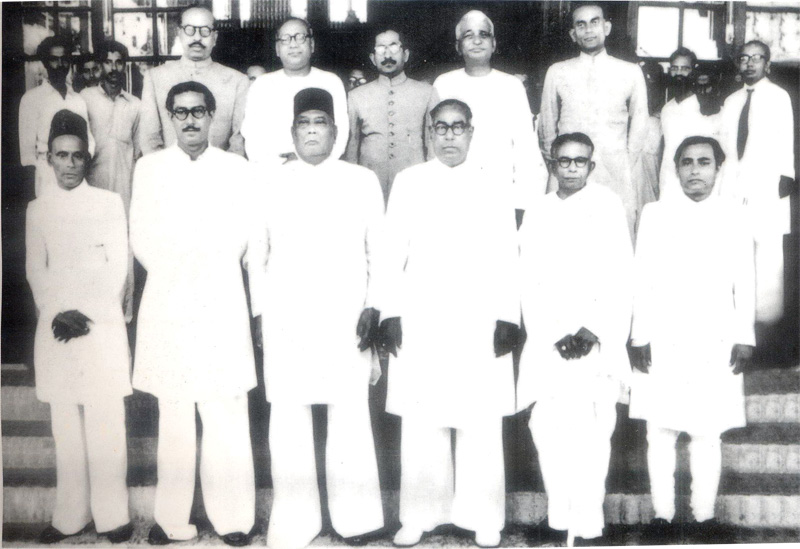
Awami League members in the cabinet of A. K. Fazlul Huq in East Bengal, 1954

Hussein Shaheed Suhrawardy, who had been the All-India Muslim League (AIML)-nominated prime minister of Bengal in 1937 and held the same office after 1946 elections, did not agree to 'Muslim League' as the name of AIML in Pakistan. He initiated the thought that the ideal of political representation under religious identity was no longer prudent after independence and the organisation might be called the 'Pakistan League'. Moreover, he claimed that the Muslim League's objective of struggling to form a nation state had been achieved therefore political representation should continue focusing on nationalism based on Pakistani sovereignty. Suhrawardy's suggestion was not accepted and he parted ways with the party to be re-established as the Awami League in 1949. This was to serve the first shock to the country's political structure. In 1953, the party's council meeting voted to drop the word "Muslim". In the run-up to the 1954 East Bengal Legislative Assembly election, the Awami League took the lead in negotiations in forming a pan-Bangla political alliance including the Krishak Praja Party, Nizam-e-Islam and Ganatantri Dal. The alliance was termed the Jukta Front (United Front) and formulated the Ekush Dafa, or 21-point Charter, to fight for establishing rights in East Pakistan. The party also took the historic decision to adopt the traditional Bengali boat, which signified the attachment to rural Bengal, as its election symbol.

The election in April 1954 swept the United Front coalition into power in East Bengal with an enormous mandate of 223 seats out of 237 seats. The Awami League itself won 143 seats while the Muslim League won only 9 seats. Veteran student leader and language movement stalwart Khaleque Nawaz Khan defeated incumbent prime minister of the then East Bengali Nurul Amin in a landslide margin. Amin was defeated in his home Nandail constituency. Khaleque Nawaz Khan created history at age 27 by defeating the sitting prime minister and the Muslim League was wiped from the political landscape of the then East Pakistan. A. K. Fazlul Huq assumed the office of Chief Minister of East Bengal and drew up a cabinet containing many of the prominent student activists that were leading movements against the Pakistani state. They included Sheikh Mujibur Rahman from the Awami League, who served as commerce minister. Leaders of the new provincial government demanded greater provincial autonomy for East Bengal and eventually succeeded in pressuring Prime Minister Muhammad Ali Bogra, himself a Bengali, to endorse the proposed constitutional recognition of Bengali as an official language of Pakistan. The United Front also passed a landmark order for the establishment of the Bangla Academy in Dhaka.

As tensions with the western wing grew due to the demands for greater provincial autonomy in East Bengal, Governor-General Malik Ghulam Muhammad dismissed the United Front government on 29 May 1954 under Article 92/A of the provisional constitution of Pakistan. In September 1956, the Awami League formed a coalition with the Republican Party to secure a majority in the new National Assembly of Pakistan and took over the central government. Awami League President Huseyn Shaheed Suhrawardy became the prime minister of Pakistan. Suhrawardy pursued a reform agenda to reduce the long-standing economic disparity between East and West Pakistan, greater representation of Bengalis in the Pakistani civil and armed services and he unsuccessfully attempted to alleviate the food shortage in the country.

The Awami League began deepening relations with the United States. The government moved to join the Southeast Asia Treaty Organisation (SEATO) and Central Treaty Organisation (CENTO), the two strategic defence alliances in Asia inspired by the North Atlantic Treaty Organization (NATO). Maulana Bhashani, one of the party's founders, condemned the decision of the Suhrawardy government and called a conference in February 1957 at Kagmari, Tangail in East Bengal. He protested the move and the support lent by the Awami League leadership to the government. Bhashani broke away from the Awami League and then formed the leftist National Awami Party (NAP). Yar Mohammad Khan funded the 5-day Kagmari Conference and was the treasurer of the conference committee. The controversy over 'One Unit' (the division of Pakistan into only two provinces, east and west) and the appropriate electoral system for Pakistan, whether joint or separate, also revived as soon as Suhrawardy became prime minister. In West Pakistan, there was strong opposition to the joint electorate by the Muslim League and the religious parties. The Awami League strongly supported the joint electorate. These differences over One Unit and the appropriate electorate caused problems for the government.

By early 1957, the movement for the dismemberment of the One Unit had started. Suhrawardy was at the mercy of the central bureaucracy fighting to save the One Unit. Many in the business elite in Karachi were lobbying against Suhrawardy's decision to distribute millions of dollars of American aid to East Pakistan and to set up a national shipping corporation. Supported by these lobbyists, President Iskander Mirza demanded the Prime Minister's resignation. Suhrawardy requested to seek a vote of confidence in the National Assembly, but this request was turned down. Suhrawardy resigned under threat of dismissal on 10 October 1957. On 7 October 1958, President Mirza declared martial law and appointed army chief General Ayub Khan as Chief Martial Law Administrator. Khan eventually deposed Mirza in a bloodless coup. By promulgating the Political Parties Elected Bodies Disqualified Ordinance, Khan banned all major political parties in Pakistan. Senior politicians, including the entire top leadership of the Awami League, were arrested and most were kept under detention until 1963.

In 1962, Khan drafted a new constitution, modelled on indirect election, through an electoral college, and termed it 'Basic Democracy'. Huseyn Shaheed Suhrawardy joined Nurul Amin, Khwaja Nazimuddin, Maulvi Farid Ahmed and Hamidul Haq Chowdhury in forming the National Democratic Front against Ayub Khan's military-backed rule and to restore elective democracy. However the alliance failed to obtain any concessions. Instead the electoral colleges appointed a new parliament and the president exercised executive authority. Widespread discrimination prevailed in Pakistan against Bengalis during the regime of Khan. The University of Dhaka became a hotbed for student activism advocating greater rights for Bengalis and the restoration of democracy in Pakistan. On 5 December 1963, Huseyn Shaheed Suhrawardy was found dead in his hotel room in Beirut, Lebanon. His sudden death under mysterious circumstances gave rise to speculation within the Awami League and the general population in East Pakistan that he had been poisoned.

=== Struggle for independence (1966–1971) ===
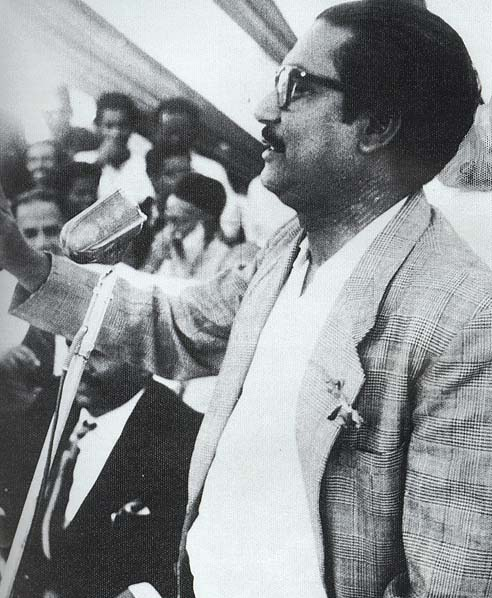
Rahman announcing the Six Points in Lahore, 1966

The 6-point demands, proposed by Mujib, were widely accepted by the East Pakistani populace, as they proposed greater autonomy for the provinces of Pakistan. After the so-called Agartala Conspiracy Case, and subsequent end of the Ayub Khan's regime in Pakistan, the Awami League and its leader Sheikh Mujib reached the peak of their popularity among the East Pakistani Bengali population. In the elections of 1970, the Awami League won 167 of 169 East Pakistan seats in the National Assembly but none of West Pakistan's 138 seats. It also won 288 of the 300 provincial assembly seats in East Pakistan. This win gave the Awami League a healthy majority in the 313-seat National Assembly and placed it in a position to establish a national government without a coalition partner. This was not acceptable to the political leaders of West Pakistan and led directly to the events of the Bangladesh Liberation War. The Awami League leaders, taking refuge in India, successfully led the war against the Pakistan Army throughout 1971. Leader Sheikh Mujib was arrested by the Pakistan Army on 25 March 1971, but the Bangladeshi people continued the fight to free themselves for nine months.

=== After independence (1971–1975) ===
After victory on 16 December 1971, the party formed the national government of Bangladesh. In 1972, under Sheikh Mujib, the party name was changed to "Awami League". The new government faced many challenges as they rebuilt the country and carried out mine clearing operations. The party had pro Pakistani newspaper editors arrested and shut down the nations' newspapers leaving only four in operation. Food shortages were also a major concern of the Awami League. War had damaged all forms of farming. The party aligned itself with the Non-Aligned Movement (NAM), and leaned towards the Soviet bloc. The party was accused of corruption by supporters of Pakistan. In 1974 Bangladesh suffered a famine: 70,000 people died, and support for Mujib declined. Bangladesh continued exporting jute to Cuba, violating US economic sanctions, the Nixon government barred grain imports to Bangladesh. This exacerbated famine conditions.

In January 1975, facing violent leftist insurgents Mujib declared a state of emergency and later assumed the presidency, after the Awami League dominated parliament decided to switch from parliamentary to a presidential form of government. Sheikh Mujib renamed the League the Bangladesh Krishak Sramik Awami League (BAKSAL), and banned all other parties. The consequences lead to a critical political state. BAKSAL was dissolved after the assassination of Sheikh Mujibur Rahman.

The move towards a secular form of government caused widespread dissatisfaction among many low ranking military personnel, most of whom received training from the Pakistani army. On 15 August 1975 during the time of Major General K. M. Shafiullah as a Chief of the Army Staff, some junior members of the armed forces in Dhaka, led by Major Faruk Rahman and Major Rashid, murdered Sheikh Mujibur Rahman and all his family members, including his wife and minor son. Within months, on 3 November 1975, four more of its top leaders, Syed Nazrul Islam, Tajuddin Ahmed, Muhammad Mansur Ali and A. H. M. Qamaruzzaman were killed inside the Dhaka Central Jail as they were on behalf of BAKSAL. Only Sheikh Hasina and Sheikh Rehana, daughters of Mujib, survived the massacres as they were in West Germany as a part of a cultural exchange programme. They later claimed political asylum in the United Kingdom. Sheikh Rehana, the younger sister, chose to remain in the UK permanently, while Sheikh Hasina moved to India and lived in self-imposed exile. Her stays abroad helped her gain important political friends in the West and in India that proved to be a valuable asset for the party in the future.

=== Struggle for democracy (1981–2009) ===
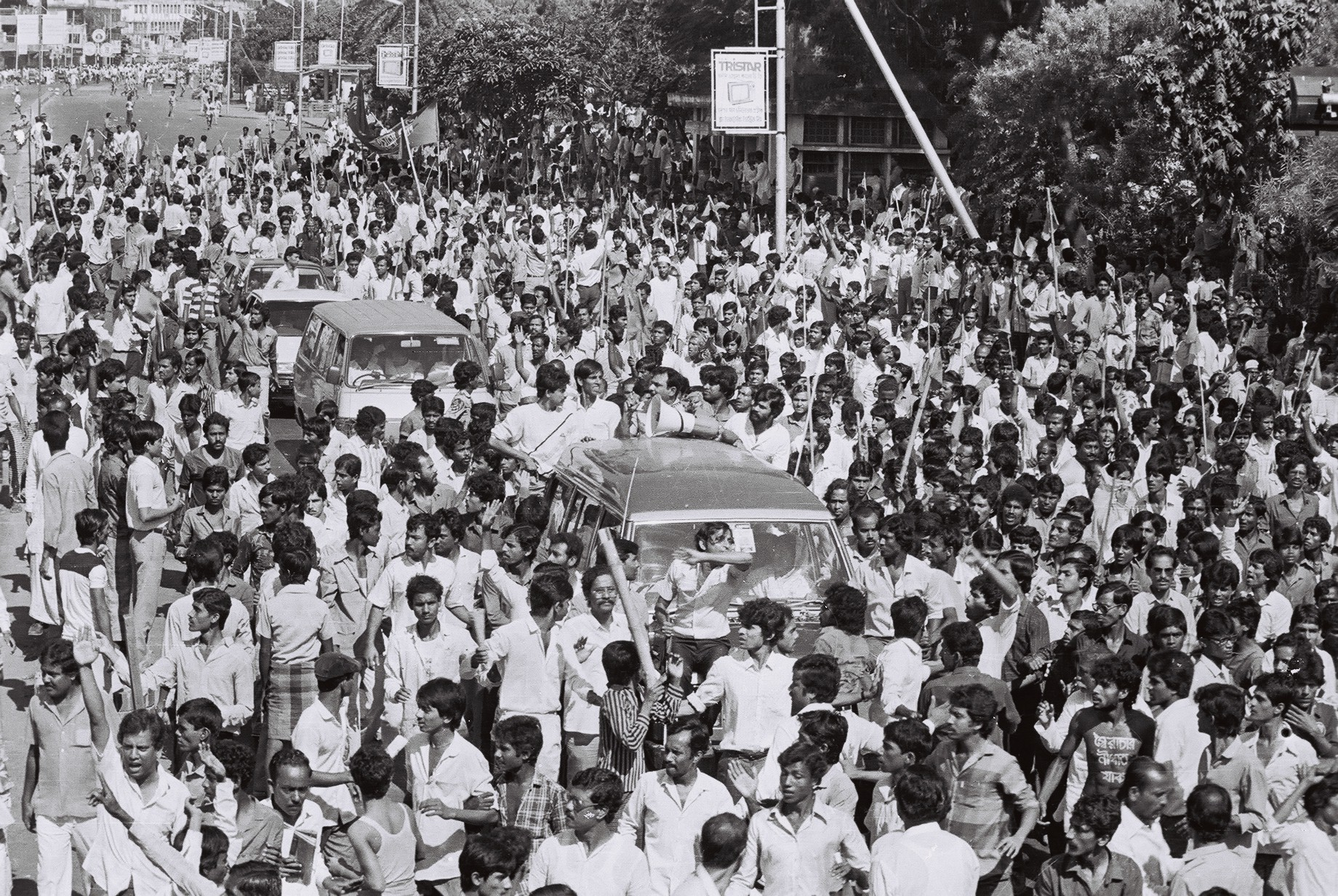
An Awami League rally held in Dhaka on 10 November 1987, shortly before activist Noor Hossain was killed by police.

After 1975, the party remained split into several rival factions and fared poorly in the 1979 parliamentary elections held under a military government. In 1981 Sheikh Hasina returned as Ziaur Rahman allowed her to return after the largest party faction, the Awami League elected her its president, and she proceeded to take over the party leadership and unite the factions. As she was under age at the time she could not take part in the 1981 presidential elections that followed the assassination of President Ziaur Rahman. Throughout the following nine years of military rule by Lieutenant General Hussain Muhammad Ershad the Awami League participated in some polls but boycotted most as Ershad did not believe in democracy. On 7 May 1986, Awami League participated in the general election staged by Ershad even though the other major political party and the winner of previous elections, the Bangladesh Nationalist Party boycotted. British observers including a journalists termed the elections a "tragedy for democracy" and a "cynically frustrated exercise".

The Awami League emerged as the largest opposition party in parliament in the elections in 1991, in which Khaleda Zia became the first female prime minister. AL's second term in office had mixed achievements. Apart from sustaining economic stability during the Asian economic crisis, the government successfully settled Bangladesh's long standing dispute with India over sharing the water of the river Ganges (also known as Padma) in late 1996, and signed a peace treaty with tribal rebels in 1997. In 1998, Bangladesh faced one of the worst floods ever, and the government handled the crisis satisfactorily. It also had significant achievements in containing inflation, and peacefully neutralising a long-running leftist insurgency in south-western districts dating back to the first AL government's time. However, rampant corruption allegations against party office bearers and ministers as well as a deteriorating law and order situation troubled the government. Its pro poor policies achieved wide microeconomic development but that left the country's wealthy business class dissatisfied. The AL's last months in office were marred by sporadic bombing by alleged Islamist militants. Hasina herself escaped several attempts on her life, in one of which two anti-tank mines were planted under her helipad in Gopalganj district. In July 2001, the second AL government stepped down, becoming the first elected government in Bangladesh to serve a full term in office.

The party won only 62 out of 300 parliamentary seats in the elections held in October 2001, despite winning 40% of the votes, up from 36% in 1996 and 33% in 1991. The BNP and its allies won a two-thirds majority in parliament with 46% of the votes cast, with BNP alone winning 41%, up from 33% in 1996 and 30% in 1991. In its second term in opposition since 1991, the party suffered the assassination of several key members. Popular young leader Ahsanullah Master, a member of parliament from Gazipur, was killed in 2004. This was followed by a grenade attack on Hasina during a public meeting on 21 August 2004, resulting in the death of 22 party supporters, including party women's secretary Ivy Rahman, though Hasina lived. Finally, the party's electoral secretary, ex finance minister, and veteran diplomat Shah M S Kibria, a member of parliament from Habiganj, was killed in a grenade attack in Sylhet later that year. In June 2005, the Awami League won an important victory when the AL nominated incumbent mayor A.B.M. Mohiuddin Chowdhury won the important mayoral election in Chittagong, by a huge margin, against BNP nominee State Minister of Aviation Mir Mohammad Nasiruddin. This election was seen as a showdown between the Awami League and the BNP. However, the killing of party leaders continued. In December 2005, the AL supported Mayor of Sylhet narrowly escaped the third attempt on his life as a grenade thrown at him failed to explode.

In September 2006, several of the party's top leaders, including Saber Hossain Chowdhury MP and Asaduzzaman Nur MP, were hospitalised after being critically injured by police beatings while they demonstrated in support of electoral-law reforms. Starting in late October 2006, the Awami League led alliance carried out a series of nationwide demonstrations and blockades centring on the selection of the leader of the interim caretaker administration to oversee the 2007 elections. Although an election was scheduled to take place on 22 January 2007 that the Awami League decided to boycott, the country's military intervened on 11 January 2007 and installed an interim government composed of retired bureaucrats and military officers. Throughout 2007 and 2008, the military backed government tried to root out corruption and remove Sheikh Hasina and Khaleda Zia of the AL and BNP respectively.

While these efforts largely failed, they succeeded in producing a credible voter list that was used in the 2008 Bangladeshi general election. The Awami League won as part of a larger electoral alliance that also included the Jatiya Party led by former military ruler Ershad as well as some leftist parties. According to the Official Results, Bangladesh Awami League won 230 out of 300 constituencies, and together with its allies, had a total of 262 parliamentary seats. The Awami League and its allies received 57% of the total votes cast. The AL alone got 48%, compared to 36% of the other major alliance led by the BNP which by itself got 33% of the votes. Sheikh Hasina, as party head, became the new prime minister. Her term of office began in January 2009. The second Hasina cabinet had several new faces, including three women in prominent positions: Dipu Moni (Foreign Minister), Matia Chowdhury (Agriculture Minister) and Sahara Khatun (Home Minister). Younger MPs with a link to assassinated members of the 1972–1975 AL government were Sayed Ashraful Islam, son of Syed Nazrul Islam, Sheikh Fazle Noor Taposh, son of Sheikh Fazlul Haque Mani, and Sohel Taj, son of Tajuddin Ahmad.

=== Second Hasina Government (2009–2024) ===
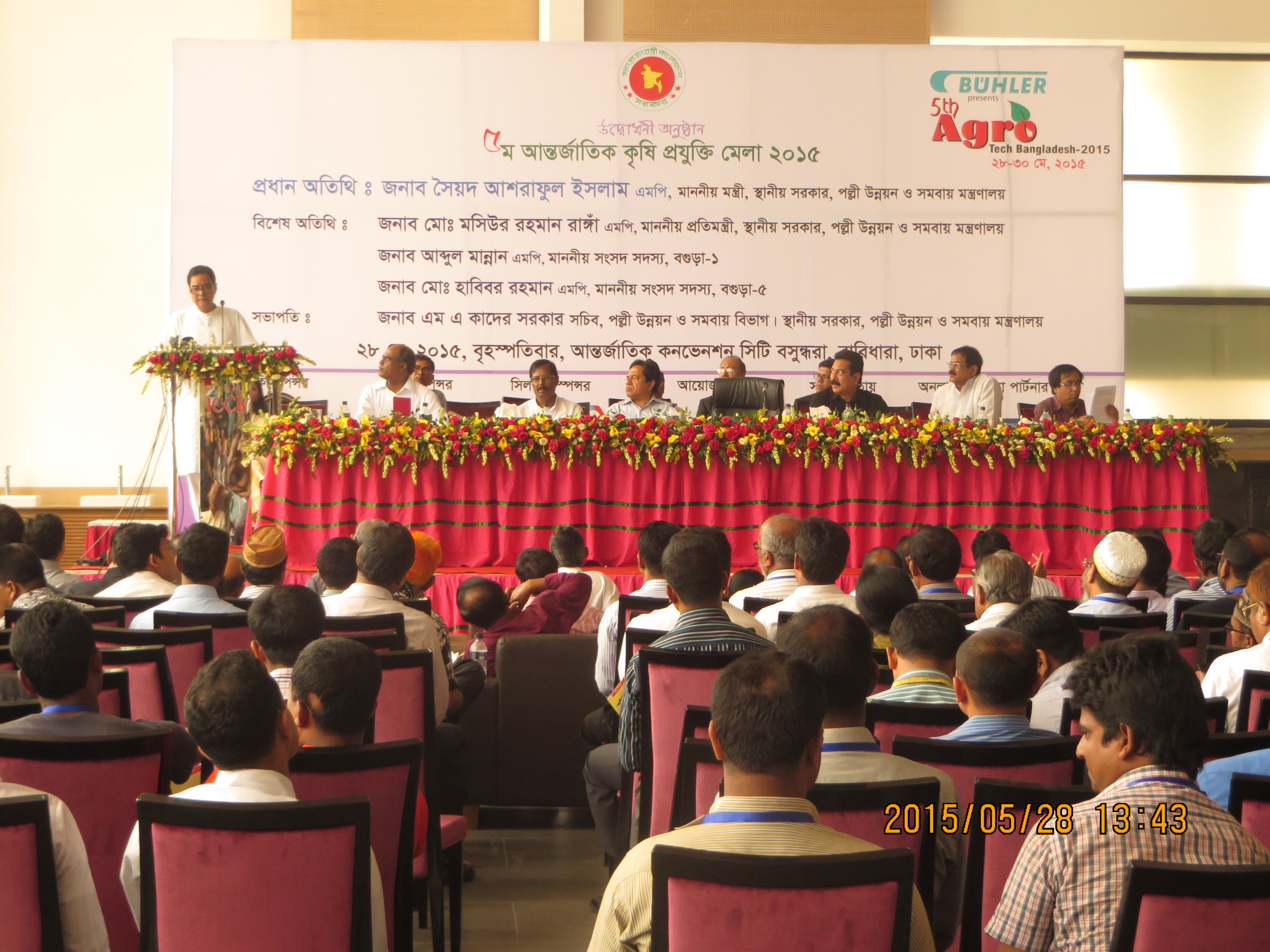
Sayed Ashraful Islam, General Secretary of the Awami League, speaking at the 5th Bangladesh Agro Tech Fair in Dhaka on 28 May 2015

Since 2009, the Awami League government faced several major political challenges, including BDR (Bangladesh Rifles) mutiny, power crisis, unrest in garments industry and stock market fluctuations. Judicial achievements for the party included restoring original 1972 constitution, returning secularism to the constitution, beginning of war crimes trials, and guilty verdict in 1975 assassination trial. According to the Nielsen 2-year survey, 50% felt the country was moving in the right direction, and 36% gave the government a favourable rating.

In the 2014 election the Awami League led alliance won a second term of which 154 Members (out of 300) of Parliament were selected where there were no election. Only 5% of voters cast their votes. The opposition and one of the most popular parties (BNP) boycotted the election for removing the caretaker government (neutral government) system from the constitution after completion of 5 years tenure. With 21 people dead due to the violence during the election, along with further human rights abuses and an absence of opposition, this was one of the controversial general elections in Bangladesh's history. This election was further tainted by arrests where dozens of opposition leaders and members were taken into custody. Amid this crackdown of opposition, in 2018, another election was held where BNP and all major opposition parties took part. That election was marred by allegations of widespread electoral fraud, harassment of political opposition and imprisonment of opposition activists. The opposition alleged the complicity of law enforcement forces in compromising the integrity of the electoral process.

On 7 January 2024, the twelfth National Parliamentary elections were held which were boycotted by BNP and major opposition parties. Transparency International Bangladesh (TIB) condemned this process as one-sided and farcical. The election saw Awami League again clinching a landslide victory, winning 224 out of 300 directly elected seats. The 62 elected members who contested the election as independents largely aligned with AL.

On 5 June 2024, the High Court of Bangladesh reinstated the controversial Job Quota System, sparking nationwide student protests. The Appellate Division imposed a stay on the ruling but protesters continued to carry on their movement unless the government agreed to their demands to take a firm step for reforming the quota system. Prime Minister Hasina ignited controversy by her statement: "If the grandchildren of freedom fighters don't get quota benefits, will those then go to the grandchildren of the Razakars? That's my question to the countrymen." Protesters were further galvanised at this comment. The Bangladesh Chhatra League, aided by police and other agencies, violently cracked down on the protesters, while government imposed internet shutdowns and curfews to stop the movement, which escalated instead. On 5 August 2024, millions of protesters defied curfew orders and marched towards Ganobhaban. Consequently, Hasina resigned and left Bangladesh for India, effectively ending the Awami League's continuous 15-year tenure.

=== July Uprising and banning (2024–present) ===
In the immediate aftermath of the fall of the AL government, many of its leaders went into hiding. The properties and residences of many AL leaders were looted, vandalised and set on fire. Many ministers and influential politicians from AL have been arrested and taken into remand. Many of them were prohibited from leaving Bangladesh. The bank accounts of many AL leaders and their families have also been frozen. The Chhatra League, the student wing of the Awami League, was officially banned by the interim Government of Bangladesh from all types of political and organisational activities and declared as a terrorist organisation on 23 October 2024. On 10 May 2025, the interim government banned all activities of the Awami League in cyberspace and elsewhere under the Anti-Terrorism Act until the International Crimes Tribunal completes the trial of the party and its leaders. In continuation of this, on 12 May 2025, the Election Commission of Bangladesh suspended the registration of the Awami League as a party.

In September 2026, Hasina announced that her cousin, Sheikh Selim, was serving as acting president of the Awami League in her absence as the most senior sitting member of the presidium.

== Ideology and policies ==
The National Emblem of Bangladesh; The four stars above the water lilly represent the four fundamental principles of Awami League that were enshrined in the first constitution of Bangladesh in 1972: nationalism, socialism, secularism, and democracy

As a big tent party, the party has been labelled as centrist, as well as centre-left. It has been described as secular, although this is disputed, social-democratic,, though this is also disputed, liberal, economically liberal, and neoliberal. Historically, its founding ideological base combined left-wing nationalism, and democratic socialism. The party's nationalist outlook is primarily concentrated in its fundamental principles and historical role of nationalism in the Independence War.

The ideology of Awami League has been evolved through political and socio-economic landscape of the country since its creation. In a 2024 interview, Party President Sheikh Hasina claimed that her party's ideology has been blended with pragmatism. The party's constitution states four fundamental principles guiding its philosophy and policies: democracy, socialism, secularism, and Bengali nationalism. The origins of these principles can be traced to Mujibism, the political thought of Sheikh Mujibur Rahman.

=== Secularism ===
Awami League espouses a secular philosophy, and depicts itself as a defender of secularism against Islamism. Most party leaders support the restoration of the original constitution of 1972 by removing Islam as the state religion. Citing a pragmatist approach, Awami League often compromises with the Islamist political parties in social issues. The party's tolerance of Islamic practices, the continued retention of Islam as the state religion, and silence during the attacks on secularists in Bangladesh has faced scritinity. Sheikh Hasina supported calls to remove the Statue of Lady Justice in Bangladesh Supreme Court. Many criticised these calls, arguing that Sheikh Hasina was bowing down to the pressure of Islamist political hard-liners.

In 2021, During a visit to a Puja venue Awami League's former Ministry of Information Dr Murad Hasan proposed to remove Bismillah (in the name of Allah) from constitution saying, “Bangladesh is a secular nation and will return to its 1972 constitution offered by Father of the Nation Bangabandhu Sheikh Mujibur Rahman. In 2022, former Law Minister Anisul Huq said the government wishes to restore the Constitution of 1972 and abolish the state religion. Former Minister of industries Amir Hossain Amu also tried to remove state religion. he stated “We wanted to abolish the state religion. But it could not happen as one or two members vetoed” According to a report by Al Jazeera, a significant number of Hindus think that they were not safe under Awami League rule as much anti-Hindu violence occurred and the ruling party members were involved in the harassment of Hindus.

=== Economy ===
Previously the party advocated for a socialist economy with democratic socialism. Inspiring from Soviet and Indian economic models, Awami League under Sheikh Mujibur Rahman implemented an economic system based on strict protectionism, state intervention and economic regulation under a planned economy and limited market activities, which was characterised as "neither capitalist nor socialist" in nature. During the 1980s, AL began to reposition itself towards more centre-left. Many ideologues strongly objected of this policy shift in the party. Nevertheless, in 1992, AL formally took a liberal economic approach. Since the 2010s, AL government has been very pro-market "which focused on boosting exports, attracting foreign investment, improving infrastructure, diversifying the economy, and enhancing the business environment." Sheikh Hasina's views on socialism have changed over time. In 1991, she described socialism as a failed system. In 2024, she said that "fulfilling the people's basic needs" had been her version of socialism.

=== Social position ===
The party has taken a slightly conservative position on social issues and promotion of Islam, including the establishment of Islamic Foundation Bangladesh, declaration of public holidays in the Islamic festivals and, more recently, the construction of 360 Model Mosques across the country. The party's position on the LGBTQ rights is also conservative, the AL-led Parliament refused to overturn Section 377, in 2009 and 2013. It was reported in 2017 that the party in government has been cracking down on the LGBTQ community. This has included the arrests of those accused of being homosexual.

=== Vision 2021 and Vision 2041 ===
Before the 2008 Bangladeshi general election, the Awami League announced in its manifesto, its "Vision 2021" and "Digital Bangladesh" action plans to transform Bangladesh into a fast-developing middle-income country by 2021. The policy was criticised as a policy emblematic of technological optimism in the context of Bangladesh and the state repression of media, low internet penetration, inadequate electricity generation. Prior to the 2024 Bangladeshi general election, Awami League announced Smart Bangladesh initiative associated with the Bangladesh Vision 2041 framework in its manifesto, a national strategic plan aiming to further develop the socio-economic standings of Bangladesh by transforming the country into a technologically advanced and sustainable society with low income inequality and high standard of living.

=== Environmentalism ===
In 2011, Awami League government passed the 15th amendment to the Constitution of Bangladesh wherein Article 18A was added which endeavours to protect and improve environment. Awami League under Sheikh Hasina also promised to protect the country's environment in its manifesto for the 2024 election. Her government also adopted the Bangladesh Delta Plan 2100, an "adaptation-based technical and economic master plan, which has considered the effects of water resources management, land use, environment, and climate change, and its interaction on the development results". Sheikh Hasina's government has been praised for combating natural calamities, greening her country and promoting international consciousness regarding climate change.

=== Foreign policy ===
During the premiership of Sheikh Mujibur Rahman between 1972 and 1975, Rahman's personal influence in the country's foreign policy was instrumental. Rahman himself wanted to make his country as the Switzerland of Asia. His government was successful in obtaining recognition from the major countries of the world before 15 August 1975, although the People's Republic of China and Saudi Arabia recognised Bangladesh just after 15 August. Awami League is often described as pro-India. "Bangladesh has enjoyed a good relationship with India under PM Sheikh Hasina". After Awami League formed government under Hasina in 1996, her government adopted an India-oriented foreign policy. This continued since 2009, when she secured power for the second time. In 2015, Hasina signed a historic land exchange agreement with Indian Prime Minister Narendra Modi which resolved the decade-long India–Bangladesh enclaves problem. Awami League continued good relationship with China. "Hasina has adroitly balanced ties with both India and China". Sheikh Hasina government allowed Rohingyas to take refuge in Bangladesh, for which she received credit and praise in home and abroad. Awami League continues to support Palestinian cause. In 1972, Awami League government officially rejected the Israeli recognition of Bangladesh. In 2014, Sheikh Hasina said, "We have been continuing our support to the Palestinians and occupation of their land by the Israelis is never acceptable".

=== Voter base ===
As a big tent party, the AL is not committed to a specific group and tries to appeal to a greater population. According to the political scientist Rounaq Jahan, due to AL's formal commitment to secularism and pluralism, it has maintained a greater support base among the religious and ethnic minorities. Traditionally, AL also enjoyed support from the rural areas, but in recent years, the party has also picked up support from the urban middle classes and business groups.

== Organisation ==
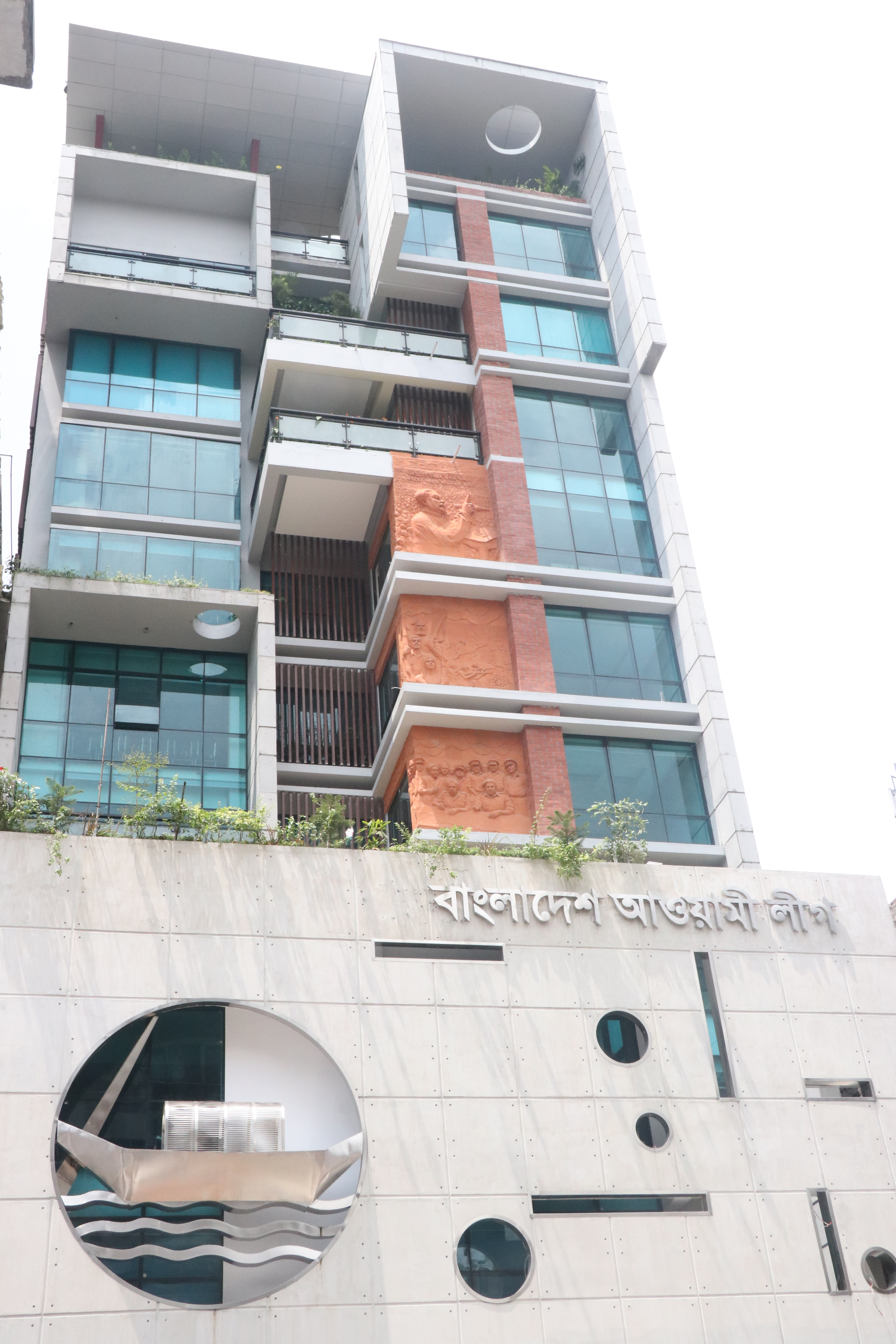
Bangladesh Awami League headquarters located at Shaheed Abrar Fahad Avenue, Dhaka. It was heavily vandalised and set-on fire following the July Revolution now currently abandoned.

=== Constitution ===
The Constitution of the Bangladesh Awami League (Bengali: বাংলাদেশ আওয়ামী লীগ এর গঠনতন্ত্র, romanised: Bānlādēśa ā'ōẏāmī līgēra gaṭhanatantra) has 24 Articles and includes contents of General Programme, Membership, Organization System, Central Organizations, Name, Aims and Objectives, Fundamental Principles, Commitments. In accordance with the changing situation and tasks, revisions were made in some of the articles at the National Conference.

=== National Conference ===
The National Conference NC (Bengali: জাতীয় সম্মেলন, romanised: Jātīẏô shôm'mēlôn) is the party's highest body, and, since the 1st National Conference in 1949, has been convened every three years (sometimes on an irregular basis). According to the party's constitution, the National Conference may be postponed on except "under extraordinary circumstances." The party constitution gives the NC following responsibilities:

- electing the President
- electing the general secretary
- examining the report of the outgoing Central Working Committee
- discussing and enacting party policies
- revising the party's constitution

In practice, the party councillors and delegates rarely discuss issues at length at the National Conference. Most substantive discussion takes place before the Conference, in the preparation period, among a group of top party leaders. In between National Conferences, the Central Working Committee is the highest decision-making institution.

=== Central Working Committee ===
Main office holders

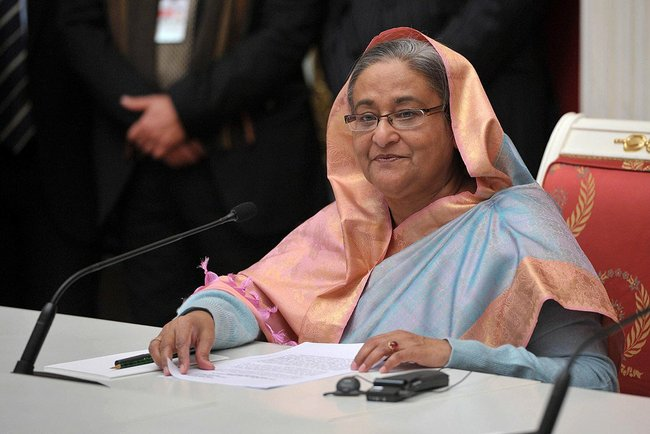
Sheikh Hasina Wazed, President of AL since 16 February 1981

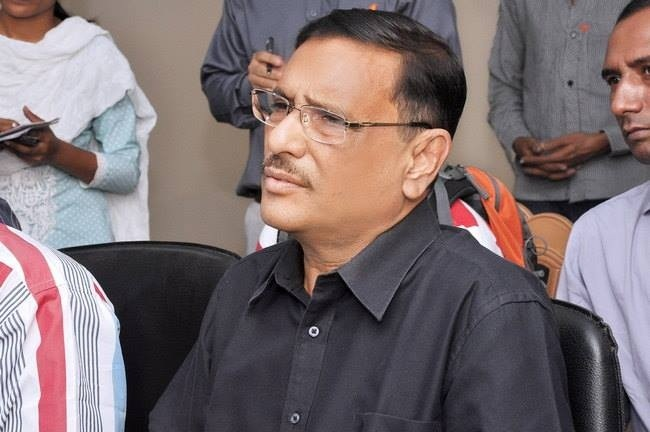
Obaidul Quader, General Secretary of AL since 23 October 2016

The Central Working Committee (Bengali: কেন্দ্রীয় কার্যনির্বাহী সংসদ, romanised: Kēndrīẏa kāryanirbāhī sansada) of the Awami League is a political body that comprises the top leaders of the Party. It is currently composed of 81 full members and 29 alternate members. Members are elected once every three years by the National Conference of the Bangladesh Awami League. The Central Working Committee is made up of the following:

- The Party Presidium:
  - The Party President
  - 17 Presidium Members
  - The General Secretary
  - 4 Joint General Secretary
  - The Treasurer
- 28 Additional Members
- 29 Secretaries of the Sub Committee
1. Office Secretary
2. Liberation War Affairs secretary
3. Finance and planning secretary
4. International Affairs secretary
5. Law Affairs secretary
6. Agriculture and Co-operation secretary
7. Information and Research secretary
8. Relief and Social welfare secretary
9. Religious Affairs secretary
10. Press and Publications secretary
11. Forest and Environment secretary
12. Science and Technology affairs secretary
13. Women Affairs secretary
14. Youth and Sports affairs secretary
15. Education and Human resource secretary
16. Industries and Commerce secretary
17. Labour and Manpower secretary
18. Cultural Affairs secretary
19. Health and Population secretary
20. 8 Organising secretaries
21. Deputy Office-secretary
22. Deputy Press-secretary

and

- 10 Parliamentary Committee member

=== Members of the Presidium ===
The Presidium of the Awami League is the topmost decision-making body of the Awami League, and in turn, as Awami League has been the sole ruling party of Bangladesh since 2009, unofficially one of the highest and most important decision-making bodies of the country itself. The members of the Presidium are as follows:

1. Sheikh Hasina
2. Sheikh Fazlul Karim Selim
3. Kazi Zafarullah
4. Mosharraf Hossain
5. Muhammad Abdur Razzaque
6. Muhammad Faruk Khan
7. Shajahan Khan
8. Jahangir Kabir Nanak
9. Abdur Rahman
10. A. H. M. Khairuzzaman Liton
11. Mofazzal Hossain Chowdhury Maya
12. Md. Qamrul Islam
13. Simeen Hussain Rimi
14. Mostafa Jalal Mohiuddin

=== Advisory Council ===
Almost 38 Advisory Council (Bengali: উপদেষ্টা পরিষদ, romanised: Upadēṣṭā pariṣada) members working as party's think-tank and are not Part of the Central Working Committee The Awami League Advisory Council is the highest governing of Bangladesh Awami League.

=== Centre for Research and Information ===
The Centre for Research and Information (CRI) is the think-tank and research cell of the Awami League. The foundation offers political education, conducts scientific fact-finding research for political projects, grants scholarships to gifted individuals, researches the history of Awami League, and supports and encourages youth, international understanding, and development-policy co-operation.

=== Activities ===
- Let's Talk
- Policy Café
- CRI Junction
- Young Bangla and CRI: the Young Bangla Programme comprises the several schemes, acting as a flexible space for the youth, thousands of individuals and youth-led organisations, supporting them with resources and capacity enhancement trainings.

=== Wings ===
Type	Official name	Common term
Student wing	Bangladesh Chhatra League	Chhatra League
Youth wing	Bangladesh Awami Jubo League	Jubo League
Women's wing	Bangladesh Mohila Awami League	Mohila League
Farmer wing	Bangladesh Krishak League	Krishak League
Trade union wing	Bangladesh Jatiya Sramik League	Jatiya Sramik League
Volunteer wing	Bangladesh Awami Swechasebak League	Swechasebak League
Female youth wing	Bangladesh Jubo Mohila League	Jubo Mohila League
Fisherman wing	Bangladesh Awami Matsyajeebi League	Matsyajeebi League
Doctor wing	Swadhinata Chikitshak Parishad	—N/a

== Leadership ==
=== Presidents and general secretaries (1949–present) ===
President	Elected (National Council; NC)	In Office	Term length	General Secretary
Abdul Hamid Khan Bhashani	NC: 1949, 53, 55	23 June 1949 – 27 July 1956	7 years, 34 days	Shamsul Huq; Sheikh Mujibur Rahman
Huseyn Shaheed Suhrawardy	(acting)	27 July 1956 – 10 October 1957	1 year, 75 days	Sheikh Mujibur Rahman
Abdur Rashid Tarkabagish	NC: 1957, 64	10 October 1957 – 25 January 1966	8 years, 107 days	Sheikh Mujibur Rahman
Sheikh Mujibur Rahman	NC: 1966, 70, 72	25 January 1966 – 18 January 1974	7 years, 358 days	Tajuddin Ahmad; Zillur Rahman
Muhammad Qamaruzzaman	NC: 1974	18 January 1974 – 24 February 1975	1 year, 37 days	Zillur Rahman
Dissolution (see: BAKSAL)
Syeda Zohra Tajuddin (Convenor)	Special Council: 1977	4 April 1977 – 16 February 1978	318 days	None
Abdul Malek Ukil	NC: 1978	16 February 1978 – 16 February 1981	3 years, 0 days	Abdur Razzaq
Sheikh Hasina	NC: 1981, 87, 92, 97, 02, 09, 12, 16, 19, 22	16 February 1981– present	45 years, 279 days	Abdur Razzaq; Syeda Sajeda Chowdhury; Zillur Rahman; Abdul Jalil; Sayed Ashraful Islam; Obaidul Quader

=== State leaders (1971–present) ===
President of Bangladesh
Name	Term in office
Sheikh Mujibur Rahman	1971–1972
Abu Sayeed Chowdhury	1972–1973
Mohammad Mohammadullah	1974–1975
Sheikh Mujibur Rahman	1975 (Assassinated)
Khondaker Mostaq Ahmad	1975 (Deposed)
Abu Sadat Mohammad Sayem	1975–1977
Zillur Rahman	2009–2013
Mohammad Abdul Hamid	2013–2023
Mohammed Shahabuddin	2023–2026

Vice President of Bangladesh
Name	Term in office	Note
Syed Nazrul Islam	1971–1972	Acting party president (1966–1969) while Sheikh Mujibur Rahman was in prison

Prime Minister of Bangladesh
Name	Term in office
Tajuddin Ahmad	1971–1972
Sheikh Mujibur Rahman	1972–1975
Muhammad Mansur Ali	1975
Sheikh Hasina	1996–2001; 2009–2024(Deposed)

== Criticism ==
=== Authoritarianism ===
Awami League has been described as authoritarian by various national and international observers. In 2011, the AL-led government abolished the neutral non-partisan caretaker government system through passage of the 15th amendment of the constitution with its majority in Parliament, despite the protests of opposition parties, including the BNP. Since 2014, the freedom of the press in Bangladesh has declined dramatically. Awami League government targeted and detained many leading newspapers, television channels and pro-opposition journalists. According to Ali Riaz, "Awami League has established total control over state machinery and politics" since 2018. In a 2021 report Human Rights Watch said that in government the party has "doubled down on an authoritarian crackdown on free speech, arresting critics, and censoring media." This followed a prior violent crackdown on those that criticised the party in 2018. The general elections of 2014 and 2018 was criticised by the United States and the European Union for irregularities.

=== JRB atrocities ===
Jatiya Rakkhi Bahini, dissolved armed wing of Awami League, formed under the supervision of Sheikh Mujibur Rahman and active from 1972 to 1975, became involved in numerous charges of political killings, shooting by death squads, and rape. Human Rights Watch states that institutionalised violence committed by the Jatiya Rakkhi Bahini, established the culture of impunity and widespread prevalence of abuses by security forces in independent Bangladesh.

=== Promotion of "political nationalism" ===
Awami League has been accused for promoting "political nationalism", a form of radical nationalism. This form of nationalism emphasises on "exclusion based on political identity" over other factors, although it is "more inclined to accept religious diversity, cultural differences, and racial diversity within a state, but cannot accept political differences in ideology or party support". The party always styles itself as the "proliberation force" and positions itself as the "sole custodian" of the spirit of Liberation War, while diminishing the opposition's contributions to the Liberation War; which has been described as an attempt to delegitimise the opposition in the context of electoral politics. Critiques argue that this type of self-proclaimed interpretation of Bangladesh Liberation War results in an illiberal socio-political landscape in the country that marginalises the opposition.

== Electoral history ==
=== Jatiya Sangsad elections ===
Election	Leader	Votes	%	Seats	+/–	Position	Result
1973	Sheikh Mujibur Rahman	13,798,717	73.20%	293 / 300	New	1st	Supermajority government
1979	Asaduzzaman Khan	4,734,277	24.56%	39 / 300	▼254	▼2nd	Opposition
1986	Sheikh Hasina	7,462,157	26.16%	76 / 300	▲37	2nd	Opposition
1988	Sheikh Hasina	Boycotted		0 / 300	▼76	—N/a	Extra-parliamentary
1991	Sheikh Hasina	10,259,866	30.08%	88 / 300	▲88	▲2nd	Opposition
Feb 1996	Sheikh Hasina	Boycotted		0 / 300	▼88	—N/a	Extra-parliamentary
Jun 1996	Sheikh Hasina	15,882,792	37.44%	146 / 300	▲146	▲1st	Coalition government
2001	Sheikh Hasina	22,365,516	40.13%	62 / 300	▼84	▼2nd	Opposition
2008	Sheikh Hasina	33,634,629	48.04%	230 / 300	▲168	▲1st	Supermajority government
2014	Sheikh Hasina	12,357,374	72.14%	234 / 300	▲4	1st	Supermajority government
2018	Sheikh Hasina	63,805,379	74.96%	257 / 300	▲23	1st	Supermajority government
2024	Sheikh Hasina	32,113,240	63.85%	224 / 300	▼33	1st	Supermajority government
2026	Sheikh Hasina	Banned		0 / 300	▼224	—N/a	Extra-parliamentary

== See also ==
- Politics of Bangladesh
- List of political parties in Bangladesh
  - Bangladesh Nationalist Party
  - Bangladesh Jamaat-e-Islami
  - Jatiya Party
- Other wings
  - Bangladesh Awami Olama League
  - Suchinta Foundation
