= Awam =

Awam (Urdu: عوام) is the Urdu language word for common people or general public. In the early 20th century, the word was extensively used in the Indian subcontinent to refer to the general population. After Partition, the word remained in use in Pakistan, but within India, several new words derived from Sanskrit replaced it, such as Janata, Log or Lok (see: Lok Sabha), Gana or Praja. In India however, the word is used by non-Urdu Hindustani speakers, like for the Hindustani Awam Morcha.

Awami is the adjectival form for Awam.

Awam may refer to:

- Awam (newspaper), an Urdu-language daily newspaper based in Karachi, Pakistan.
- Awam-e-Hind, an Indian Hindi newspaper in India.
- Awam (film), a Hindi film released in 1987.

== See also ==
- Awami (disambiguation)
- Jana (disambiguation)
- Janata (disambiguation)
- Lok (disambiguation)
