= Bangladesh Awami Matsyajeebi League =

Fisherman wing of the Bangladesh Awami League

- বাংলাদেশ আওয়ামী মৎস্যজীবী লীগ
- Formation: May 22, 2004; 22 years ago
- Dissolved: 10 May 2025
- Location: Bangladesh
- Affiliations: Awami League

The Bangladesh Awami Matsyajeebi League (Bengali: বাংলাদেশ আওয়ামী মৎস্যজীবী লীগ, lit. 'Bangladesh People's Fisherman League') is the fisherman wing of the Bangladesh Awami League. It was established on 22 May 2004.

== History ==
On 22 May 2004, the Awami Matsyajeebi League was established as a fisherman organization with the slogan "Oikya Karma Pragati".

In 2019, Matsyajeebi League officially became an associate organization of the Awami League. The Matsyajeebi League formed a committee and held a council and finally got approval. A new 11-member committee and leadership of the Matsyajeebi League was also declared.

In April 2024, the Faridpur District unit of the Awami Matsyajeebi League distributed Eid gifts among underprivileged people.

In September 2024, it was reported that a local Matsyajeebi League leader, identified as Lizon Mollah, was killed in Narsingdi Sadar Upazila.

In September 2024, Bangladesh Police arrested Sajjad Islam Matabbar, the general secretary of the Tangail District unit of the Awami Matsyajeebi League. Sajjad was accused of being connected to a shooting incident that attempted to suppress student protestors, killing 1 on 4 August 2024.

== Controversies ==
Corruption

The Matsyajeebi League has been criticized for bribery, extortion, and corruption in various areas where its committees and units are present.

== See also ==
- Bangladesh Jatiotabadi Matsyajeebi Dal
