= Bangladesh Jubo Mohila League =

Female organization affiliated with Awami League

Bangladesh Jubo Mohila League বাংলাদেশ যুব মহিলা লীগ
- Founded: July 6, 2002; 23 years ago
- Dissolved: 10 May 2025 (Banned)
- National affiliation: Bangladesh Awami League

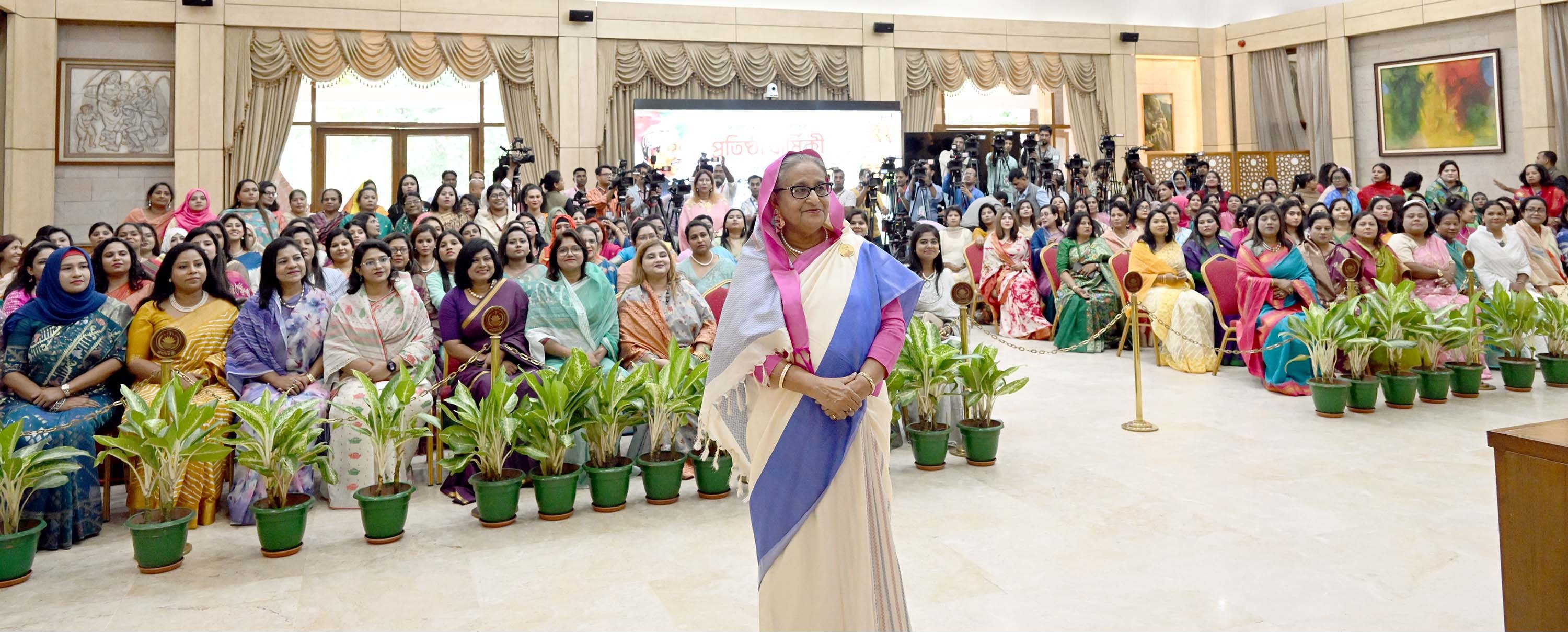
Bangladesh Jubo Mohila League Leaders with Prime Minister Sheikh Hasina at Ganabhaban, Dhaka 2024-07-07

Bangladesh Jubo Mohila League (Bengali: বাংলাদেশ যুব মহিলা লীগ, lit. 'Bangladesh Youth Women League') is the youth female wing of the Bangladesh Awami League (BAL).

== History ==
On 6 July 2002, Awami League leader, Sheikh Hasina formed Jubo Mohila League and a convening committee of 101 members were formed.

In December 2022, Sarwar Daisy was appointed as president in the third national council of Jubo Mohila League, Sharmin Sultana Lily was appointed as the general secretary of Jubo Mohila League.

In July 2023, two full central committees were announced of Mohila League and Jubo Mohila League by Obaidul Quader, Jubo Mohila League selected many former Chhatra League leaders for its full committee, and the Mohila Awami League chose senior leaders of Awami League, including many former MPs.

In October 2023, an rally and discussion in Bangabandhu Avenue of Awami League was organized by the Jubo Mohila League, Jubo Mohila League was tasked with curbing BNP activity and being vigilant.

In December 2024, Bangladesh Police arrested Asma Sultana Juthi, president of the Bhola upazila unit of the Jubo Mohila League in Pirojpur.

On 12 May 2025, The government of Bangladesh banned all activities of the Awami League and its affiliated organisations under the Anti-Terrorism Act.
