= Telangana Communist Party of India =

Minor Indian communist party

TCPI symbol - combines red (associated with the communist movement) and blue (associated with Dalit movement) colours, features portraits of Karl Marx, Jyotirao Phule and B.R. Ambedkar, a map of Telangana and a hammer and sickle

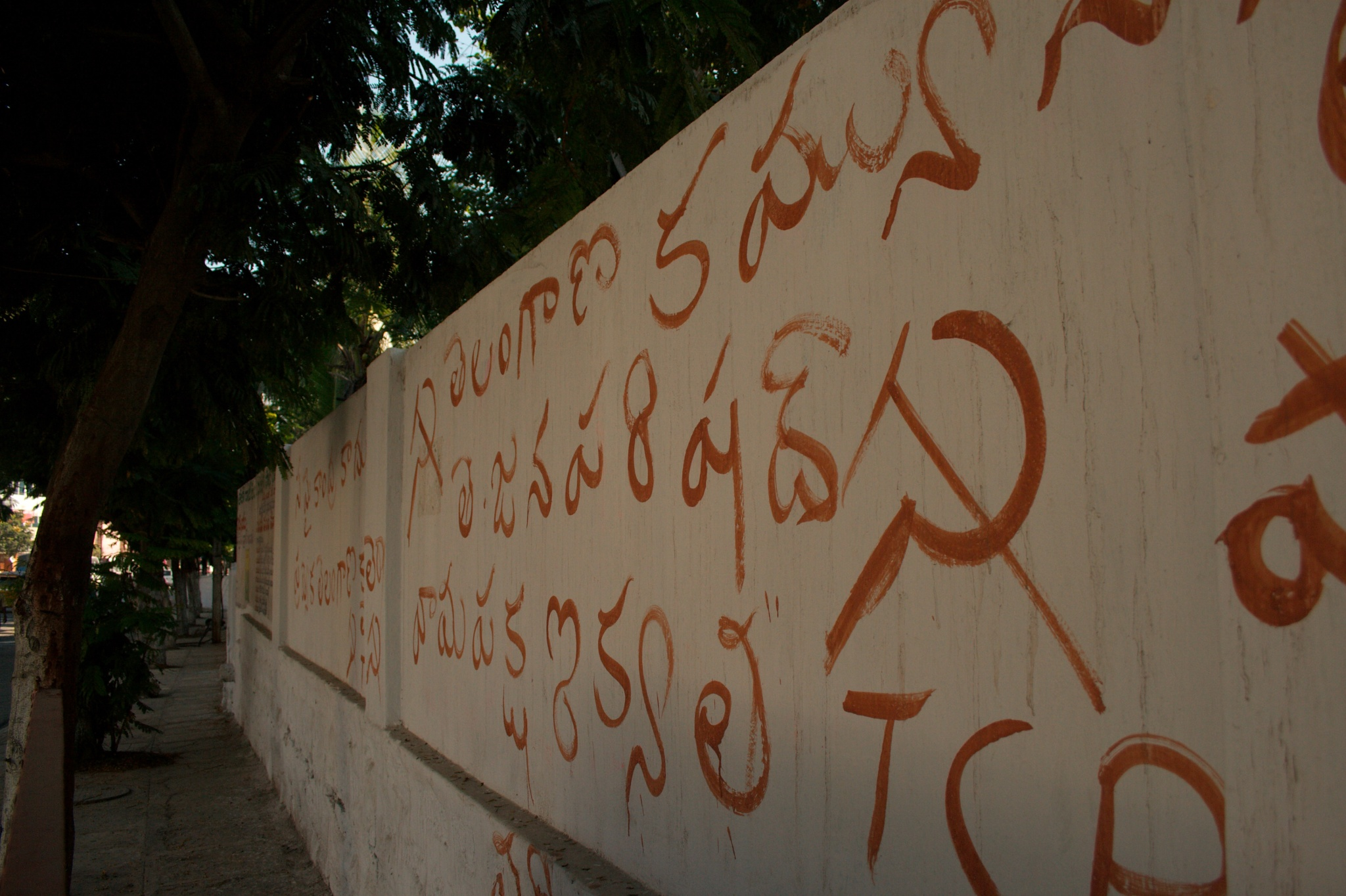
TCPI mural in Hyderabad

The Telangana Communist Party of India (TCPI) is a political party in the Indian state of Telangana. Before the division of Andhra Pradesh into two states, TCPI worked for the creation of a separate Telangana state. The leader of TCPI is S. Venkat Swamy.

TCPI was a member of Telangana Rashtra Sadhana Front.

TCPI was registered to participate in the 2005 municipal elections in Andhra Pradesh. It was allotted the 'cake' as its electoral symbol.

In April 2011, the Hyderabad and Ranga Reddy district committee members of the Marxist Communist Party of India (United) joined the TCPI in protest against the refusal of MCPI(U) to support the struggle for a separate Telangana state.
