= Lock and Key =

A lock and key is a pair of devices used to secure an object or location from unauthorized access.

Lock and Key or Lock & Key may also refer to:

== Arts, entertainment, and media ==
=== Film ===
- Taala Te Kunjee (Lock and Key), a 2017 Indian Punjabi-language film

=== Literature ===
- Lock and Key (novel), a 2008 novel by Sarah Dessen
- Lock and Key, a book series by Ridley Pearson

=== Music ===
==== Albums and EPs ====
- Lock & Key (album), a 2014 album by Cruel Hand
- Lock & Key, an EP by Wild Adriatic

==== Songs ====
- "Lock and Key" (Klymaxx song)
- "Lock and Key" (Rush song)
- "Lock and Key", a song by Nina Sky
- "Lock and Key", song by SNAFU from the album Situation Normal

== Science ==
- Reproductive mechanical isolation where two species can not mate because the genitals act as a lock and key, and the keys are incompatible
- Lock and key model, a model for the specificity of enzymes and other of biomolecules
- Locks-and-keys (computing), a program technique used to prevent dangling pointers

== See also ==
- Lock (disambiguation)
- Locke & Key (disambiguation)
- Key (disambiguation)
