= Bangladesh Statue of Lady Justice controversy =

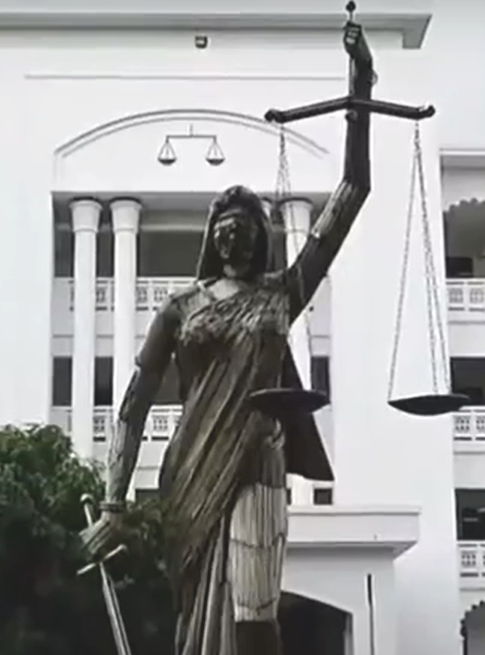
Statue of Lady Justice at the premises of the Supreme Court of Bangladesh

Bangladesh Statue of Lady Justice controversy is a controversy that surrounds the building of a statue of Lady Justice at the premises of the Supreme Court of Bangladesh. The controversy centers on the statue's depiction of the Themis, the Greek goddess of divine law, wearing a sari. Islamic groups like Hefazat-e-Islam Bangladesh and Bangladesh Awami Olama League consider the statue to be idolatry and have taken legal actions calling for its removal.

== Background ==
Bangladesh is a Muslim majority country with a legal system based on English common law. Bangladesh has seen rising tension between the religious hardliners and secularist supporters. A statue of justice was erected in the premises of the Bangladesh Supreme Court by the Government. The statue was that of Lady Justice or Themis, ancient Greek Titaness and the personification of justice and the goddess of wisdom and good counsel. The statue has blindfolds, is holding a sword, and wearing a sari. The sari is a local variation, the statue is usually wearing a gown.

=== Opposition ===
On 24 February 2017 thousands of Muslims protested in Dhaka against the statue. Supporters of Hefazat-e-Islam Bangladesh marched from the national mosque, Baitul Mukarram, after Friday prayers. A similar rally was held at the same time in Chittagong, the second largest city in Bangladesh. Hefazat-e-Islam Bangladesh later submitted a petition to the Supreme Court to demolish it, which was supported by the Awami League affiliated Bangladesh Awami Olama League and an online news editor. They called it conspiracy to undermine Islam in Bangladesh.

Sheikh Hasina, the prime minister of Bangladesh supported calls to remove the statue from the Supreme Court of Bangladesh with some people saying the government was bowing down to the pressure of those who have used religion for political ends.

=== Support ===
The Supreme Court officials defended the statue as a symbol of justice. The Dhaka Tribune wrote an article defending the statue. The Daily Star defended the statue and pointed out that only 7 percent of the Judges are female. The Hellenic Indian Society for Culture & Development (ELINEPA) in Athens described the statue of Themis as a symbol of justice and secularism in Bangladesh.

=== Removal and reinstallation ===
On 26 May, 2017, the statue was completely removed at 2am after a court decision and taken away by a truck at around 4am. Two days later, the statue was reinstalled in place a few hundred meters from its original location.

The order was given from the Supreme Court, and the difference was stated to be one where the statue was on display (initial location) and one where it was inside and therefore not 'on focus'.

=== Destruction ===
The statue was destroyed in August 2024 after the resignation of Prime Minister Sheikh Hasina and the fall of the Awami League government.
