= Locke & Key (disambiguation) =

Locke & Key is an American comic book series written by Joe Hill and illustrated by Gabriel Rodríguez.

Lock & Key may also refer to:

- Locke & Key (TV pilot)
- Locke & Key (TV series)

== See also ==
- Lock and Key (disambiguation)
