= Bangladesh Awami Olama League =

- Formation: 1996
- Dissolved: 10 May, 2025
- Headquarters: Bangladesh

Bangladesh Awami Olama League is a religious organization of Bangladesh that claims affiliation with Bangladesh Awami League. Although the Bangladesh Awami League denies any relationship, critics argue it uses platforms such as the Olama League for its own political benefits.

== History ==
The Awami Olama League was officially founded in 1996 on the directives of the Awami League president and later prime minister, Sheikh Hasina. Awami League officially denies involvement with it, although members maintain close ties with Awami League decision makers. Analysts argue that this gives the Awami League an "Islamic label" and serves as a "pocket organization" rather than a source of opposition.

The organization is currently divided into several factions, one led by Ismail Hossain Bin Helali, another led by Abdul Hasan Sheikh Shariatpuri, who are also rival Sufi groups. They accuse each other of being "agents" of Jamaat-e-Islami and being "illiterate". The two factions have often clashed violently and repeatedly.

In 2016, the organization demanded a stop to government funding of Pahela Baishakh and a ban on airing of Indian channels in Bangladesh.

In 2017, Olama League demanded removal of the placement of a statue of the Greek goddess of justice from the premises of the Supreme Court.

== See also ==
- Islam in Bangladesh
