= Janata Dal (Left) =

Janata Dal (Left) is a breakaway faction of Janata Dal (Secular) led by, Surendra Mohan and M.P. Veerendra Kumar. This party is formed as a result of a split in JD(S) happened due to the decision of H.D. Deve Gowda and H.D. Kumaraswamy's decision to form a government in Karnataka with the support of Bharatiya Janata Party.

The ideologically dedicated section of the JD(S) led by veteran Socialist leaders such as Surendra Mohan, M.P. Veerendra Kumar, Mrinal Gore and P.G.R. Sindhia has expelled Deve Gowda and his supporters for aligning with the BJP and betraying the JD(S).

Gowda responded by expelling Surendra Mohan and M.P. Veerendra Kumar, P.G.R. Sindhia joined the Bahujan Samaj Party and now returned to Janata Dal (Secular) after humiliating defeat of Bahujan Samaj Party in Karnataka in Karnataka Legislative Assembly elections.
