= Awami =

In Urdu language, Awami is the adjectival form for Awam, the Urdu language word for common people.

The adjective appears in the following proper names:

- Awami Colony, a neighbourhood of Landhi Town in Karachi, Sindh, Pakistan
- Awami Front, was a front of six Muslim political parties in Uttar Pradesh, India
- Awami Muslim League Pakistan, a Pakistani political party
- Awami National Party, a secular and leftist Pashtun nationalist political party in Pakistan
- Bangladesh Awami League, often simply called the Awami League or AL, one of the major political parties in Bangladesh
- National Awami Party, progressive political party in East and West Pakistan
- National Awami Party (Bhashani), split-off from National Awami Party in East Pakistan
- National Awami Party (Wali), Wali Khan faction of the National Awami Party was formed after the 1967 split in the original National Awami Party
- National Awami Party (Muzaffar) or Bangladesh National Awami Party, political party in Bangladesh, successor of the Wali faction
- Bangladesh National Awami Party-Bangladesh NAP, successor of the Bhashani faction in Bangladesh
- Pakistan Awami Tehrik, a political party in Pakistan that took part in general elections in 1990 and 2002.
- Awami Nastaliq, a typeface by SIL International

In Japanese cuisine, awami is synonymous with escargot, or edible snails.

== See also ==
- Awami Muslim League (disambiguation)
- National Awami Party (disambiguation)
- Janata (disambiguation)
