= Telangana Rashtra Sadhana Front =

Alliance of pro-Telangana statehood parties in Andhra Pradesh, India

Telangana Rashtra Sadhana Front, a front of dissident pro-Telangana statehood parties in the Indian state of Andhra Pradesh, formed ahead of the 2004 general elections. The member parties of Telangana Rashtra Sadhana Front were the Telangana Rashtra Party, the Telangana Janata Party and the Telangana Communist Party.

The convenor of Telangana Rashtra Sadhana Front was Katakam Mruthyunjayam. G. Innaiah of Telangana Rashtra Party was the co-convenor.
