= Rope lock =

Device used in theater fly systems

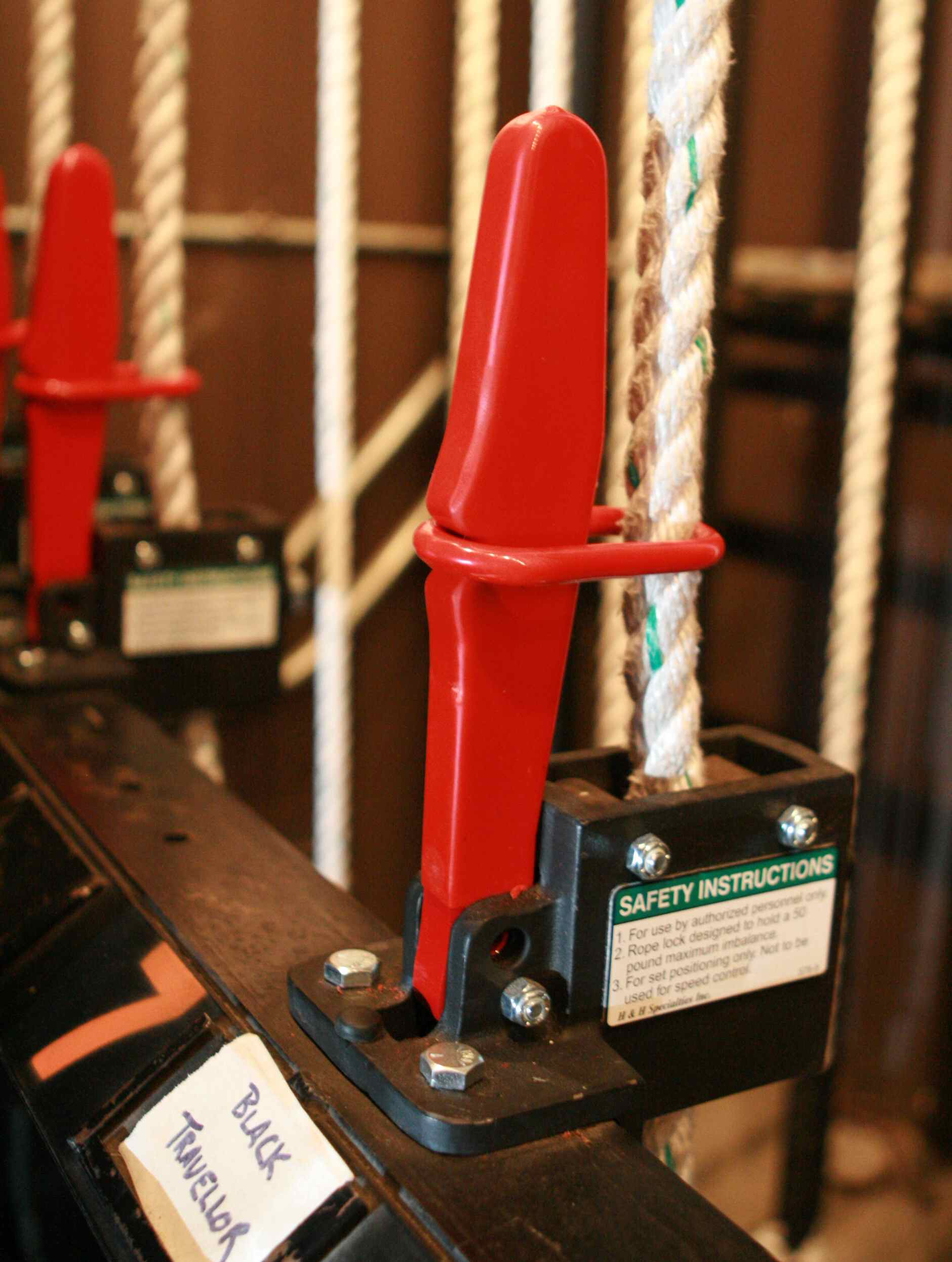
Rope lock, with oval locking ring engaged. The padlock hole is visible at the base of the handle.

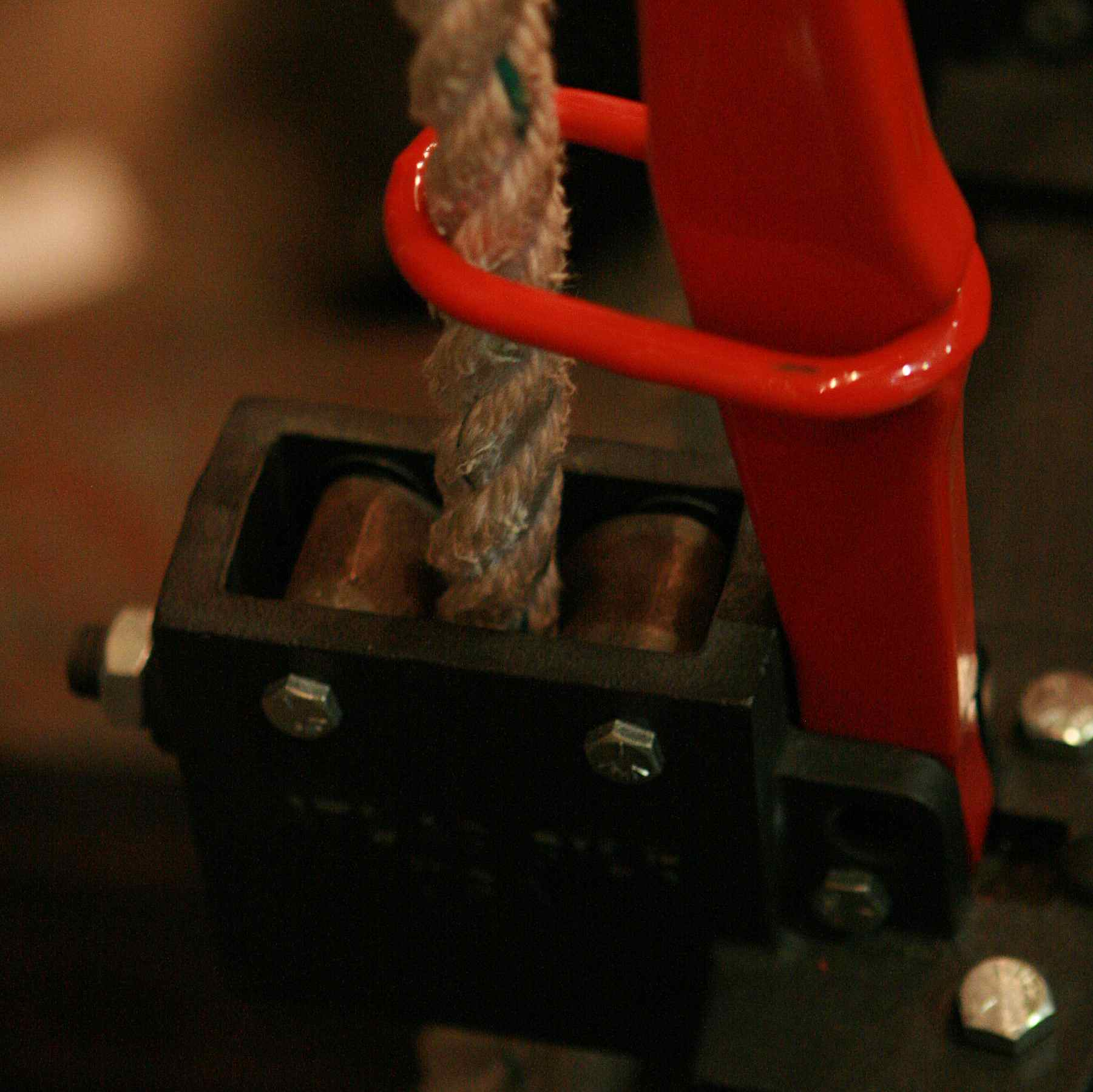
Metal cams grip the rope.

In a theater fly system, a rope lock is a device used to prevent a rope, and the line set it controls, from moving. A rope lock is controlled by a steel handle that engages the lock when vertical and releases it when horizontal. The handle is typically red powder coated or covered by a red rubber grip. A steel, oval-shaped safety ring encircles both the rope and the handle to ensure that the lock cannot be accidentally released. Rope locks are mounted to a locking rail, which provides structural support and holds them at a convenient level for the stage crew.

== Locking mechanism ==
Two metal cams, one stationary and one movable, are used to immobilize the rope. The position of the movable cam is controlled by the locking handle. When the handle is raised, the movable cam is pressed towards the stationary cam so as to grip the rope by compressing it between the cams. Conversely, the lock is released by lowering the handle, thus retracting the movable cam away from the stationary cam and releasing the grip on the rope. The position of the stationary cam can usually be adjusted with a socket head adjustment screw. This enables the spacing between the cams to be adjusted so that, when locked, the rope lock can accommodate ropes of different diameters.

Simple rope locks are designed to immobilize only balanced or slightly unbalanced loads; they will not hold significantly unbalanced line sets in place nor are they intended to be used for line set speed control. Most traditional rope locks are rated to hold a difference of 50 pounds (23 kg) or less. For this reason, proper loading technique is essential for safe operation. Misuse of the rope lock is a common source of rigging accidents, especially among students. More complex rope locks are available which will prevent unlocking if the line set is excessively unbalanced. These load-sensing locks reduce the probability of accidents, but may cause inconvenient loading situations and are more expensive than simpler locks. Rope locks are also available which are designed to hold unbalanced line-sets and act effectively as a brake.

Many rope locks provide a hole that will accommodate a padlock. When a padlock is installed, the control lever is locked in the vertical orientation and the line set cannot be moved. A rope lock is typically padlocked to prevent accidental movement of the set.
