= LOC =

LOC, L.O.C., Loc, LoC, or locs may refer to:

== Places ==
- Lóc, a village in Sângeorgiu de Pădure, Mureș County, Romania
- Lócs, a village in Vas county, Hungary
- Line of Contact, meeting place of Western and Eastern Allied forces at the end of World War II in Europe (1945)
- Line of Control, a ceasefire line between Indian and Pakistani-controlled parts of Kashmir (1972–present)
- Locwood stop, Hong Kong, MTR station code
- Line of Contact (Nagorno-Karabakh), formerly between Armenian and Azerbaijani forces in Nagorno-Karabakh (1994–2020)

== People with the name ==
- L.O.C. (rapper) (born 1979), Danish rapper
- Goldie Loc (born 1980), American rapper
- Spider Loc (born 1979), American rapper
- Tone Lōc (born 1966), American hip-hop artist and director
- Laughlin Phillips or Loc (1924–2010), American museum director

== Arts and entertainment ==
- LOC: Kargil, a 2003 Indian war film
- OG Loc, a fictional character in the video game Grand Theft Auto: San Andreas
- Steel Battalion: Line of Contact or LoC, a 2004 video game
- "Level of Concern", a 2020 single from Twenty One Pilots

== Medicine ==
- LOC, a medical acronym for Level of consciousness, a medical assessment of a patient's presence or degree of altered level of consciousness
- Laryngo-onycho-cutaneous syndrome

== Organizations ==
- LeMoyne–Owen College, a historically black college in Memphis, Tennessee
- Library of Congress, the de facto national library of the United States
- Liga Obrera Comunista or Communist Workers League, a Trotskyist group in Spain active from 1976 to 1990
- Loc Publishing, an imprint of VDM Publishing

== Other uses ==
- Lab-on-a-chip, a device that integrates multiple laboratory functions on a single chip
- Letter of credit LoC or L/C, is a letter from a bank or insurance company guaranteeing that a buyer's payment to a seller will be received on time and for the correct amount
- Limit of convection or equilibrium level, the height at which a rising parcel of air is at the same temperature as its environment
- Limiting oxygen concentration, the limiting concentration of oxygen below which combustion is not possible
- Source lines of code (SLOC), also known as lines of code (LOC), a software metric used to measure the size of a software program
- Liquid Organic Cleaner, a product of Amway from 1959
- LOC record, geolocation information resource record in Domain Name System
- Locs, a synonym for dreadlocks
- Look out circular, a message used by Interpol in India to stop wanted people from leaving the country
- Loss of control (aeronautics), one of the causes to aircraft accidents.
- Localizer (aviation)

== See also ==
- Loc River
- Lok (disambiguation)
- Lock (disambiguation)
