= Felicity Pulman =

Australian author

- Born: 1945 (age 80–81) Fort Victoria, Southern Rhodesia
- Occupation: Author
- Genre: Crime fiction, fantasy, historical fiction, young adult literature
- Years active: c. 1980s–present
- Notable works: Ghost Boy; Shalott trilogy The Janna Mysteries

Felicity Pulman (born 1945) is an Australian author with an interest in crime, history and fantasy. Her novels include Ghost Boy, the Shalott trilogy and A Ring Through, as well as her medieval young adult crime series The Janna Mysteries. Pulman has also penned articles on writing and the creative process. She has presented and given talks at schools, conferences and writers festivals.

== Biography ==
Born in Fort Victoria, Rhodesia, Pulman emigrated to Australia in 1970 and now considers herself an Australian. She began writing stories in primary school, but did not consider this as a serious career path until, at the age of 40, she went back to school to write the Higher School Certificate and then on to university to do a BA Communications degree, majoring in creative writing. An MA in Children's Literature followed, kindling a passion to write and tell stories for children and teenagers.

== Work ==
Her first young adult novel, a teen romance, was written for 'Dolly Fiction' under the pseudonym 'Anne Holmes', but all her novels thereafter have been published under her own name, beginning with Ghost Boy. Set partly at Sydney's Quarantine Station, with a flashback to the grisly history of the past, there is now a special Ghost Boy tour at the Quarantine Station for schools studying the novel. She also signed an option for a film based on the book. Her Shalott trilogy was inspired by the 'what if' questions arising from the poem, The Lady of Shalott, by Alfred Lord Tennyson, as well as the legend of King Arthur and his knights, and stories from the Mabinogian. What if it's possible for five Australian teenagers to rewrite the legend and save the life of the 'Lady of Shalott'? What if they find themselves rewriting their own lives and destiny instead?

Pulman has also written The Janna Mysteries now retitled and repackaged as The Janna Chronicles, set in England in the 1140s at a time of civil war. A six-book medieval crime series for teenagers set in the 1140s during the civil war between King Stephen and the Empress Matilda, these novels have been likened to the beloved Brother Cadfael chronicles of Ellis Peters. In The Janna Mysteries, a young girl sets out to avenge her mother's death, solving crimes and mysteries along the way, including the mystery of her own birth and identity. There are six novels in the series: Rosemary for Remembrance, Rue for Repentance, Lilies for Love, Willows for Weeping, Sage for Sanctuary and Thyme for Trust. The series has been rewritten for an adult audience and published by Momentum Books, Australia under the title The Janna Chronicles. The six books have been retitled: Blood Oath, Stolen Child, Unholy Murder, Pilgrim of Death, Devil's Brew and Day of Judgment. She has also published A Ring Through Time, a 'ghostly romance' set on Norfolk Island, with a flashback to the Second Penal Settlement there. A Ring Through Time novel won the Society of Women Writers biennial book award in the children/YA fiction category and, more recently, was given a Highly Commended in the Davitt Awards from Sisters in Crime Australia. It is published by Harper Collins Australia. Most of her novels are on sale through her publishers or on amazon.com in either paperback or e-book format.

Pulman has also written nonfiction, including Wally the Water Dragon and The Little Penguins of Manly, the latter providing an insight into this unique penguin colony and how to protect and care for them. Her most recent novel is I, Morgana, a novel about one of the most reviled, enigmatic and fascinating of all the characters in Arthurian legend. It is published by Momentum Australia.

Pulman also writes crime and fantasy short stories, many of which have won awards and/or been published both in Australia and overseas.

== Personal life ==
Pulman is married, and has two children and six grandchildren.

== Bibliography ==
=== Books for teenagers and young adults ===
- Shalott trilogy: Shalott, Return to Shalott and Shalott: The Final Journey.
- A Ring Through Time (Harper Collins, Australia)
- The Janna Mysteries: Rosemary for Remembrance, Rue for Repentance, Lilies for Love, Willows for Weeping, Sage for Sanctuary, Thyme for Trust
- Love and Other Magic (Book 2) and The Dark Side of Magic (Book 3) based on the TV series Guinevere Jones.
- Three's a Crowd (Dolly fiction)

=== Books for primary school children ===
- Ghost Boy
- Wally the Water Dragon
- Surfing the Future
- Turning the Page
- The Little Penguins of Manly

=== Books for adults ===
- I, Morgana
- The Once and Future Camelot
- The Janna Chronicles (previously titled The Janna Mysteries): Blood Oath, Stolen Child, Unholy Murder, Pilgrim of Death, Devil's Brew, Day of Judgment.

=== Short fiction ===
- "Jungle juice". Andromeda Spaceways Inflight Magazine. 41: 46–51. 2009.

== Awards ==
- Wooden Horse Award, Fellowship of Australian Writers (for a first publication)
- Partners in Crime 'Queen of Crime' award for 'Wild Garlic', 1999
- Society of Women Writers Book Award, Young Adult category for Shalott, 2001
- KSP award for short story, 'A Chinese Garden', 2003
- Helen Wilson award for short story, 'Babes and Sucklings'
- Dymphna Cusack award for short story, 'The Great Tsongololo Race'
- CBCA Notable Book for Rosemary for Remembrance, Book 1 of The Janna Mysteries, 2006
- Premier's Reading Challenge, Victoria, NSW and South Australia
- Society of Women Writers Book Award, Young Adult category for Lilies for Love, 2007
- Society of Women Writers Book Award, Young Adult category for A Ring Through Time, 2013
- H/C Davitt Awards (Sisters in Crime Australia) for A Ring Through Time, 2014
- Inaugural Di Yerbury Writer's Fellowship, Society of Women Writers, 2014.
