= Asom Bharatiya Janata Party =

Indian political party

- Abbreviation: ABJP
- Founder: Hiranya Bhattacharya
- Founded: 15-05-2001
- Split from: Bharatiya Janata Party
- Ideology: Hindutva
- Political position: Right-wing

The Asom Bharatiya Janata Party is a break-away group of the Bharatiya Janata Party in Assam. ABJP was founded by senior BJP leader and former Deputy Inspector General of Police, Hiranya Bhattacharya in 2001. Bhattacharya had objected to the decision of BJP to align with the Asom Gana Parishad. They don't enjoy a very strong presence in Assam in the current political scenario. They identify themselves as right wing party, formed after strong disagreement of BJP Assam state members over the alignment with AGP which is also a state party.

Asom BJP contested the 2001 state assembly polls unsuccessfully.
