= Janata Dal (Bidhuri) =

- Leader: Ramvir Singh Bidhuri
- Founded: 30 March 1996
- Dissolved: 6 May 1996
- Split from: Janata Dal
- Merged into: Indian National Congress
- Delhi Legislative Assembly (1996): 3 / 70

Janata Dal (Bidhuri) was a faction in the Delhi Legislative Assembly. JD (Bidhuri) was formed after a split in the Legislative Assembly group of Janata Dal. JD (Bidhuri) was led by Ramvir Singh Bidhuri (National General Secretary of JD and leader of the JD group in the Delhi Legislative Assembly), flanked by fellow Members of the Legislative Assembly Parvez Hashmi and Mateen Ahmed.

JD (Bidhuri) broke away from JD on 30 March 1996. On 2 April 1996 JD (Bidhuri) requested the Speaker of the Delhi Legislative Assembly, Charti Lal Goel, to recognize them as a separate group. The request was granted immediately, as JD (Bidhuri) gathered at least one-third of the legislators of JD (the sole JD legislator that did not side with Bidhuri was Shoaib Iqbal).

On 17 April 1996 JD (Bidhuri) requested the Speaker to recognize the merger of JD (Bidhuri) with the Indian National Congress. The Speaker approved the merged on 6 May 1996.
