= Bangladesh Vision 2041 =

Socio-economic in Bangladesh

Bangladesh Vision 2041 is a national strategic plan to further develop the socio-economic standing of Bangladesh, formulated by the National Economic Council and issued by former Prime Minister Sheikh Hasina. As a part of four 5-year perspective plans to be undertaken between 2022 and 2041, Bangladesh aims to achieve high income status through industrialization. The initiative encourages expansion of manufacturing capacity and investment in human capital development to develop exports.

== Selected goals ==
- Graduation to upper middle income country by 2030 will be followed by high income country status by 2041
- Per capita income of $12,500 (more than $16,000 in 2041 prices)
- Maintain 9% GDP growth until 2031.
- Increase investment/GDP ratio to 46.9%
- Increasing tax revenue to 15% of GDP.
- Export diversification.
- Increase exports earnings to $330 billion.
- Bangladesh exported a total of $65 billion in FY 2022-23 compared to $52 billion in FY 2021/22.
- Increase life expectancy to 80 years.
- Extend universal health care to 75% of the population.
- Increase adult literacy rate to 100% by 2031.
- Free education for up to 12 years.

== Projections ==
Vision 2041
Sector	2022	2028 (projected)	2041
GDP (nominal)	$464 B	$805 B	$2,580 B
GDP (PPP)	$1,345 B	$2,298 B	$6,950 B
Per Capita (Nominal)	$2,754	$4,272	$16,000
Per Capita (PPP)	$7,985	$12,847	$43,160
Investment-to-GDP	30.76%	28.73%	46.9%
FDI	$2.4 B		$153 B
Exports	$67.08 B	$115 B	$330 B
Infra Investment	$100 B		$1,150 B

== See also ==
- List of megaprojects in Bangladesh
