= Smart Bangladesh =

Bangladeshi government initiative

Smart Bangladesh Official Logo

Smart Bangladesh is an initiative led by the Government of Bangladesh aiming to transform Bangladesh into a technologically advanced and sustainable society. Building on the foundation of the Vision 2021 initiative, Smart Bangladesh envisions the development of smart cities, smart agriculture, smart healthcare, smart education, smart energy, smart governance and smart institutions with the ultimate goal of creating a more prosperous, equitable, and sustainable future for the people of Bangladesh. The inauguration of the nation's elevated expressway marked a milestone toward the realization of a 'Smart Bangladesh'. Initiatives such as community and mobile clinics have been established to extend healthcare access, particularly in rural areas, with a focus on maternal health.

Although the day has been celebrated as Smart Bangladesh Day since 2022, the day was canceled by the interim government on 16 October 2024, after the fall of the Sheikh Hasina government on 5 August 2024.

== Pillars of Smart Bangladesh ==
1. Smart Citizens

2. Smart Government

3. Smart Economy

4. Smart Society
