= The Janna Mysteries =

Book by Felicity Pulman

The Janna Mysteries, a medieval crime series by Felicity Pulman, follows Janna (Johanna is her full name) and her quest to find her father in order to seek vengeance for the death of her mother. The novels are set in England in the 1140s during the civil war (see The Anarchy) between Empress Matilda and King Stephen of England. There are six books in the series: Rosemary for Remembrance, Rue for Repentance, Lilies for Love, Willows for Weeping, Sage for Sanctuary and Thyme for Trust.

The 2015 edition, aimed at the adult market, rebrands the series as The Jenna Chronicles, and the individual books have been rewritten with new titles: Blood Oath, Stolen Child, Unholy Murder, Pilgrim of Death, Devil's Brew and Day of Judgment.

== Book 1: Rosemary for Remembrance ==
Janna is learning to be a healer. She is being taught by her mother but she feels her mother is not giving her enough responsibility. They argue over this, and also because Janna wants to know the identity of her father. Her mother agrees to tell her but, before she can, she dies in mysterious circumstances. Janna suspects poison, and puts herself in danger trying to find out who was responsible. Suspects include the midwife, the apothecary, the priest and Robert of Babestoche. Helping her are the villein Godric, who is in love with Janna, and also the handsome nobleman, Hugh, who is attracted to Janna but must marry well as he has no property of his own. When her home is burned to the ground, Janna is forced to flee - but by then several secrets have been uncovered giving Janna some clues about her father's identity. She sets off to find him in order to avenge the death of her mother.

== Book 2: Rue for Repentance ==
Janna's house has been burnt to the ground by superstitious villages and she is on the run. Disguised as a boy she meets the fugitive Edwin, and together they find work at a manor farm, which Janna later discovers is managed by the handsome Hugh, nephew of Dame Alice who owns the property. All is not as it seems. A series of 'accidents' occur, marked by the presence of a sprig of rue; finally a child goes missing, and Janna vows to find him. But who can she turn to for help? Edwin, who stole from her in the forest? Godric, who has turned against her? Or Hugh, who stands to gain everything if the child dies? Janna needs all her wits and common sense to solve the mystery of the child's disappearance - but time is running out, for both of them!

== Book 3: Lilies for Love ==
On the run from Robert of Babestoche, the man who will stop at nothing, even murder, to hide his secret, Janna takes refuge at Wiltune Abbey. There she desperately seeks to learn how to read, so that she can uncover the truth about her unknown father. But first there are mysteries to be solved. Who is the newcomer asking questions about Janna? Who stabbed the lord Hugh at St Edith's fair? Was the knife meant for Janna, or will Hugh's friendship with the beautiful Emma have disastrous consequences for them all? Who is destroying a precious manuscript and who is leaving lilies at the shrine of St Edith? The civil war between King Stephen and Empress Matilda has reached a crucial point, and Janna meets the empress when she comes to the abbey, a meeting that will open her eyes to a whole new world and further discoveries about her identity.

== Book 4: Willows for Weeping ==
In Willows for Weeping, Janna leaves the abbey with a group of pilgrims heading to Amesbury, hoping to uncover more about her mother's past. However, a stolen relic and a dead man with a mysterious message complicate the journey, especially when the leader of the pilgrims is found dead at Stonehenge. A charismatic pilgrim captures Janna's heart, particularly when he suggests that he knows something about her father's identity. Together, they travel with a group of jongleurs toward Winchester. When the missing message suddenly reappears, things take a turn for the worse as Janna is forced to choose between love and duty.

== Book 5: Sage for Sanctuary ==
1141 - England is divided by the bitter civil war between King Stephen and the Empress Matilda. Janna's quest to find her father has brought her to the heart of the royal court at Winchestre, solving many crimes and mysteries along the way. But the mystery of her own birth and her mother's death are secrets that put both her life (and her heart) in danger. How can Janna choose between the two men who love her when her purse has been stolen, she's lost all proof of her real identity, and she's working as a lowly drudge in a tavern to support herself? When sabotage threatens the tavern's future, Janna needs to find out the truth. Instead she finds herself fighting for her life against those who would silence her forever.

== Book 6: Thyme for Trust ==
Janna's quest to avenge her mother's death is nearing completion, but there are more challenges ahead as she comes to realise the threat she poses to her new family. Fearing for her life, Janna accompanies her father to Oxeneford where the Empress Matilda is under siege from King Stephen. Janna wants the freedom to act, to follow her heart, which puts her at odds with her father who is negotiating her marriage to the king's favourite. When the man she truly loves is accused of murder, Janna has one last crime to solve - until the siege of Wiltune turns her life upside down and changes everything.
