= Jana =

Jana may refer to:

== Entertainment ==
- Jana (film), a 2004 Tamil film by Shaji Kailas
- Jana (singer) (born 1974), Serbian singer
- Jana (Native American singer), née Jana Mashonee
- Jana of the Jungle, animated series created by Doug Wildey for Hanna-Barbera Productions
- Jana, a character in the television series Containment
- "Jana", a single by Killing Joke from the album Pandemonium
- Jana Berzelius the titular character in 2024 TV series, Jana: Marked for Life and a character in the related book Märkta för livet (2013)

== Other ==
- Jana (given name), a given name (and list of people with the given name)
- Jana (brand), a brand of drinks
- Jana (moth), a genus of moths
- Jana (Vedic period), a term for tribes in ancient India
- Jana Bhava (knowledge), a sutra and Putanjali's discourse related to the basic tenets of Yoga and is wisdom
- Jamahiriya News Agency or JANA, Libya's state news agency (1964–2011)
- Diana (mythology), also called Jana, the ancient Roman goddess of the moon, the hunt, and chastity

== See also ==
- Jana Gana Mana (disambiguation), the national anthem of India
- Janna (disambiguation)
- Jhana or dhyana, meditation in Buddhism
- Bharatiya Jana Sangh or Jana Sangh (lit. 'People's Association'), former political party in India, precursor to the Bharatiya Janata Party
