= MCFA =

MCFA may refer to:

- Medium-chain fatty acid, a fatty acid with an aliphatic tail of 6–12 carbon atoms
- Mitsubishi Caterpillar Forklift America Inc, now Mitsubishi Caterpillar Forklifts
- Ministry of Culture and Fine Arts (Cambodia)
- Malaysian Chinese Football Association, affiliated to Football Association of Malaysia
