= Mitsubishi Logisnext =

Transportation equipment brand

Mitsubishi Logisnext Co., Ltd.
- Formerly: Mitsubishi Nichiyu Forklift Co., Ltd.
- Company type: Public
- Traded as: TYO: 7105
- ISIN: JP3753800006
- Industry: Transportation Equipment
- Founded: August 4, 1937; 88 years ago
- Headquarters: Nagaokakyō, Kyoto, Japan
- Key people: Yuichi Mano (president and CEO)
- Products: Forklift; Container crane; Automated guided vehicle; Automated storage and retrieval system; Warehouse management system
- Brands: Mitsubishi Forklift Trucks; UniCarriers; Nichiyu; CAT Lift Trucks; TCM; Rocla
- Revenue: ¥433 billion (2017)
- Total equity: ¥62.4 billion (2017)
- Number of employees: 10,600 (2017)
- Parent: Mitsubishi Heavy Industries Forklift, Engine & Turbocharger Holdings, Ltd.
- Website: www.logisnext.com/en/

Mitsubishi Logisnext Co., Ltd. is the brand name used for a range of materials handling products manufactured and distributed by Mitsubishi Heavy Industries (MHI) and several of its Mitsubishi Caterpillar Forklifts subsidiaries: MLE Mitsubishi Logisnext Europe, MLA Mitsubishi Logisnext Americas, MLAP Mitsubishi Logisnext Asia Pacific, and MLF Mitsubishi Logisnext Forklift (Shanghai).

== History ==
The Mitsubishi Forklift Trucks brand was formed in 1992 when MHI entered a joint venture with Caterpillar Inc.

In February 2013, Mitsubishi Forklift Trucks has signed an agreement with the Japanese company Nichiyu to create Mitsubishi Nichiyu Forklift Co., Ltd.

As of 2018, Mitsubishi Forklift Trucks operates as a subsidiary of Mitsubishi Logisnext.

== Products ==
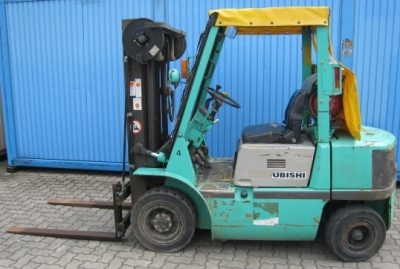
Mitsubishi FG25

Mitsubishi Forklift Trucks products cover a range of counterbalance forklift trucks and warehouse equipment, including:

• IC engine counterbalance trucks (diesel and LPG)

• Electric counterbalance trucks

• Powered pallet trucks

• Stackers

• Order pickers

• Reach and multi-way trucks

Although many of the designs and components are common to all regions, there are some differences in the product ranges across continents.

== Production facilities ==
Worldwide headquarters:

- Nagaokakyō, Japan

Manufacturing sites:

- Dalian, China
- Houston, Texas
- Järvenpää, Finland
- Marengo, Illinois
- Ōmihachiman, Japan
- Pamplona, Spain
