= Wings of Hope =

Wings of Hope may refer to:

- Wings of Hope (charity), US humanitarian aviation organization established in 1963; uses aircraft to aid people around the world
- Wings of Hope (film), 1998 documentary film directed by Werner Herzog, about a woman who survived the crash of LANSA flight 508
- Wings of Hope Children's Charity, an education-oriented charity founded in 2003, and operating India, Malawi, and the United Kingdom
