= Long reach excavator =

Type of excavator

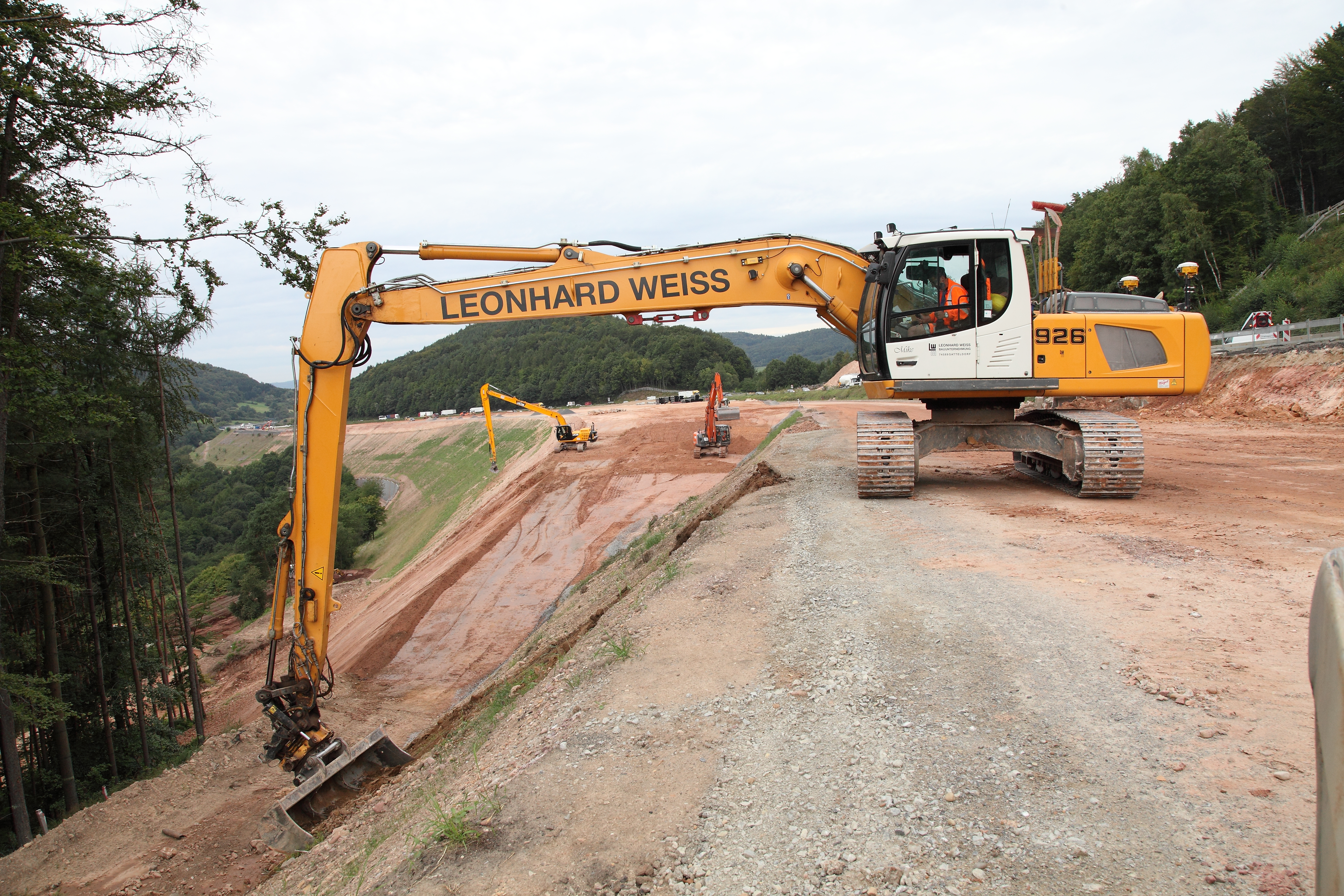
A long reach excavator used to move earth from a slope below the base of the vehicle

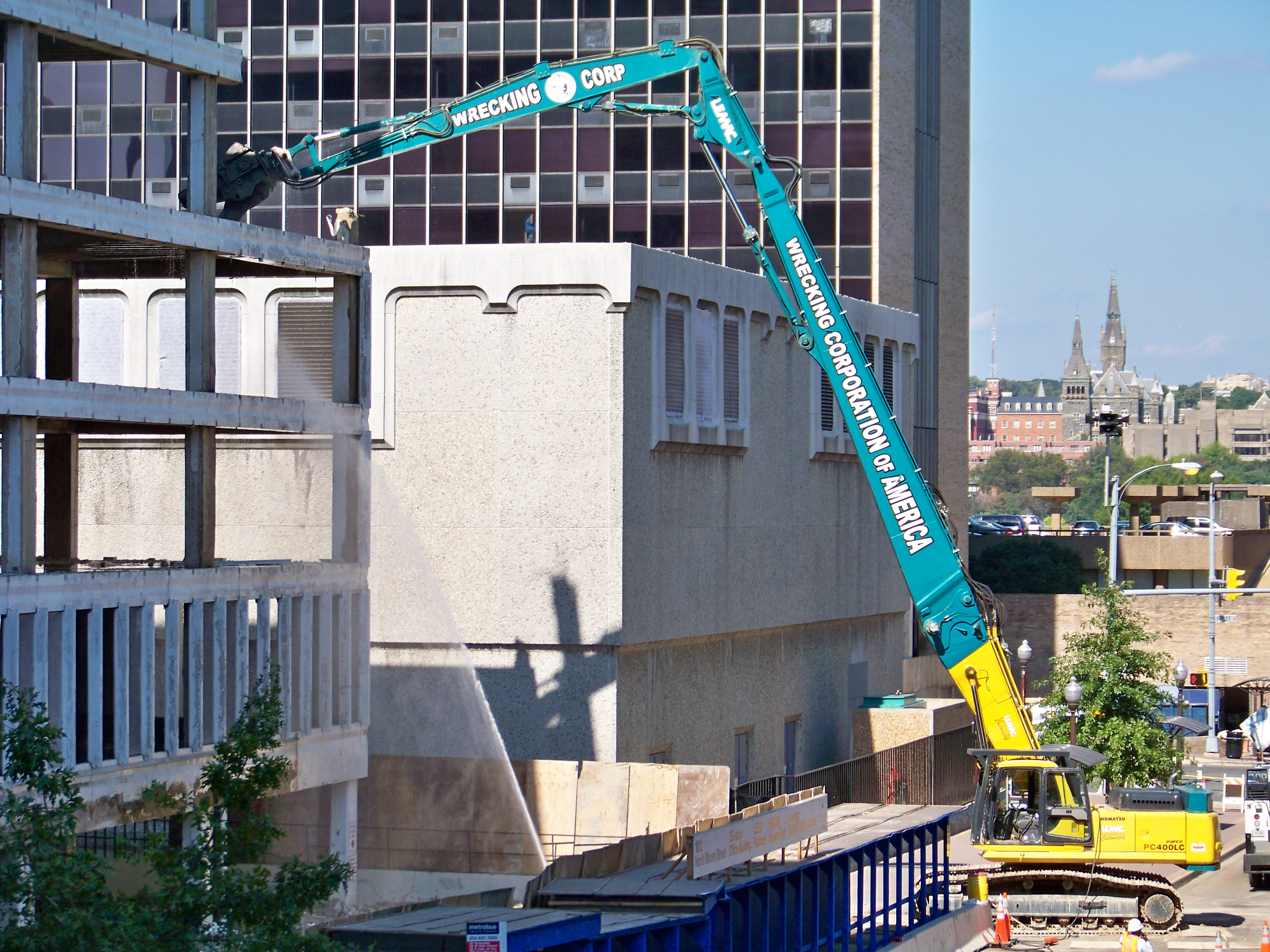
A long reach excavator being used to demolish an office building in Rosslyn, Virginia

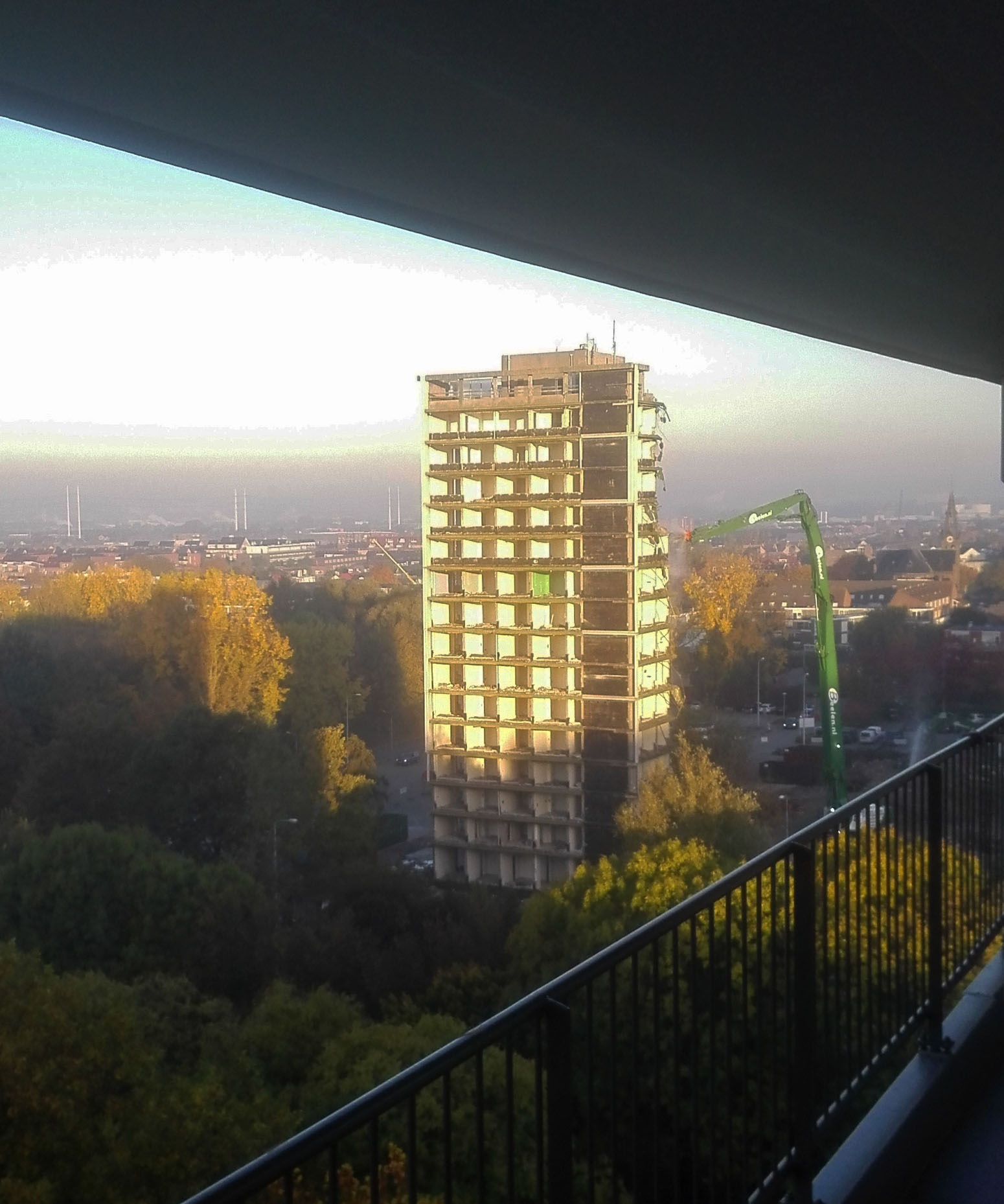
UHD demolishing a high-rise building

A long reach excavator is a type of excavator where the arm has been extended to reach further than a normal excavator would. It is often used in demolition of buildings, but it can also be used in other applications.

== History ==
The term long reach excavator was probably first coined by Richard Melhuish, the Chairman of Land & Water. During the 1970s, Land & Water operated the UK's first hire fleet of these new and innovative long reach hydraulic excavators. In fact they still operate the largest fleet of long-reaches in the UK. Land & Water's first long reach excavator was the Hymac 580 BT All Hydraulic 360 “Waterway” machine, designed for work on waterways. These early machines from Hymac came to be widely preferred to the more traditional drag lines designs.

Around the same time Priestman (and later Ruston Bucyrus) VC (Variable Counterweight) excavators started to become more popular. However, the work VC machines could achieve was slightly constrained by design limitations compared to fully hydraulic "long reach" machines, especially with the arrival of more reliable machines from Japan built by manufacturers such as Hitachi and Komatsu. These Japanese designed machines hardly ever leaked hydraulic fluid.

== Applications ==
Long reach machines are not suitable for the high side twisting forces that can be exerted by demolition attachments and many demolition machines are unstable at large radius. They are often assisted with electronic cut off devices that restrict the operating radius of the machine. Long reach machines are particularly useful in dredging operations.

== Related machines ==
The high reach excavator is a development of the excavator with an especially long boom arm, that is primarily used for demolition. Instead of excavating ditches, the high reach excavator is designed to reach the upper stories of buildings that are being demolished and pull down the structure in a controlled fashion. It has largely replaced the wrecking ball as the primary tool for demolition.

Ultra high reach demolition excavators (UHD) are demolition excavators with several tens of meters of reach. Reaches of up to 48 metres (157 ft) are in operation as of 2016. As of 2017, there are UHD machines that can reach 67 metres (220 ft).

== Trivia ==
The long reach excavator imported to New Zealand for demolitions of tall buildings following the 2010 and 2011 earthquakes has been nicknamed Twinkle Toes. It is the largest excavator in the Southern Hemisphere.

== See also ==
- Caterpillar 345C L
- Amphibious excavator
