= Pyroban =

UK-based explosion protection safety company

- Company type: Private
- Founder: Phil Tyrer
- Headquarters: Shoreham-by-Sea, West Sussex, United Kingdom
- Number of locations: United Kingdom
- Services: Explosion protection safety
- Website: www.pyroban.com

Pyroban began as a project implemented by Imperial Chemical Industries (ICI) after the accidental release and ignition of a flammable vapour by a diesel engine at its Wilton Plant in the UK in 1969.

In 1972 Power Research Ltd was formed by Phil Tyrer, to offer a sub-contract prototype design and development service to prevent industrial equipment creating an explosion in a flammable atmosphere. Power Research carried out development work for the Pyroban project and in 1974 changed its name to Pyroban Ltd offering explosion proof solutions to industries such as oil and gas, mining and manufacturing.

In 1980 the company pioneered gas detection used on battery electric vehicles such as forklift trucks so that they could be used in areas where flammable gas or vapour is present. This method is still being used today.

By the turn of the century, many industrial accidents, the result of the ignition of flammable material, had shaped health and safety policy across the developed world. In Europe, this was consolidated with the introduction of the ATEX Directive in 2003.

These policies have improved the safety of people working in hazardous areas and drove an increasing need for explosion protected equipment leading to new innovations from Pyroban as it aligned with the latest technologies.

Around 2003, Pyroban pioneered the introduction of gas detection in diesel engines to certifiably eliminate the use of a flame arrestor in the diesel engine exhaust stream. This was significant as it meant that operators could keep engines running on an offshore platform without having to clean the flame arrestor every 8 hours. It also prevented operational issues from occurring where dummy flame arrestors (blanks) could otherwise be used, exposing oil and gas rigs to potential explosions.

The Deepwater Horizon disaster in 2010 had a significant impact on the global oil and gas industry and helped shape policy further.

On 31 August 2011, Pyroban was acquired by Caterpillar Inc. On 17 November 2017, Caterpillar Inc. divested its 100% interest in the Pyroban Group and it is now owned by the Longacre Group.

In 2020, Pyroban was able to expand on its 2003 innovation and replace the plate type flame arrestors found in explosion protected diesel engines with a passive system that doesn't use gas detection.

Pyroban is a founding member of the Pioneer Safety Group of companies which provides safety solutions for businesses operating in hazardous or harsh environments all over the world.

Today, the company is instrumental in supporting businesses that need to operate with potentially explosive atmospheres while introducing electrification and automation into their operations, and supports emerging technologies such as hydrogen storage for hydrogen vehicles.
