= Dealer Business System =

Dealer Business System (DBS) is a supply-chain management / dealership management system application developed with Accenture on AS/400 minicomputers in the 1990s. Caterpillar dealers have been using this application to manage their internal problems as well as external connections to CAT. The main modules include:

- Order processing
- Parts inventory
- Service
- Rental
- Equipment management system

== Versions ==
=== Accentures role ===
In June 2002, Caterpillar and Accenture announced a 10-year agreement to build and provide support for DBS

In May 2009, dealers approved the transition of DBS support to the Accenture Dealer Management Services group.

=== High 5 software's role ===
In May 2012, High 5 Software announces support to replace the DBSi system after feedback that many of the other software vendor systems are faltering.

== Ending of CAT support ==
In April 2008, Caterpillar announced a change in vision.

In developing the new DBSi system strategy, multiple areas were considered such as:

- A thorough review of dealer needs five to seven years into the future
- An assessment of the long-term financial viability of continuing DBSi development for 80–100 dealers
- A review of 3rd party dealer management systems offered in the marketplace
- Recent dealer evaluations and decisions to leave DBS/DBSi

With this accomplished, consensus from all parties involved resulted in the completion of a new DBSi system strategy. Together, it was concluded that systems from outside providers such as Microsoft, Infor and SAP could meet Caterpillar dealers needs and that continued investments in DBSi to compete with these systems is no longer a viable option for either Caterpillar or the dealers. Since this time Accenture has taken over development of DBS / DBSi.

This application runs on AS/400 minicomputers locally in dealers' data centers, and connect to CAT systems to place orders.
