= Cat CT660 =

Heavy on-road truck

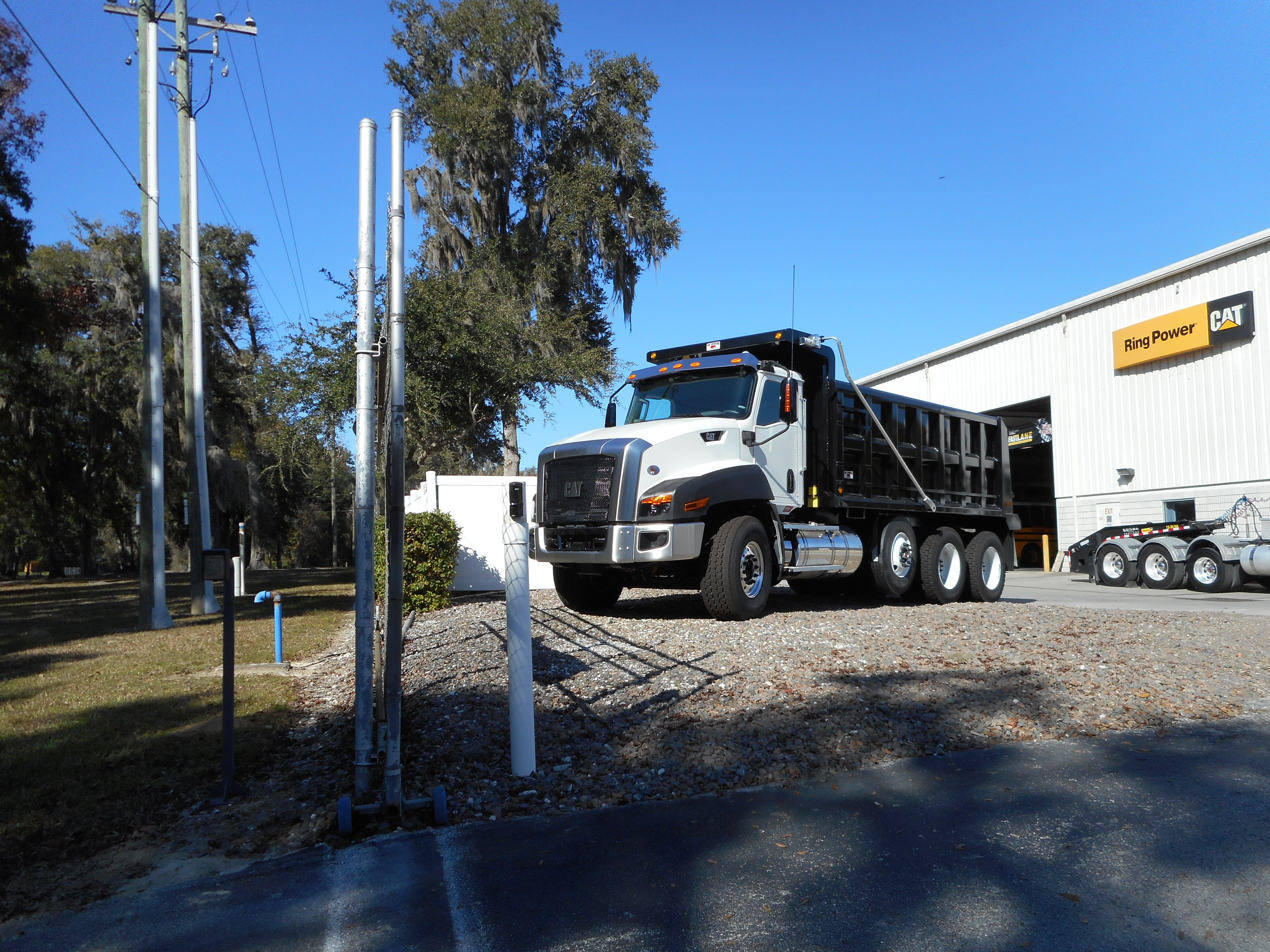
A CT660 at a Caterpillar dealership on US 98 in Hernando County, Florida.

The Cat CT660 is a Class 8 vocational truck sold by Caterpillar Inc. which represents a diversification of the company's product line into the on-highway trucking industry. Available at Cat dealers from summer 2011, the truck was equipped with either a CAT 11 liter CT11 or 13 liter CT13 engine and is built at Navistar International’s factory in Garland, Texas.

CT660s are sold and serviced by Cat dealers only.

As of March 2016, Caterpillar has ceased production of on-highway vocational trucks stating that “Remaining a viable competitor in this market would require significant additional investment to develop and launch a complete portfolio of trucks, and upon an updated review, we determined there was not a sufficient market opportunity to justify the investment,” said Ramin Younessi, vice president with responsibility for Caterpillar's Industrial Power Systems Division. “We have not yet started truck production in Victoria, and this decision allows us to exit this business before the transition occurs.”

== Specifications ==
=== Chassis ===
- Set-Back Axle (SBA), 116-inch and 122-inch Bumper to Back of Cab (BBC) available
- Durable, heat-treated alloy steel frame rails
- 12.0-inch rail size: 110,000 and 120,000 psi yield strength
- Length variable in 2.0-inch increments
- Available with rail reinforcements: one or two frame reinforcements available

=== Axles ===
Meritor, Dana and Fabco options available

=== Suspension ===
Front:

- Multileaf, shackle type, single or two-stage spring
- Multileaf, slipper type
- Compatible shock absorber selection

Rear:

- Hendrickson suspension offerings: HaulMaax, HN, RT/RTE, RS, R, PriMaax
- Chalmers high articulation

=== Fuel tanks ===
Fuel tanks available in 60, 80, 100 and 120 gallon capacities
Single left, single right or dual options available
Aluminum alloy construction

== Sources ==
- "Cat CT660 Specifications". (309) 675-1000. Caterpillar Inc. Archived from the original on 21 April 2011.
