= Wings of Hope (charity) =

American nonprofit organization

- Founded: 1963
- Type: Nonprofit organization
- Purpose: Medical air transportation
- Headquarters: St. Louis, Missouri
- Region served: U.S., Americas, Asia, Africa
- Website: wingsofhope.ngo

Wings of Hope is a nonprofit organization that partners with organizations in ten countries outside of the U.S. to provide medical evacuation flights and access to health care for remote communities. Wings of Hope also provides free medical air transportation to people within a 900-mile radius of its St. Louis headquarters. Wings of Hope has been twice nominated for the Nobel Peace Prize and holds a 4-star (the highest) rating on Charity Navigator. In 2019, Wings of Hope directly served nearly 73,000 people worldwide.

== History ==
Wings of Hope was founded by four businessmen from St. Louis, Missouri: William Edwards, Joseph Fabick (Fabick Tractor Company), Paul Rodgers (V.P., Ozark Air Lines), and George Haddaway. The four had heard of a young woman, Sister Michael Therese Ryan, who was the pilot of a small, fabric-covered Piper PA-18 Super Cub in the Turkana region of Kenya. The story of Sister Ryan using aircraft to bring relief to impoverished famine victims in a vast, remote region of Kenya inspired the men to raise money for a stronger, all-metal aircraft to better aid the effort.

After the founders raised the necessary capital for a new Cessna U206, Max Conrad piloted the plane across the Atlantic from St. Louis to Nairobi. The story was widely publicized and received a positive response from the international community, including people who needed aircraft and those who wanted to help by offering their time, money, and services.

From this initial effort by four men who were on a mission to help those in need, Wings of Hope has grown into a global aviation nonprofit operating in 48 countries since its founding in 1963.

== Programs ==
Wings of Hope partners with local organizations in ten countries outside of the U.S., using aviation to help them deliver health care resources to isolated communities. As of 2021, Wings of Hope operated in Belize, Cambodia, Colombia, Ecuador, Haiti, Nicaragua, Papua New Guinea, Paraguay, Tanzania, and Zambia.

=== Medical Relief and Air Transport Program ===
Through its Medical Relief and Air Transport Program, Wings of Hope provides free medical flights within a 900-mile radius of its St. Louis-area headquarters. In a typical year, the organization flies more than 200 patients and their caregivers to medical care.

=== Soar into STEM ===
Wings of Hope's Soar into STEM program provides middle and high school students with project-based learning connections to STEM curriculum, as well as education on Wings of Hope's activities.

== Honorary Council ==
- John Danforth, former United States senator
- Elizabeth Dole, former United States senator
- Carl Edwards, professional stock car driver
- Harrison Ford, actor and pilot
- Barrington Irving, pilot and STEM educator
- Sherrill Kazan, President of the World Council of Peoples for the United Nations
- Colin Powell, former Chairman of the Joint Chiefs of Staff and former Secretary of State
- Justin Francis Rigali, Archbishop Emeritus of Philadelphia
- Kurt Russell, actor and pilot
- Thomas P. Stafford, former astronaut
- Patty Wagstaff, aerobatic pilot

== Awards and accolades ==
- Lindbergh Award presented by the St. Louis section of the American Institute of Aeronautics & Astronautics (1993)
- Adela Riek Scharr Medallion (1993)
- Distinguished Achievement Award presented by The Wings Club (1995)
- George Washington Honor Medal presented by the Freedoms Foundation at Valley Forge (1997)
- Spirit of Chesterfield Award presented by the Chesterfield Chamber of Commerce (2004)
- National Aeronautic Association National Public Benefit Flying Award (2004, 2006, 2007, 2011, 2012)
- World Trade Center Saint Louis Global Ambassador Award (2005)
- Health Care Heroes Award in Nursing category presented by the St. Louis Business Journal (2006)
- Community Service Award presented by the William T. Kemper Foundation (2006)
- CFO of the Year Award for the Small Nonprofit category presented by St. Louis Business Journal (2011)
- What's Right with the Region presented by Focus St. Louis (2011)
- Award of Achievement for Humanitarian Efforts presented by the Ninety-Nines, International Organization of Women Pilots (2012)
- GuideStar Gold Participant
- Nobel Peace Prize Nominee (2011 & 2012)
- Ladue News Charity Awards Finalist (2015)
- 3-star rating on Charity Navigator
- United Nations Humanitarian Award
