= George Schaefer (businessman) =

American businessman and CEO

George Schaefer (1928 – 2013) was an American businessman who was CEO of Caterpillar Inc., a US-based construction equipment company.

Schaefer graduated from Saint Louis University in 1951 to begin his career at Caterpillar, where he spent the next 39 years. Schaefer rose to the position of chairman and CEO of the company in 1985 up until 1990 when he retired.

George Schaefer took over Caterpillar during troubled times: as the company's losses mounted to nearly US$1 billion, strikes were prevalent at most of its plants across America, and foreign competition was becoming very strong. In 1985, he began the transformation of Caterpillar through a number of cost-cutting efforts, most notably outsourcing production offshore. Schaefer moved away from a centralized business model by implementing a number different programs that he had previously designed: venture capital, financial services, and product development. This structure that Schaefer created still remains in place today for the company. Schaefer was also responsible for changing the company name from Caterpillar Tractor Co. to Caterpillar Inc. The transformation that Schaefer led while chairman drove Caterpillar from losses and uncertain times to achieving exponential profits and global growth.

Schaefer was appointed to Ronald Reagan's advisory committee for Trade Negotiations in April 1987.
