= Caterpillar 345C L =

Large hydraulic excavator manufactured by Caterpillar

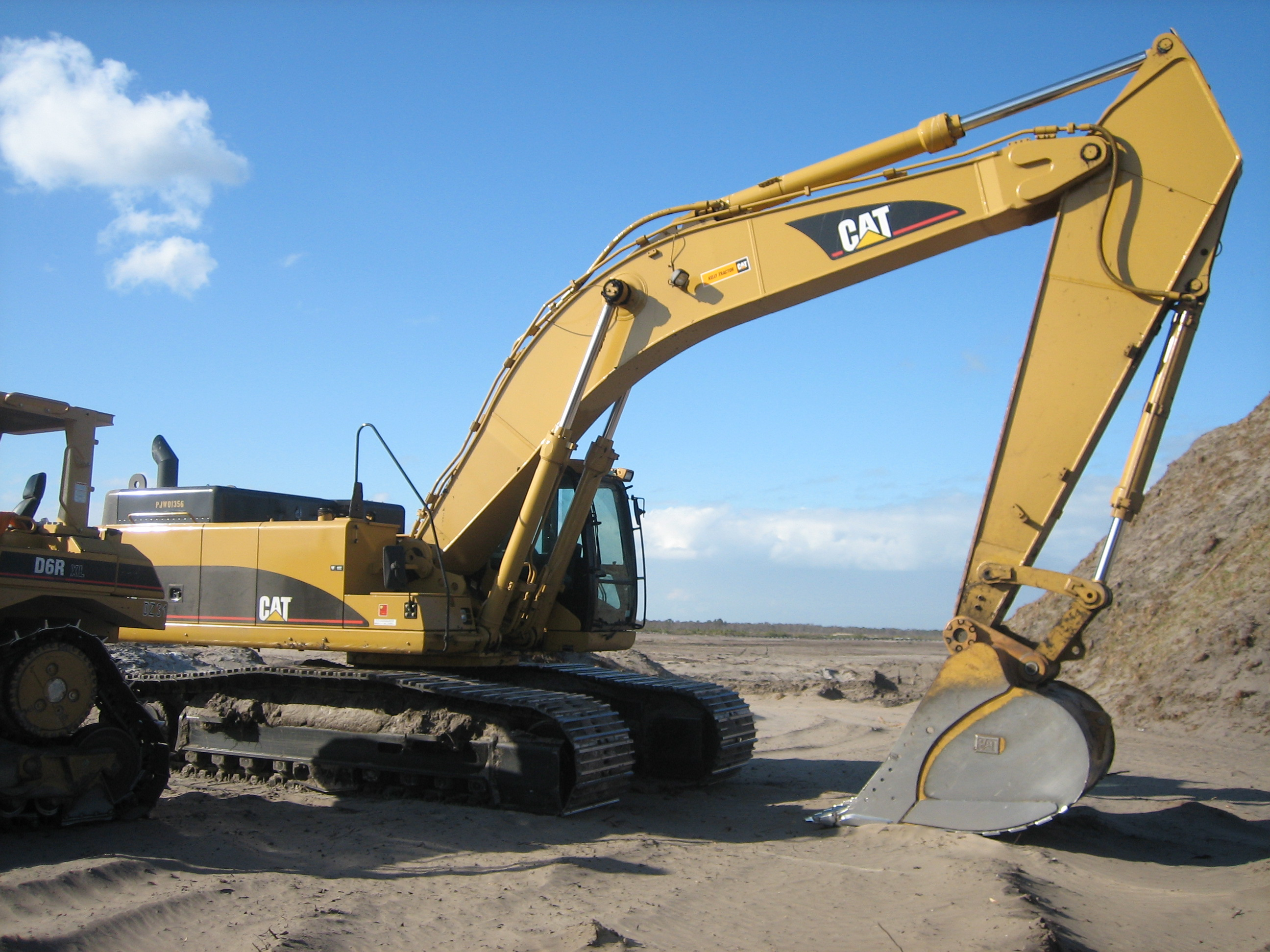
A Caterpillar 345C L Excavator parked on a residential construction site in South Florida.

The Caterpillar 345C L is a large hydraulic excavator manufactured by Caterpillar Inc. The 345C L, with 345 hp (257 kW) of net flywheel power, is classified as a large excavator by Caterpillar. In Caterpillar's naming conventions, the last two digits indicate the excavator's weight in metric tonnes. The 345C L is not named after its horsepower. Rather, it is a coincidence that both use the number 345. Caterpillar currently produces the 300 series, including the 345C L.

== Specifications ==
=== Engine ===
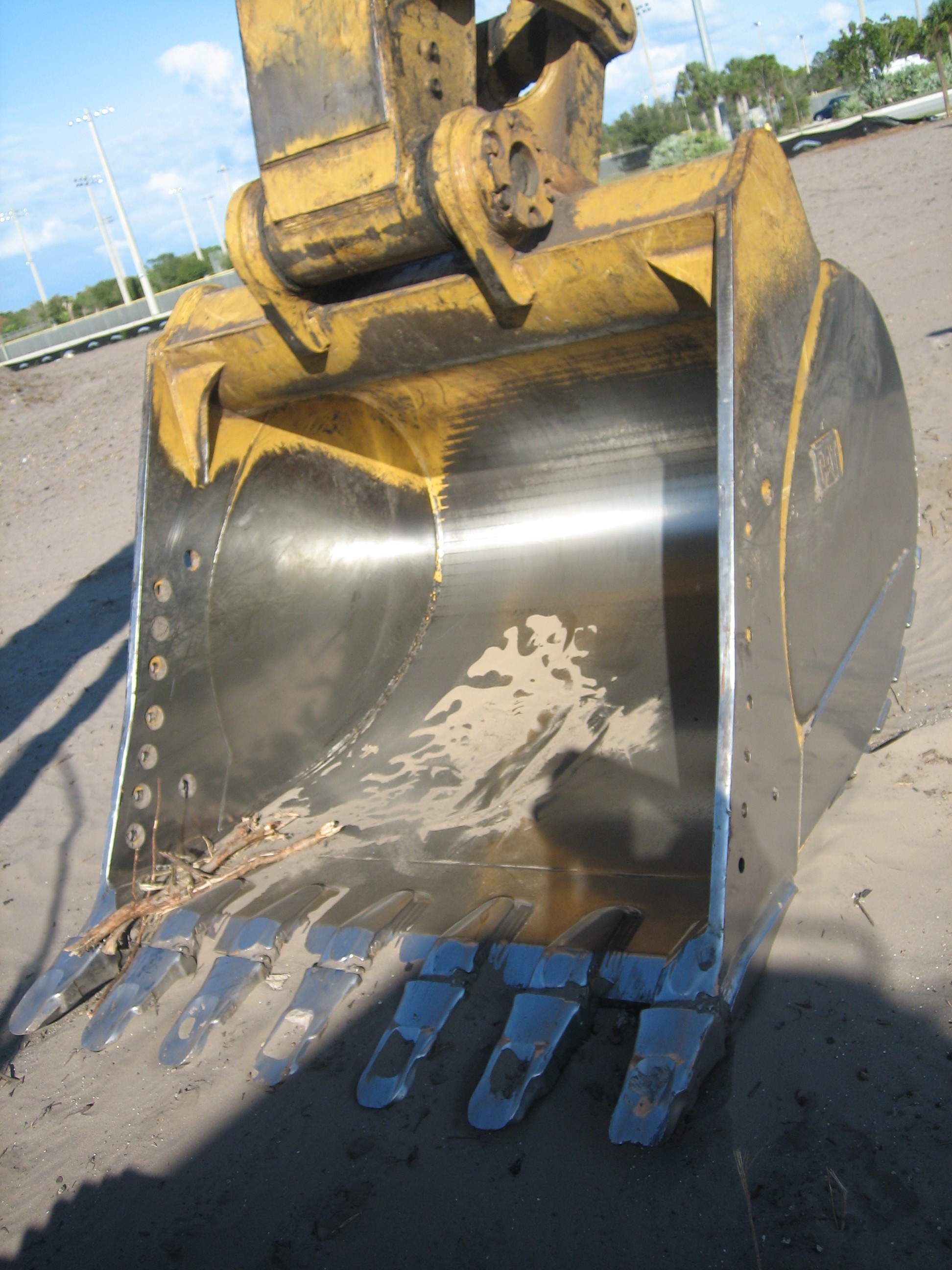
A Caterpillar 345C L Excavator bucket.

- Engine Model: Caterpillar C13 ACERT
- Net Flywheel Power: 345 hp (257 kW)
- Net Power (ISO 9249): 345 hp (257 kW)
- Net Power (SAE J1349): 349 hp (257 kW)
- Net Power (EEC 80/1269): 345 hp (257 kW)
- Cylinders: 6

=== Weights ===
- Operating Weight: 99,150 lb (44,970 kg)
- Operating Weight (long undercarriage): 99,150 lb (44,970 kg)

=== Operating specifications ===
- Max Reach at Ground Level: 42.5 ft (13.0 m)
- Max Digging Depth: 29.3 ft (8.9 m)
- Max Bucket Capacity: 5 yd³ (3.8 m³)
- Nominal bucket weight: 3,880 lb (1,760 kg)
- Bucket digging force (Normal): 39,300 lbf (175 kN) (

== In the media ==
- "Episode 678: Auction Fever", Planet Money, January 22, 2016.
