= Fabick Caterpillar =

Equipment dealer in Fenton, Missouri, US

Fabick Caterpillar is a Caterpillar dealership headquartered in Fenton, Missouri, United States. It was founded in 1917 by John Fabick, Sr. While an independently owned dealership for most of its history, it was acquired by Caterpillar in November 2026. An ownership dispute between former CEO Doug Fabick and other Fabick family members arose after he was removed from the company but did not give up his controlling interest; Caterpillar agreed to purchase the dealership to ensure continued operations.

In 1927, Caterpillar named the company its exclusive dealer in the St. Louis region. Fabick operates eighteen dealerships in Missouri, Illinois, Michigan and Wisconsin, in addition to selling their products at numerous other non-dealership locations. It has more than 1,200 employees and $500,000,000 in inventory. The company founded the Fabick Nature Preserve on the former site of the Fabick family mansion.

In 2015, John Fabick Tractor merged with Fabco, which is owned by members of the Fabick family. In February 2017 Vice President Mike Pence visited to commemorate 100 years of Fabick.
