= Mitsubishi Caterpillar Forklifts =

Joint venture between Mitsubishi Heavy Industries and Caterpillar Inc.

Mitsubishi Logisnext Co., Inc. is a group of multinational companies that were formed under a joint venture between Mitsubishi Heavy Industries (MHI) and Caterpillar Inc. in order to manufacture and market trucks. The group manufactures and distributes Cat Lift Trucks, Mitsubishi Forklift Trucks, Rocla, TCM, and Jungheinrich warehouse products to the material handling industry.

== History ==
The joint venture was formed on July 1, 1992 when MHI entered a joint venture with Caterpillar Inc.

The joint venture includes the following companies based on the geographic markets they serve:

- Americas: Mitsubishi Logisnext Americas based in Houston, Texas, USA.
- Europe & Africa: Mitsubishi Logisnext Europe based in Almere, Netherlands.
- Far East: Mitsubishi Logisnext Asia Pacific based in Singapore.

The joint venture combined a variety of operational strengths to form a successful company. Mitsubishi's operational strengths include cost-effective manufacturing expertise, vast engineering resources and possession proprietary powertrain. Caterpillar Inc. provided marketing experience, worldwide dealer organization, brand recognition and effective product support.

== Mitsubishi Logisnext Americas ==
Mitsubishi Logisnext Americas Inc.
- Type: Private
- Industry: Manufacturing & Distribution
- Founded: 1992
- Headquarters: Houston, Texas, United States
- Products: Machinery
- Website: www.logisnextamericas.com/en/mit

Mitsubishi Logisnext Americas Inc. ("MLA"), headquartered in Houston, Texas is a manufacturer and distributor of material handling equipment and parts under the Mitsubishi Forklift Trucks, Cat Lift Trucks, and Jungheinrich brand names. MLA also owns the rights to Towmotor brand name, and manufactures under it. MLA is ISO 9001-2000 certified and has obtained compliance certification from the California Air Resources Board (CARB). MLA provides a full line of forklifts with complete sales and product support through more than 400 dealer locations throughout the United States, Canada and Latin America.

The company's 860,000 sq ft (80,000 m^{2}). facility in Houston is located on 42 acres (170,000 m^{2}) of land and employs 1,200 workers, capable of producing over 25,000 forklifts per annum.

MLA is a subsidiary of Mitsubishi Heavy Industries and one of the worldwide Mitsubishi Logisnext group of companies:

- MLE (Mitsubishi Logisnext Europe) based in Almere, Netherlands.
- MLAP (Mitsubishi Logisnext Asia Pacific) based in Singapore.

Each group, with the exception of MLAP, is responsible for design engineering, manufacturing and marketing the product lines and handling parts distribution in their respective regions.

=== History ===
MLA was formed through a joint venture in 1992 between two major companies, Mitsubishi Heavy Industries, Ltd. (MHI) and Caterpillar Industrial Inc. (CII). Jungheinrich Forklifts joined this partnership on January 1, 2010 through a manufacturing and distribution agreement with MCFA.

=== Products ===
- Internal Combustion Cushion Tire Lift Trucks
- Internal Combustion Pneumatic Tire Lift Trucks
- Electric Counterbalanced Forklifts
- Electric Narrow Aisle Forklift Trucks
- Electric and Manual Walkie Forklifts

== Mitsubishi Logisnext Europe ==
Mitsubishi Caterpillar Forklift Europe B.V.
- Type: Private
- Industry: Manufacturing & Distribution
- Founded: 1992
- Headquarters: Almere, Netherlands
- Products: Machinery
- Website: www.mcfe.com

Mitsubishi Logisnext Europe B.V. (MLE) is a manufacturer and distributor of materials handling products under the brand names Mitsubishi Forklift Trucks, TCM, Rocla, and Cat Lift Trucks.

Serving customers in Europe (including Russia and the Commonwealth of Independent States – CIS), North Africa and the Middle East, it is a subsidiary of Mitsubishi Heavy Industries Ltd (MHI) and Caterpillar Inc. whose other materials handling subsidiaries include:

- Mitsubishi Logisnext Asia Pacific Pte Ltd
- Mitsubishi Logisnext Americas Inc.
- Mitsubishi Logisnext Forklift (Shanghai) Co. Ltd

MLE is based in Almere, the Netherlands, from which it supports a network of more than a hundred independently owned and operated dealers and distributors covering more than 72 countries. MCFE has received the following quality accreditations from the International Organization for Standardization: ISO 9001, ISO 9002, ISO 14001.

=== History ===
MLE was formed in 1992 when MHI entered a joint venture with Caterpillar Inc.

=== Production and support facilities ===
MLE’s headquarters are located at the ‘De Vaart’ industrial park in Almere, the Netherlands. They also own a separate manufacturing facility in Järvenpää, Finland, and can call on the resources of the Mitsubishi Logisnext centres in Asia and America for further manufacturing capacity.

In addition, MLE has a central European parts centre based in Puurs, Belgium. The European parts operation is supplemented and supported by those in Asia and America.

In 2012 production in Almere stopped due to recession and lack of sales. MLE changed from a production facility to a sales office.
