= Nishat Jubaida =

Bangladeshi army officer and microbiologist

- নিশাত জুবাইদা
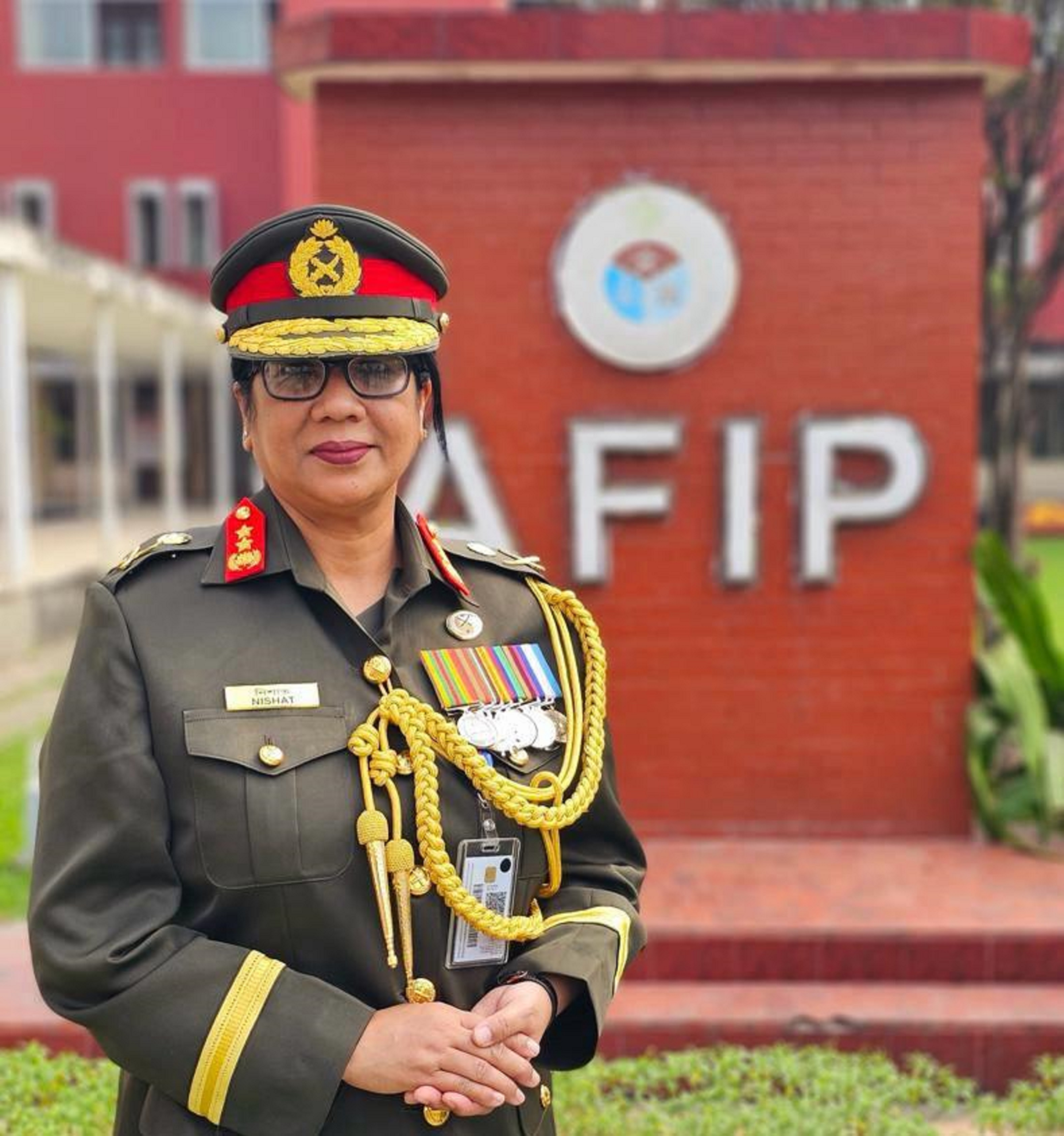
- Jubaida in 2024
- Alma mater: Sylhet MAG Osmani Medical College
- Military career
- Allegiance: Bangladesh
- Branch: Bangladesh Army
- Service years: 1992–present
- Rank: Major General
- Unit: Bangladesh Army Medical Corps
- Commands: Commandant of Armed Forces Institute of Pathology; Head(Micro-Bio) of Army Medical College, Chittagong; Head(Pathology) of Army Medical College Rangpur

Nishat Jubaida FCPS, DCP is a major general and is currently the highest-ranking female officer of the Bangladesh Army. Currently serving as commandant of the Armed Forces Institute of Pathology. She was promoted to the rank of major general on 16 February 2023 as the second female major general in the Bangladesh Army after Major General Susane Giti.

== Career ==
Jubaida is an expert on medical microbiology, transplant immunology, and immunogenetics. Before being promoted to the current rank, Brigadier General Jubaida was the head of the microbiology department of the Army Medical College Chittagong.

She is the incumbent commandant of the Armed Forces Institute of Pathology (AFIP).

== See also ==
- Women in the Bangladesh Army
