= Women in the Bangladesh military =

Women have been members of the Bangladeshi military since the early part of the 2000s as officers. On 30 May 2016, the Bangladesh Navy got female sailors for the first time in its history. Women had also been recruited as airwomen for the first time in the Bangladesh Air Force in 2020. In the Border Guard Bangladesh, women have been recruited as sepoys since 2016.

== Army ==
=== The liberation war of Bangladesh ===
All women participated in the Bangladesh liberation war in 1971 were civilians but there was one army personnel and she was Sitara Begum, she was commissioned into the Pakistan Army Medical Corps as a lieutenant in 1970. Sitara deserted the Pakistan Army in 1971 and took part in the Bangladesh liberation war as the commanding officer of the Bangladesh Field Hospital, and was awarded the Bir Protik medal for her contribution.

=== First batch of female officers ===
In the Bangladesh Army women were first taken as officer cadets in 2000; Bangladesh Military Academy's 47th long course was the first batch where women were inducted.

=== Noted female officers ===
Zannatul Ferdous became the army's first female paratrooper on 7 February 2013, she was commissioned on 24 December 2009 from the Bangladesh Military Academy's 59th long course.

In 2015, the army got its first female pilots: Nazia Nusrat Hossain and Shahrina Binte Anwar. Hossain was commissioned in the corps of engineers and Anwar in the ordnance corps. Both women were commissioned in December 2009, and completed their first solo flying training successfully in June 2015.

Nazma Begum of the Bangladesh Army Medical Corps was the first female contingent commander in United Nations peacekeeping. Nazma went to UNOCI in 2016 with a 56-member contingent, and as a lieutenant colonel was the first female commanding officer of a field ambulance of the Bangladesh Army. Susane Giti of the medical corps was the first woman in the Bangladesh Army to be promoted to major general, in 2018. Nishat Jubaida was the second female major general of the army.

In 2019, four female officers were promoted to lieutenant colonels and were appointed commanding officers of combat units which was first time in Bangladesh Army's history; the women were Sanjida Hossain, Syeda Nazia Raihan and Farhana Afreen of the regiment of artillery and Sarah Amir of the corps of engineers.

In 2022, a wheelchair-using female officer named Kaniz Fatema was promoted to major.

=== First batch of female soldiers ===
The first batch of female ordinary soldiers of the Bangladesh Army completed their recruit training on 29 January 2015 in Ghatail Cantonment, which is situated in Tangail District. A total number of 879 women were enlisted from that batch into the Bangladesh Army Medical Corps.

=== Permission of wearing hijab ===
Since September 2024, women in the Bangladesh army have been allowed to wear the hijab head covering to express their Muslim faith.

== Navy ==
On 12 January 2000, 16 women joined the Bangladesh Naval Academy for officer cadet training, this was the first batch of female officers of the Bangladesh Navy.

The navy enlisted female sailors for the first time in its history on 30 May 2016. 44 women were enlisted as sailors on that day at BNS Titumir naval base in Khulna District, alongside 727 male sailors who completed their basic naval training on the same day.

== Air Force ==
=== Officers ===
In 2000, women were inducted as officer cadets in the Bangladesh Air Force. In 2014, the air force started taking women in the pilots' branch.

=== Airwomen ===
On 25 November 2020, at the Bangladesh Air Force's Recruits Training School (RTS) in Shamshernagar, the passing out parade of the 48th Airmen Entry was held, a total of 752 recruits passed out, including 64 women. This was the first time in the history of the Bangladesh Air Force that women were recruited as airwomen.

== Border Guard Bangladesh ==
In the Border Guard Bangladesh (BGB), 97 women completed basic training at Border Guard Training Center and School, Satkania Upazila, Chattogram on 5 June 2016 (Sunday), this was the 88th BGB batch and women were taken for the first time in this batch in the history of BGB.

== Gallery ==
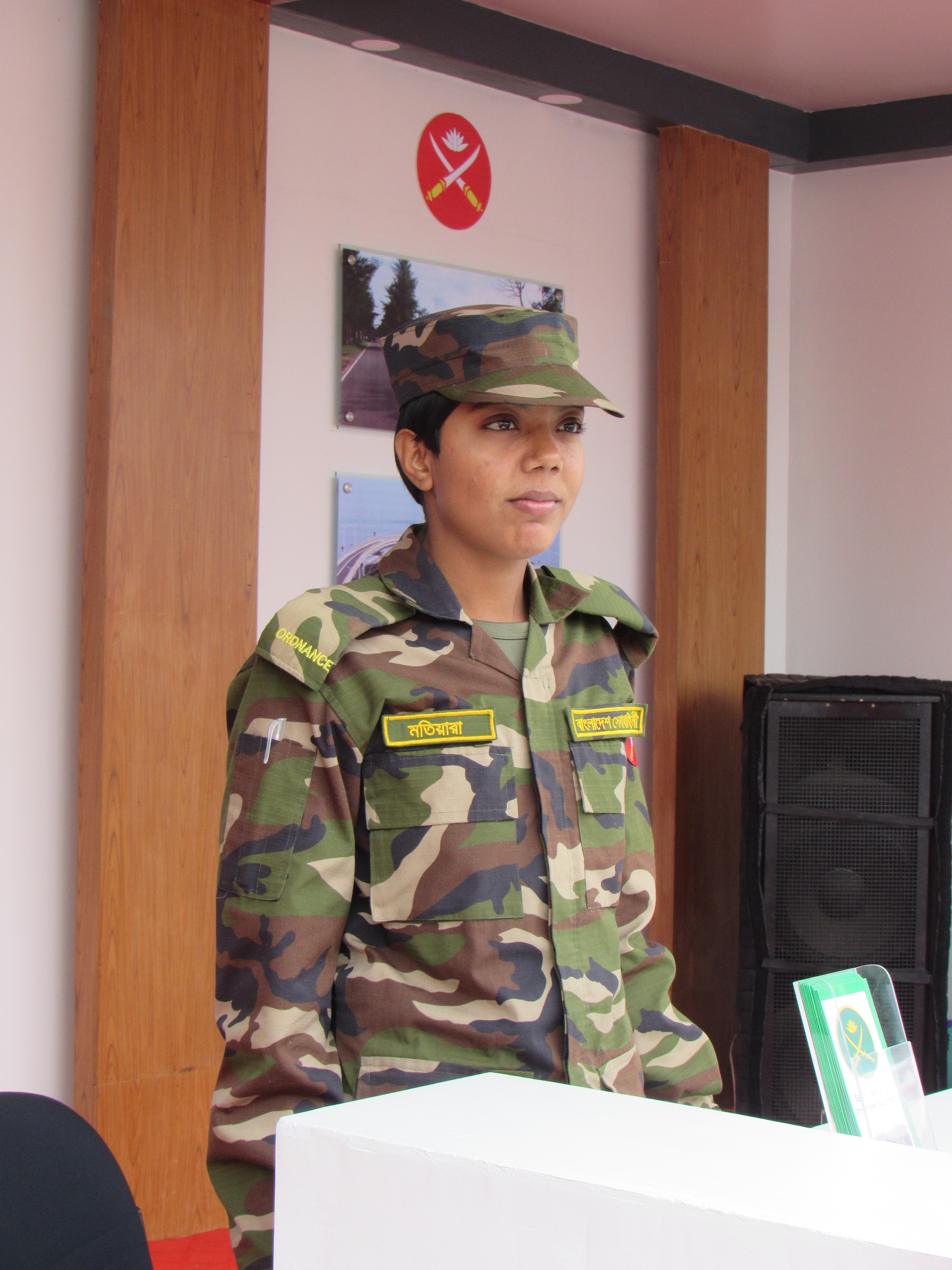
A female soldier of the Bangladesh Army in 2018

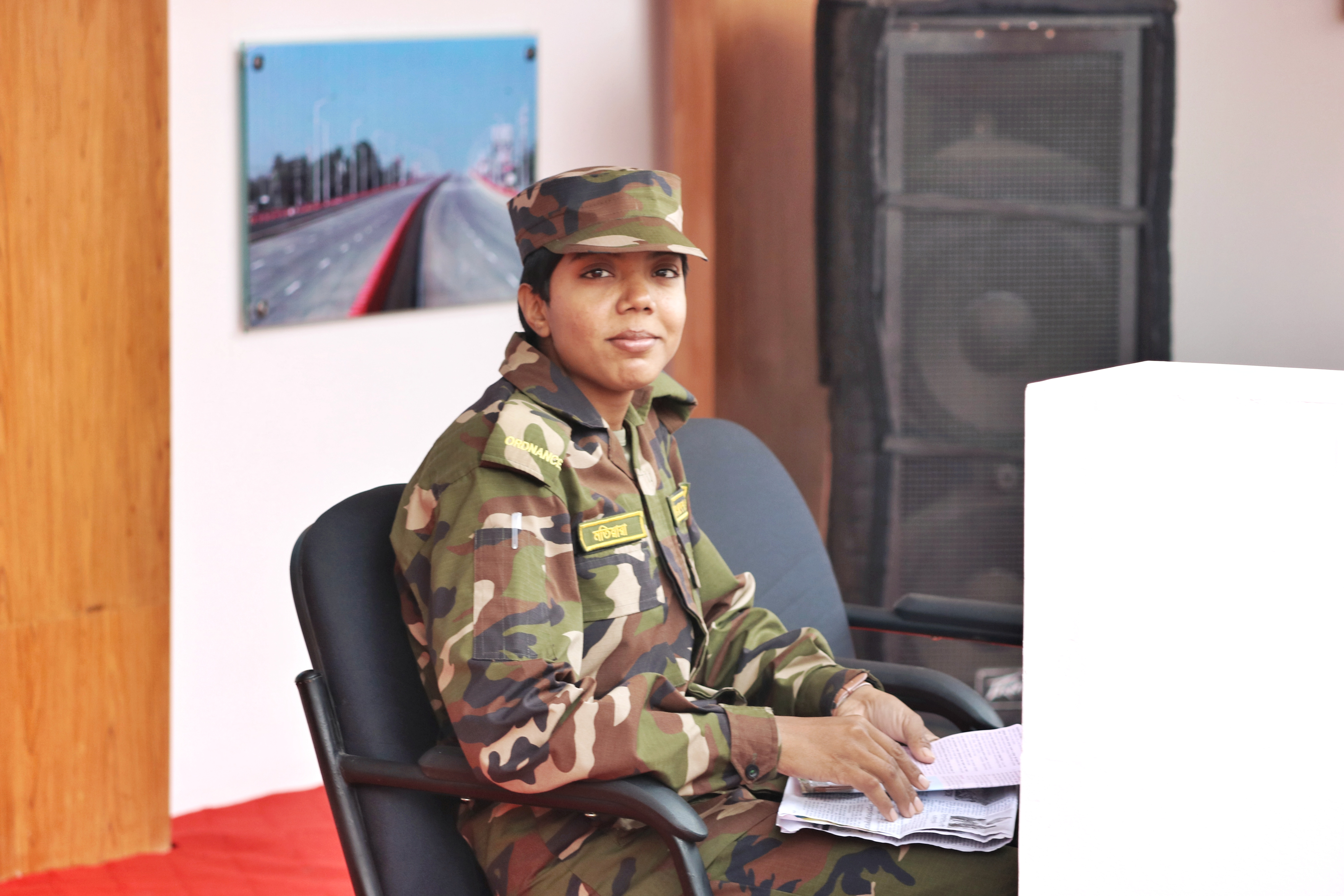
Woman soldier of the Bangladesh Army in 2018

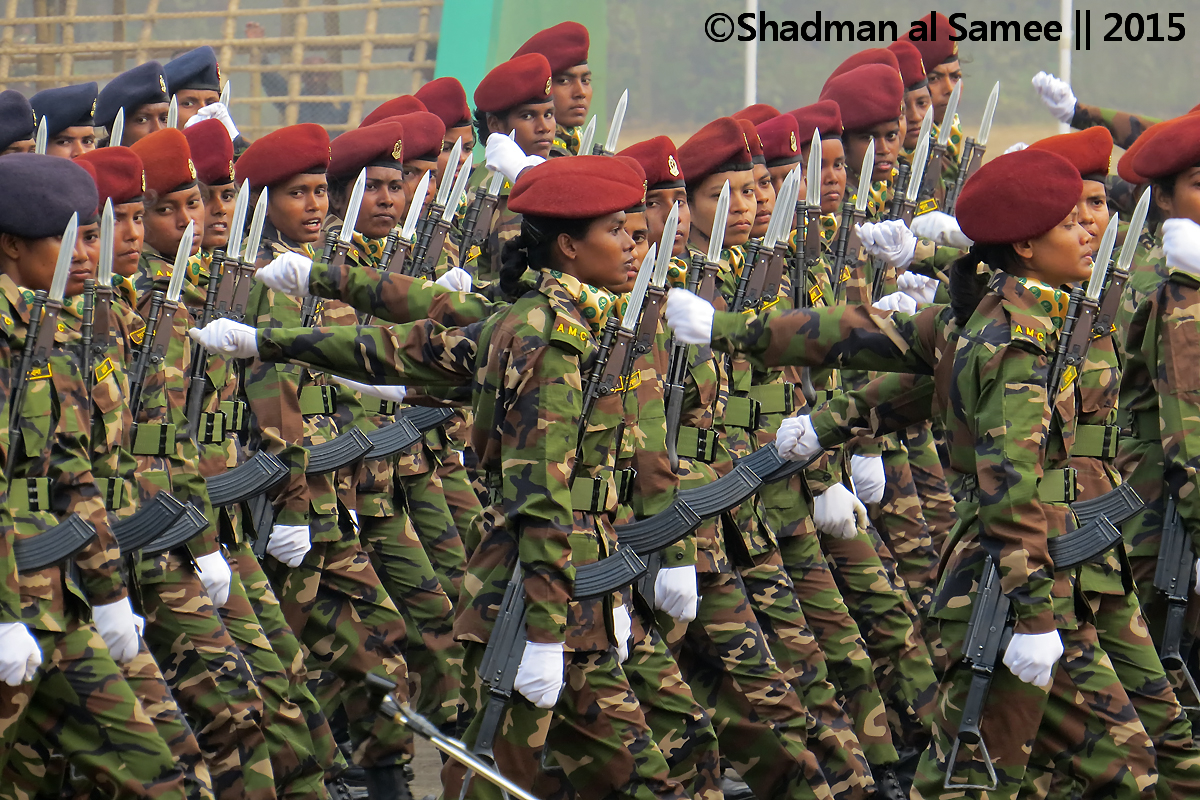
Bangladesh Army female soldiers in parade in 2015

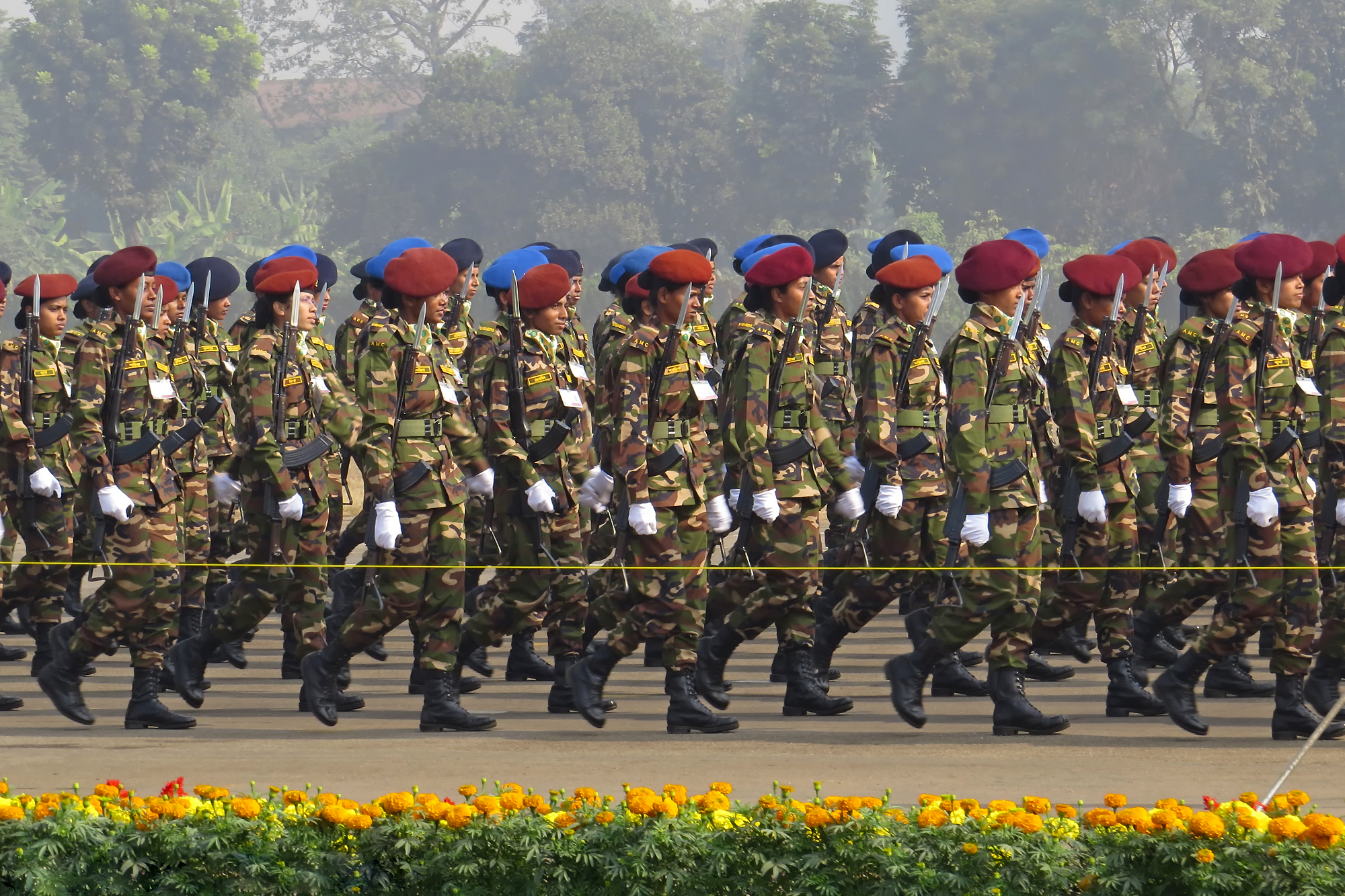
Bangladesh Army female soldiers in parade in 2016

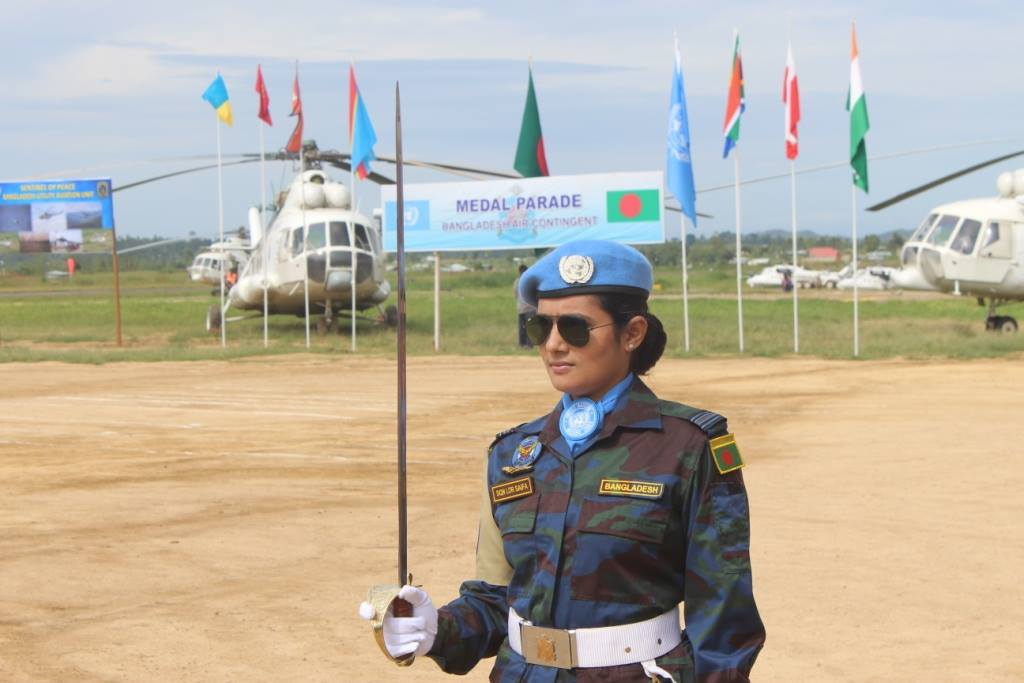
A female air force officer in guard of honour in U.N mission

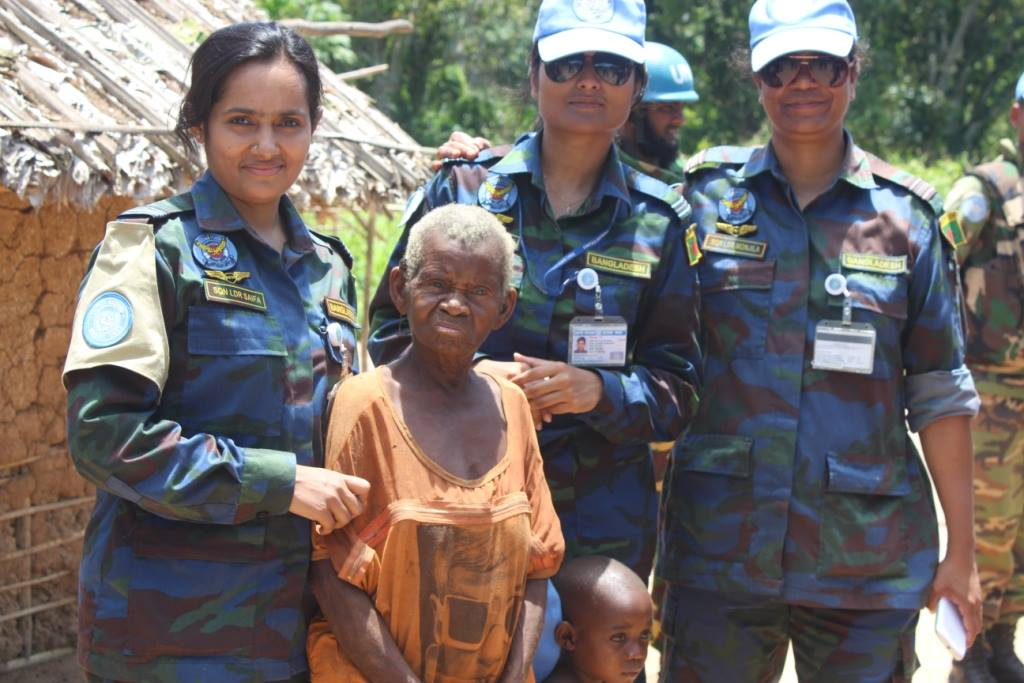
BANAIR-13 Democratic Republic Congo

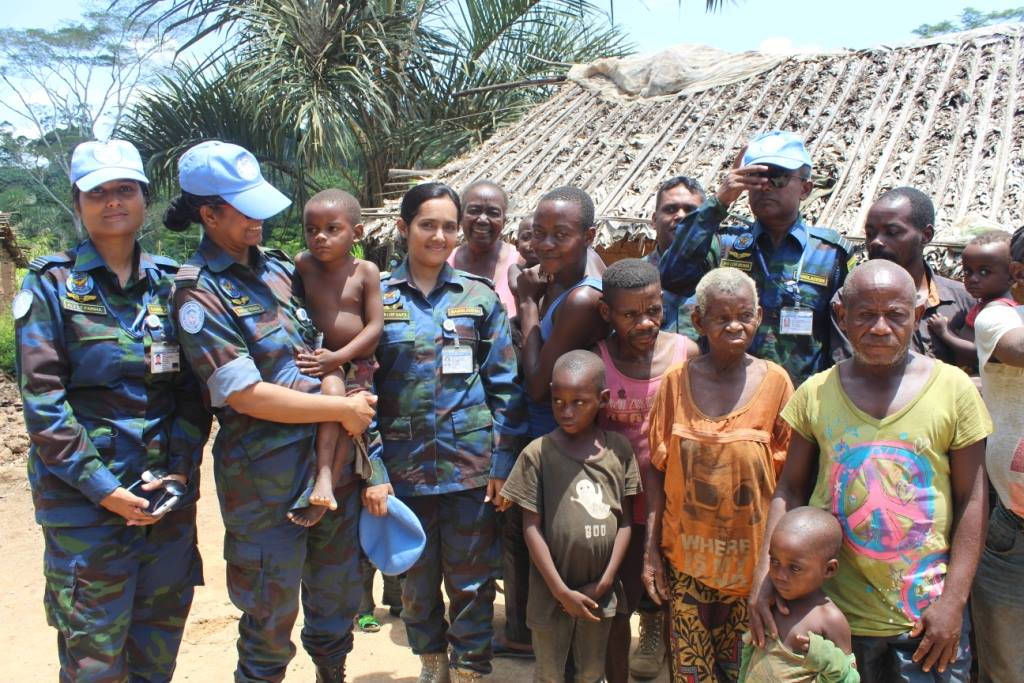
BANAIR-13 Mambasa

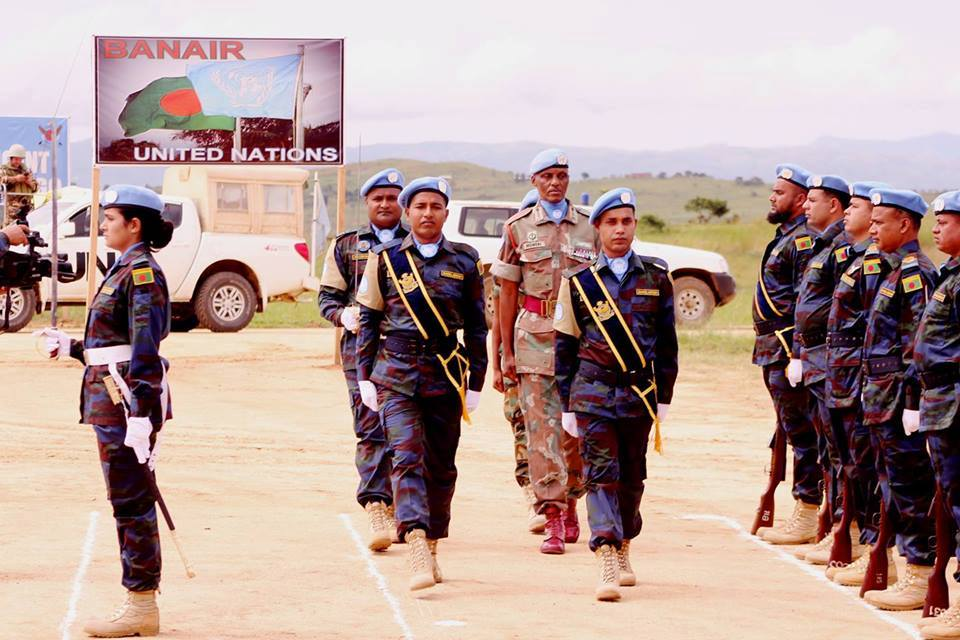
Bangladesh UN Peacekeeping Force-2

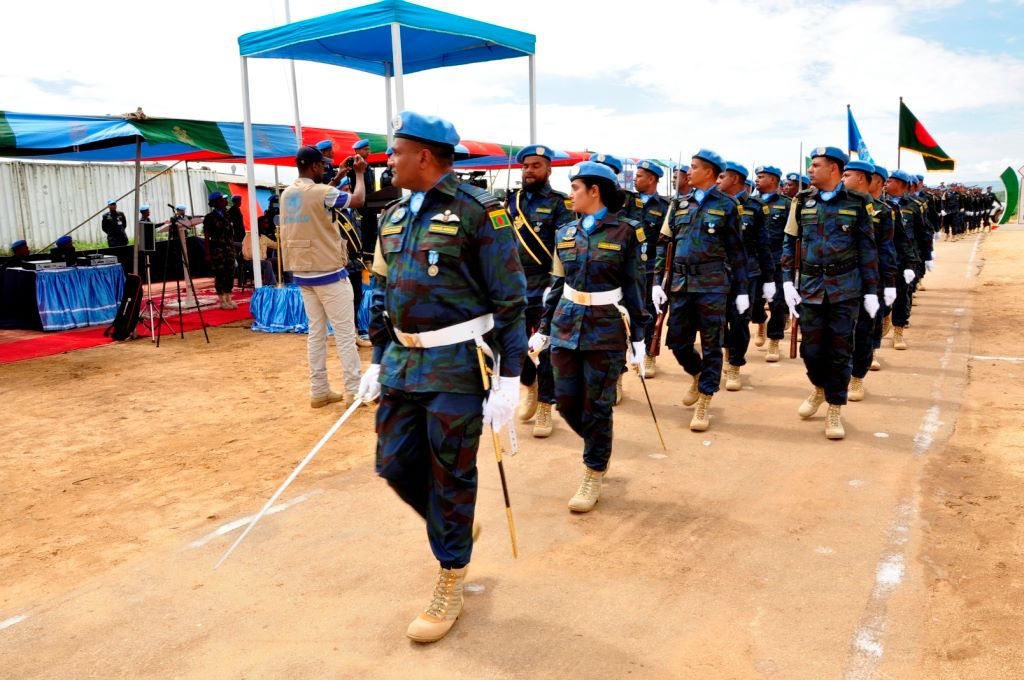
Bangladesh UN Peacekeeping Force-3

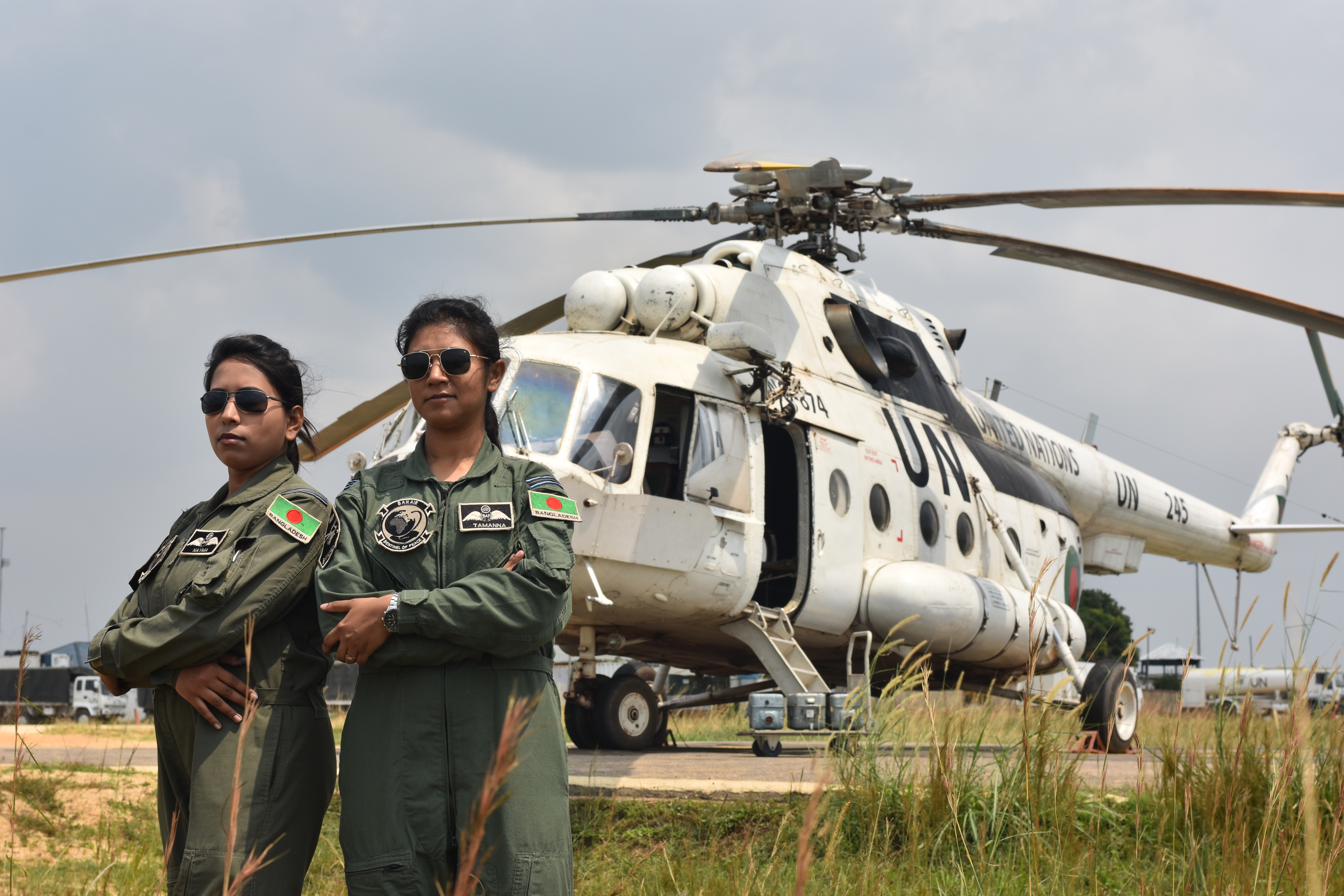
Photo MONUSCO - BAF female pilots

== See also ==
- Women in Bangladesh
- Military history of Bangladesh
