= English-medium schools in Bangladesh =

English medium school is one of the education systems in Bangladesh that follows mostly the curriculum of Edexcel and Cambridge of UK and other curriculums of other countries also, such as IB curriculum. The main medium of education is English with English oriented textbooks. English-medium schools have a primary learning goal and objective in classes 6-10 of improving their textual concepts and cognitive language, then a second goal of properly using the English language for their academic careers, and thirdly to improve their grammatical comprehension.

English-medium schools are growing in popularity among the middle class, upper-middle-class and rich families. The English-medium schools not only teach the students about their own country but also about the International History and English Literature.

The exams of the O-level and A-level students of Edexcel and Cambridge are conducted through British Council Bangladesh. The Daily Star Award is the most prestigious award provided to O-Level and A-Level examinees of Bangladesh, for their extraordinary academic performance. The criteria for an award are: 6 'A's in O-Levels, 3 'A's in A-Levels, and highest marks in O-Levels and A-Levels.

== Language ==
The English-medium schools teach most of the subjects in English. Bengali is a respected subject taught in these schools. The St Francis Xavier's Green Herald International School also teaches French to its students from Class 5 onwards and International School Dhaka having Spanish and French taught.

== Criticisms ==
Critics of English medium curriculum point out that the students of English-medium are weak in their mother-tongue (Bengali). They say that in English-medium students are less patriotic. These criticisms are similar to those that can be found in English-medium education. This is not always true, however. These days, schools try their best to educate their students about their own culture. Also, the students are not taught the social studies courses which sometimes discusses about the social problems the government is dealing with. There are allegations that English medium schools charge extra money from students.

== History ==
St Francis Xavier's Green Herald International School is the first English medium school in Bangladesh which was established in 1912. English-medium institutions in Bangladesh have been ascending due to the rise in globalization and the free market economy. Bangladesh government released projects to increase the English language through the English Language Teaching Improvement Project in 1990 with the UK and the 'English in Action' project in 2009.

== See also ==
- Army International Islamic Institute
