= Army International Islamic Institute =

- আর্মি ইন্টারন্যাশনাল ইসলামিক ইনস্টিটিউট

Location
- Jolshiri Abashan, Purbachal; Dhaka; Bangladesh

Information
- Other name: AIII
- Type: Private English-medium school
- Established: January 20, 2026; 9 months ago (foundation stone); August 3, 2026; 3 months ago (inaugurated)
- Authority: Bangladesh Army
- Chairman: Brigadier General Md. Humayun Kabir, SUP (Bar), SPP, ndc, psc, MPhil
- Principal: Lieutenant Colonel Syed Nazmur Rahman, SGP, G (Retd.)
- Teaching staff: 13
- Language: English
- Campus type: Urban
- Website: www.aiii.edu.bd

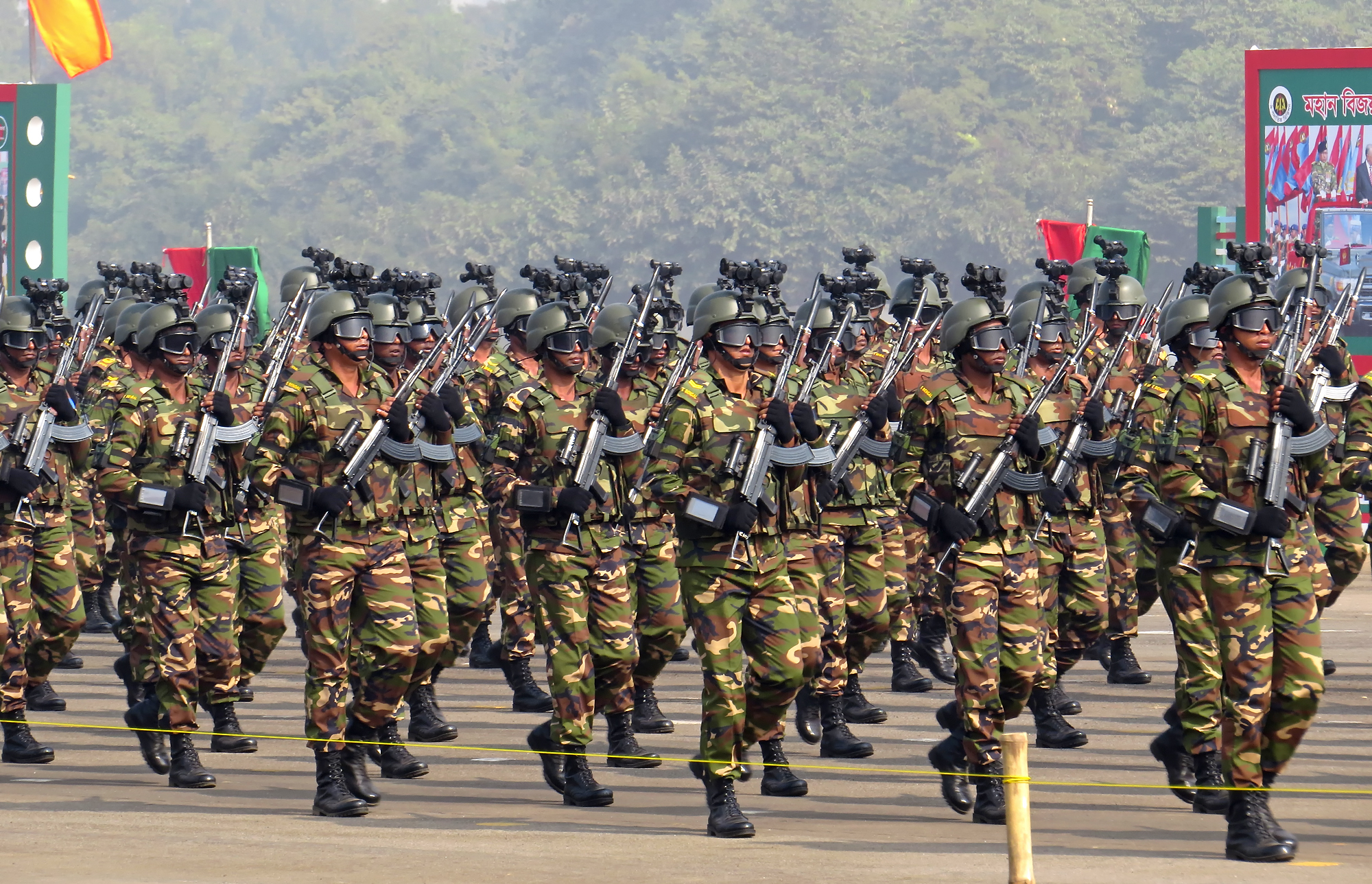
Bangladesh Army modular infantry

The Army International Islamic Institute (AIII) is a Bangladeshi educational institution managed by the Bangladesh Army. It was inaugurated on 3 August 2026. The Bangladesh Army states that the institute combines Cambridge curriculum-based English-medium education with Islamic values and moral education. The institute is expected to expand through the establishment of seven additional campuses, according to the Bangladesh Army.

== History ==
The Army International Islamic Institute was inaugurated on 3 August 2026 by the Chief of Army Staff, General Waker-Uz-Zaman, at the institute's first campus in the Jolshiri Abashan housing development in Dhaka.

According to the Bangladesh Army, the institute forms part of its educational activities. During the inauguration, General Waker-Uz-Zaman said that separating modern and Islamic education limits students' development. He stated that combining the two systems could help promote students' academic, moral, and social development.

== Expansion plan ==
During the ceremony, General Waker-Uz-Zaman laid the foundation stones for seven planned AIII campuses by video teleconference. The planned locations are:

- Barishal
- Savar
- Bogura
- Sylhet
- Chattogram
- Cumilla
- Jashore

== Academic and educational focus ==
According to official information released by the Bangladesh Army, the institute combines Cambridge curriculum-based English-medium education with value-based and religious education.

The educational philosophy of the AIII is to develop students who are knowledgeable, ethical, and patriotic citizens. The initiative prioritizes leadership, discipline, morality, and humanitarian values, all grounded in the teachings of the Quran and Sunnah. The Bangladesh Army envisions this institution as a premier center of excellence, dedicated to developing responsible leaders who will serve both the nation and the global community.

== See also ==
- Education in Bangladesh
- Bangladesh Army
- English-medium schools in Bangladesh
- Cambridge International Examinations
