= Susane Giti =

Bangladeshi first female Major General

- সুসানে গীতি
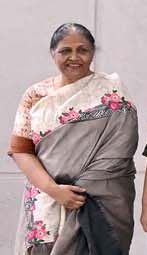
- Giti in 2024
- Education: Rajshahi Medical College
- Military career
- Allegiance: Bangladesh
- Branch: Bangladesh Army
- Service years: 1986–2023
- Rank: Major General
- Unit: Army Medical Corps
- Commands: Commandant of the Armed Forces Institute of Patholigy; Head(Pathology) of Armed Forces Medical College; Head(Hematology) of CMH, Dhaka; Commandant of CMH, Rajshahi
- Conflicts: MINUSMA; UNOCI
- Awards: Sena Utkorsho Padak(SUP)

Susane Giti (Note: SUP, FCPS) is a retired two-star medical officer of the Bangladesh Army and former commandant of the Armed Forces Institute of Pathology. She is the first two-star female officer of the army.

== Education ==
Giti obtained an MBBS degree from Rajshahi Medical College in 1985 and taught Rubia Khanam during 1995. She received her FCPS degree in haematology in 1996.

== Career ==
Giti joined the medical wing of the Bangladesh armed forces as a captain in 1986. She worked as a pathology specialist in UN Mission and different military hospitals. On 30 September 2018, Giti was promoted to major general and designated as head of the Pathology Department of the Armed Forces Medical College. General Giti retired from the army in February 2023.

== Personal life ==
Giti is married to Brigadier General (retd) Md Hossain Saad, who was a physician in the army medical corps.

== See also ==
Footnotes

- Women in the Bangladesh Army
