= Army Corps of Clerks =

Army Corps of Clerks (ACC)
- আর্মি কোর অব ক্লার্ক (এসিসি)
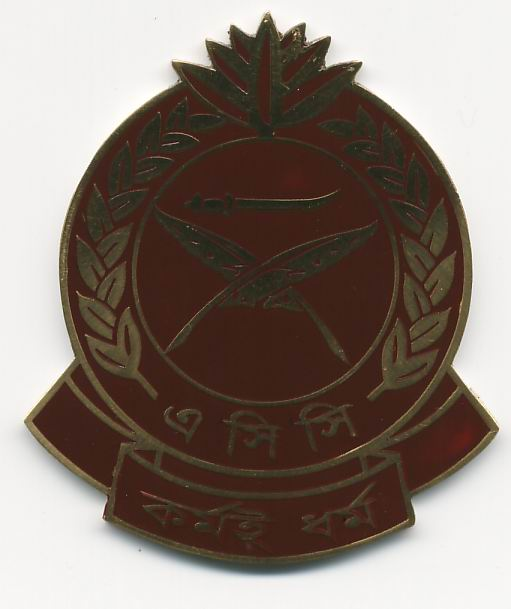
- Beret Badge of the Army Corps of Clerks
- Active: 22 July 1974 – present
- Country: Bangladesh
- Branch: Bangladesh Army
- Type: Staff clerk
- Size: Classified
- Garrison/HQ: Army Clerical Corps Center; Saidpur Cantonment, Bangladesh
- Motto: Duty is Divinity
- Colors: Azar Blue in beret Caps.
- Engagements: Bangladesh Liberation War

The Army Corps of Clerks (ACC) of the Bangladesh Army is responsible for providing military clerks and stenographers. It supports units including the staff branch of the formation and station headquarters, all Army Schools of Instruction and Colleges (including the Staff College and the Bangladesh Military Academy) and the Bangladesh Military attaches abroad and to certain specified appointments in Army Headquarters and in all Remount Veterinary & Farm Corps units. These Corps have only static units of their own, i.e., the ACC Centre in the Saidpur Cantonment and has no officers of its own.

The corps began on 22nd July 1974 with 200 clerks.
