= Armed Forces Institute of Pathology, Bangladesh =

Institution affiliated with Bangladesh armed forces

The Armed Forces Institute of Pathology is a medical research laboratory and premier diagnostic institution of the Bangladesh Armed Forces. It is situated in Dhaka Cantonment. Major General Nishat Jubaida is the current commandant and Brigadier General Abdullah-Al-Baki (Retd.) is the current consultant of this institution.

== History ==
The Army Pathological Laboratory (APL) was established as a small laboratory in 1951 as part of the Pakistan Army. After the independence of Bangladesh it became part of the Bangladesh Army. In 1974, APL was restructured and re-equipped with modern equipment. In 1987, the institute was awarded the Independence Day Award. In 1991, APL was renamed to Armed Forces Institute of Pathology. This institute is recognized by the Bangladesh College of Physicians and Surgeons (BCPS), University of Dhaka, Bangabandhu Sheikh Mujib Medical University (BSMMU) and also by Bangladesh University of Professionals (BUP) for postgraduate studies and training.
