= Bangladesh Army Medical Corps =

- Founded: 1971; 55 years ago
- Country: Bangladesh
- Allegiance: Bangladesh
- Branch: Bangladesh Army
- Type: Combined and combat support service
- Role: Administrative and providing medical services
- Nickname: AMC
- Motto: সমরে ও শান্তিতে রাখিব সুস্থ
- Colors: Maroon

The Bangladesh Army Medical Corps is a Combat support branch of the Bangladesh Army. Its primary responsibilities are military medicine and providing medical support to personnel during war and operations.

== History ==
The Army Medical Corps started its journey right after independence of Bangladesh. During the Liberation War of Bangladesh, the Bengali personnel from Pakistan Army Medical Corps had taken part in the war. 137 personnel of the corps were killed in action. Among the JCO and NCOs, one of them received Bir Uttom, three Bir Bikrom and one Bir Protik. Two JCOs who had survived were given Bir Bikrom and Bir Protik.

During the war, then Squadron Leader Shamsul Haque was appointed as the Director General Military Services. Other military officers like Major Khurshid Uddin Ahmed, Major Shamsul Alam, Major Maksul Hussain, Captain Mohasseb Hossain, Lieutenant Muktar Kamal, Lieutenant Abul Hossain from Medical Corps had joined the war and served the wounded soldiers. Captain Sitara Begum was one of the female officers from AMC who was awarded Bir Protik.

== Aims and objectives ==
The primary task of the AMC is to provide medical services to the serving, veteran and wounded soldiers. Apart from these, personnel from AMC often engage in giving free treatments to common people in numerous places of the country.

AMC personnel also play a vital role as peacekeepers. They are often deployed in foreign countries, and they provide medical facilities for free of cost. They were previously deployed to numerous UN missions, notably MINUSMA, UNOCI and UNMISS.

== Units ==
As per the official update from Directorate General of Medical Services, the AMC Field Ambulance has 22 units which are mentioned below:

1. 5th Field Ambulance - Functional Main Dressing Station (MDS)
2. 7th Field Ambulance - Functional Main Dressing Station (MDS)
3. 10th Field Ambulance
4. 11th Field Ambulance
5. 15th Field Ambulance
6. 18th Field Ambulance - Functional Main Dressing Station (MDS)
7. 21st Field Ambulance
8. 25th Field Ambulance
9. 31st Field Ambulance
10. 35th Field Ambulance
11. 41st Field Ambulance
12. 45th Field Ambulance - Functional Main Dressing Station (MDS)
13. 51st Field Ambulance
14. 55th Field Ambulance
15. 61st Field Ambulance
16. 71st Field Ambulance
17. 75th Field Ambulance
18. 81st Field Ambulance
19. 85th Field Ambulance
20. 91st Field Ambulance
21. 95th Field Ambulance
22. 101st Field Ambulance

== Lists of CMH (Combined Military Hospital) ==
As per the official update from Directorate General of Medical Services, the AMC has 20 CMHs which are mentioned below:

1. Combined Military Hospital Dhaka
2. Combined Military Hospital Chottagram
3. Combined Military Hospital Bogra
4. Combined Military Hospital Jessore
5. Combined Military Hospital Comilla
6. Combined Military Hospital Rangpur
7. Combined Military Hospital Ghatail
8. Combined Military Hospital Savar
9. Combined Military Hospital Ramu
10. Combined Military Hospital Jalalabad
11. Combined Military Hospital Saidpur
12. Combined Military Hospital Momenshahi
13. Combined Military Hospital Quadirabad
14. Combined Military Hospital Rajshahi
15. Combined Military Hospital Rajendrapur
16. Combined Military Hospital Jahanabad
17. Combined Military Hospital Alikadam
18. Combined Military Hospital Dighinala
19. Combined Military Hospital Ruma
20. Combined Military Hospital Bhatiary
