= Sitara Begum =

Bangladeshi doctor, army officer and war heroine

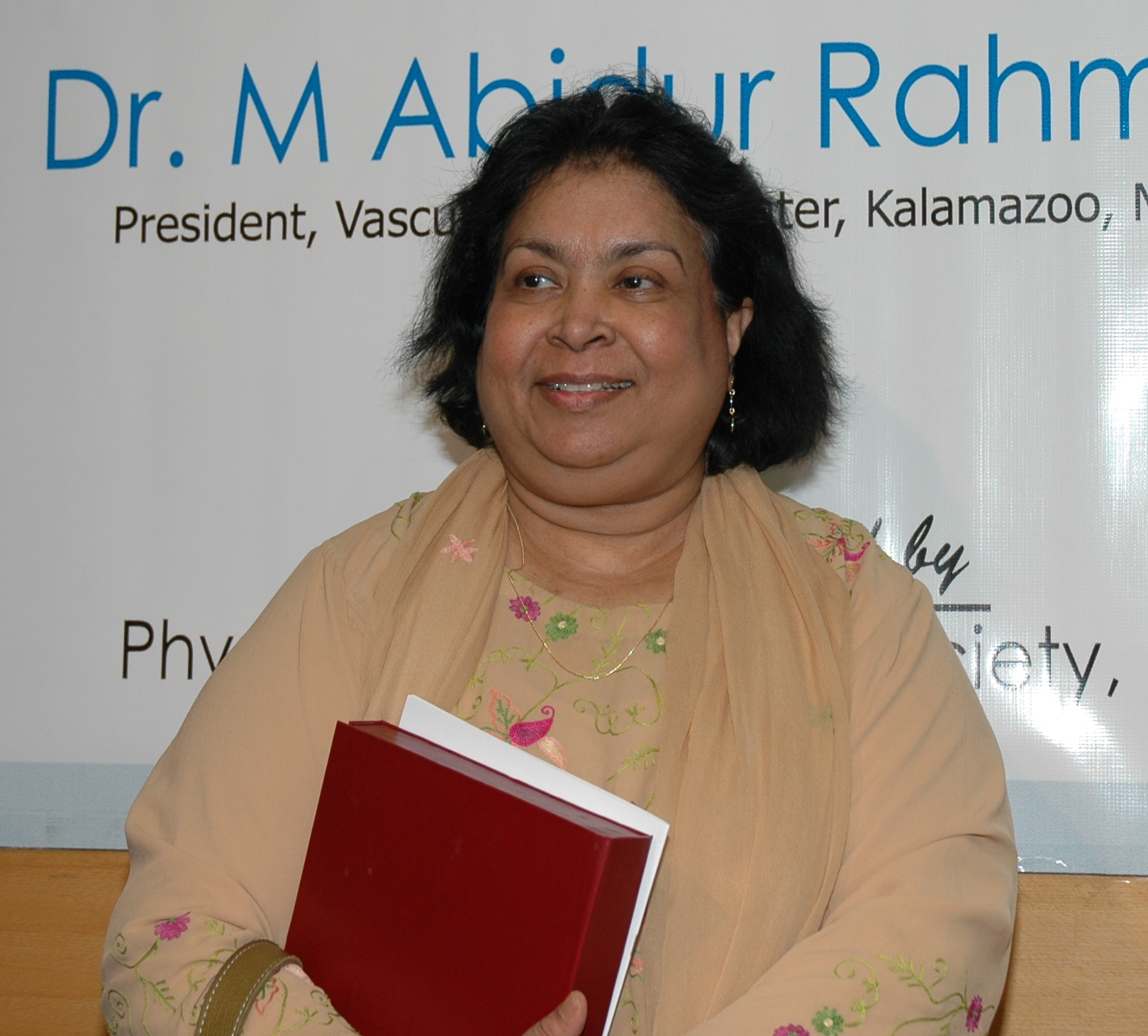
- Begum in 2009

Personal details
- Born: 5 September 1946 (age 80) Mymensingh District, Bengal Province, British India (present-day Kishoreganj District, Bangladesh)
- Citizenship: British subject (1946–1947); Pakistan (1947–1971); Bangladesh (1971–present)
- Relations: Abu Taher Mohammad Haider (brother)
- Awards: Bir Pratik

Military service
- Allegiance: Pakistan (1970–1971); Bangladesh (1971–1973)
- Branch/service: Pakistan Army; Mukti Bahini; Bangladesh Army
- Years of service: 1970–1973
- Rank: Captain
- Unit: Pakistan Army Medical Corps
- Battles/wars: Bangladesh Liberation War

Dr. Captain Sitara Begum is a Bangladeshi doctor, army officer, and war hero. She is one of two women in Bangladesh who have received the Bir Protik award. She served during the Liberation War of Bangladesh in 1971.

== Early life ==
Begum was born in Kishoreganj in 1946. Her father, Israil Mian, was a lawyer. She graduated from Holy Cross College, Dhaka. She completed her MBBS from Dhaka Medical College. She has two sisters and has two brothers, one of which was Major Abu Taher Mohammad Haider.

== Career ==
Begum was commissioned in the Medical Corps of the Pakistan Army in 1970 as a lieutenant. She was stationed in Comilla Cantonment along with her brother. During the beginning of the Non-cooperation movement, she was in Kishoreganj for the Eid holidays, away from the cantonment. After the start of the Bangladesh Liberation War, she and her parents moved from Kishorganj to Meghalaya with the aid of Mukti Bahini members.

Captain Dr. Sitara was the commanding officer of the hospital known as the Bangladesh Field Hospital, with almost 400 beds under Sector 2 in 1971. She would have to travel to Agartala to gather the necessary medical supplies. The hospital catered to Bengali patients, wounded freedom fighters, and also members of the Indian army who sought medical aid at the centre.

She returned to Dhaka after the independence of Bangladesh.

Begum left Bangladesh after her brother was killed in the 7 November 1975 Bangladesh coup d'état and settled in the United States.

In 2025, she along with her husband Mohammad Abidur Rahman published a book titled Weeping Heart: Memoir of a Liberation War Physician. The book is her memoir of the Bangladesh Liberation War, a condemnation of the genocide and a call for justice.

== See also ==
- Women in the Bangladesh Army
