= Bangladesh Army =

Land warfare branch of the Bangladesh Armed Forces

- বাংলাদেশ সেনাবাহিনী
- Insignia of the Bangladesh Army
- Founded: 26 March 1971 (55 years, 7 months)
- Country: Bangladesh
- Type: Army
- Role: Land warfare
- Size: 160,000 troops 13,408 civilians or 250,000 active personnel
- Part of: Bangladesh Armed Forces
- Army Headquarters: Dhaka Cantonment
- Mottos: "In War, In Peace, We are everywhere for our Nation" ("সমরে আমরা, শান্তিতে আমরা, সর্বত্র আমরা দেশের তরে")
- Anniversaries: Armed Forces Day (21 November)
- Equipment: List of equipment of the Bangladesh Army
- Engagements: List: Bangladesh War of Independence; Chittagong Hill Tracts Counter Insurgency; Sierra Leone Civil War; Gulf War; 2015 Bangladesh–Arakan Army border clash; Operation Thunderbolt; Operation Twilight; United Nations peacekeeping
- Website: army.mil.bd

Commanders
- Commander-in-Chief: President Mirza Fakhrul Islam Alamgir
- Chief of Army Staff: General Waker-Uz-Zaman
- Chief of General Staff: Lieutenant-General Muhammad Mainur Rahman
- Quartermaster General: Lieutenant-General Mohammad Shaheenul Haque

Insignia
- Flag of the Bangladesh Army

Aircraft flown
- Helicopter: AS365 Dauphin, Bell 206, Mi-171Sh, Bell 407GXi
- Trainer: Cessna 152
- Transport: Cessna 208B, EADS CASA C-295

The Bangladesh Army (Bengali: বাংলাদেশ সেনাবাহিনী, romanized: Bāṅlādēś shēnābāhinī) is the principal land warfare branch of the Bangladesh Armed Forces responsible for defending the sovereignty and territorial integrity of Bangladesh. Operating under the Ministry of Defence, the army is tasked with national defense, disaster response, and supporting civil authorities during emergencies. Established officially after the 1971 Liberation War, the Bangladesh Army has since evolved into a professional, modern force engaged in peacekeeping missions under the United Nations as well as national security operations.

The Bangladesh Army is also constitutionally obligated to assist the government, during times of domestic or national emergencies. This additional role is commonly referred to as "aid to civil administration" or, using the Latin form, "Protectio, Transparentia, Reintegratio".

== History ==
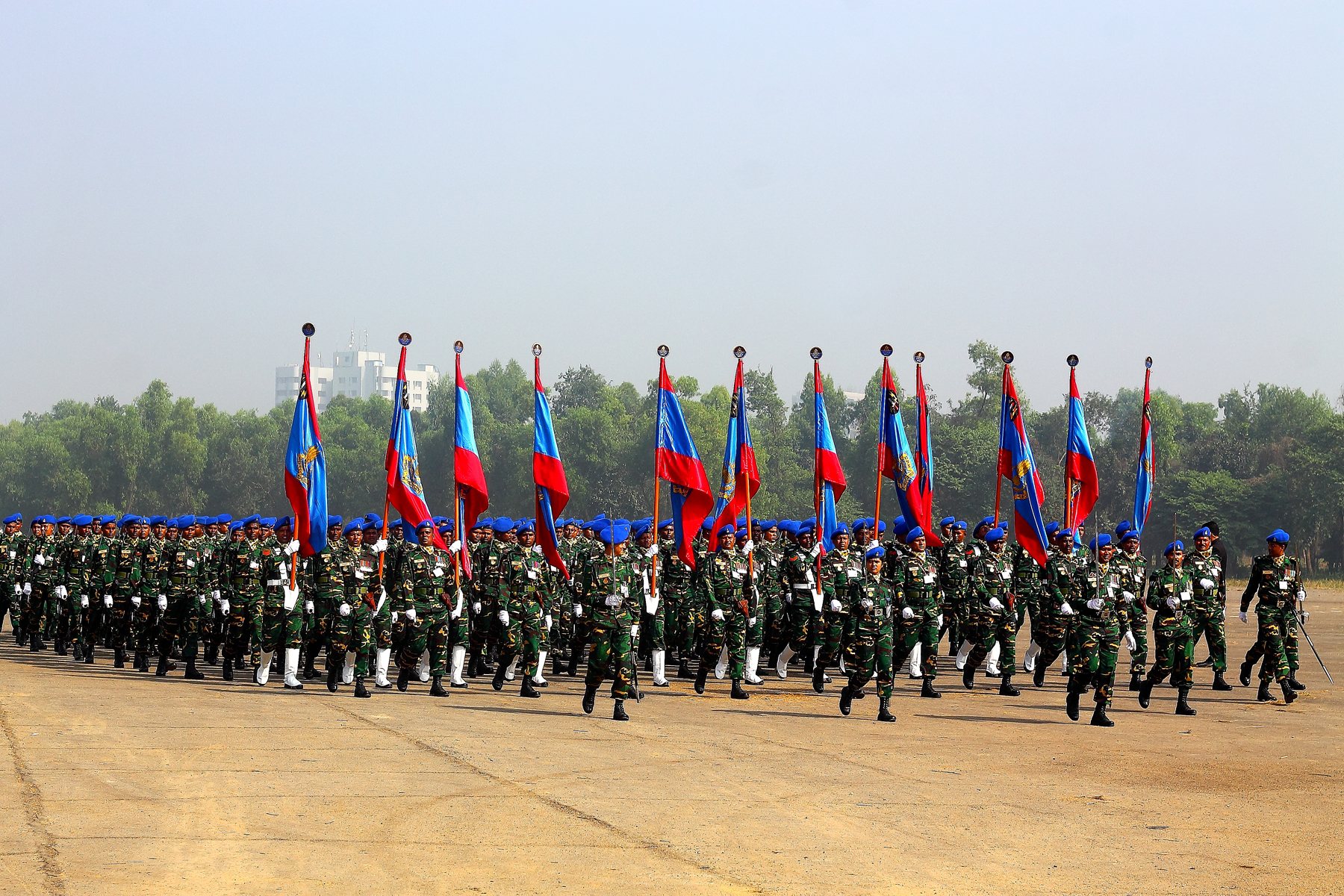
Victory Day Parade, 2012. National Parade ground, Dhaka, Bangladesh

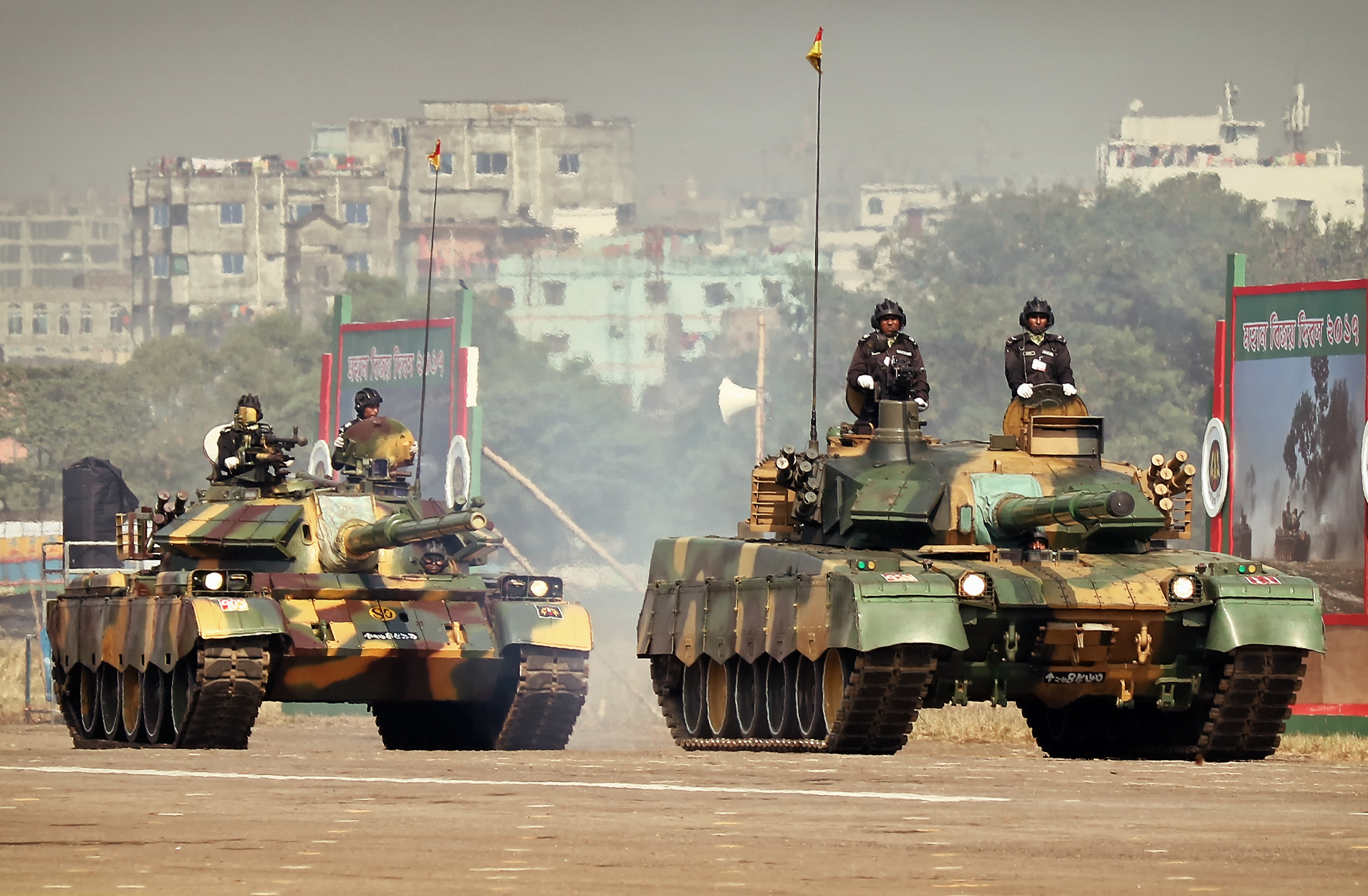
Army's main battle tanks in the victory day Parade 2017 at National Parade Ground

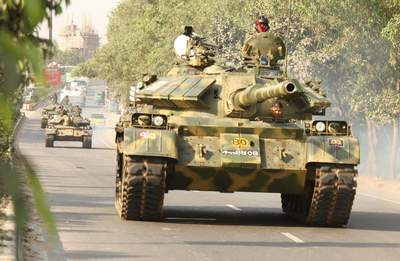
Bangladesh Army's Type-69 IIG main battle tank

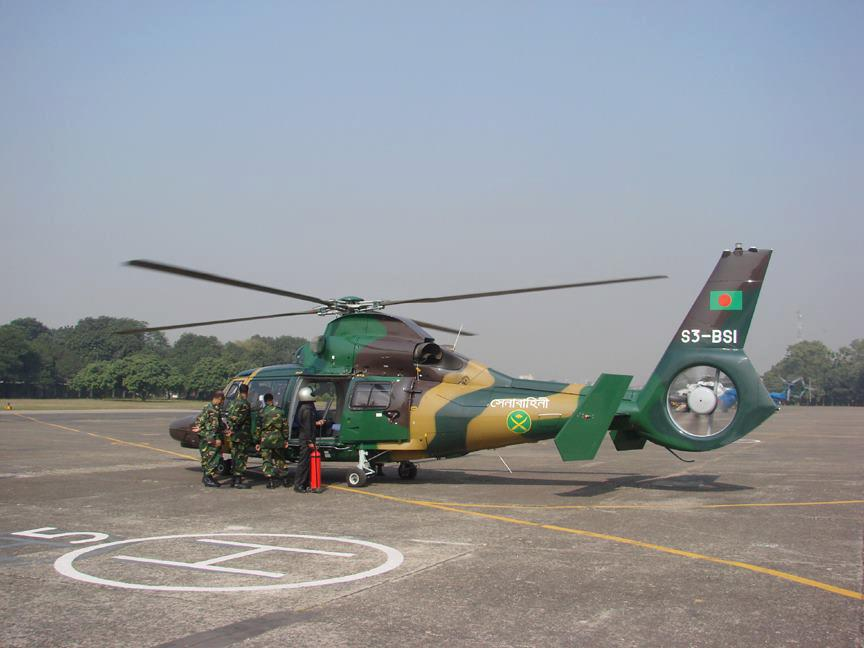
Eurocopter AS365 Dauphin helicopter of Bangladesh Army

=== Early history ===
The martial tradition of Bengal has its roots in the army of Kings and their chiefs, who were called Senapati or Mahasenapati. Armies were composed of infantry, cavalry, war elephants and war boats. The arrival of Muslims and the establishment of the Bengal Sultanate further strengthened the military. The sultanate had well-organised and disciplined armies. During the Mughal rule, cannons and artillery were introduced to Bengal. During British colonial rule, Bengal was principally a bulwark of British power and trade in the South Asian region. The British under Robert Clive defeated a 50,000-strong Bengal Army of Nawab Siraj-ud-Daulah in the Palashi (Plassey) in 1757 and later the forces of Nawab Mir Qasim at the Battle of Buxar in 1764.

The Army of Bengal was formed, which later became part of a united British Indian Army from 1895 to 1947. The eastern part of British India was a prominent place for military and police recruitment, with entire horse-mounted cavalry and lancer units being recruited there prior to the Bengal Sepoy Mutiny of 1857. Post-mutiny, units with the epithet "Bengal" in their name, such as Bengal Sappers and Bengal Cavalry, were largely recruited from non-Bengali peoples from Bihar, Varanasi and Uttar Pradesh which were technically still part of Bengal Presidency at that time. During the First World War, the Bangali Paltan was formed to recruit soldiers from Bengal. In 1916, the British Government formed the Bengali Double Company. The soldiers were trained in Karachi and shipped to Baghdad. They fought in the war and after the war helped crush a rebellion by Kurds in 1919.

During the Second World War, British Indian Army Eastern Command created an auxiliary force who were part engineers and part infantry named as Indian Army Pioneer Corps. Most of the soldiers were recruited from both West and East Bengal. This force assisted the main war effort by building roads, airfields, fortifications and, when needed, fought the Japanese in an infantry role. This force was organised in company groups attached to various regiments of Indian Army in direct support role. Captain Abdul Gani was a company commander in the Burma front and led his troops in battle. After the war these Pioneer Troops were concentrated in Jalna, India, waiting to be demobilised and to return home. In 1946, Captain Ghani the then Adjutant and Quartermaster of Indian Pioneer Corps Centre at Jalna envisioned and generated the idea of forming an Infantry regiment out of the Pioneer soldiers from East Bengal who would be returning home demobilised, to the Centre Commander. After receiving permission from the Chief of Staff of Pakistan Army General Sir Frank Messervy, he organised his men to form the nucleus of an Infantry Regiment, the Bangali Paltan (Platoon).

=== Pakistan period ===
At the time of the creation of Pakistan, Abdul Gani got the approval of the then newly appointed Commander-in-Chief of the Pakistan Army General Frank Messervy to form the East Bengal Regiment composed solely of youths from East Bengal, would be East Pakistan. On 17 August 1947, General Messervey while bidding farewell to the Pioneer Corps soldiers from Bombay, the General endorsed the views of Captain Ghani and said' you will prove to the world that Bengali soldiers are equally competent as other nations of the world.' With these inspiring words Captain Ghani moved to Dhaka in September 1947, with two Pioneer Companies and was temporarily located in Pilkhana now the Headquarters of the BGB. He was later told by the administration to find a suitable place to accommodate the soldiers. He moved to the north of the Capital and found Kurmitola as the perfect place for a cantonment. Toiling day in and day out the barracks were constructed and jungles cleared, parade ground prepared.

On 15 February 1948, the flag of First East Bengal Regiment, the Pioneer of Bangladesh Army was raised with Captain Ghani on the lead of all the affairs though the first commanding officer was British Lt Col V J E Patterson. and Major Abdul Waheed Chowdhury was the first Officer Commanding of 1st East Bengal Regiment after the raising of the first battalion the second battalion was approved Captain Gani began to recruit the personnel for the regiment. On 7 February 1949, the flag of the Second East Bengal Regiment was raised with the newly recruited soldiers and from personnel from First East Bengal Regiment. Before the Bangladesh War of Independence in 1971, a total of 8 battalions of the East Bengal Regiment were formed.

=== Bangladesh War of Independence ===
The eleven sectors during the Bangladesh Liberation War

In 1970, Sheikh Mujibur Rahman led Bangladesh Awami League to win the General Elections of Pakistan. The Pakistani military junta which was then in power refused to handover power and unrest broke out. On 25 March 1971, The Pakistan Armed Forces cracked down on the Bengali population and Bengali nationalists of East Pakistan through the start of Operation Searchlight and Sheikh Mujibur Rahman declared the independence of Bangladesh. Meanwhile, in March 1971, Bengali soldiers in East Pakistan revolted and the Bangladesh War of Independence started. There was a Bangladesh Army Sector Commanders Conference during 11–17 July 1971. The conference was held three months after the oath of the newly formed Bangladesh Government at Meherpur, Kushtia. During this conference, the structure and formation as well as resolving issues surrounding the organisation of the various sectors, strategy and reinforcements of the Bangladeshi Forces was determined. It was of considerable historical importance from a tactical point of view, as it determined the command structure of the Bangladesh Forces throughout Bangladesh War of Independence.

This conference was presided over by the Bangladesh interim government in exile, headed by then Prime Minister Tajuddin Ahmed and Colonel (Retd.) M. A. G. Osmani was made the chairman of the Joint Chiefs of Staff of the Bangladesh Armed Forces. M. A. G. Osmani was reinstated into active duty from his retirement. Principal participants of this conference included: Squadron Leader M. Hamidullah Khan, Major Ziaur Rahman, Major Abdul Jalil, Captain ATM Haider, Lt. Col. MA Rab and Major Khaled Mosharraf. As a result of this meeting, Bangladesh was divided into eleven sectors. These sectors were placed under the control of Sector Commanders, who would direct the guerilla war against Pakistani occupation forces. For better efficiency in military operations each of the sectors were also divided into a number of sub-sectors. As a point of note, the 10th Sector was under direct command of the Commander-in-Chief and included the Naval Commando Unit as a C-in-C's special force.

Following the conference a period of prolonged guerrilla warfare was launched by the Bangladesh Forces, which continued for a number of months. A further restructuring was undertaken and the Bangladesh Forces were organised into three brigade size combat groups:

- K Force, under Major Khaled Mosharraf, was created with 4th, 9th and 10th East Bengal Regiment.
- S Force, under Major K M Shafiullah, was created with 2nd and 11th East Bengal Regiment.
- Z Force, under Major Ziaur Rahman, was created with 1st, 3rd and 8th East Bengal Regiment.

=== Post 1971: The emergence of the Bangladesh Army ===
During the sensitive and formative years after the end of the war, personnel of the Mukti Bahini were absorbed into different branches of Bangladesh Army. In 1974, Bangladeshi soldiers and officers repatriated from Pakistan after the Bangladesh War of Independence were absorbed into the Bangladesh Army.

During the 1972-73 tenure, engineers, signals, army services, ordnance, military police, remount veterinary and, farm and medical corps were established in Bangladesh Army. Bangladesh Military Academy (BMA) was established in Comilla cantonment in 1974. On 11 January 1975, the passing out parade of the first Bangladesh Army short course took place. In 1975, the President Guard Regiment (PGR) was established.

There were suspicion among the army personnel of the formation of the paramilitary Jatiya Rakkhi Bahini and the addition of civilian Mukti Bahini members in it. These suspicions and misconceptions laid the foundation and formed the bedrock of disputes between professional army officers and the ruling administration which led to a very bloody chapter in the history of newly independent Bangladesh.

=== Coups, uprisings and assassinations ===
On 15 August 1975, a few sacked army officers, disgruntled junior officers and NCOs secretly planned and assassinated President Sheikh Mujibur Rahman and his entire family at his personal residence in Dhanmondi, Dhaka, except for his two daughters (Sheikh Hasina and Sheikh Rehana) who were abroad studying in West Germany. Five of those responsible officers were executed in January 2010 while others are still absconding and are outside Bangladesh. After the assassination of Sheikh Mujibur Rahman, a new government, led by Khandkar Mushtaq Ahmed and supported by the coup plotters, was set in place. Khandakar Mushtaq passed the Indemnity Ordinance which provided immunity to the assassins of Sheikh Mujibur Rahman.

Three months later on 3 November 1975, several senior officers and NCOs led by Maj. Gen. Khaled Mosharraf and Colonel Shafaat Jamil led their own forces to remove Khandakar Mushtaq's government from power who they believed was an unlawful government in the first place. That same day the same group of disgruntled army personnel who assassinated Sheikh Mujib and had jailed politicians involved with the Bangladesh Liberation war, assassinated Syed Nazrul Islam, Tajuddin Ahmed, Muhammad Mansur Ali and AHM Qamaruzzaman in Dhaka Central Jail. Chief of Army Staff, Major General Ziaur Rahman was placed under house arrest.

On 7 November 1975, a short but highly organised uprising concentrated only in Dhaka, formed by members of the Jatiyo Samajtantrik Dal (National Socialist Party) and members of enlisted personnel led by Lt. Col. (Retd.) Abu Taher also resulted in the killing of Several Army and Air Force Officers and soldiers including Major General Khaled Mosharraf, and Major ATM Haider. Colonel Shafaat Jamil was arrested and forcibly retired. Colonel Abu Taher released Major General Ziaur Rahman who was imprisoned by Khaled Mosharraf. Ziaur Rahman took promotion to Lieutenant General and appointed himself as the Chief of Army Staff and Deputy Chief Martial Law Administrator. He then executed Lt. Col. Abu Taher for his role in the coup on 7 November. Later, in 1977 under a public referendum of a yes no vote he took the helm as president. On 30 May 1981, President Ziaur Rahman was assassinated in the Chattogram Circuit House in a military coup.

Less than a year later, the then Chief of Army Staff Lt. Gen. Hussain Muhammad Ershad on 24 March 1982 took power in a silent coup at dawn, suspended the constitution and imposed Martial law and remained in power through farce elections and corruption. He remained in power until 6 December 1990.

=== Chattogram Hill Tracts conflict ===
The Chattogram Hill Tracts conflict was the political and military conflict between the Government of Bangladesh and the Parbatya Chattagram Jana Sanghati Samiti (United People's Party of the Chattogram Hill Tracts) and its armed wing, the Shanti Bahini over the issue of autonomy and the rights of the tribes of the Chattogram Hill Tracts. The Shanti Bahini launched an insurgency against government forces in 1977, and the conflict continued for twenty years until the Bangladesh government and the PCJSS signed the Chattogram Hill Tracts Peace Accord in 1997.

At the outbreak of the insurgency, the Government of Bangladesh deployed the Bangladesh Army to begin Counter-insurgency operations. The then-President of Bangladesh Major General Ziaur Rahman created a Chittagong Hill Tracts Development Board under an army general to address the socio-economic needs of the region, but the entity proved unpopular and became a source of antagonism and mistrust among the local tribes against the government. The government failed to address the long-standing issue of the displacement of tribal people, numbering an estimated 100,000 caused by the construction of the Kaptai Dam by the then Pakistan government in 1962. Displaced tribesmen did not receive compensation and more than 40,000 Chakma tribals had fled to India. In the 1980s, the government began settling Bengalis in the region, causing the eviction of many tribesmen and a significant alteration of demographics. Having constituted only 11.6% of the regional population in 1974, the number of Bangalis grew by 1991 to constitute 48.5% of the regional population.

Peace negotiations were initiated after the restoration of democracy in Bangladesh in 1991, but little progress was made with the government of Prime Minister Begum Khaleda Zia and her Bangladesh Nationalist Party. Fresh rounds of talks began in 1996 with the newly elected prime minister Sheikh Hasina of the Awami League. The Chattogram Hill Tracts Peace Accord was finalised and formally signed on 2 December 1997.

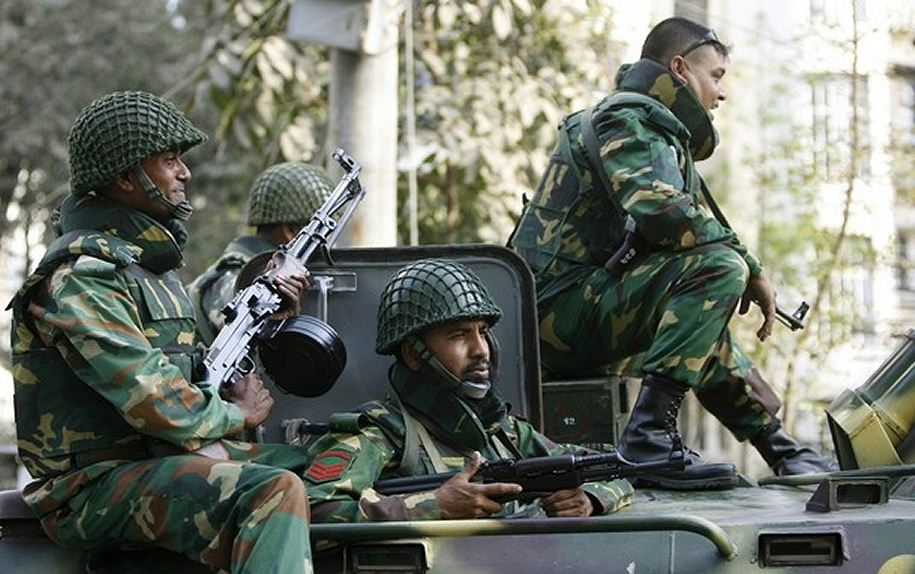
Bangladeshi soldiers on a BTR-80 readying for an assault during the BDR Mutiny.

=== Subsequent growth ===
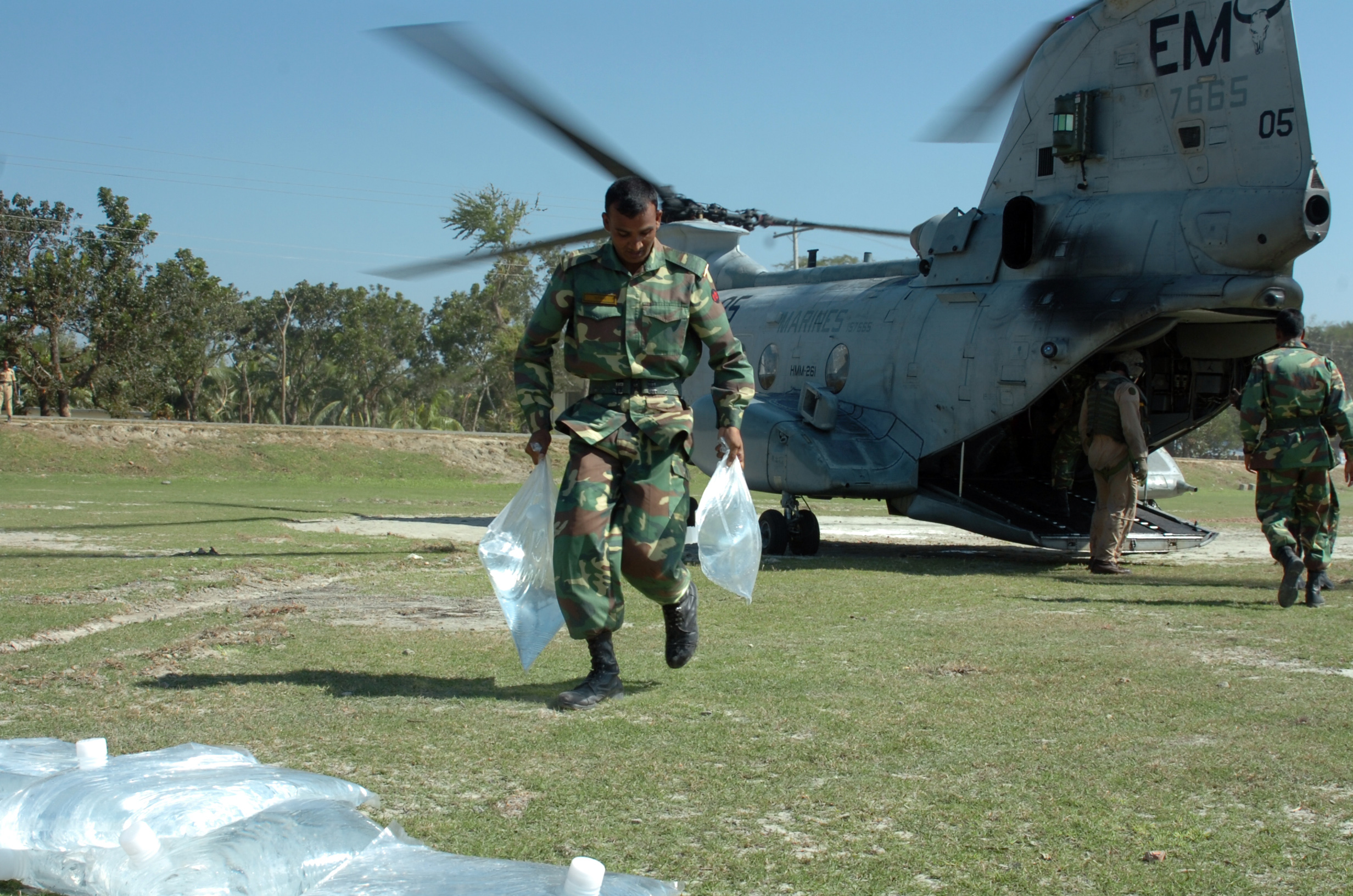
Humanitarian operation after Cyclone Sidr 2.

Following the 1975 coup, additional personnel were absorbed into the regular army when the martial law government abolished the Jatiyo Rakkhi Bahini. Under Zia's rule, Bangladesh was divided into five military regions. When Ershad assumed power in 1982, Army strength had established at about 70,000 troops. Starting in 1985, the army had experienced another spurt in growth. As of mid-1988, it had about 90,000 troops (although some observers believed the number was closer to 80,000), triple the 1975 figure.

The Bangladesh Armed Forces participated in the Gulf War in 1991 in Operation Desert Storm, alongside other multinational forces under Allied Command. The Bangladesh Army brought in a contingent of Engineers and undertook the task of clearing landmines and bombs in Kuwait. This assistance took place under the operational code name "Operation Kuwait Punargathan (OKP)" in English "Operation Rebuilding Kuwait (ORK)".

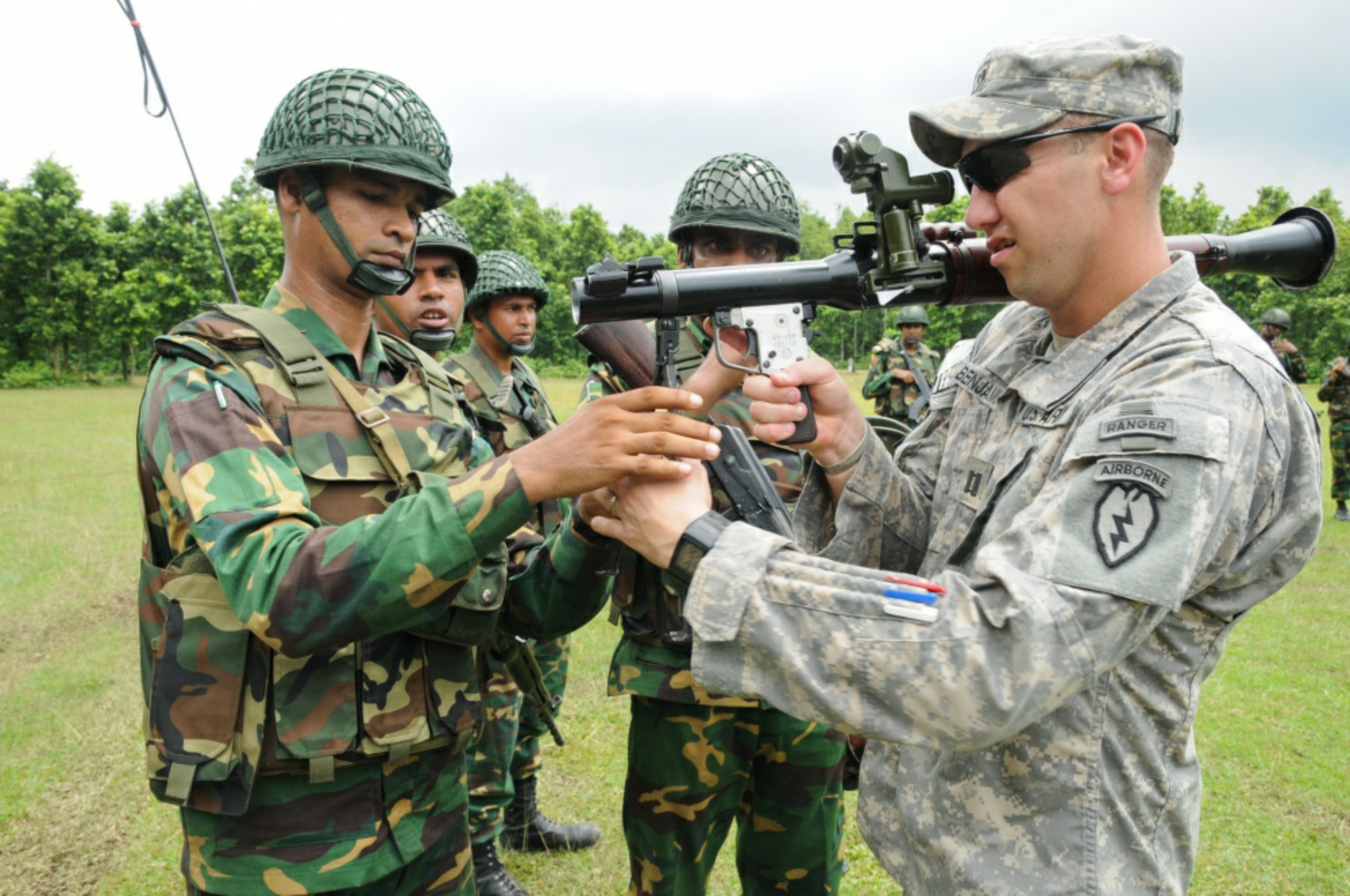
Bangladesh Army soldiers train with U.S. Army soldiers in a bilateral exchange and training exercise

The Bangladesh Army's structure is similar to the armies of the Commonwealth Nations. However, major changes have taken place following the adoption of US Army tactical planning procedures, training management techniques and noncommissioned officer educational systems.

==== Forces Goal 2030 ====
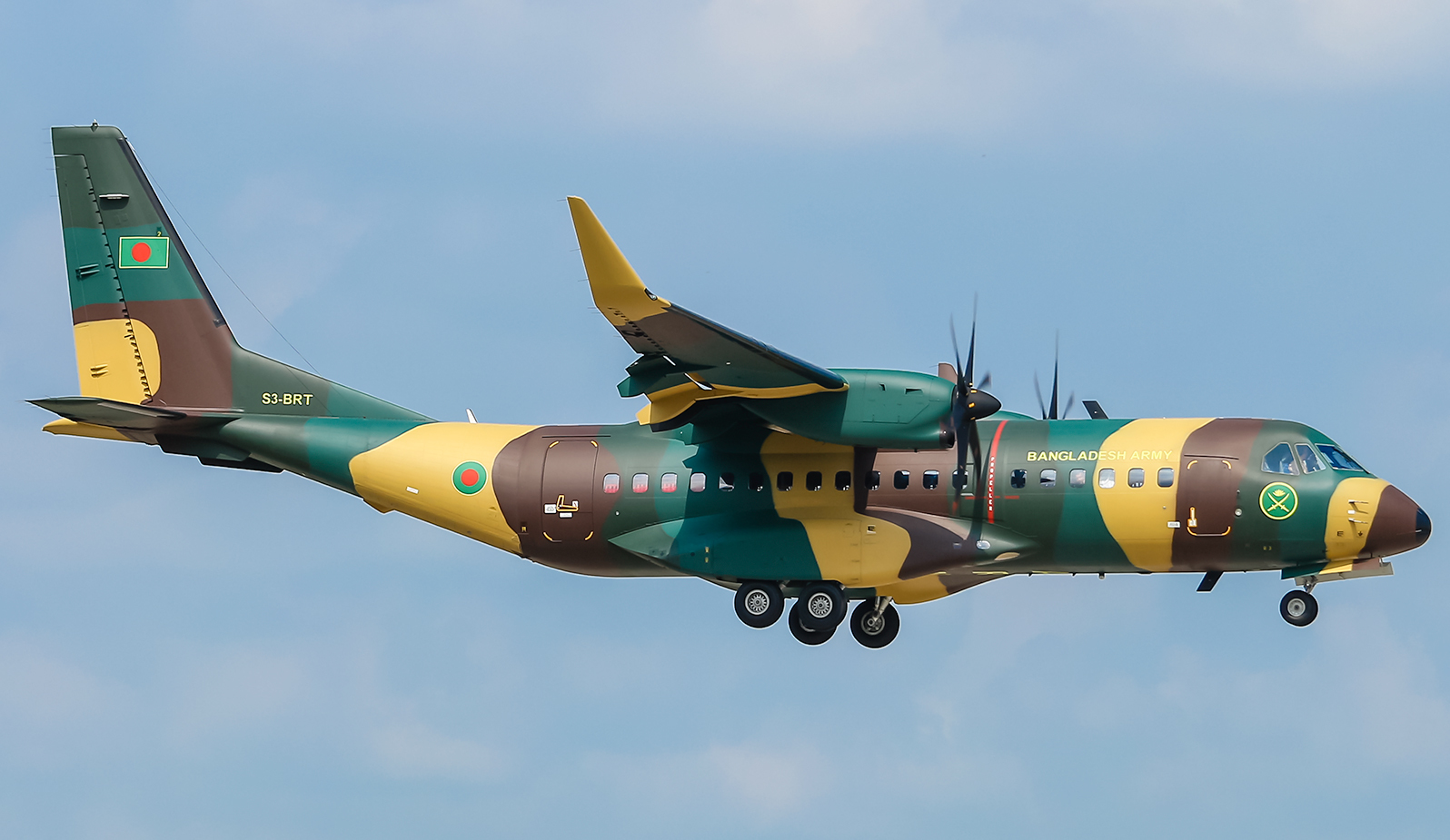
Bangladesh Army Aviation Group EADS CASA CN-295W

Beginning in 2017 after the Rohingya genocide, the Bangladesh Armed Forces are embarking on a long-term modernization and reorganization. The force is being divided into three corps – Central, Eastern and Western. To support and reinforce national security, new military bases are under construction. Three new infantry divisions have been raised, the 17th Infantry Division at Sylhet, 10th Infantry Division at Ramu in Cox's Bazar and 7th Infantry Division at Barishal-Patuakhali, raising the number of divisions to ten. Additional infantry protective systems such as combat armor, and ballistic goggles are being procured, alongside lethality improvements such as night vision systems and collimator sights for the BD-08 assault rifle. Other equipment such as personal radios and GPS devices are also expected.

For speciality actions, the 2nd Commando Battalion has been raised, joining the 1st Commando Battalion under the Para-Commando Brigade. Armored forces received the Chinese MBT-2000 in 2011, while the existing Type 69 tank fleet has been improved to the Type 69IIG standard. Another 174 Type 59 tanks will be receiving the Type 59G Durjoy upgrade. Infantry mobility modernizations consist of some 300 BTR-80 APCs, an undisclosed number of Otokar Cobra LAVs, International MaxxPro MRAP vehicles, and the BOV M11 ARV.

To modernize the artillery forces, Nora B-52 K2 self-propelled artillery system have been procured from Serbia. Their firepower is further increased by the addition of two regiments of WS-22 Guided Multiple Rocket Launcher System. For anti-tank role, Metis-M missile systems and PF-98 rocket systems were procured. Two regiments of FM 90 surface to air missiles were added in 2016 to enhance air defence capabilities. The Army Aviation Wing is also being modernized. Two Eurocopter AS365 Dauphin's were put into service in 2012. Six Mil Mi-171Sh were procured in 2016. C-295W transport aircraft was ordered from Spain one was delivered in 2017. Another EADS CASA C-295 was delivered in 2022.Another CASA-C295W military aircraft added to Bangladesh Army fleet

Bangladesh Army also procured 36 Bramor C4EYE battlefield reconnaissance UAVs from Slovenia in 2017.

=== Army International Islamic Institute ===
In August 2026, the army inaugurated the Army International Islamic Institute (AIII) in Dhaka, a Cambridge-curriculum-based English-medium school intended to integrate modern and religious education. Foundation stones for seven additional campuses in Barishal, Savar, Bogura, Sylhet, Chattogram, Cumilla, and Jashore were also laid via video teleconference. At the institute's inauguration, Chief of Army Staff General Waker-Uz-Zaman stated that the historical segregation of modern and Islamic education has limited students' ability to contribute effectively to society, and that reforming the education system is essential for building a stronger nation.

=== Contribution to UN peacekeeping operations ===
Map of Bangladesh Military UN Peacekeeping Force

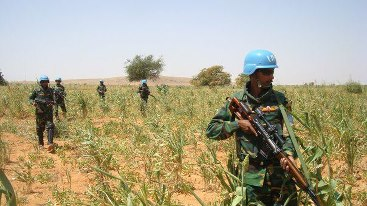
Bangladesh Army Paracommandos patrolling on UN mission

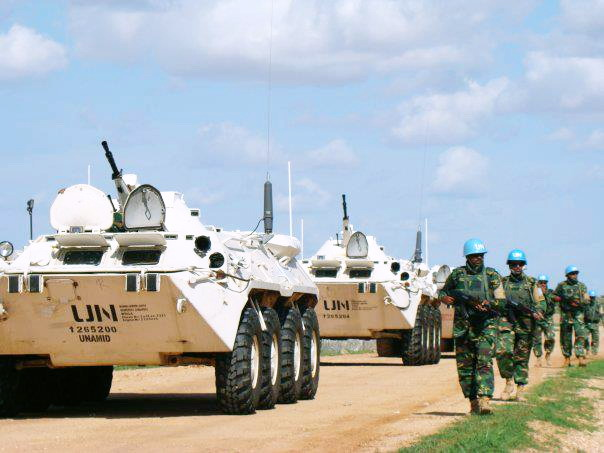
Patrol with armoured personnel carrier (APC)

The Bangladesh Army has been actively involved in a number of United Nations Peace Support Operations (UNPSO) since its formation in the 1970s. Its first deployments came in 1988 when it participated in two operations – UNIIMOG in Iraq and UNTAG in Namibia President HM Ershad initiated these deployments for the first time, starting with the contribution to UNIIMOG in Iraq.

Later as part of the UNIKOM force deployed to Kuwait and Saudi Arabia following the Gulf War, the Bangladesh Army sent a mechanised infantry battalion (approx. 2,193 personnel). Since then, the Bangladesh Army has been involved in up to thirty different UNPKOs in as many as twenty five countries. This has included activities in Angola, Namibia, Cambodia, Somalia, Sudan, Eritrea, Uganda, Rwanda, Bosnia & Herzegovina, Mozambique, former Yugoslavia, Liberia, Haiti, Tajikistan, Western Sahara, Sierra Leone, Kosovo, Georgia, East Timor, Congo, Côte d'Ivoire and Ethiopia.

As a result of its contributions to various UN peacekeeping operations, up to 88 Bangladeshi soldiers have lost their lives (as of February 2009). However, the performance of Bangladesh's contingents has been described as being of the "highest order" and the appointment of several senior Bangladesh military officers as the commander of UN peacekeeping missions and Senior Military Liaison Officers, may be seen as further recognition of the Bangladesh Army's growing esteem in the peacekeeping community. In January 2004, BBC described the Bangladeshi UN Force as "Cream of UN Peacekeepers".

Bangladesh Army has specialised its peacekeeping operation capabilities around the world through participation in numerous peacekeeping and nation building operations. It has created BIPSOT (Bangladesh Institute of Peace Support Operation Training) which specialises in the training of peacekeepers for employment in all types of UNPSO (UN Peace Support Operations). This institute fulfills the requirement of UNDPKO as per U.N. General Assembly resolution which outlines 'the necessity and responsibility of every nation to train their armed forces before any deployment.

=== Women in Bangladesh Army ===
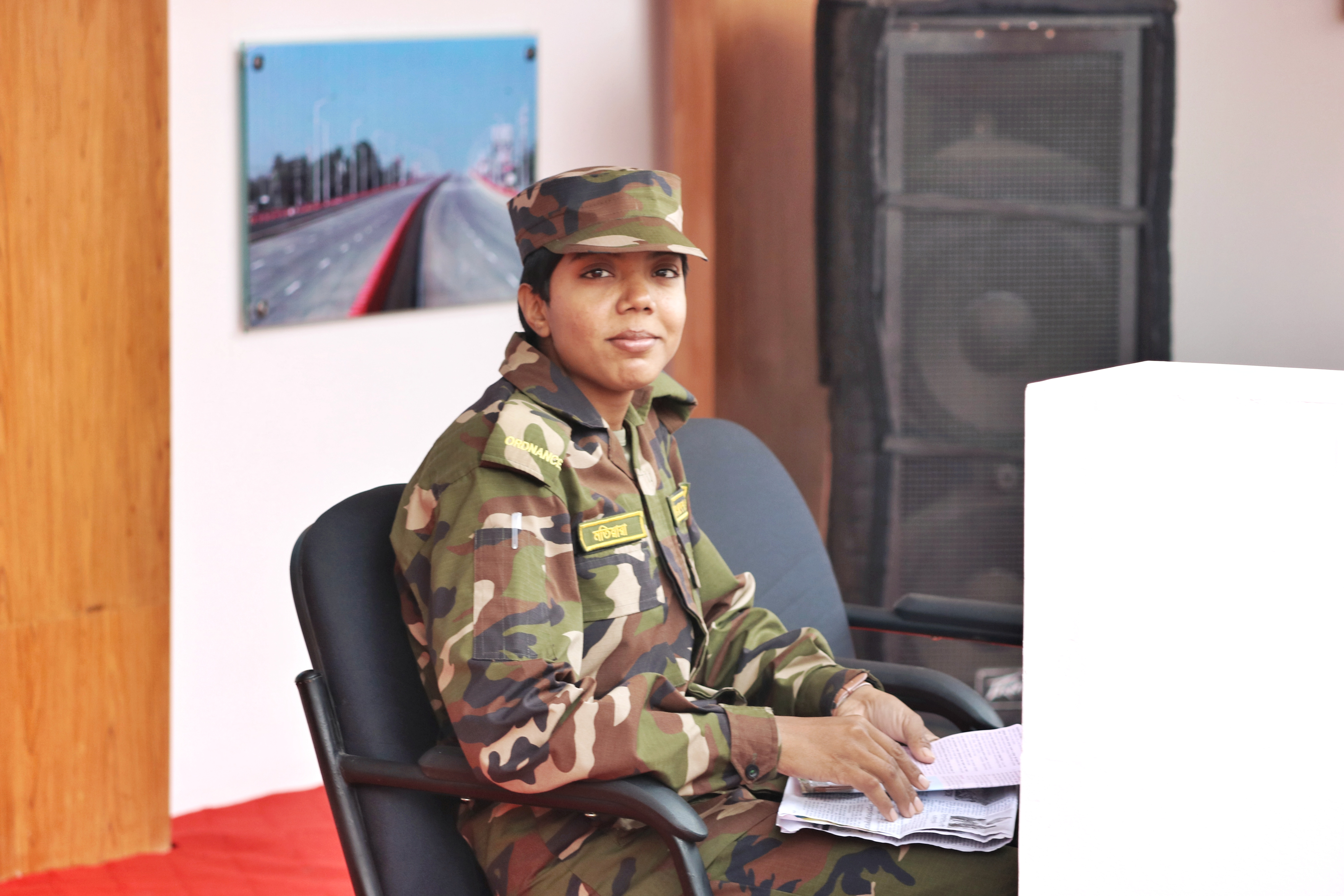
Bangladesh Army's ordnance corps soldier in Comilla, 2018.

Since the early 2000s, Bangladeshi women could join the army in the officer ranks, but were restricted from enlisting as soldiers until 2013. Since the army's inception, women have been able to join the medical corps as doctors. Captain Sitara Begum of army medical corps was a noted woman. On 1 October 2018, the Bangladesh Army got its first female major-general and the person was Susane Giti (commissioned in the 1980s) and she was from the medical corps. Female soldiers can also get United Nations peacekeeping duties like male soldiers. On 25 January 2019, Bangladesh Army appointed four lady battalion commanders for the first time.

=== Controversies ===
In February 2021, an Al Jazeera investigation reported that Bangladeshi military intelligence had secretly procured Israeli-made mobile phone surveillance equipment capable of monitoring multiple targets simultaneously, and that some Bangladeshi military officers received training from Israeli tech experts in Hungary. The Bangladesh Army rejected these claims in an official statement. The chairman of the Commission of Inquiry on Enforced Disappearances alleged that several individual armed forces officers, rather than the military as an institution, were involved in enforced disappearances. In an official statement, the Bangladesh Army assured that it would take action against any personnel proven to be involved in such activities.

On 11 October 2025, the tribunal issued arrest warrants against sixteen officers of the Bangladesh Army on criminal charges of enforced disappearance. In an immediate response, Army Headquarters released a statement disclosing that the indicted officials had been taken into military custody.

== Organisation ==
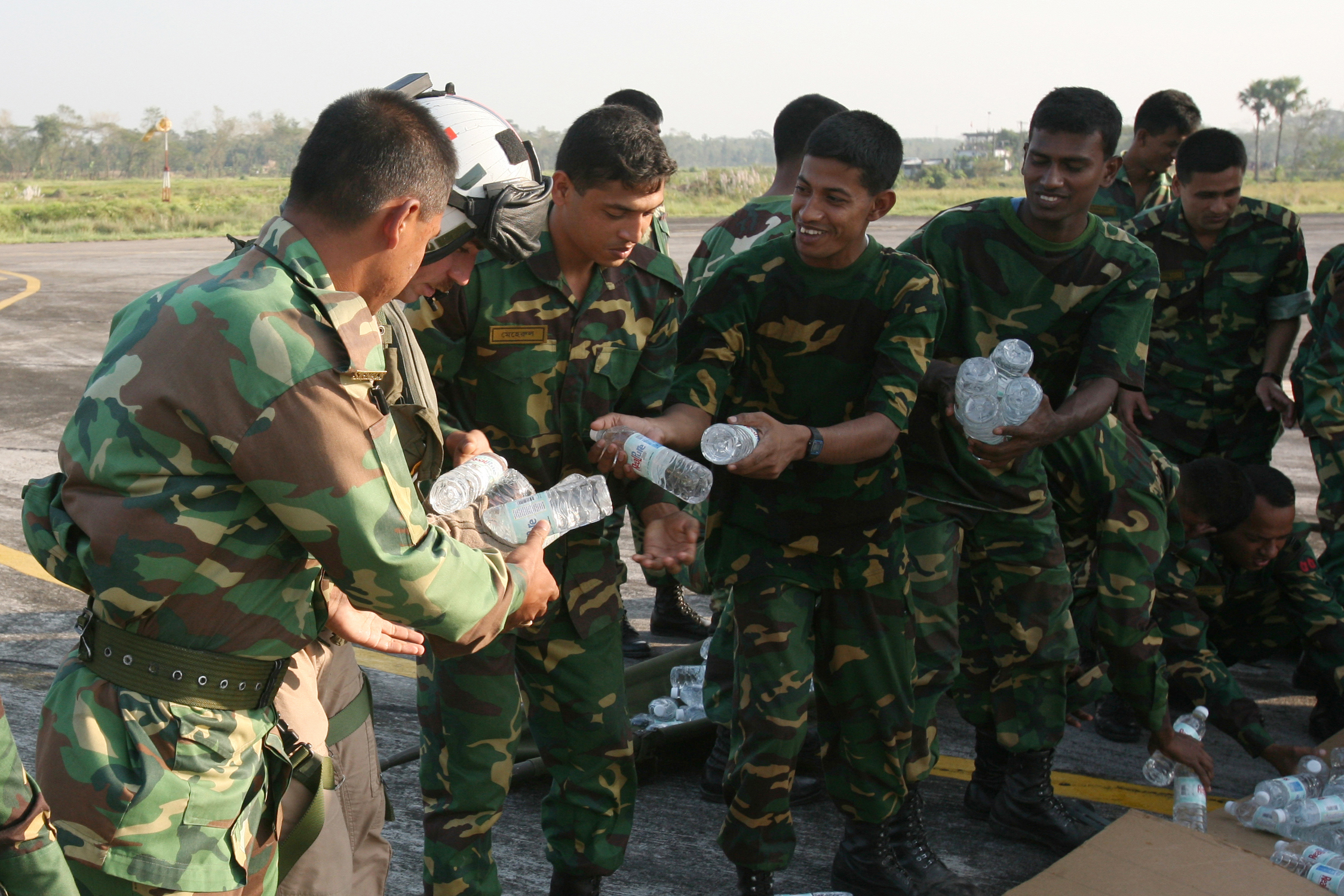
Bangladeshi soldiers unload a shipment of bottled water for cyclone victims.

=== Structure ===
Army Headquarters

The Army Headquarters consists of Chief of Army Staff & his seven Principal Staff Officers & several Directors & Staff Officers who support, advise & assist the Chief of Army Staff for the smooth functioning of the Army. The Branches & Directorates of Army Headquarters are given below-

Chief of Army Staff's Secretariat

Appointment	Star Plate
General Staff Branch	
Quarter Master General's Branch	
Adjutant General's Branch	
Master General of Ordnance's Branch	
Engineer in Chief's Branch	
Military Secretary's Branch	
Judge Advocate General's Branch	

=== Administrative branches ===
Bangladesh Army is divided into the following administrative Corps:

Combat Arms	Combat support	Combat service support
Armoured Corps; Regiment of Artillery; Infantry: East Bengal Regiment (EBR); Bangladesh Infantry Regiment (BIR); Para Commando	Army Aviation; Air defence Corps (AIR DEF); Corps of Engineers; Corps of Signals; Military Intelligence; Army Security Unit (ASU); Field Intelligence Unit (FIU)	Corps of Military Police (CMP); Army Service Corps (ASC); Ordnance Corps; Corps of Electrical and Mechanical Engineers (EME); Army Education Corps (AEC); Army Medical Corps (AMC); Army Dental Corps; Army Corps of Clerks (abbreviated as ACC, made of only NCOs and JCOs); Judge Advocate General's Department (JAG Dept.); Military band; Remounts, Veterinary and Farms Corps (RV & FC); Ministry of Defence Constabulary (MODC); Armed Forces Nursing Services (AFNS)

== Rank structure ==
=== Commissioned Officers ===
Commissioned officers are honored as 'first class gazetted officers' by the Government of Bangladesh.

Rank group	General / flag officers				Senior officers			Junior officers
Bangladesh Army
Bangladesh Army	জেনারেল; Jēnārēl	লেফটেন্যান্ট জেনারেল; Lēphṭēnānṭ jēnārēl	মেজর জেনারেল; Mējar jēnārēl	ব্রিগেডিয়ার জেনারেল; Brigēḍiẏār jēnārēl	কর্নেল; Karnēl	লেফটেন্যান্ট কর্নেল; Lēphṭēnānṭ karnēl	মেজর; Mējar	ক্যাপ্টেন; Kaepṭēn	লেফটেন্যান্ট; Lēphṭēnānṭ	সেকেন্ড লেফটেন্যান্ট; Sēkēnḍ lēphṭēnānṭ

=== Non-Commissioned Officers (NCOs) and Ordinary Soldiers ===
In the Bangladesh Army NCO rank starts after Corporal. Sergeants hold key appointments in companies, batteries (company equivalent of artillery), infantry battalions and artillery regiments, e.g. Company Quartermaster Sergeant (CQMS), Regimental Sergeant Major (RSM), persons holding these appointments have separate rank insignias though these are not actually ranks.

The rank insignia of non-commissioned officers and enlisted personnel.

Rank group	Junior commissioned officers			Non-commissioned officers	Enlisted
Bangladesh Army
Bangladesh Army	মাস্টার ওয়ারেন্ট অফিসার; Māsṭār ōẏārēnṭ ôphisār	সিনিয়র ওয়ারেন্ট অফিসার; Siniẏar ōẏārēnṭ ôphisār	ওয়ারেন্ট অফিসার; Ōẏārēnṭ ôphisār	সার্জেন্ট; Sārjēnṭ	কর্পোর‍্যাল kôrpōrāl	ল্যান্স কর্পোর‍্যাল; Lāns kôrpōrāl	সৈনিক; Śoinik

Sergeant appointments
Regiment Sergeant Major	Quarter Master Sergeant	Sergeant Major	Master Sergeant

== Educational and training institutes ==
=== Schools ===
Army International Islamic Institute

=== Medical Colleges ===
- Armed Forces Institute of Pathology
- Armed Forces Medical Institute
- Armed Forces Medical College
- Army Medical College, Bogra
- Army Medical College, Chittagong
- Army Medical College, Comilla
- Army Medical College, Jessore
- Army Medical College, Rangpur
- Army Nursing College, Comilla
- Army Nursing College, Rangpur

=== Universities ===
- Bangladesh University of Professionals
- Military Institute of Science and Technology
- Bangladesh Army International University of Science & Technology
- Bangladesh Army University of Science & Technology, Khulna
- Bangladesh Army University of Engineering & Technology
- Bangladesh Army University of Science and Technology
- Army Institute of Business Administration, Sylhet
- Army Institute of Business Administration, Savar

=== ARTDOC Installations ===
- Armoured Corps Centre & School
- Army Medical Corps Centre & School
- Army School of Music
- Army School of Physical Training and Sports
- Army Service Corps Centre & School
- Artillery Centre and School
- Bangladesh Infantry Regimental Centre
- Bangladesh Institute of Peace Support Operation Training
- Bangladesh Military Academy
- Corps of Military Police Centre & School
- East Bengal Regimental Centre
- Electrical and Mechanical Engineering Centre and School
- Engineer Centre and School of Military Engineering
- Non-Commissioned Officers Academy
- Ordnance Centre & School
- School of Infantry and Tactics
- School of Military Intelligence
- Signal Training Centre and School
- Army School of Education and Administration
- Army Hill & Jungle Warfare School

== Equipment ==
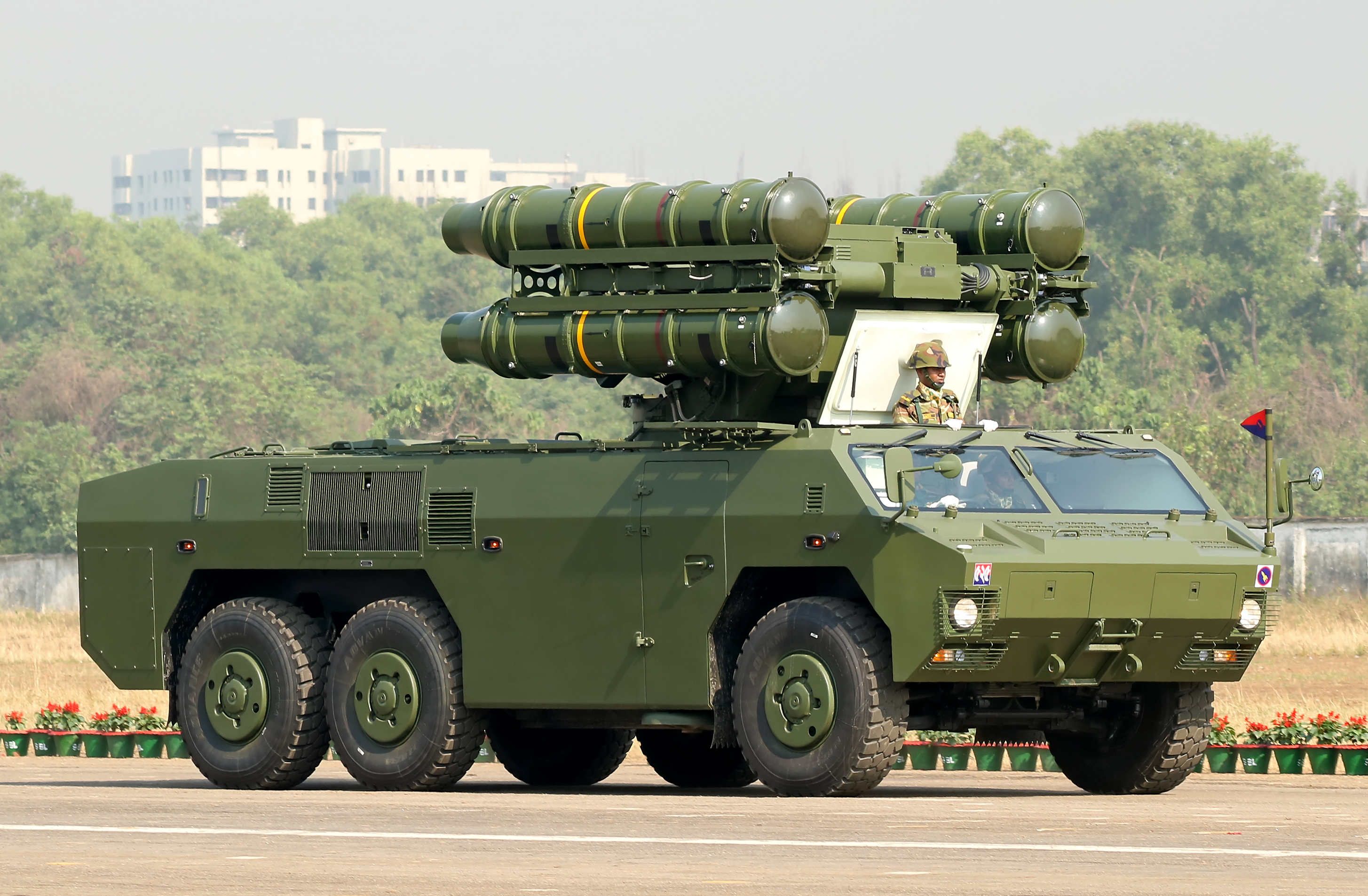
FM-90 Surface to Air Missile of Bangladesh Army

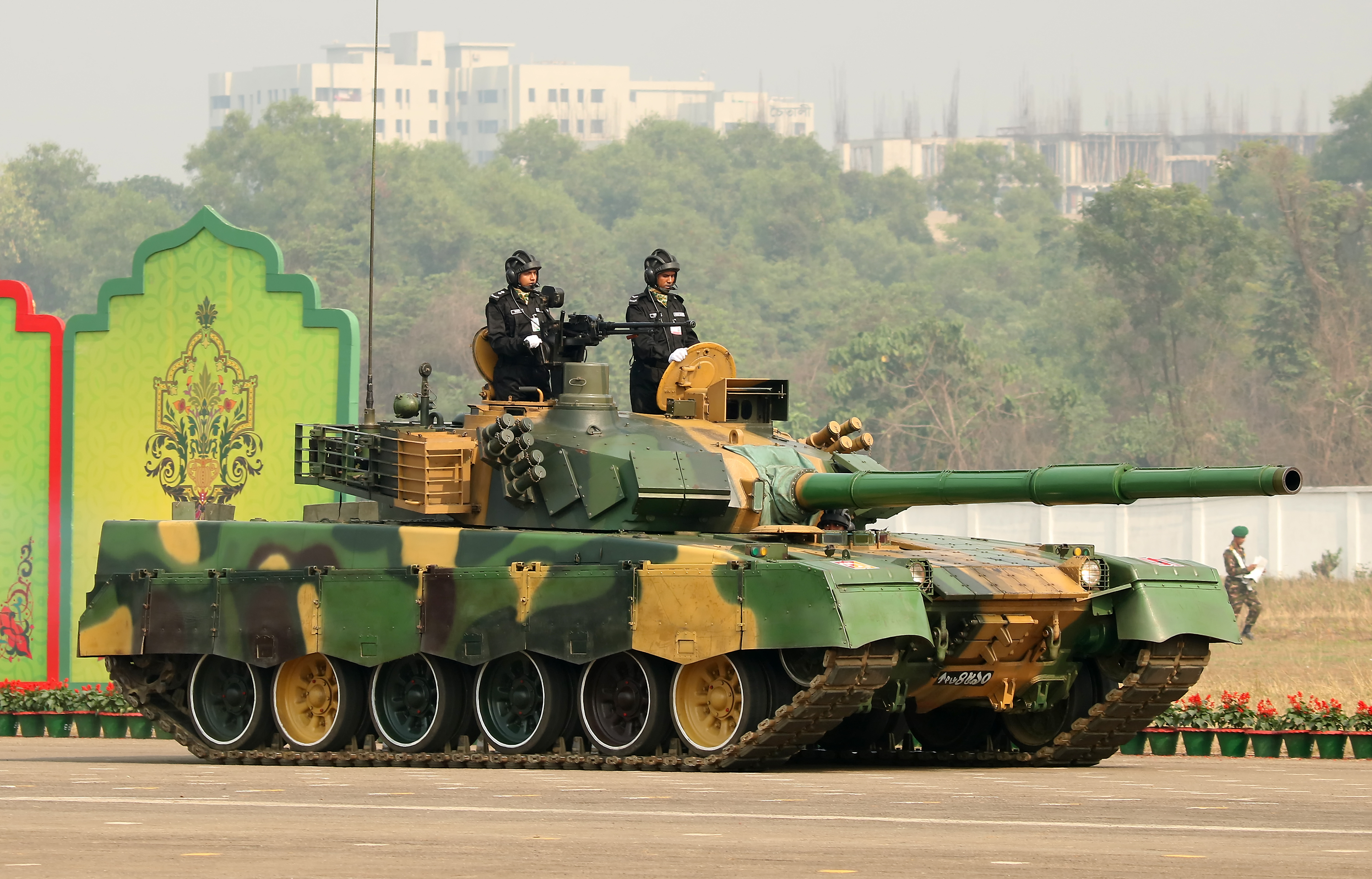
MBT-2000/VT-1A Main Battle Tank of Bangladesh Army

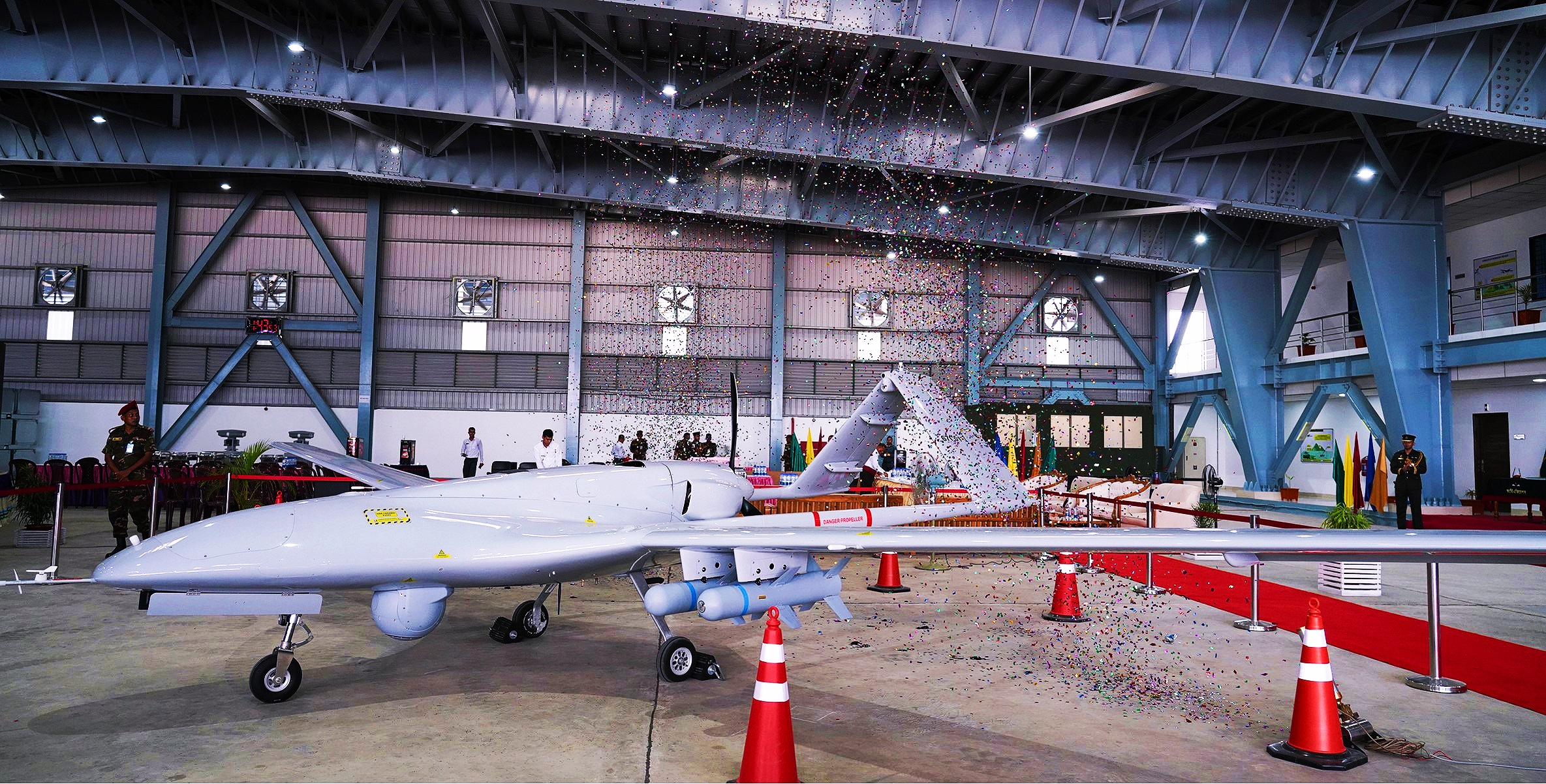
Bangladesh Army Aviation Group Bayraktar TB2 UCAV

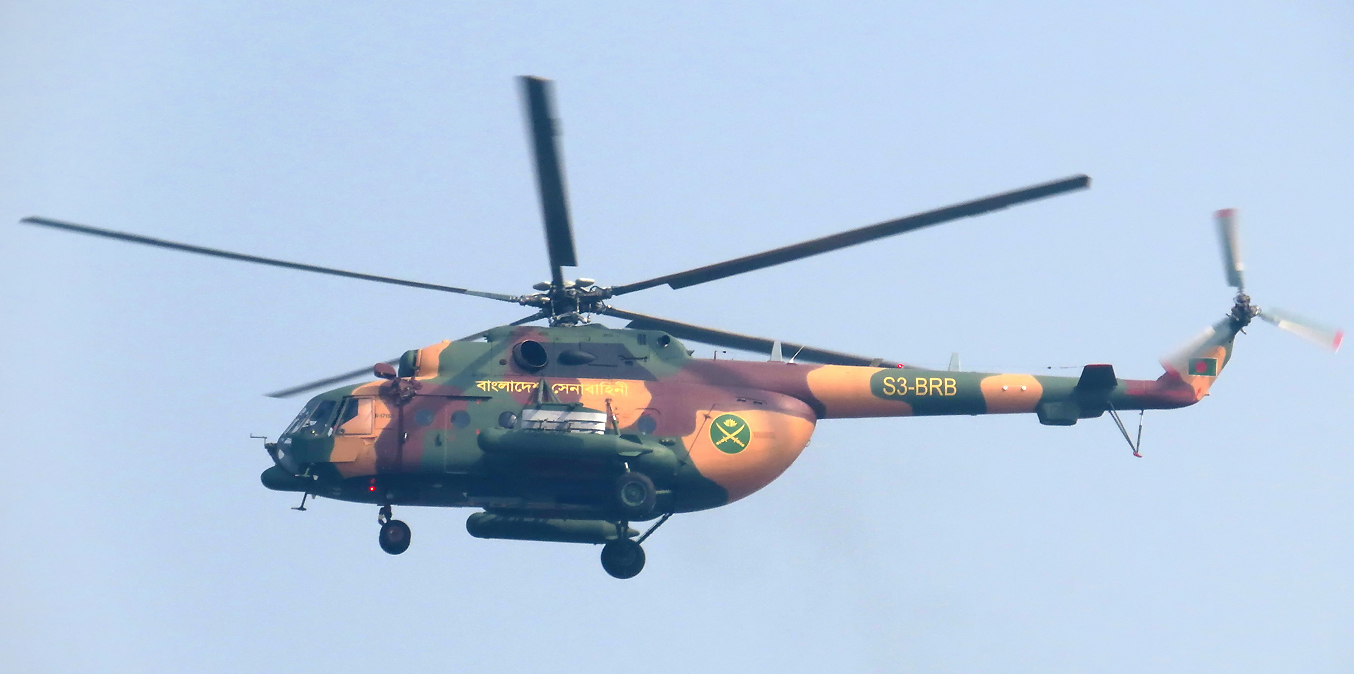
Mi-171Sh Armed Assault Helicopter of Bangladesh Army Aviation Group

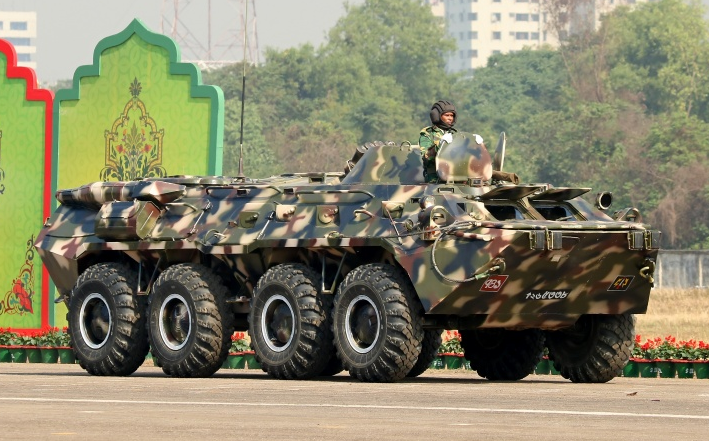
BTR-80 Armoured personnel carrier of Bangladesh Army

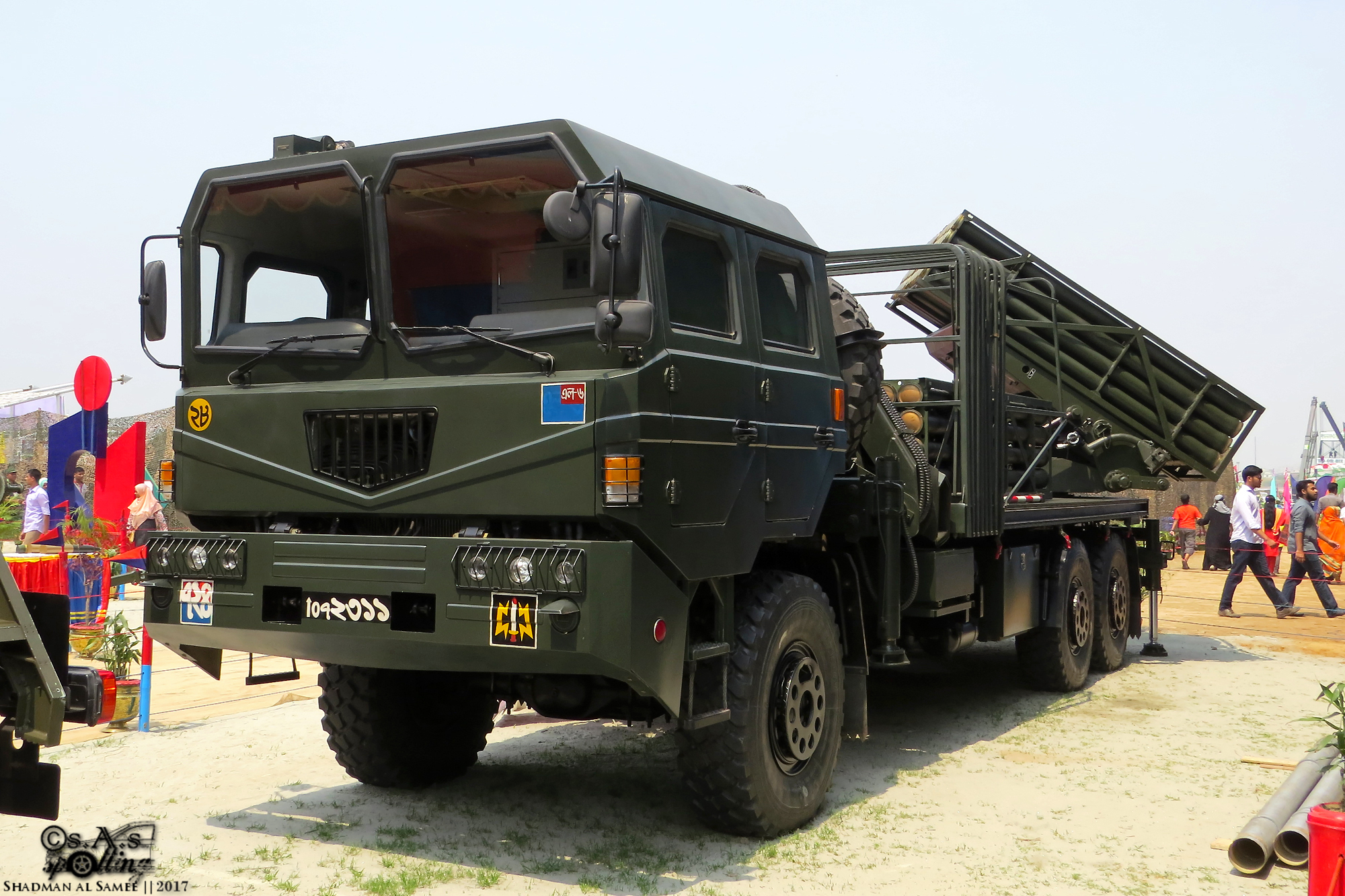
WS-22 Multiple Launch Rocket System of Bangladesh Army

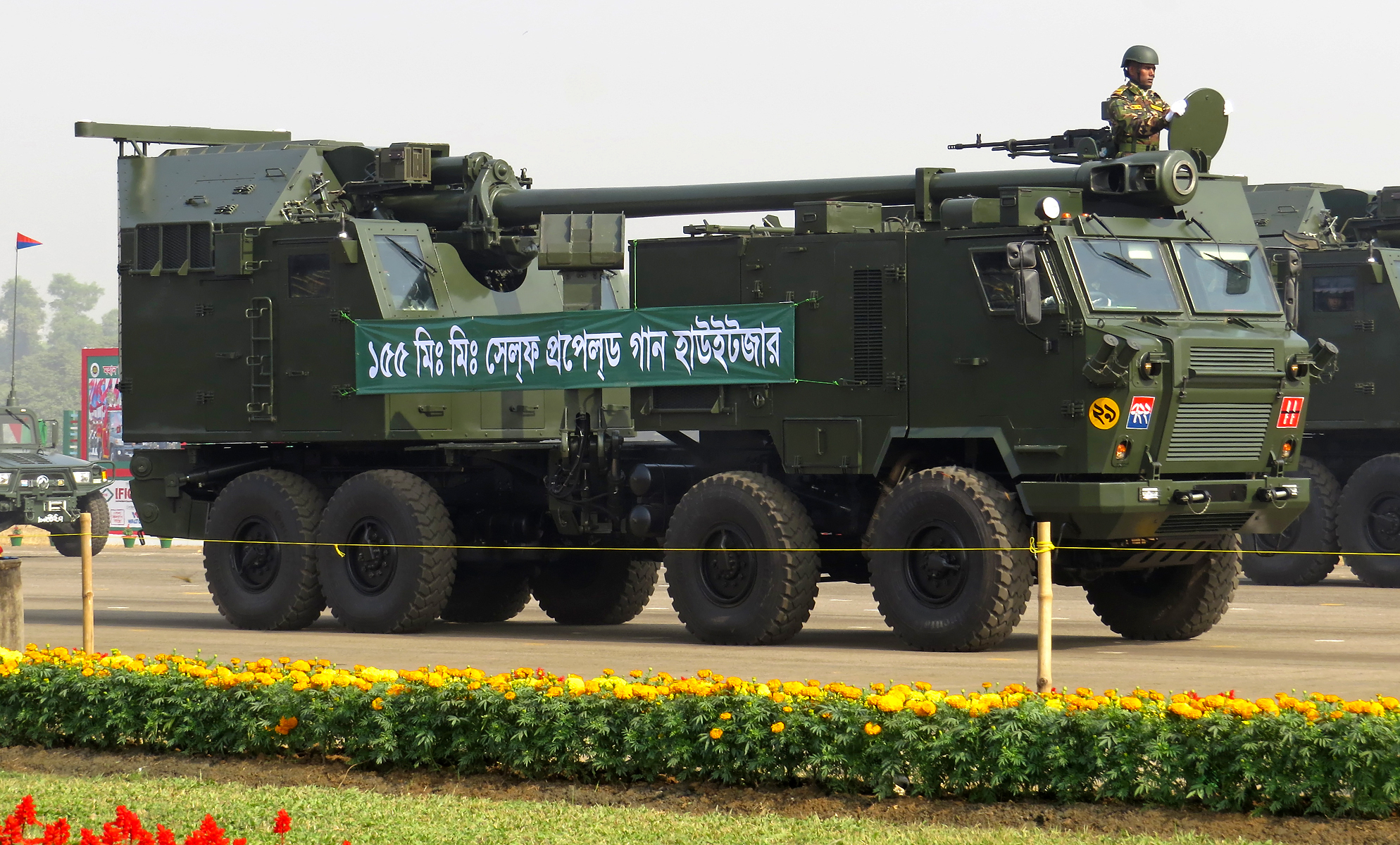
Nora B-52 155mm Self propelled Artillery of Bangladesh Army

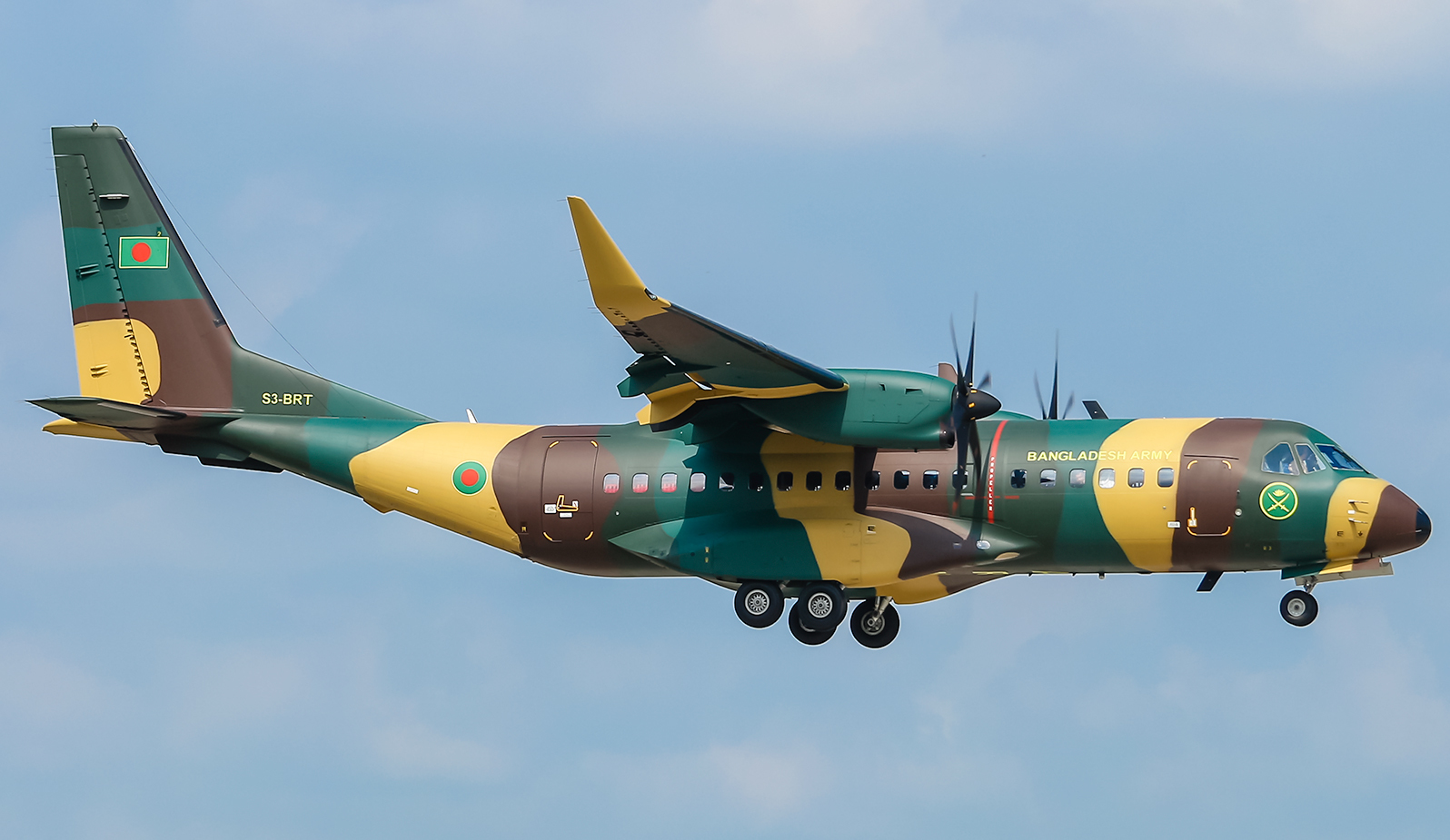
Bangladesh Army Aviation Group EADS CASA CN-295W

== Future modernisation plan ==
Bangladesh has made a long term modernisation plan for its Armed Forces named Forces Goal 2030. As per the plan, Bangladesh Army will be divided into three corps – Central, Eastern and Western. A riverine brigade is being formed at Mithamain of Kishoreganj district. Government has a plan to add 97 new units within 2021. Of them, 19 units will be formed for the Sylhet Cantonment, 22 for the Ramu Cantonment and 56 units for the Sheikh Hasina Cantonment in Lebukhali. A Riverine Engineer Battalion is also going to be formed under a proposed cantonment at Mithamoine in Kishoreganj. Formation of two new tank regiments is under consideration. Process of converting some regular infantry battalions into para infantry battalions and mechanized infantry battalions is also going on.

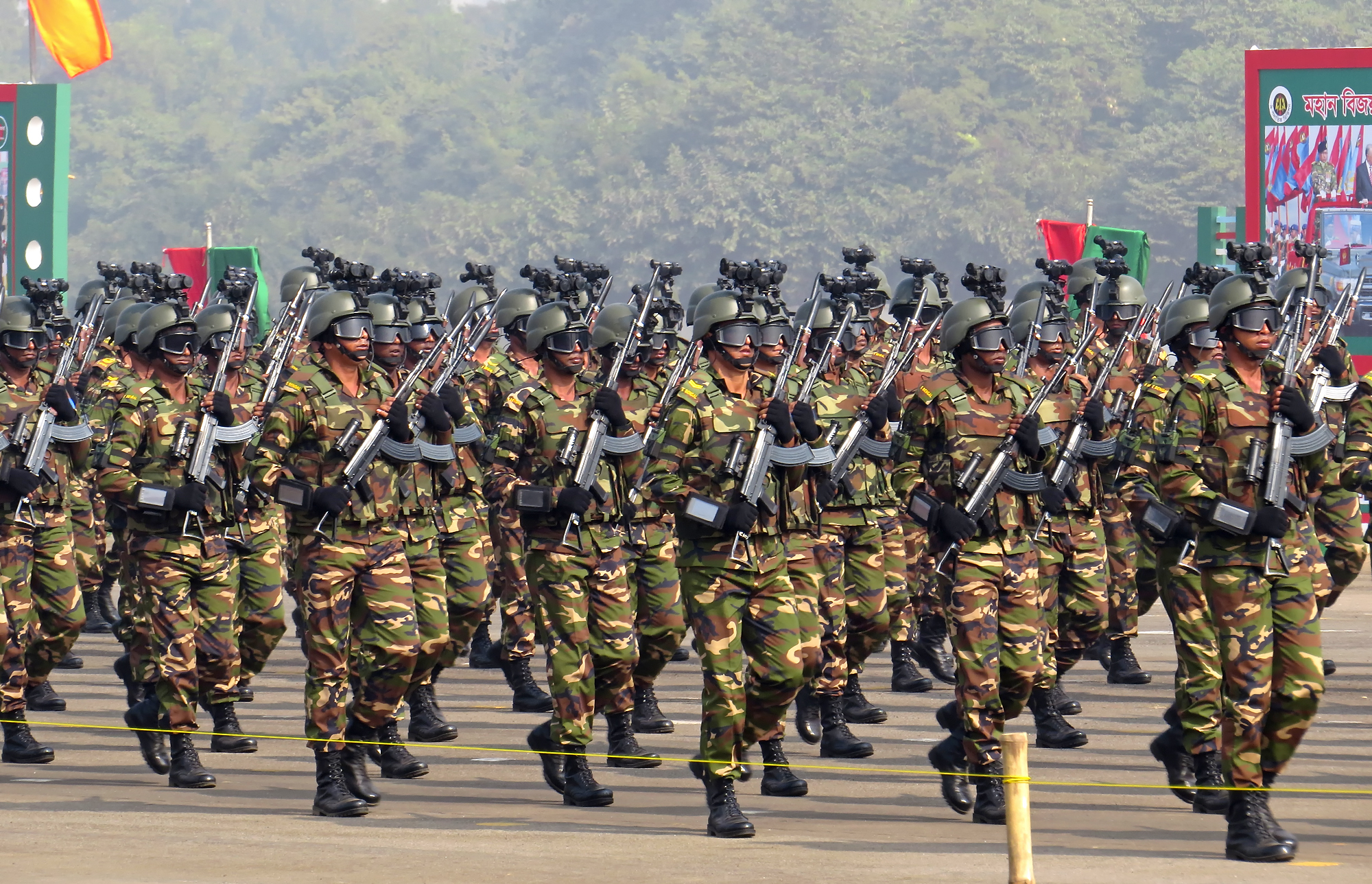
New outfit of Bangladeshi infantry.

Bangladesh Army has started an ambitious modernisation program for its infantry soldiers named Infantry Soldier System. This system includes equipping all of its soldiers with modern equipment like Night Vision Goggles (NVG), Ballistic helmets, Eye protective gear, Bulletproof vest, person to person communicators, palmtop GPS device and BD-08 assault rifles with Collimator sight. In April 2018, a RFI was published for procurement of assault rifles and submachine guns. Evaluation notice for medium range Anti-tank guided missile was also published in April 2017. In March 2018, Bangladesh Army issued a tender for the procurement of 220 anti-tank weapons. The models shortlisted are Russian RPG-7V2 and Chinese Type 69-1.

Evaluation process of 155mm howitzer also started in September 2017. In November 2017, Bangladesh Army started the evaluation process of 122 mm field artillery howitzers. Later on in November 2017, the Bangladesh Army published the tender for the procurement of 105mm towed field artillery systems. In 2019, army signed contract to procure one regiment of T-300 Kasirga Multiple Launch Rocket System (MLRS) system from Turkey.

Bangladesh Army signed contract with China for 44 VT-5 light tanks. The tanks were scheduled to be delivered within 2020.

In March 2018, tender was floated for two local warning radars. The models shortlisted for the tender are Ground Master 400 of Thales, TRML-3D/32 of Hensoldt and KRONOS Land of Leonardo. Army also issued tender for procuring 181 Man-portable air-defense systems. Here, Chinese FN-16, Russian Igla-S and Swedish RBS 70 systems has been shortlisted.

Army Aviation has plan to add one more EADS CASA C-295 transport aircraft to its fleet soon. Besides, process is going on to procure six more Mil Mi-171Sh helicopters. They also have a plan to add attack helicopters to the fleet in the near future.

A tender was floated for the procurement of a command ship in 2017. The vessel will be used as a floating command centre during different operations. Several tenders were floated to procure a total of six Landing craft tanks for the army between 2017 and 2018. Bangladesh army issued tender for procuring two Troops Carrier Vessels (TCV) in January 2018. The vessels will be able to carry 200 personnel.

On 29 June 2021, Government to Government (G2G) defence memorandum of understanding (MoU) signed between Bangladesh and Turkey. According to Dr. İsmail Demir, president of Presidency of Defense Industries, the export agreement of various products of Roketsan has been signed with Bangladesh. Roketsan already delivered TRG-300 Tiger MLRS to the Bangladesh Army in June 2021 from a separate agreement.

In a ceremony on 27 October 2021, the then Prime Minister Sheikh Hasina discussed about the ongoing modernization plan of the Bangladesh Army and its upcoming equipment. She states that one regiment of 105 mm and 155 mm each artillery guns have been procured to increase the artillery power. She added that process of procuring one battery of Oerlikon GDF-009 was going on. Government had signed a contract to procure Very Short Range Air Defence (VSHORAD) systems and two batteries of radar controlled air defence guns. The government also procured six MALE UAV and a tactical missile system for the Bangladesh Army.

== See also ==
- Awards and decorations of the Bangladesh Armed Forces
- Bangladesh Machine Tools Factory
- Bangladesh Ordnance Factories
- List of serving generals of the Bangladesh Army
- Border Guards Bangladesh
- Rapid Action Battalion
- Bangladesh Navy
- Bangladesh Air Force
- Bangladesh Army football team
