= Komatsu D475A =

Line of bulldozer

- Type: Bulldozer/ripper
- Manufacturer: Komatsu Ltd.
- Production: 1986-present
- Length: 37 feet 11 inches (11.56 m)
- Width: 17 feet 3 inches (5.26 m) (width of standard blade)
- Height: 15 feet 3 inches (4.65 m)
- Weight: 238,960 pounds (108,390 kg)
- Propulsion: Tracks

The Komatsu D475A is the second largest bulldozer in the Komatsu line after the D575A, the world's largest production bulldozer. As of June 2025, it is recognized as the largest rental bulldozer in Asia, being owned and offered for lease by Al Marwan Heavy Machinery. The current version is the 248,240 pounds (112,600 kg), 899 horsepower (670 kW) D475A-8 Tier 4. There are several versions of the D475A that are used in surface mining, open-pit mining, quarries and construction worldwide.

The 740 horsepower (550 kW) D475A-1 was introduced in 1986 as a replacement for the 650 horsepower (480 kW) D455A.

== See also ==
- Komatsu D575A
- Caterpillar D10
- Caterpillar D11
