= Caterpillar D8 =

Medium track-type tractor

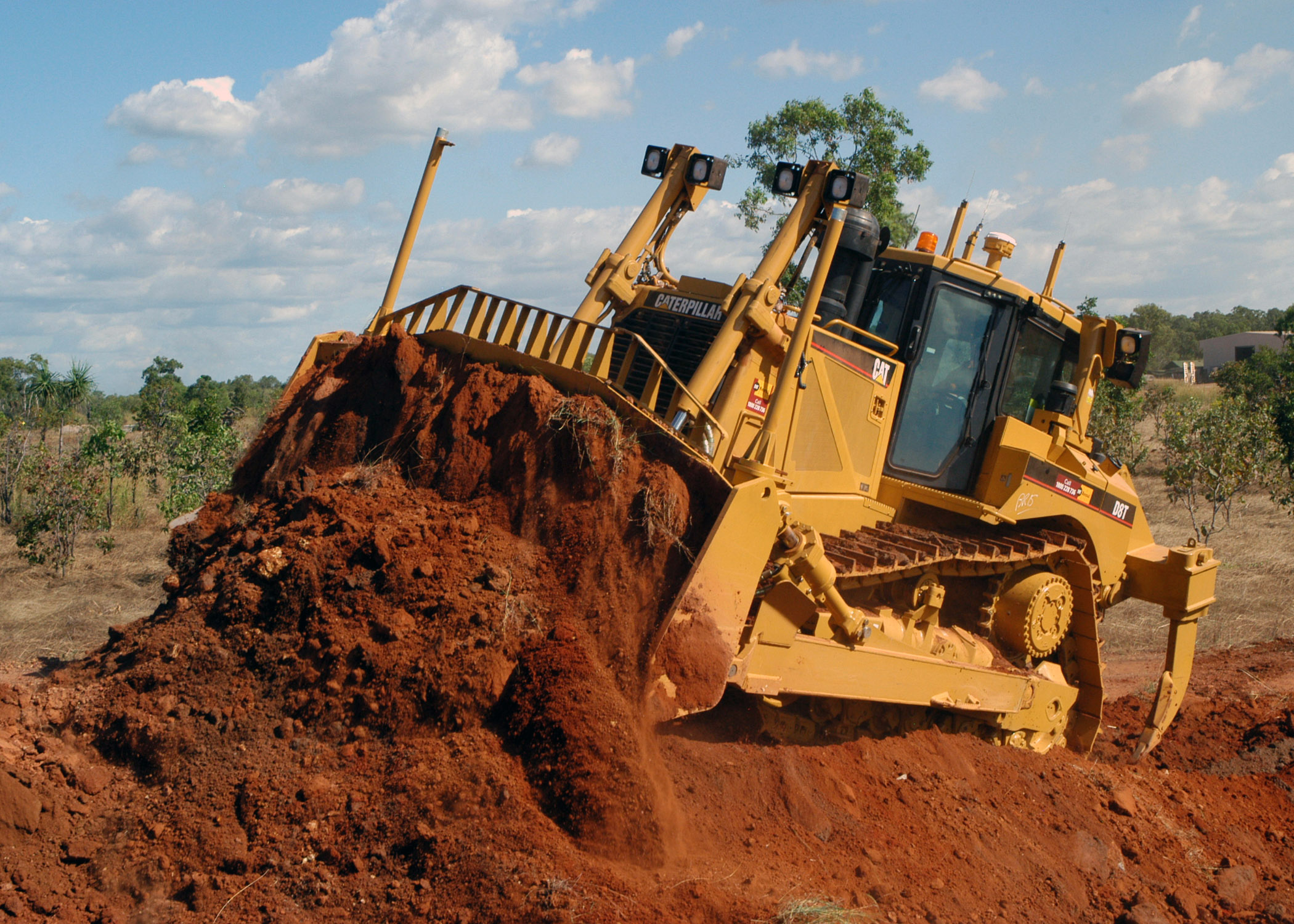
- Caterpillar D8T
- Type: Bulldozer
- Manufacturer: Caterpillar
- Production: 1935–
- Length: 186 in (470 cm)
- Width: 101 in (260 cm)
- Height: 156 in (400 cm)
- Weight: about 80,000 lb (36,000 kg) depending upon year, model and accessories.
- Propulsion: tracks

The Caterpillar D8 is a track-type tractor designed and manufactured by Caterpillar since 1935. Today, the largest in Caterpillar's medium range, it was superseded by the D9 in 1955. Though it comes in many configurations, it is usually sold as a bulldozer equipped with a detachable large blade and a rear ripper attachment.

The model offered in 2025 is a D8 - Tier 4/Stage V, equipped with a 363 hp Cat C15 engine and an operating weight of 87083 lb.

== History ==
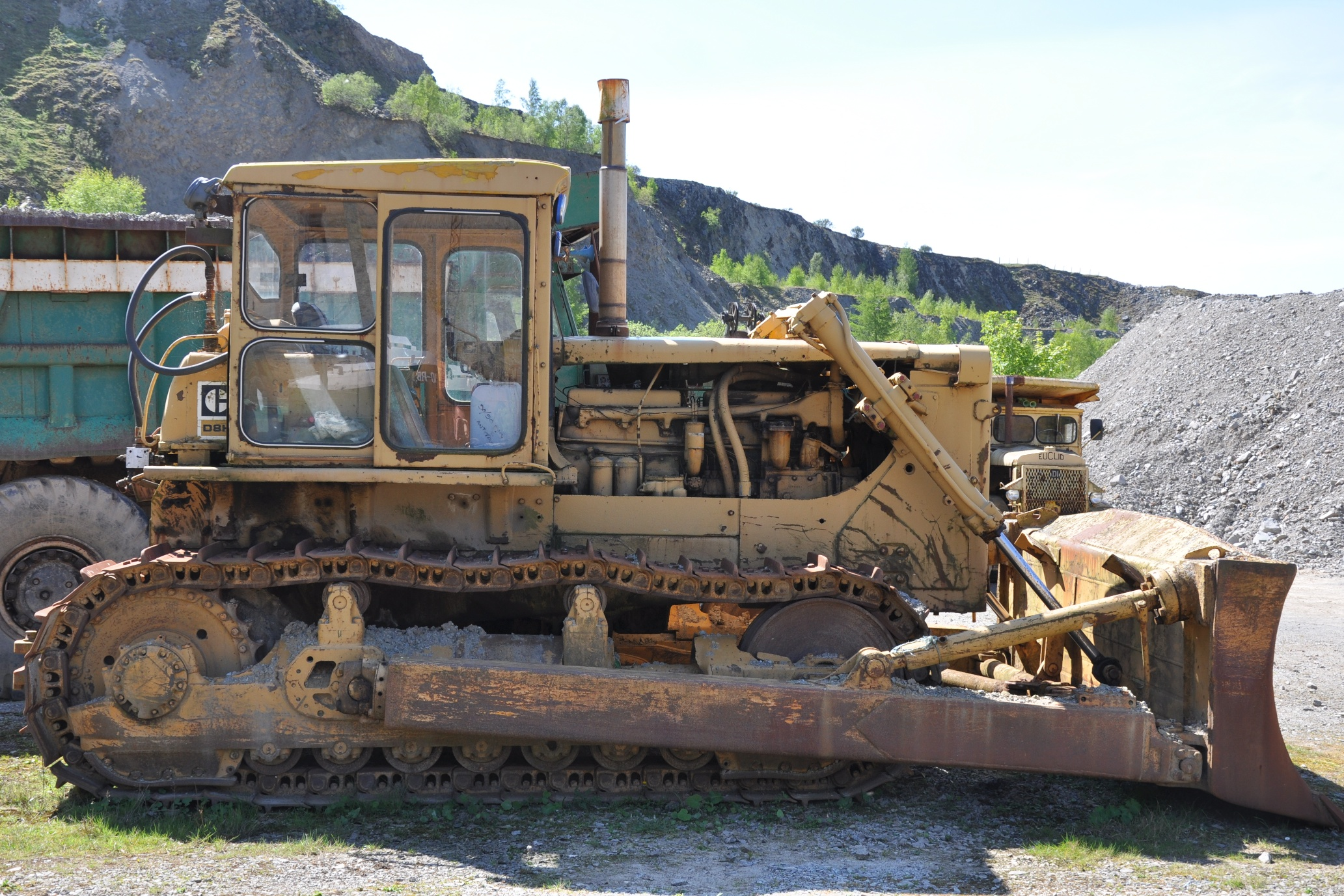
The D8H was introduced in 1958 and produced to 1974; from 1970 on it had 280 hp (210 kW)

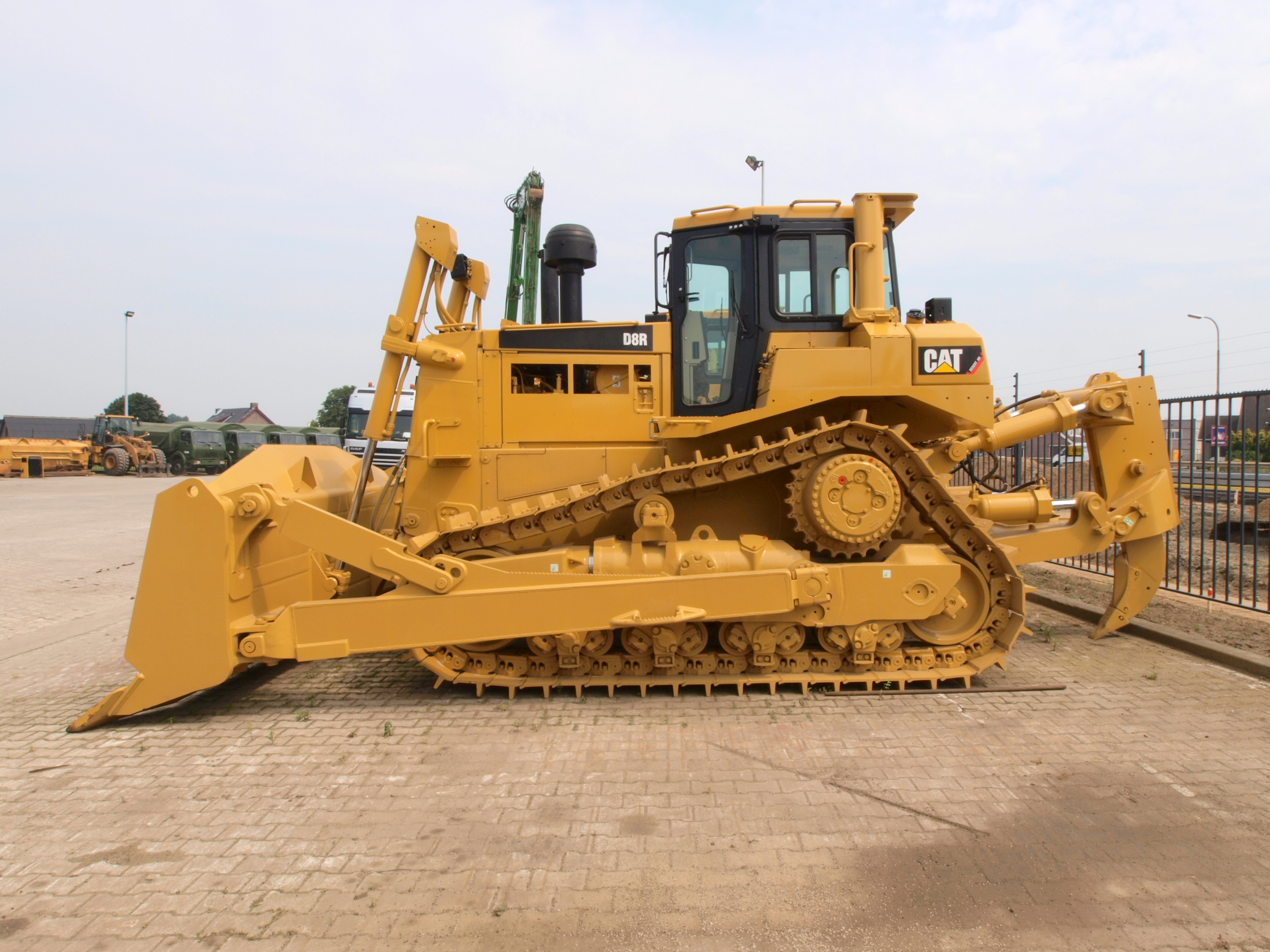
D8 series with Caterpillar's "High Drive" elevated drive sprocket and ripper

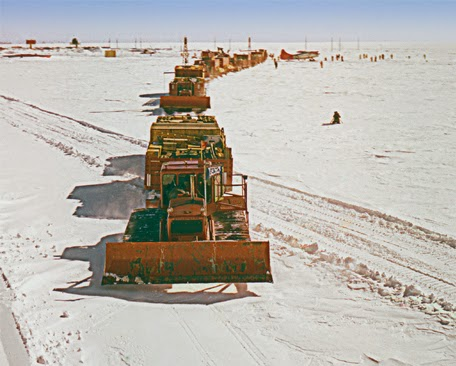
MCB 1 Sled train departing Little America for traverse to Byrd Station with SD8-LGPs

- 1935: RD8 (132 hp [98 kW]) introduced.
- 1937: The "R" prefix dropped, D8 debuts.
- 1940s: D8 2U Series (148 hp [110 kW]) introduced
- 1950: D8 new front-rounded grill that would last until D8K was replaced by D8L in 1982.
- 1953: SD8-LGP produced 1953-59 for military use in Greenland and Antarctica. The "S" indicates the frame was stretched and came with 48" or 54" wide pads with a 15'-16' blade. In 1955 Cat came out with the 286 hp motor for the new D9s and the Seabees put them in their LGPs.
- 1955: 1H Series D8 ends production; 191 hp (142 kW) D8E and D8D introduced with new 1,246-cubic-inch (20,420 cc) displacement (CID) D342 diesel engine. D8D had a torque converter and D8E had a direct drive transmission.
- 1956: D8D replaced by D8G.
- 1956: D8E replaced by D8F.
- 1958: 235 hp (175 kW) D8H introduced.
- 1965: Power increased to 270 hp (200 kW)
- 1970: D8 46a 48a power increased 280 hp (210 kW)
- 1974: 300 hp (220 kW) D8K replaced the D8H.
- 1982: 335 hp (250 kW) D8L replaced D8K. The D8L was the first D8 with the elevated drive sprocket undercarriage.
- 1984: D8L SA (special application) for farming applications premiers. Available with a three point hitch, for mounted implements.
- 1987: D8N (285 hp [213 kW]) with differential steer transmission, the first track-type Caterpillar tractor to have one (the new D8N was smaller than the old D8L size, which was replaced by the new D9N model).
- 1996: 305 hp (227 kW) D8R replaced D8N.
- 2000: D8R Series 2 replaced the D8R.
- 2004: 310 hp (230 kW) D8T ACERT replaced D8R Series 2.

== Blades ==
Several types of bulldozer blade can be used on the front of the tractor:

- Straight ("S-Blade"): A short blade with no lateral curve and no side wings. It can be used for fine grading
- Angle: held by a U shape frame that has three holes on each side, to set the blade to 3 positions: right, center, and left.
- Universal ("U-Blade"): A tall and very curved blade with large side wings to carry more material
- "S-U" combination: A shorter blade with less curvature and smaller side wings

Other blade types include landfill U-Blades, woodchip U-blades, and two-way blades for work inside the holds of ships.

== See also ==
- Heavy equipment
- G-numbers U.S. Army Cats
- Caterpillar D9
- Caterpillar D7
- Bob Semple tank
