= Caterpillar D7 =

Medium bulldozer

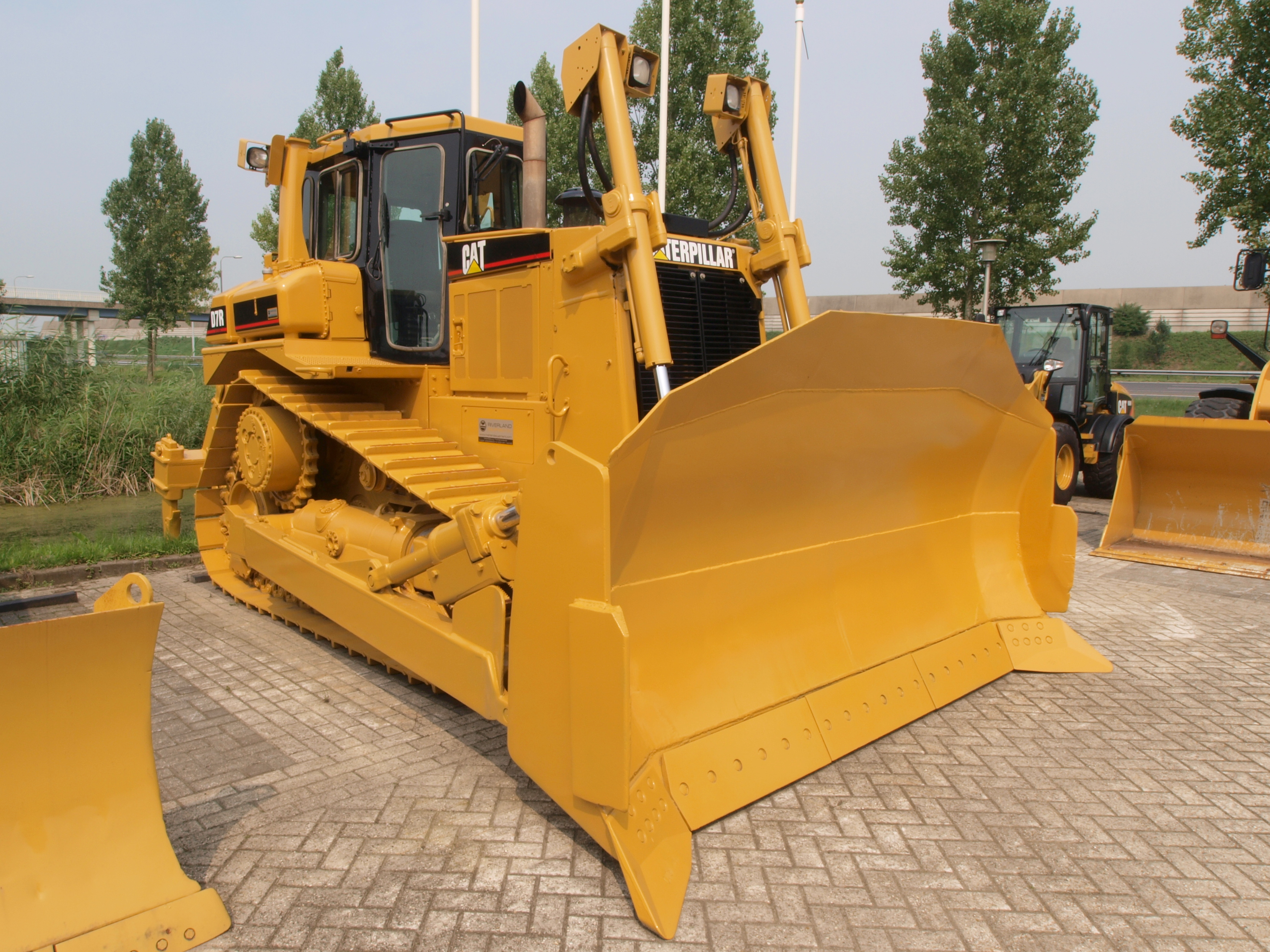
- A Caterpillar D7R
- Type: Bulldozer
- Manufacturer: Caterpillar
- Production: 1938–present
- Length: 160 in (410 cm)
- Width: 97 in (250 cm)
- Height: 96 in (240 cm)
- Weight: 31,870 lb (14,460 kg)
- Propulsion: Tracks

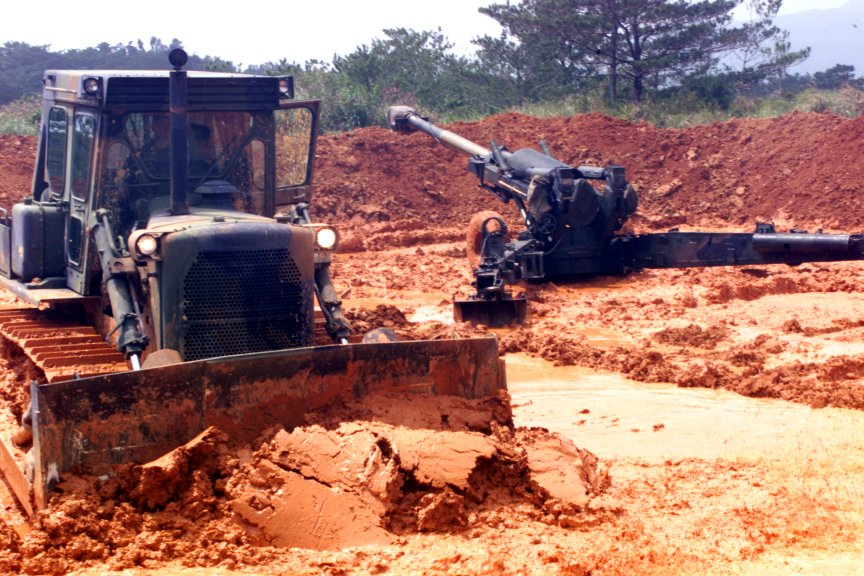
USMC D7G

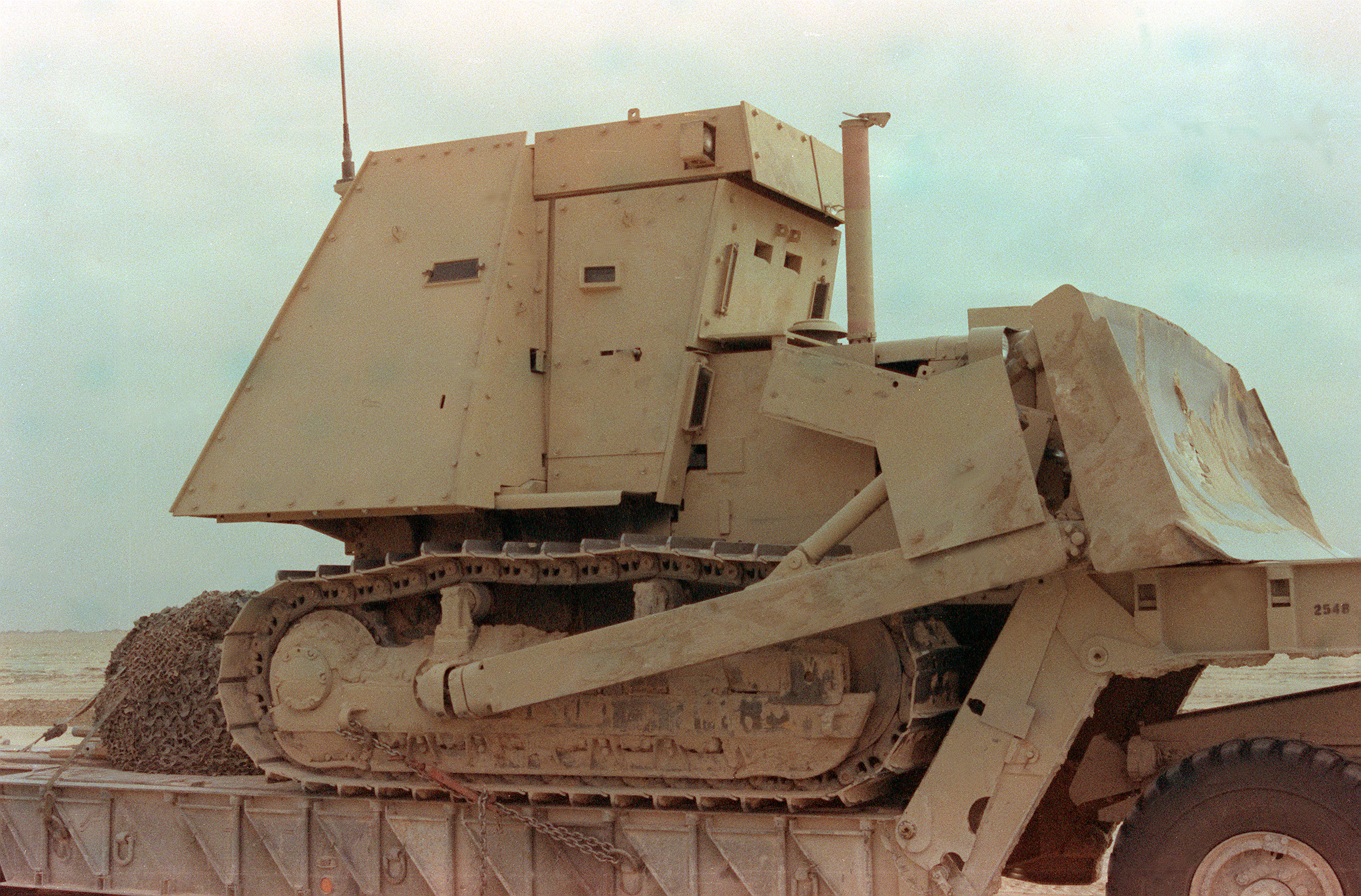
D7 armored bulldozer on flatbed truck for transport

The Caterpillar D7 is a medium track-type tractor manufactured by Caterpillar Inc. and most commonly used as a bulldozer.

The D7 was first manufactured in 1938. A series of improved models were later produced, including the D7C in 1955, the D7D in 1959, the 160 hp (120 kW) D7E in 1961, the 180 hp (130 kW) D7F in 1969 and the 200 hp (150 kW) D7G in 1974. In 1986 the 215 hp (160 kW) D7H was the first D7 equipped with Caterpillar’s elevated drive sprocket undercarriage. The D7R replaced the D7H in 1996, followed by the D7R Series 2. The electric drive D7E entered service in early 2009, returning to a traditional ‘flat-track’ configuration for this iteration only. The high-drive design returned in 2020 with the introduction of the D7 (forgoing a generational letter under Caterpillar’s new naming system).

In March 2008, at Conexpo 2008 held every 3 years in Las Vegas, Caterpillar introduced the D7E. This 235 hp (175 kW) D7E comes with a diesel-electric drive system powered by a 537cid C9.3 diesel engine. The C9.3 powers a generator that turns out electricity that supplies power to a pair of AC drive motors. Compared to the Caterpillar D7R Series II, the D7E was projected to deliver 25 percent more material moved per gallon of fuel, 10 percent greater productivity and 10 percent lower lifetime operating costs.

The D7R Series II at 240 hp (180 kW) power and an operating weight of around 20 tons, is in the middle of Caterpillar's track-type tractors, which range in size from the D3 77 hp (57 kW), 8 short tons (7.3 t), to the D11 935 hp (697 kW), 124 short tons (112 t). It is primarily used to move material short distances or through challenging terrain. The vehicle is powerful, yet small and light (16 to 20 short tons [15 to 18 t]) depending on configuration). This makes it ideal for working on very steep slopes, in forests, and for backfilling pipelines safely without risking damage to the pipe.

An agricultural version without the blade and rippers is commonly used by farmers.

Specially modified D7E's fitted with Rome plows were used to clear forest in the Vietnam War.

The US Army used armored D7G to clear mine fields and unarmored D7G and D7H for earthworks. The armor was developed by the Israel Military Industries (IMI). Later, the US Army developed a remote controlled version of the D7G for mine-clearing applications.

The United States Marine Corps replaced its fleet of D7Gs with John Deere's 850J MCT in 2009.

The Egyptian Army operates an unknown number of armored D7R II.

== Blades ==
The dozer blade on front of the tractor usually comes in 4 varieties:

1. Straight ("S-Blade") which is short and has no lateral curve, no side wings, and can be used for fine grading.
2. Angle: A type of blade, typically only 4' in height, that attaches to the dozers C-frame. The C-frame has 3 holes on each side where the blade will be manually pinned into, thus the angle blade has 3 set positions: right angle, left angle, and centered. Most commonly found in pipeline construction, due to the fact that an experienced operator can move and grade large quantities of material in a relatively short amount of time.
3. Universal ("U-Blade") which is tall and very curved, and has large side wings to carry more material.
4. "S-U" combination blade which is shorter, has less curvature, and smaller side wings.

Various other blade types are used including landfill U-Blades, woodchip U-blades, and two-way blades for work inside the holds of ships.

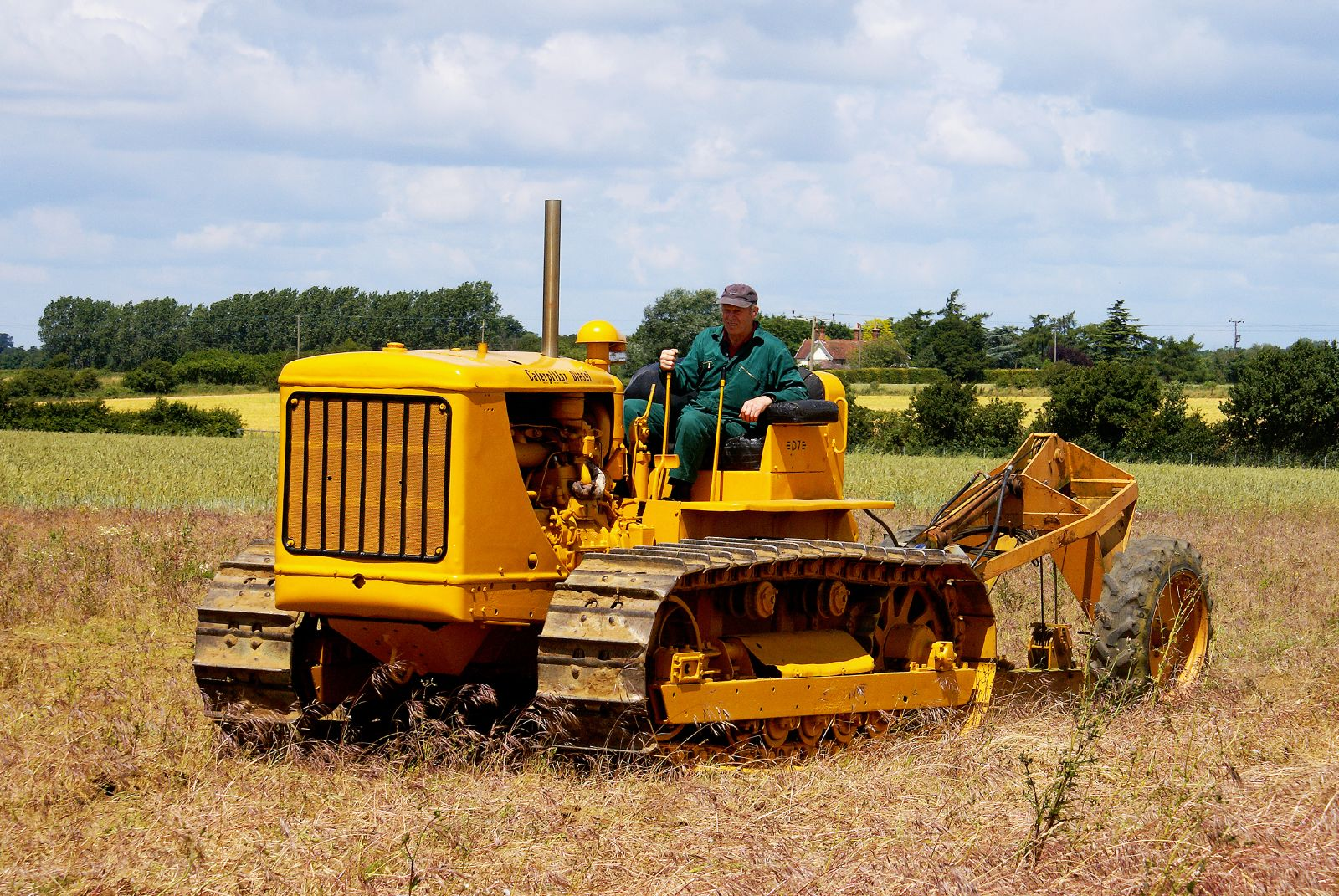
Early D7

== In popular culture ==
A WW-II era Caterpillar D7 is the main antagonist in the novella Killdozer! by Theodore Sturgeon. In the 1974 TV movie Killdozer! a D9 was used instead.

== See also ==
- G-numbers army tractors
- Rome plow
- Caterpillar D8
- Caterpillar D6
