= Komatsu D575A =

1,150 horsepower tractor crawler

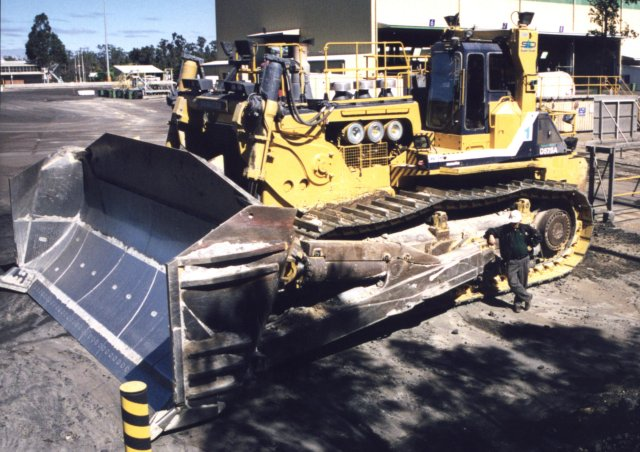
- A Komatsu D575 pictured with a man leaning against the push arm.
- Type: Bulldozer/ripper (D575A-3); Bulldozer (D575A-3 SD)
- Manufacturer: Komatsu Ltd.
- Production: 1989-2012
- Length: 38 feet 5 inches (11.71 m)
- Width: 24 feet 3 inches (7.39 m) (width of standard blade)
- Height: 16 feet 0 inches (4.88 m)
- Weight: D575A-3 - 131,350 kilograms (289,580 lb); D575-A3 SD - 152,600 kilograms (336,400 lb)
- Propulsion: Tracks

The Komatsu D575A is a 1,150 horsepower (860 kW) tractor crawler produced in a 'SR' or Super Ripper bulldozer/ripper configuration, or as a dedicated bulldozer in the form of the 'SD' or Super Dozer. Both models can move 90 cubic yards (69 m^{3}) of material per pass using the standard blade. The D575A-3 SD Super Dozer can move 125 cubic yards (96 m^{3}) of material per pass if equipped with an optional blade. The D575A-3 can dig to a maximum depth of 6 feet 9 inches (2.06 m) using its single-shank ripper.

Commonly referred to as the 'world's largest production bulldozer', the D575A series bulldozers were produced by Komatsu Ltd. in Osaka, Japan. Surface mine operators in the United States, Australia and Japan were the primary users of the D575A, although they were sometimes used in heavy construction applications and quarries as well.

== Development ==
Komatsu first showed a 1,000 horsepower (750 kW) bulldozer prototype, the D555A, to the public at the Conexpo equipment exhibition in Houston, Texas in 1981. Due to economic conditions at the time, development was stalled for much of the 1980s. A successor to the D555A prototype, the D575A-2 SR Super Ripper, began field testing in North America in 1989 by the Cooney Brothers Coal Company in PA where over 1000 hours were logged. Prototype machines are also believed to have been tested at the Harrison Coal and Reclamation Park. Full production began in 1991. The first production machine, delivered in 1992, was initially trialed in PA where the prototypes tested. The first machine was built up by Anderson Equipment Company and then sold to American Asphalt and Paving Company where it initially worked in Las Vegas. The D575A-2 SR Super Ripper was joined by the D575A-2 SD Super Dozer in 1995. The first D575A-2 SD Super Dozer was purchased and placed into service by the Princess Beverly Coal Co. in Cabin Creek, West Virginia. The updated models, the D575A-3 and D575A-3SD Super Dozer were introduced in 2001.

== Series ==
The first series of D575A bulldozers were the D575A-2 machines. These were produced in both SR 'Super Ripper and SD 'Super Dozer' configurations. These models were produced between the years of 1991 and 2000 and 41 machines were built. In 2001 the D575A-3 machines were introduced. These were produced in both SR 'Super Ripper and SD 'Super Dozer' configurations. They wore a new trade dress however most of the upgrades were electronic. Upgrades included features such as the 'Palm Command Control System', smooth and soft operation modes, ECMV controlled transmission, ECMV controlled transmission steering clutches/brakes, preset travel speed selection function and auto-shift down function. Upgrades made within the cab also included a new suspension seat and upgraded displays and monitoring systems. These models were produced between the years of 2001 and 2007 and 11 machines were built. In 2012, a custom order was placed by Alcoa in Australia and a final machine was built taking the total A3 build number to 12.

== Production ==
All Komatsu bulldozers are identified by the letter D (for Dozer) followed by the model number (575A). Following that, the series is represented (-2 or -3) and finally the configuration (SR or SD). Each machine had its model number and serial number stamped onto a personal identification plate that was located inside the cab. Serial Numbers 10001 – 10043 were A2 machines. Serial numbers ceased at 10043 and started back up at 10101 when the A3 series machine production begun. Serial Numbers 10101 – 10112 were A3 machines. Serial numbers 10004 and 10013 were not produced due to the bad luck associated with both numbers (#4 and #13) in Japanese culture.

Production numbers were as follows:

D575A-2SR = 17 machines

D575A-2SD = 24 machines

D575A-3SR = 2 machines

D575A-3SD = 10 machines

Total -2 Machines = 41 machines

Total -3 Machines = 12 machines

Total SR machines = 19 machines

Total SD machines = 34 machines

Overall total = 53 machines

== Specifications ==
A 12-cylinder, four-stroke, water-cooled, direct injected, turbocharged, intercooled, 1,150 horsepower (860 kW) Komatsu SA12V170E diesel engine powers the D575A-3.

The D575A-3SD measures 16 feet 0 inches (4.88 m) tall, 38 feet 5 inches (11.71 m) long has a ground clearance of 2 feet 5 inches (0.74 m).

The D575A-3SD features a Super Dozer blade designed to dump, dig or carry that measures 11 feet 11 inches (3.63 m) high and 24 feet 3 inches (7.39 m) wide. It has a capacity of 90yd3 (69m3).

The D575A-3 could be optioned with a Semi-U blade or a U-dozer blade. Either could be ordered with single or dual tilt cylinders. The Semi-U has a capacity of 44.5y3 (34m3) while the U-dozer blade has a capacity of 58.8yd3 (45m3).

The D575A-3SD has a ground contact area of 101.55 square feet (9.434 m^{2}) and exerts an average ground pressure of 23 pounds per square inch (160 kPa).

The D575A-3 Super Ripper weighs 289,570 lb (131,350kg). The D575A-3SD weighs 336,420 lb (152,600kg).

== Applications ==
From new, North American companies purchased 31 machines, 14 machines were sold to Australia and 8 machines were sold within Japan. Within the United States, the D575A bulldozers were primarily used in surface mines in West Virginia, mostly operating for Alpha Natural Resources and Horizon / Princess Beverly Coal on mines in Appalachia. At one stage, 17 D575A's were in service in the West Virginia Coal Fields. In Australia, machines were used in surface mines and on some major road projects across the country. The majority of the machines sold within Australia were Super Ripper. Alcoa, located in Western Australia purchased 5 machines and used them to rip large areas where they couldn't blast due to the proximity to residential housing and they were often operated by Remote Control. 8 machines were sold within Japan working in quarries with many being owned by Fujisaco Co. LTD. Two second hand D575A-2SD machines (ex Australia) were sold to Kaipara Limited (New Zealand) and with the help of Komatsu Australia, had rippers retrofitted to the machines. The machines were operated out of Stockton coal mine in the West Coast region of New Zealand's South Island. These machines were used to rip above areas where abandoned mine shafts existed and were also often operated via Remote Control.

== Models ==
=== D555A (Prototype) ===
The D555A prototype was first shown to the public in 1981 at the Conexpo equipment exhibition in Houston, TX. Due to economic conditions at the time, development was stalled for much of the 1980s. A successor to the D555A, the D575A-2 SR Super Ripper began field testing in 1989 and was the first model to enter production beginning in 1991.

=== D575A-2 SR Super Ripper dozer/ripper (Discontinued) ===
The D575A-2 SR Super Ripper was the first production version of the D575A, going into production beginning in 1991. It produced 1,050hp (784kw). The D575A-2 SR Super Ripper included a single shank ripper capable of digging to a maximum depth of 6 feet 9 inches (2.06 m). The D575A-2 SR Super Ripper was superseded by the D575A-3.

=== D575A-2 SD Super Dozer dedicated dozer (Discontinued) ===
The D575A-2 SD Super Dozer was the second version of the D575A, going into production alongside the D575A-2 SR Super Ripper beginning in 1995. The D575A-2 SD Super Dozer is an 1,150 horsepower (860 kW), 143,300 kilograms (315,900 lb) dedicated dozer with no ripper. The D575A-2 SD Super Dozer was superseded by the D575A-3 SD Super Dozer.

=== D575A-3 SR dozer/ripper (Discontinued) ===
The D575A-3 is an 1,150 horsepower (860 kW) dozer/ripper weighing 131,350 kilograms (289,580 lb) and capable of moving up to 90 cubic yards (69 m^{3}) of material per pass. The single shank ripper has a maximum digging depth of 6 feet 9 inches (2.06 m).

=== D575A-3 SD Super Dozer dedicated dozer (Discontinued) ===
Introduced in 2001 as the successor to the D575A-2 SD Super Dozer, the D575A-3 SD Super Dozer is a dedicated dozer with no ripper weighing 152,600 kilograms (336,400 lb). Equipped with a standard blade, the D575A-3 SD is capable of moving up to 90 cubic yards (69 m^{3}) of material per pass, however, when equipped with an optional blade, the D575A-3 SD is capable of moving up to 125 cubic yards (96 m^{3}) per pass. The D575A-3 SD includes major changes to the frame, powertrain, undercarriage, and blade, making it substantially different from the D575A-3.

In comparison to its predecessor, the D575A-3 SD includes a significantly re-designed operator cabin and powertrain electronic control system to increase productivity and a number of durability improvements including reinforced undercarriage roller guards, simpler hydraulic plumbing and longer-life hoses, seals, wiring harnesses, and connectors.

== Transportation ==
Due to its immense size, the D575A must be broken down into component form when it is moved from one job site to another. Moving all the components requires six to eight truck loads depending on local laws.

== Reasons for discontinuation ==
Manufacturing costs were high as the price of the machine had to be set by the market. Eg: Production was twice that of the D455A and therefore it should cost twice as much as the D455A. In reality however, production costs were much higher than twice that of the D455A. Komatsu were happy to absorb this cost as the dozer sales across the entire product line were good so the D575A ran at a loss.

In the early 90's, when the D575A was introduced to the market, it was also competing (although actually in a separate weight, power and size class) against the CAT D11N, a machine that was already well established in the industry. At the time, the D475A only held an approximately 35-40% market share when compared to the D11N/R, so adding another competitor to their line also, in a way, divided sales.

Early machines suffered from catastrophic failures, including some burn outs, due to powerline and / or engine issues. Following an issue like this, Komatsu dispatched specialists to the customer’s job site to find out the reason and repair the machine at Komatsu’s cost. Komatsu also revised the technical drawings and changes that were then reflected in the next production machine. At times, new parts would have to be cast and replaced which could take weeks to deliver to job sites on the other side of the world.

As the orders slowed for the 575, orders for the 375s and 475 picked up, and it was the same staff on the assembly lines who built all three lines, so every time a 575 order did come in, they had to take men off other lines to build them. Therefore, these near custom orders for the D575s were also slowing production of their better selling machines.

Around 2000, the price of coal decreased and therefore so did available money to purchase equipment. The launch of the updated A3 model of the D575A in 2001 was unfortunately timed.

Between 2001 and 2007, only 11 machines were ordered and built. The 2008 financial crisis led to a decrease in orders. Between 2007 and 2011, no orders were recorded at all but Komatsu retained the drawings, parts, jigs and manufacturing moulds as it was still seen as their flagship model (their 'star of hope') and they still had hope that one day the orders would return.

After many years without orders, the manufacturing plant in Osaka asked management what to do with the parts jigs and moulds that were taking up space. Many had become rusty and didn't work as well as they should have. The decision was made to discontinue the model and retire all manufacturing resources.

Another consideration at the time was the cost to achieve the engine emissions required in the near future. It was quickly realized that the development costs to meet emissions standards on a global scale was a major cost consideration. The market was declining thus the costs would be assigned to fewer units to share the load of the cost. If the market had stabilized in the early 2000's, or even grown, Komatsu may have continued to develop the D575A.

== See also ==
- Komatsu D475A
- Caterpillar D11
