= Komatsu PC200-8 Hybrid =

Model of hydraulic excavator

The Komatsu PC200-8 Hybrid is a hydraulic excavator manufactured by Komatsu Limited. It is the world's first hybrid (electro-hydraulic) powered construction equipment. At the time of its launch it was found to consume 25% less fuel than comparable non-hybrid excavators and up to 40% less fuel while carrying out certain functions.

It was released on 1 June 2008. It has been made available in Japan, China and North America.

== Mechanism ==
The Komatsu PC200-8 Hybrid uses the Komatsu Hybrid System. The system uses an ultracapacitor bank to store energy generated by the swing movement of the upper structure of the excavator. An electric slewing motor/generator produces electrical power (as a generator) when braking the upper structure, and stores the current in the ultracapacitor bank. The excavator then utilizes electricity discharged from the ultracapacitor bank to power a motor to assist the engine and feed the motor/generator for swing acceleration.

== Performance ==
At the time of its release, recorded fuel consumption was found to be reduced by as much as 41% when compared to comparable non-hybrid machines. Construction Equipment magazine compared the HB215LC-1 hybrid excavator with a conventional model.

== See also ==
- Amphibious excavator
- Long reach excavator
