= Caterpillar D11 =

Large bulldozer

Caterpillar D11T
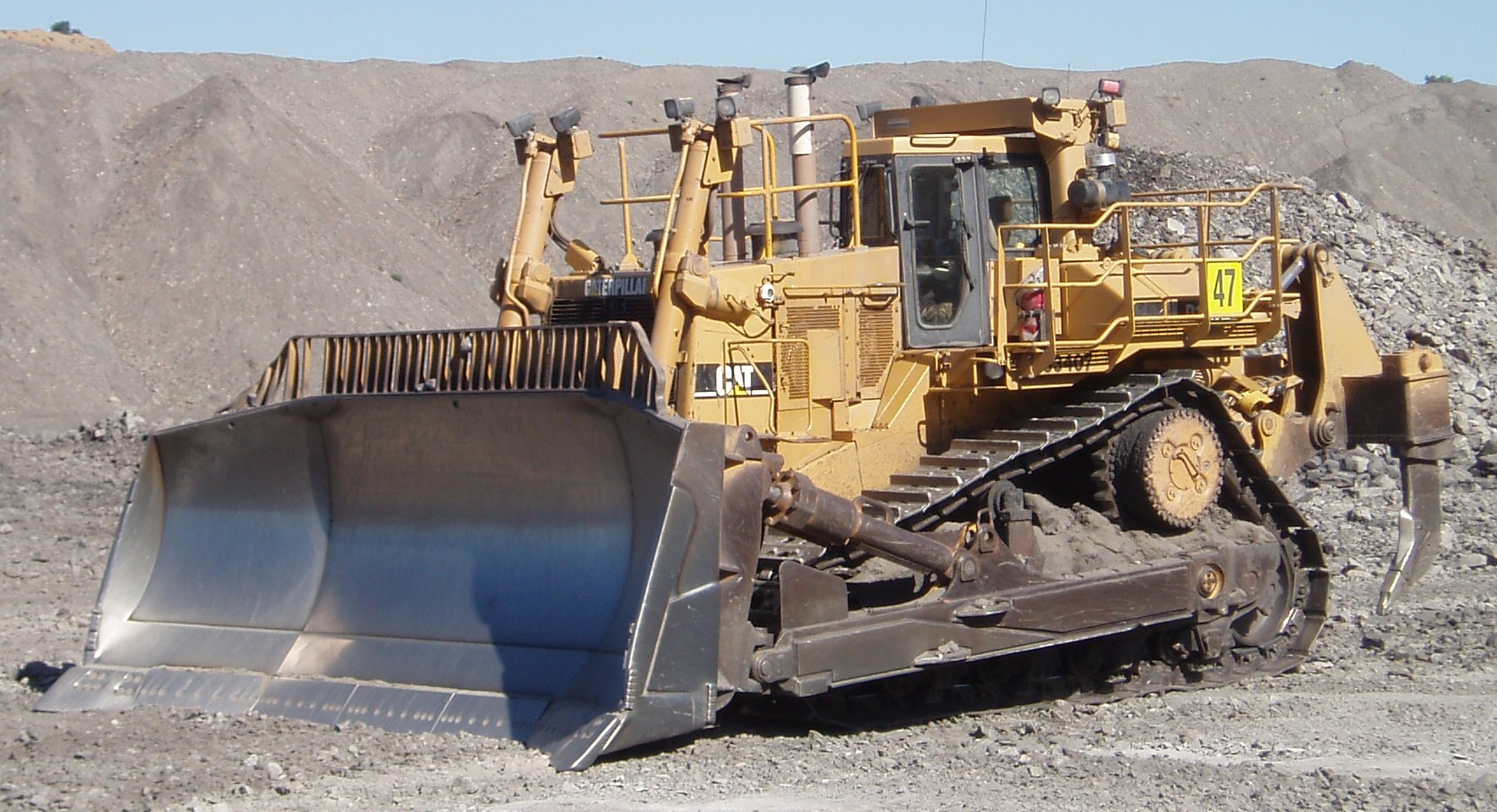
- Type: Heavy bulldozer
- Manufacturer: Caterpillar
- Length: 35.8 feet (10.9 m)
- Width: 10.4 feet (3.2 m) (track); 22 feet (6.7 m) (blade)
- Height: 14.9 feet (4.5 m) (top of stack)
- Weight: 248,500 pounds (112,700 kg) (operating weight)
- Propulsion: Caterpillar tracks
- Engine model: CAT C32 ACERT
- Gross power: 936 horsepower (698 kilowatts)
- Flywheel power: 850 hp (630 kW)
- Blade capacity: 43.6 m^{3} (57.0 yd^{3})

The Caterpillar D11T is a large bulldozer introduced by Caterpillar Inc. in 1986 to replace its D10. Weighing 248,500 pounds (112,700 kg), it is Caterpillar's largest and most powerful bulldozer. Mainly used in the mining industry, it is also employed to push-load scrapers, and rip rock overburden. D11s are manufactured in East Peoria, Illinois.

== History ==
=== D11N ===
The D11N was introduced in February 1986 to replace the D10. The D11N had some major improvements over the D10: it includes a bigger track and blade, and a longer track by 21 inches (0.53 m). The U blade was just under 21 feet (6.4 m) wide and 7 feet (2.1 m) high. This increased the blade capacity to 45 yd^{3} (34 m^{3}). The D11N's weight was 204,517 pounds (92,767 kg). It was powered by a 770 horsepower (570 kW), 2,105 cu in (34.49 L) 3508 V-8 diesel engine. The D11N's improvements made it over 10 percent more productive than the D10. In 1987 a hydraulically powered impact ripper was added to the D11N which raised the weight up to 225,950 lb (102,490 kg). This would become known as the D11N Impact Ripper.

=== D11R & D11R Carrydozer ===
The D11R and D11R Carrydozer were introduced in Las Vegas, Nevada, at MINExpo International in 1996. Both were 770 hp (570 kW) and that would be increased to 850 hp (630 kW) later in 1997. Other improvements made to the D11R were fingertip controls and electronic clutch and brakes. The finger tip controls (FTC) allowed the D11R to be steered with small fingertip clutches on the left hand side. The D11R now weighed 230,935 lb (104,750 kg). The Carrydozer version has a special blade with a curvature that allowed 57 cy ( 43.6 m³) to be pushed. This blade design was introduced by Komatsu on their D575 A-2 dozers in 1995 as the Superdozer version. The deeper curvature of the Carrydozer/Superdozer blades literally carry the dirt moved, and the weight of the load increases pressure on the undercarriage and is thereby increasing the traction of the bulldozer. The increased weight on the undercarriage means also higher contact pressure between rollers and track links, which can increase wear significantly. These higher undercarriage costs must be considered when opting for a Carrydozer version. Komatsu developed a lengthened Superdozer undercarriage with two additional rollers per side to reduce wear, a step that Caterpillar avoided for their Carrydozer machines. The Carrydozer had the structure strengthened considerably for the extra weight and the much bigger blade that it carried up front, also, the ripper was fitted with an additional counterweight block. Both D11R and D11R CD received a new Caterpillar 3508B EUI electronically controlled unit injector diesel engine with electronic controls at 915 gross hp (682 kW). The Carrydozer's weight is just over 120 short tons (110 t) at 248,600 pounds (112,800 kg). According to Caterpillar, by the year 2000 over 3,000 D11s had been produced at their plant in East Peoria.

=== D11T & D11T CD ===
The current D11T was introduced in early 2008 and is also 850 hp (630 kW). It comes as a regular bulldozer and a Carrydozer like the previous model. As with the D11R, the D11T Carrydozer can push 57.9 cubic yards (44.3 m^{3}) while the regular D11T can push 45 cubic yards (34 m^{3}) of earth. A new D11T was on display at the Caterpillar display at Minexpo during the 22 to 24 September 2008 expo in Las Vegas, Nevada.

The D11T and D11T CD are both powered by the CAT C32 engine with ACERT technology. The D11R and the D11T differ in the configuration and layout of their operator controls; several levers have been changed into electronic switches, and several controls have been moved for increased visibility. Another difference is that the D11T has its exhaust mufflers closer to the front of the cab, similar to the D10T. They stand taller than the ones on the D11N/D11R.

In November 2018, a number of enhancements were introduced and announced for the current D11T/D11T CD machines.

== Shipping ==
These machines are so big that they must be partially dismantled for shipment to most sites. Some are shipped in the United States by railroad flatcars with the blade, push arms and ripper frame removed. Others are dismantled into several units for transport by multiple semi-trailer trucks.

== Blade options ==
The dozer blade on front of the tractor usually comes in three varieties:

- A straight blade ("S-Blade"), which is short and has no lateral curve, no side wings, and can be used for fine grading.
- A universal blade ("U-Blade"), which is tall and very curved, and has large side wings to carry more material.
- A semi universal ( "S-U" Blade ) combination blade, which is shorter, has less curvature, and smaller side wings.

There is also a special "Coal U-Blade", capable of carrying 74.9 cubic metres (98.0 yd^{3}). These are only attached to bulldozers that work solely on coal.

=== Applications ===
D11s are primarily used for moving large quantities of material (dirt, rock, aggregate, soil etc.) short distances in relatively confined places. For example, they are often used in quarries. The D11 is most commonly found in use in large scale forestry, mining, and quarry operations.

D11s can be adapted for agricultural and rock ripping by fitting a ripper, a long claw-like device on the back of the tractor. Rippers can come singly (single shank) or in groups of two or more (multi shank rippers). Usually, a single shank is preferred for heavy ripping.

Ripping rock allows the ground surface rock to be broken into small, easy to handle and transport rubble which can then be removed so that grading can take place.

Agricultural ripping allows rocky or very hard earth to be broken up so that otherwise inarable land can be used for agriculture. For example, much of the best land in the California wine country consists of old lava flows. Ripping shatters the igneous rock, allowing the growth of wine grapes. Hard earth can also be ripped and decompacted to allow the planting of orchards which otherwise could not grow on the land.

== Competition ==
The nearest direct competitor to the Caterpillar D11 is the Komatsu D475. The Caterpillar D11 can be distinguished from the Komatsu D475 by the elevated drive sprocket, or "High Drive" system, which results in a triangular, rather than oval, shaped track. The updated version of the Komatsu, the D575A, is the world's largest production bulldozer at 168 short tons (152 t) and 1,150 hp (860 kW). A bigger machine, the Acco super bulldozer, was built by Italian firm ACCO, with twin Caterpillar diesel engines giving a combined power of 1,300 hp (970 kW), and weighing 183 short tons (166 t), in the 1980s, but this was a custom built model.

== Image gallery ==
These images are of a Caterpillar D11R III.

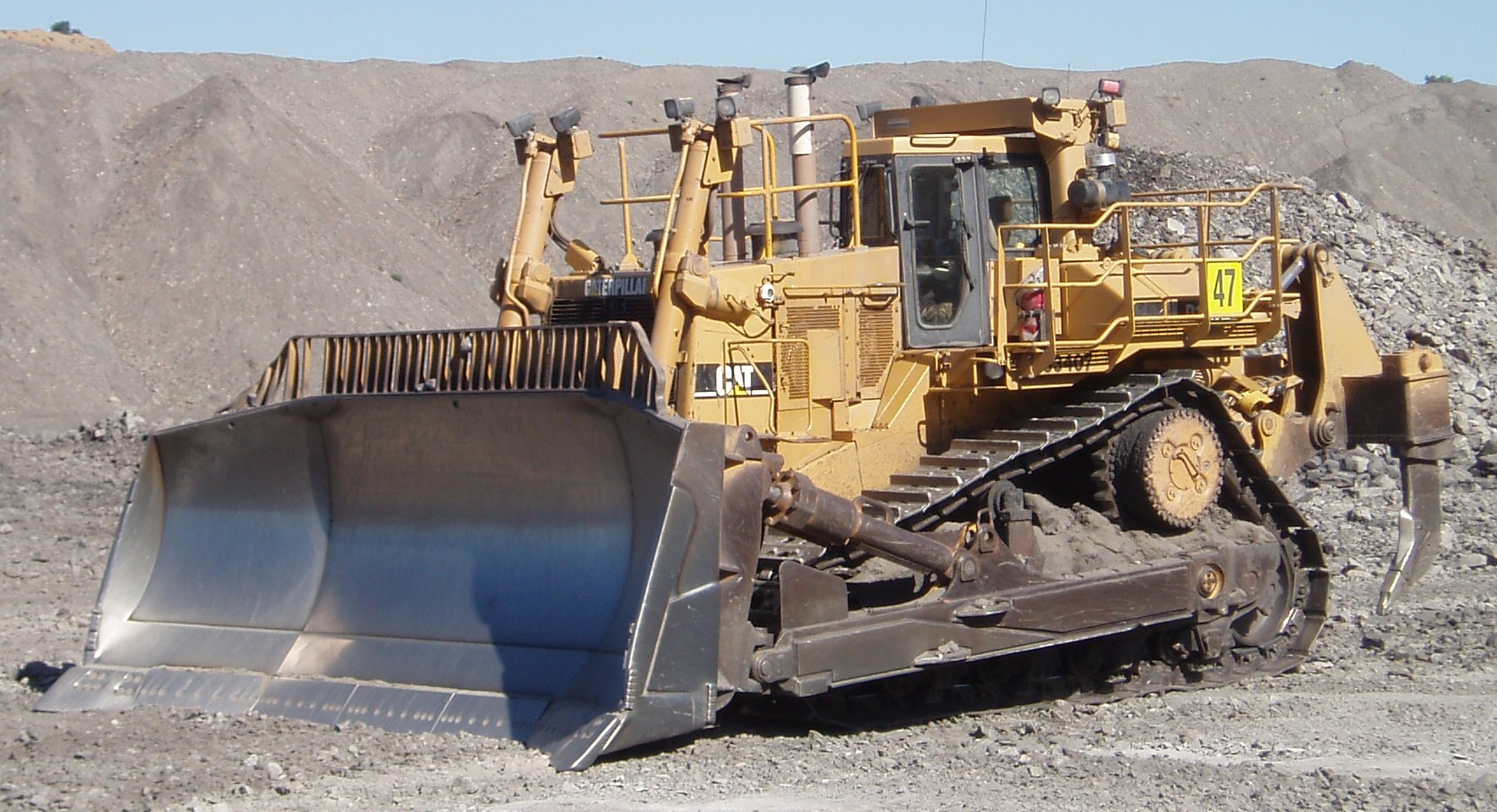
Front-quarter view

Side view

Rear-quarter view

== See also ==
- Benjamin Holt
- Civil engineering
- Heavy equipment
- Komatsu Limited
- Tractor
