= Caterpillar D10 =

Large bulldozer

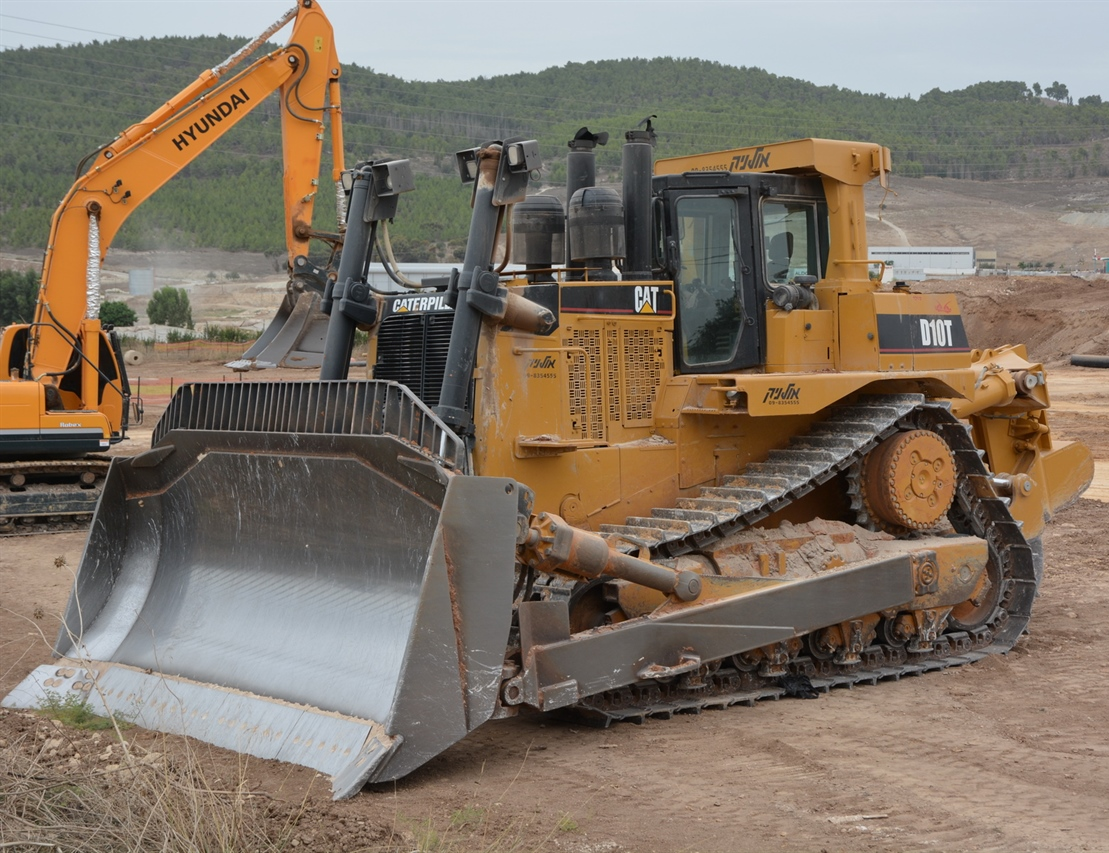
Caterpillar D10T

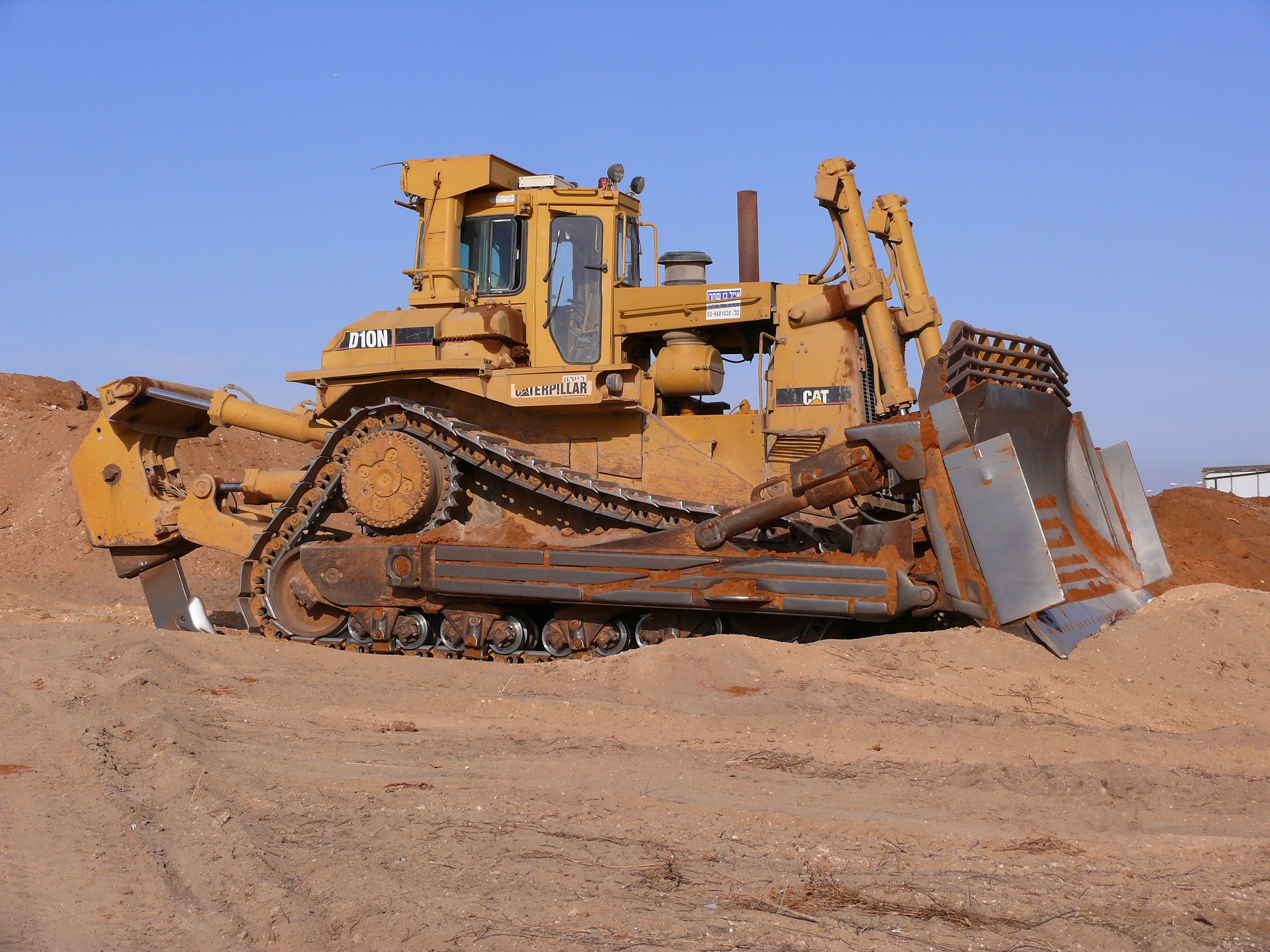
Caterpillar D10N

The Caterpillar D10 is a bulldozer originally manufactured by Caterpillar between 1977 and 1987, when it was superseded by the D11; the successor of the smaller D9L was then rebranded as the D10N, which series of models continues to be produced (under the subsequent D10R, D10T, and—once again, as of 2023—D10 designations). It was the first modern tractor to use the elevated drive sprocket to improve durability, operator comfort, and ease of maintenance.

== History ==
The Caterpillar D10 was the result of a need for a tractor larger than the Caterpillar D9. At this time, competitors were building bulldozers that were more powerful than the D9. Allis-Chalmers introduced at Conexpo 69 in Chicago a 524 hp (391 kW) HD-41 which was the largest crawler in the world. In 1974 after Allis Chalmers and Fiat merged their construction equipment divisions, the 524 hp (391 kW) 41-B was introduced. For example, the Fiatallis 41-B track-type tractor had 524 hp (391 kW) at the time, while the D9H had 410 hp (310 kW). In 1976 Japanese company Komatsu came out with an even larger bulldozer called the D455A at 620 hp (460 kW) and 167,000 lb (76,000 kg).

The first pilot D10 was D10X1 and was shown in July 1973 at a big Caterpillar corporate meeting. Other prototypes would follow in 1975 and 1977. In March 1977, prototypes P-1 through P-10 would appear and be subsequently dispatched to different job sites. The D10 was introduced at a dealer meeting by Caterpillar in the fall of 1977. Between 1978 and 1986 nearly 1,000 D10s were made at Caterpillar's East Peoria, Illinois, plant. The D10 had sales of their Fiatallis/Komatsu competitive sized bulldozers combined. With the introduction of the N-Series tractors in 1986-87 Caterpillar adjusted the model numbers of their larger bulldozers and pushed them up one, resulting in the D9N replacing the D8L, the D10N replacing the D9L, and the new D11N replacing the D10. A new D8N model was also introduced, smaller than the old D8L.

The D10 was large enough to do about 50 percent more production than the D9H.

== High Drive system ==
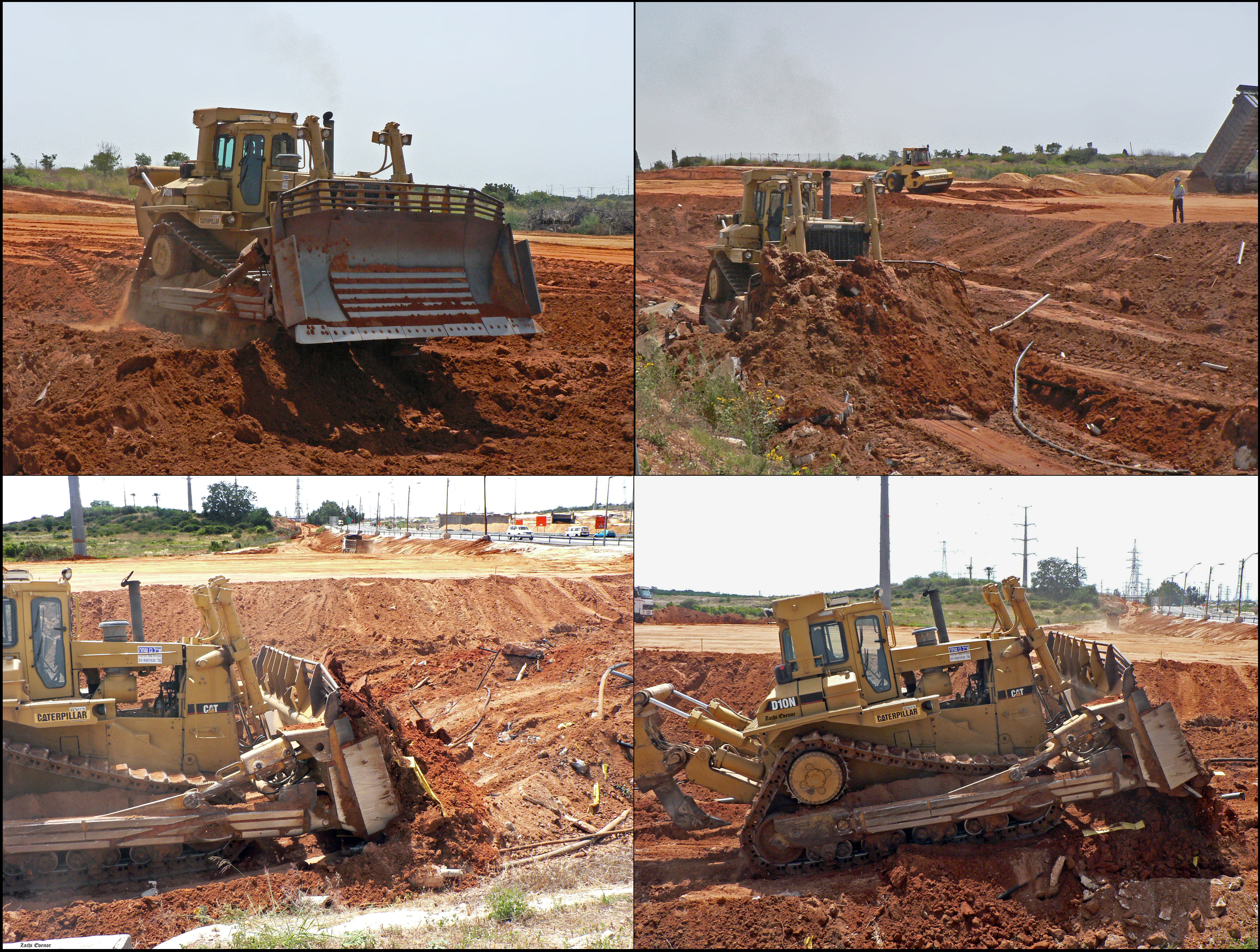
CAT D10N at work in Rishon LeZion, Israel

Among modern tractors, the High Drive (elevated sprocket) design was unique to Caterpillar products. The concept originated in 1914 with Caterpillar predecessor C. L. Best Tractor's 30 Humpback; this tractor was discontinued a year later, and the only other tractor to use the concept until the D10's introduction was the Cletrac Model F, built between 1920 and 1922. The elevated sprocket system was first applied to a 10-machine test run of the D10 in 1977. It separated the suspension from the tractor's drive train, dramatically reducing stress on both and increasing their durability. Prior to this, the combined system, which put the drive axle under constant strain of the vehicle's load and terrain beneath it, was prone to frequent failure. Elevating the drive sprocket allowed for a more absorbent suspension, which provided better traction, reduced component wear and operator fatigue, and isolated the drive sprocket in a flexible section of the machine's tracks. It also allowed for the relocation of the transmission behind and beneath the operator, providing better weight distribution and improved traction, and permitting more compact location of both the blade and rear implements. The high-drive system also eliminates the traditional geared final drive in favor of a modular system employing a hydraulic planetary final drive, which withstands engine torque better, since it distributes the forces over multiple gear teeth instead of a single tooth as in the traditional system. The disadvantage is that the track moves around one more idler, reducing track life. Caterpillar claims to have alleviated this with the SALT (Sealed and Lubricated Track), a permanently lubricated track system which was introduced on their track-type tractors in the early 1970s.

== Introduction ==
When the D10 was introduced in 1977, it was the most powerful track-type tractor ever built at 700 horsepower (520 kW) . The Cat D10 could be ordered with up to a 19-foot (5.8 m) U-blade, and weighed in at 180,000 lb (82,000 kg). Later versions weighed in at 190,000 lb (86,000 kg). The U-blade was 7 feet (2.1 m) high and could push 35 yd^{3} (27 m^{3}) according to Caterpillar's literature. The November 1977 issue of Excavating Contractor magazine had a two-page story on the bulldozer titled "Cat Uncorks The New D10". One of the first D10s is currently sitting in front of the East Peoria, Ill plant where it was made. A picture of this D10 can be found in the book The Caterpillar Century, on pages 298-297. Caterpillar put the 1,786 cid V-12 twin turbocharged D348 in the D10 to power it. This had already proven itself in the 777 off-highway hauler and the 550 hp (410 kW) 10 yards (9.1 m) 992/992B wheel loaders from 1968 on. The early D10s came with a single large black exhaust-stack up front; however, engine problems attributable to exhaust-system routing resulted in newer (1980 onward) models being constructed with two exhaust-stacks up front instead, as a corrective measure. At the time, Caterpillar's bulldozer lineup was the 62 hp (46 kW) D3, 75 hp (56 kW) D4E, 105 hp (78 kW) D5B, 140 hp (100 kW) D6D, 200 hp (150 kW) D7G, 300 hp (220 kW) D8K, and 410 hp (310 kW) D9H with the addition of the 700 hp (520 kW) D10.

In 1986 an even larger dozer, the 770 hp (570 kW) Caterpillar D11⁣⁣N, was introduced to replace the D10. The D11 carried on the success of the elevated drive sprocket system in large bulldozers. The currently available D10 model, and preceding D10T, D10R and D10N variants, are not the original D10's successors; rather, the D11N, D11R and the current D11T are.

== Gallery ==
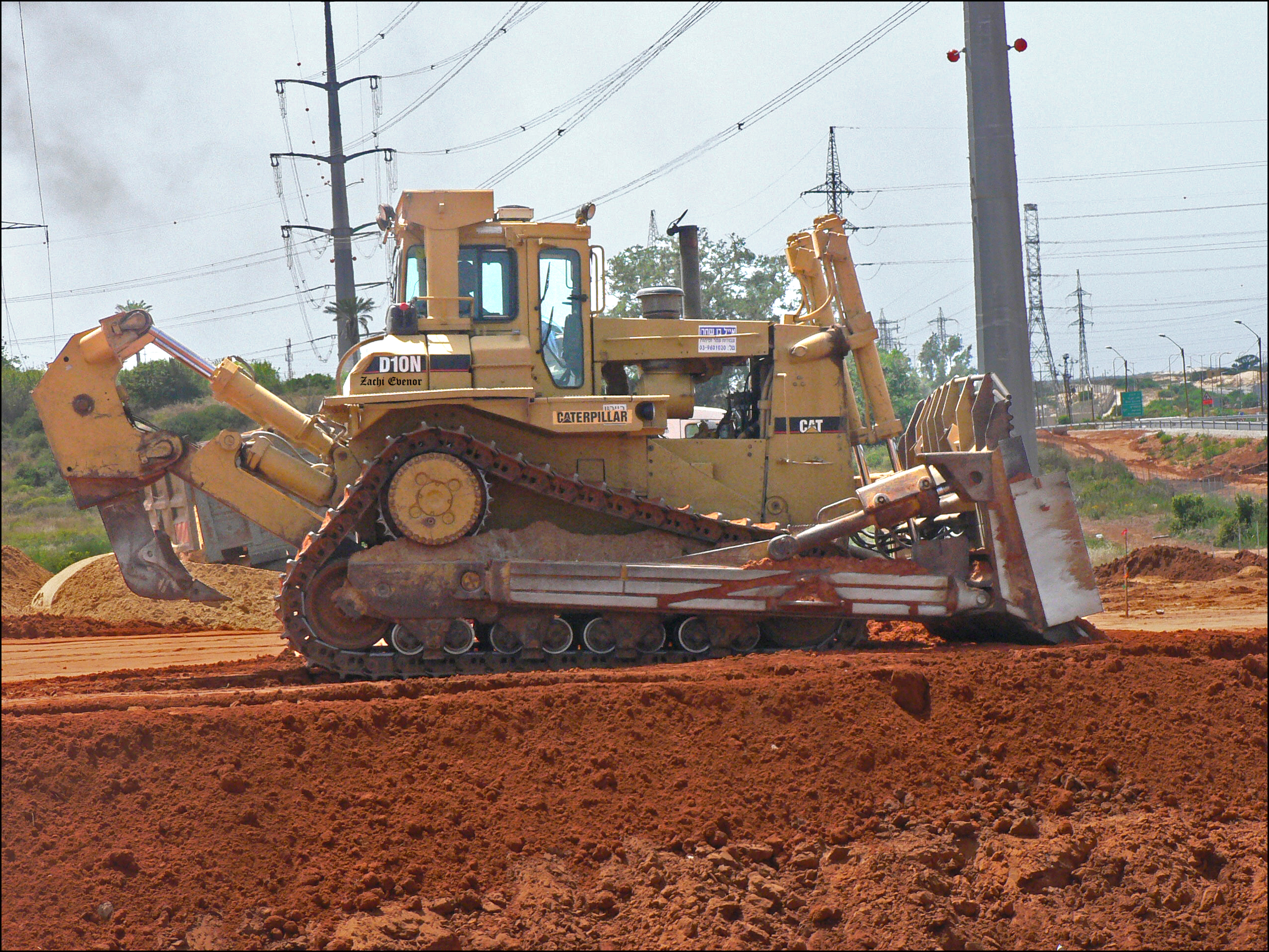
CAT D10N

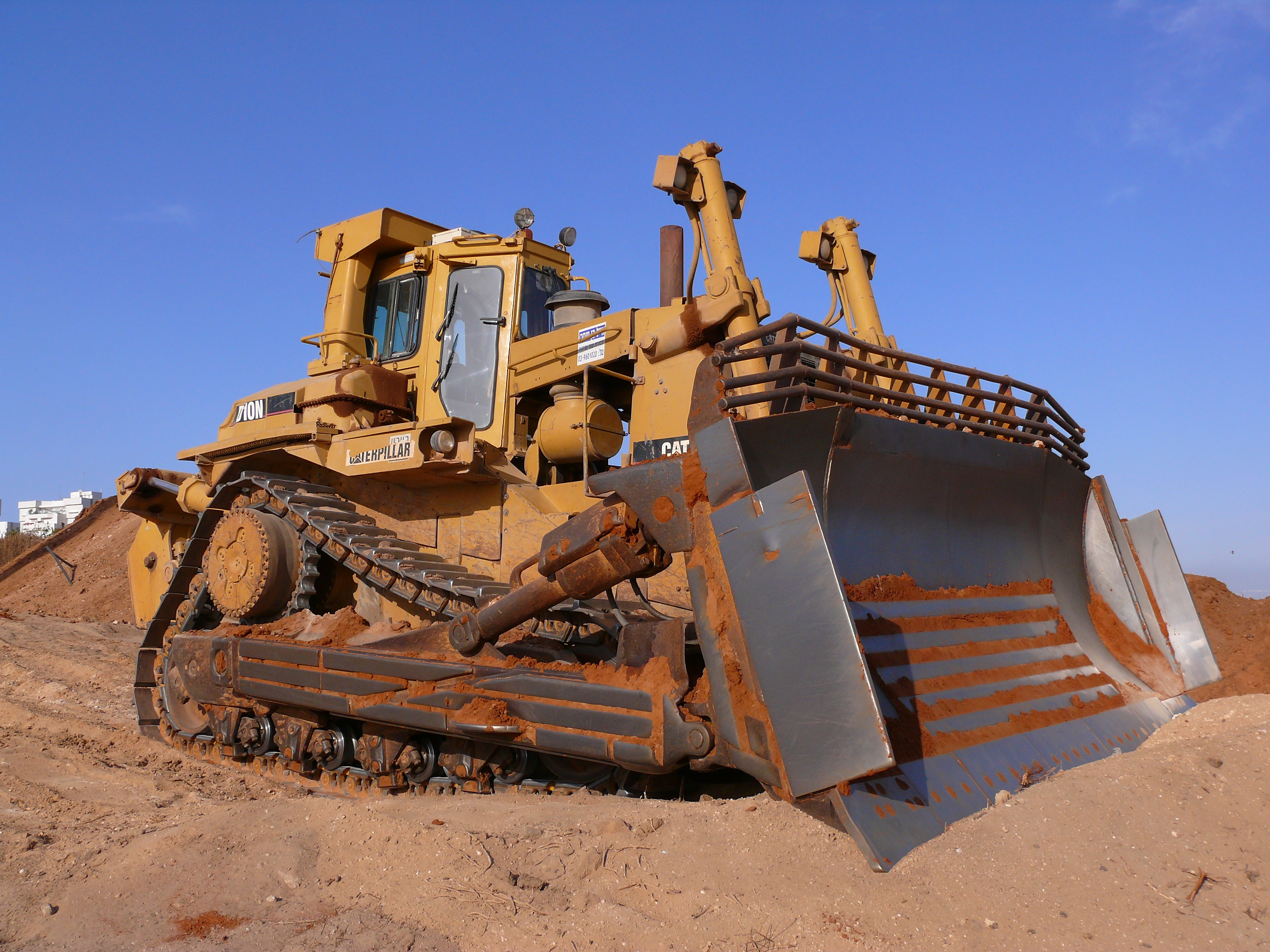
CAT D10N

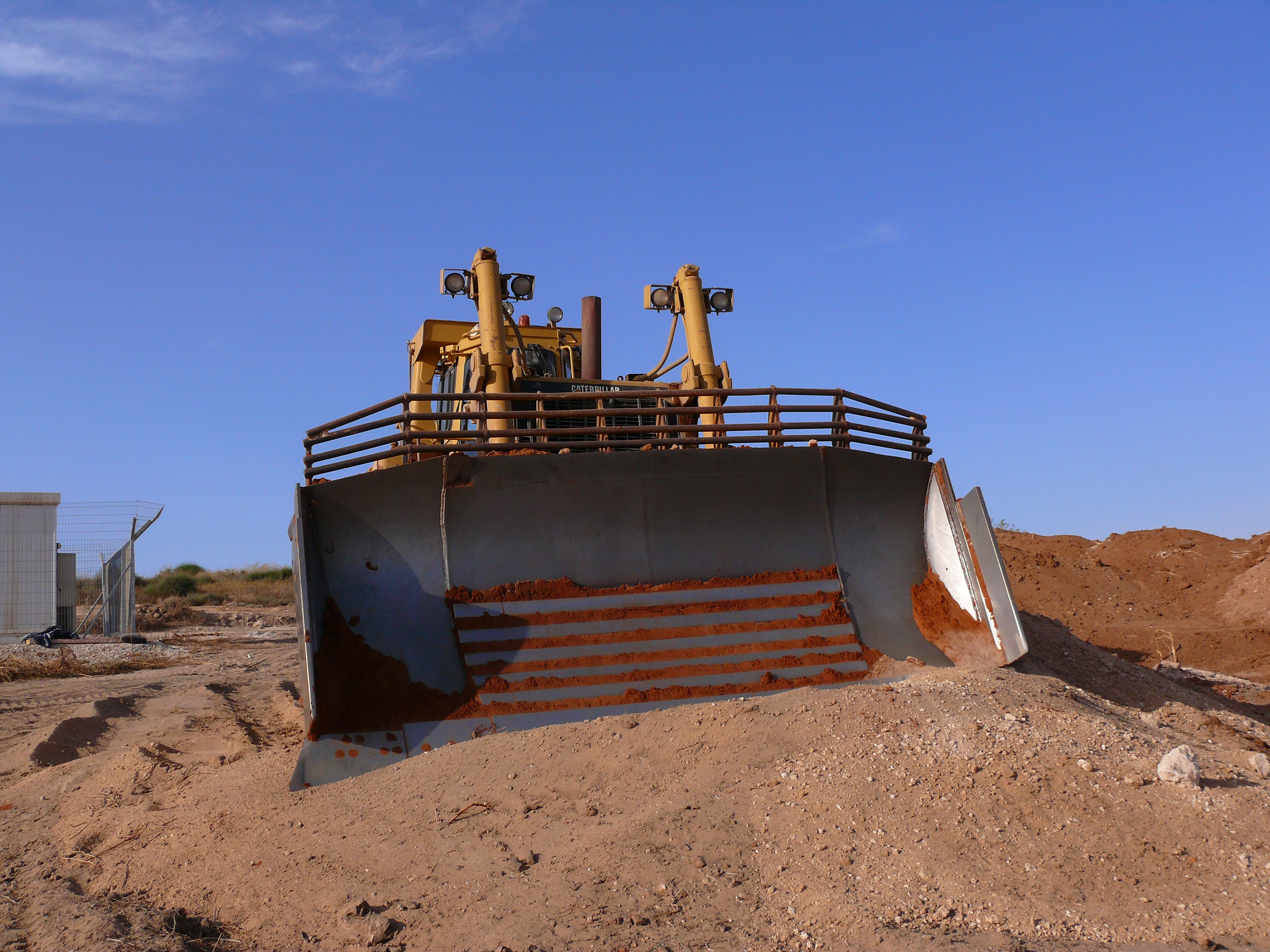
Blade

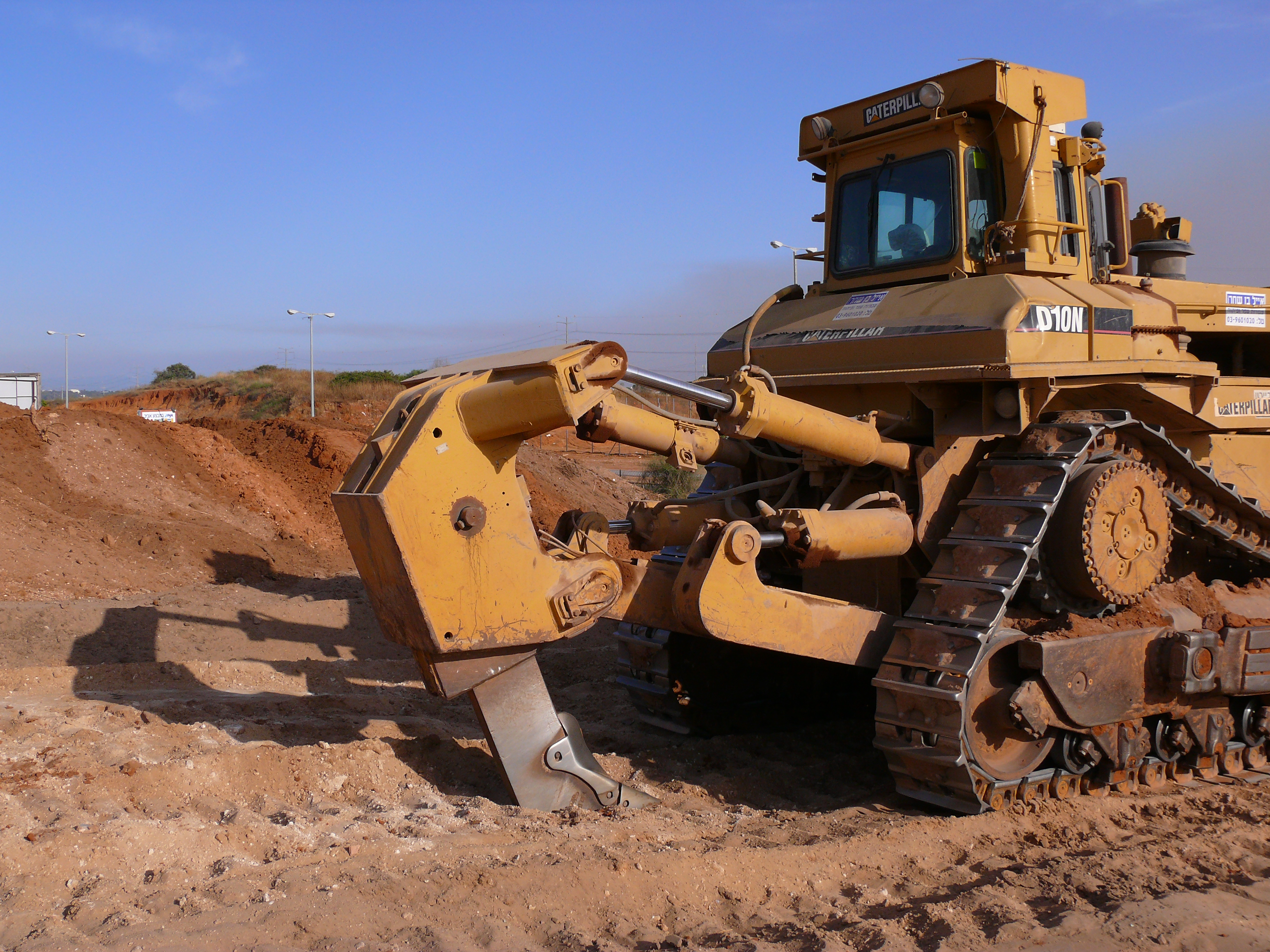
Rear ripper
