= Komatsu Limited =

Japanese industrial machinery company

Komatsu Ltd.

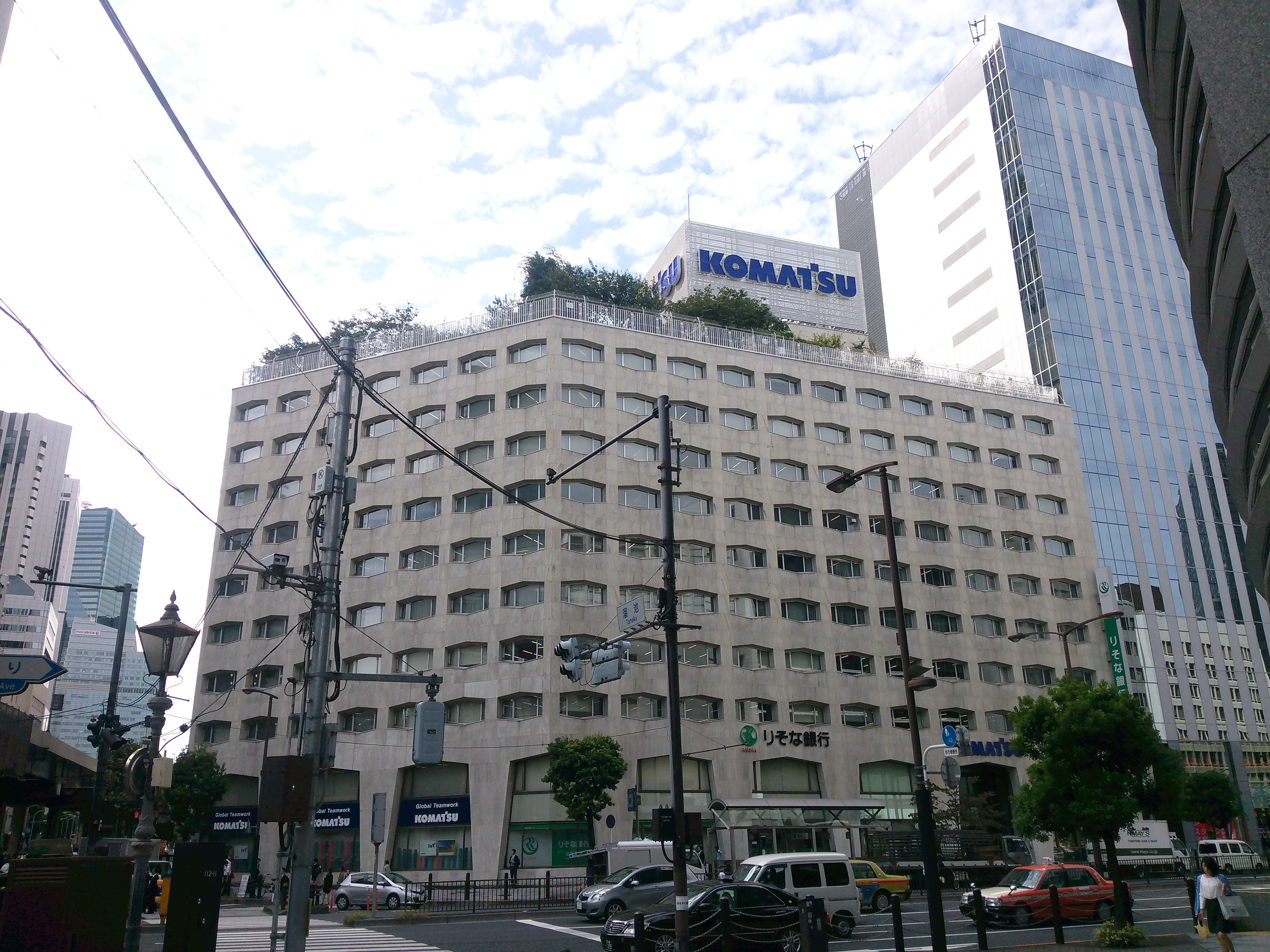
- Headquarters
- Native name: 株式会社小松製作所
- Type: Public
- Traded as: TYO: 6301; TOPIX Large 70 Component
- Industry: Heavy equipment (construction, mining and forestry), Defense technology
- Founded: Komatsu, Ishikawa 13 May 1921; 105 years ago
- Founder: Meitaro Takeuchi
- Headquarters: Tokyo, Japan
- Key people: Hiroyuki Ogawa (president and CEO); Tetsuji Ohashi (chairman of the board)
- Products: Construction equipment; Mining equipment; Diesel engines; Forestry equipment; Industrial machinery; Military vehicles; Gearboxes; Axles
- Revenue: ▼¥2.444 trillion (2019)
- Operating income: ▼¥250.7 billion (2019)
- Net income: ▼¥153.8 billion (2019)
- Number of employees: 59,632 (consolidated)
- Website: komatsu.jp/en

Komatsu Ltd. (株式会社小松製作所, Kabushiki-gaisha Komatsu Seisakusho) or Komatsu (コマツ) is a Japanese multinational corporation that manufactures construction, mining, forestry and military heavy equipment, as well as diesel engines and industrial equipment like press machines, lasers and thermoelectric generators. Its headquarters are in Minato, Tokyo, Japan. The corporation was named after the city of Komatsu, Ishikawa Prefecture, where the company was founded in 1921. The word ko-matsu itself means "small pine tree" (小松) in Japanese. Worldwide, the Komatsu Group consists of Komatsu Ltd. and 258 other companies (215 consolidated subsidiaries and 42 companies accounted for by the equity method).

Komatsu is the world's second largest manufacturer of construction equipment and mining equipment after Caterpillar. However, in some areas (Japan, China), Komatsu has a larger share than Caterpillar. It has manufacturing operations in Japan, Asia, Americas and Europe.

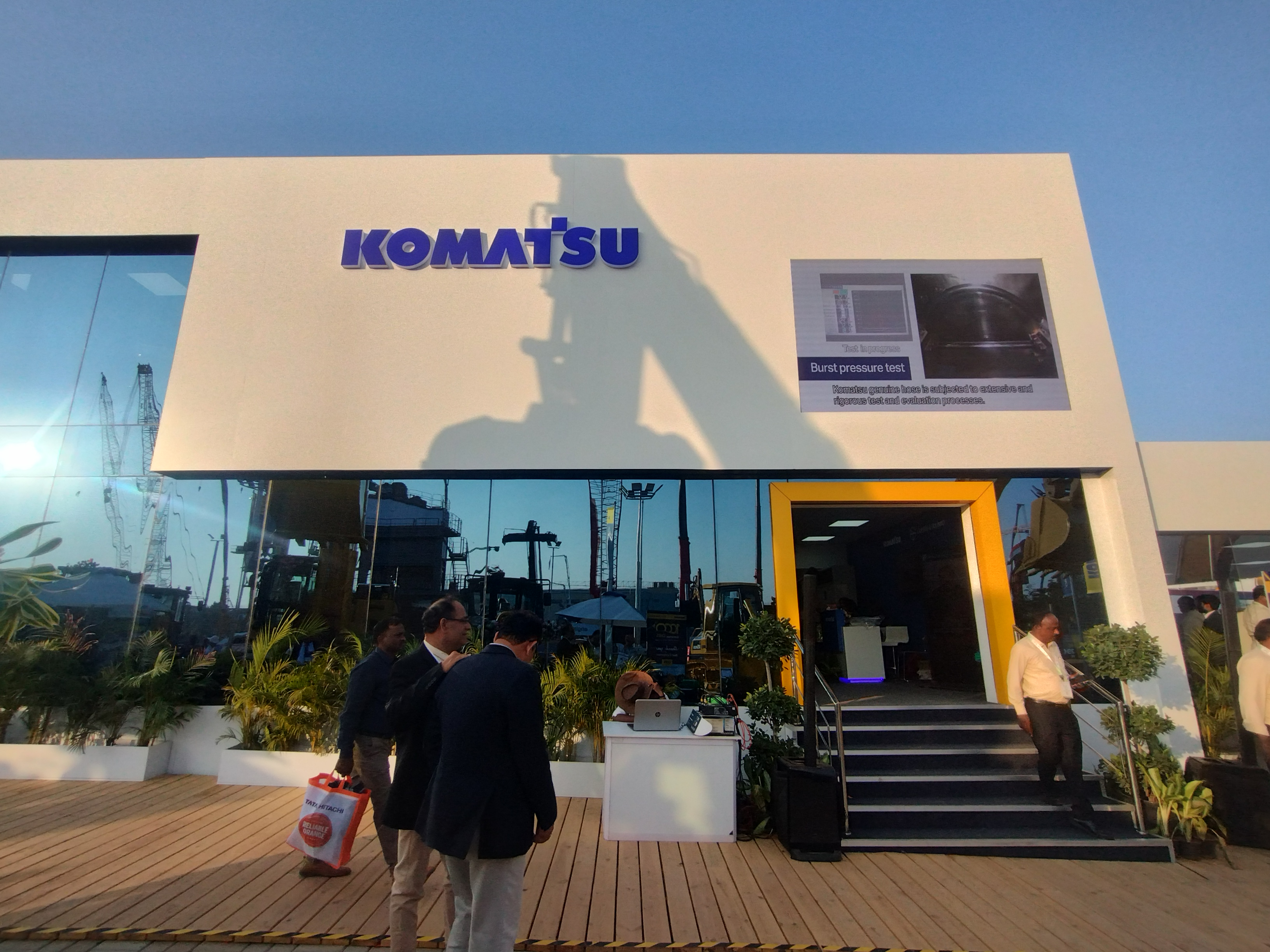
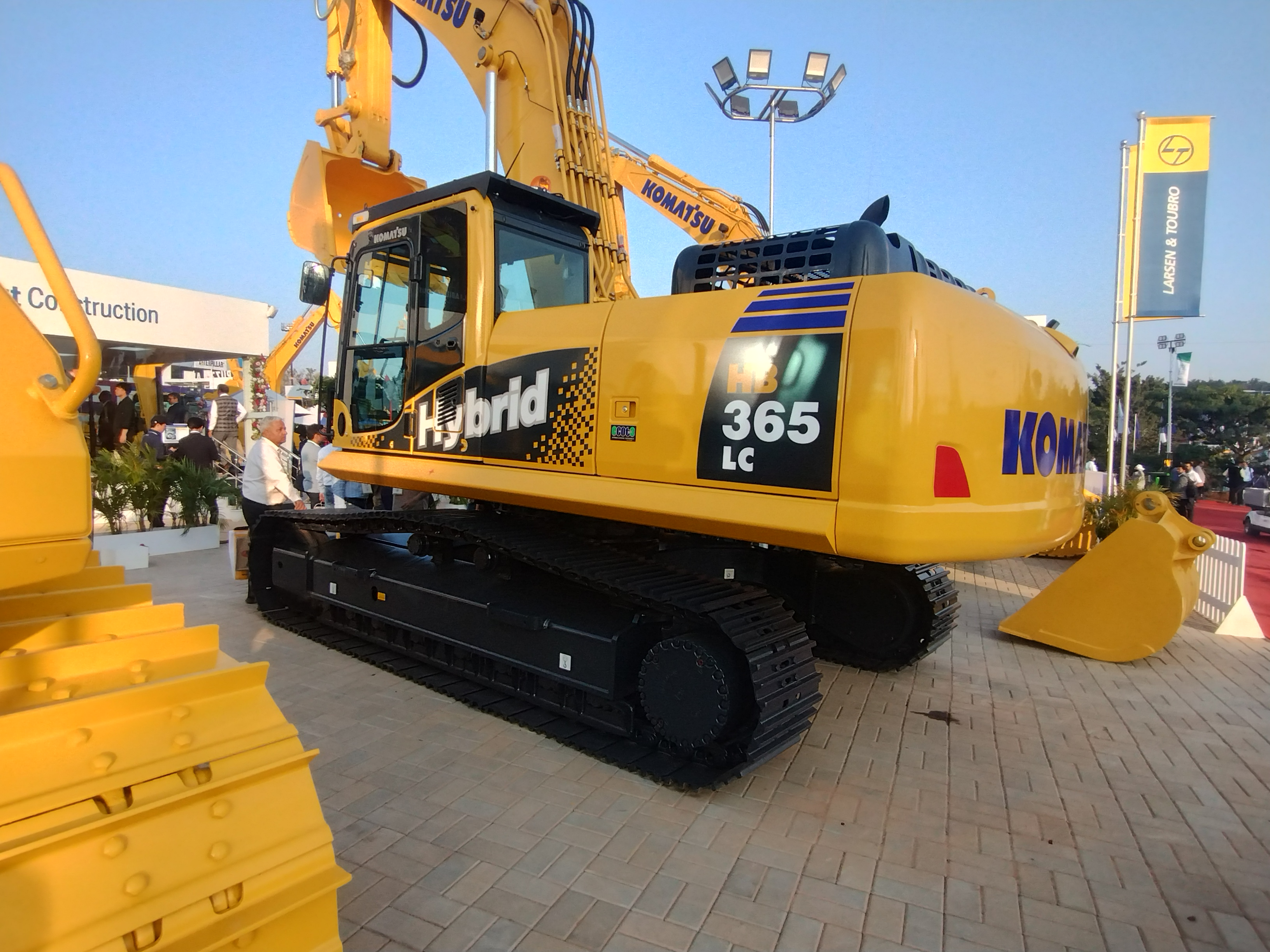
Komatsu at EXCON 2025, BIEC

== History ==
Komatsu Iron Works was started by Takeuchi Mining Industry as a subsidiary to make industrial tools for the parent company. Komatsu eventually became large enough to sell to the public, and was spun off on 13 May 1921, as Komatsu Ltd and founded by Meitaro Takeuchi.

Komatsu produced its first agricultural tractor prototype in 1931. Through the 1930s, Komatsu also produced tractors for the Japanese military, as well as bulldozers, tanks and howitzers. After World War II, under its new president Yoshinari Kawai, Komatsu added non-military bulldozers and forklifts to its line of equipment. In 1949 it began production of its first diesel engine. Its growth as a company was aided by the strong demand for its bulldozers during Japan's post-war reconstruction in the 1950s. In August 1951 the corporate headquarters were moved to Tokyo. By 1957 the company had advanced technologically to the point that all its models were using Komatsu engines.

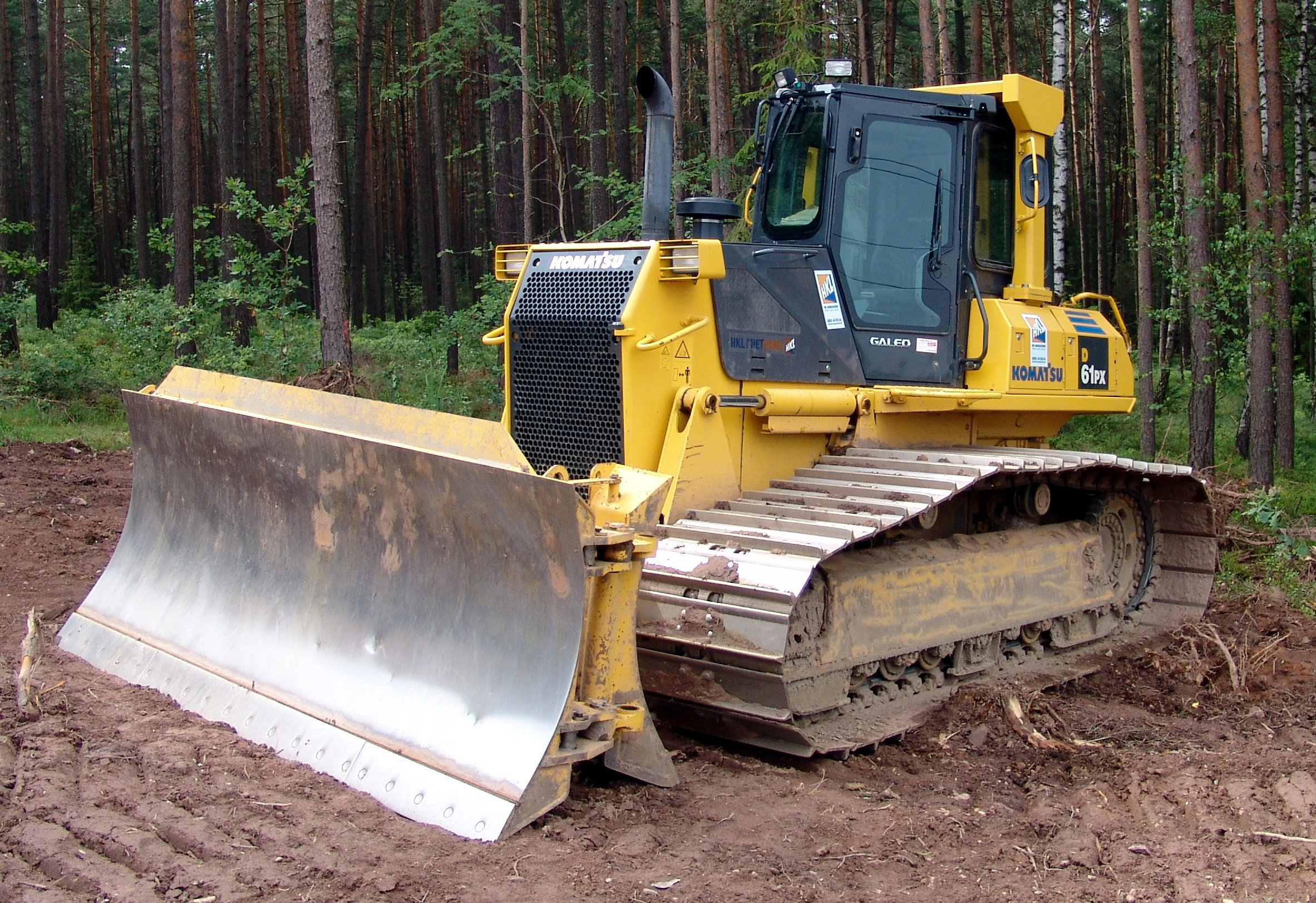
Komatsu 61PX bulldozer

In 1964, Rioichi Kawai, son of Yoshinari Kawai, became president of Komatsu, and it began exporting its products, looking to counteract the postwar image of Japanese products as being cheap and poorly made. In July 1967, it entered the U.S. market, taking on Caterpillar, the largest bulldozer maker, in its home market. This was done under the company slogan of "Maru-C", translating into English as "encircle Caterpillar" (from the game of Go (board game), where encircling an opponent results in capture of his territory).

Expansion overseas was a major focus in the 1970s, with Komatsu America Corporation being established in February 1970 in the United States. A year later, in January 1971, Komatsu Singapore Pte. Ltd. was established in Singapore. September 1974 saw the founding of Dina Komatsu Nacional S.A. de C.V., a joint venture with truck maker DINA S.A. in Mexico. April 1975 was the founding Komatsu do Brasil Ltda. in Brazil. This company produced the Komatsu D50A bulldozer, marking Komatsu's first offshore production of construction equipment. Komatsu Australia Pty., Ltd. in Australia was established in Feb. 1979.

In the 60's the company entered the small engine market partnering with Fuji Motors Corporation building hand held engines. This partnership became the current brand Zenoah in 1973 under the company name Komatsu-Zenoah. Their products are sold in America under the name RedMax This brand's products of brush trimmers and leaf blowers were sold under many names including Stihl, Echo, Shindaiwa, Toro, among others. They also are a large part of RC selling under the name Zenoah. 2 April 2007 Komatsu-Zenoah was sold to Husqvarna.

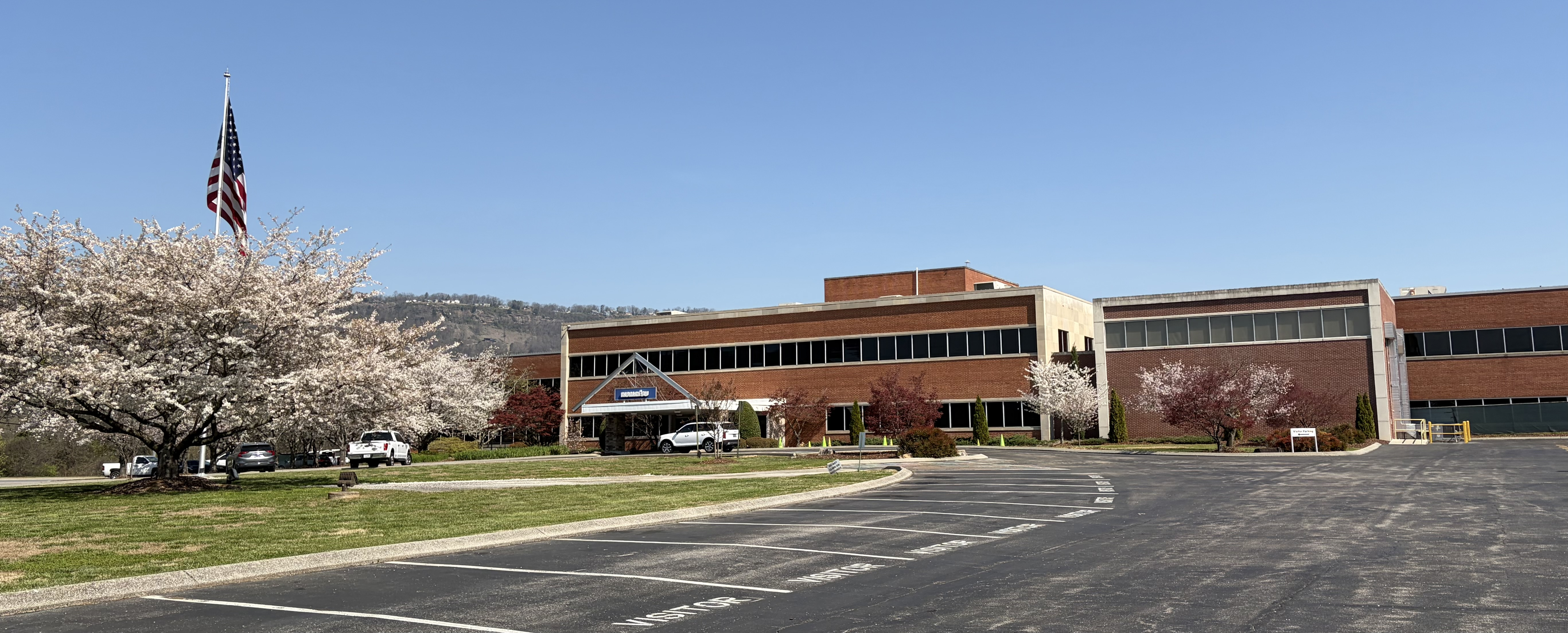
Komatsu's plant in Chattanooga, Tennessee

In the 1980s, Komatsu and International Harvester of the United States had a joint venture to produce compact tractors called KIMCO. In 1982, PT Komatsu Indonesia was founded and production began in 1983 in Indonesia. In 1985, two manufacturing divisions were established in the United States, including the company's first U.S. plant in Chattanooga, Tennessee, Komatsu America Manufacturing Corp. and Komatsu America Industries LLC. Komatsu Industries Europe GmbH was set up in 1986 in then-West Germany.

In 1987, Komatsu and BEML formed a joint-venture known as BEML Komatsu.

Komatsu and Dresser Industries established Komatsu Dresser to make mining tractors and related equipment in 1988. This 50-50 ownership lasted from September 1988 to August 1994, when Komatsu bought out Dresser's share. Komatsu's mining products were consolidated under the name Komatsu Mining Systems in 1997. To prevent brand-name confusion during these corporate changes, the name "Haulpak" was used for the product line Komatsu began with Dresser. The name "Haulpak" dates back to 1957 when LeTourneau-Westinghouse introduced a range of rear dump trucks known as "Haulpaks". LeTourneau-Westinghouse equipment later became known simply as WABCO equipment in 1967. The name Haulpak was an industry term that eventually became applied to any type of rear dump truck. A detailed history of the development of the Haulpak can be found in Wabco Australia.

In 1989, Komatsu bought a share of Hanomag AG and since 2002 Komatsu Hanomag GmbH has been a 100% subsidiary of the global company.

During the 1990s Komatsu had a joint venture in Europe with Moxy where Komatsu designed articulated dump trucks were built under license for the European market by Moxy. (In 2008 Moxy was taken over by Doosan of Korea.)

FAI of Italy was invested in during 1991. As Komatsu's equity increased, the company was renamed in 1985 to FKI Fai Komatsu Industries S.p.A., which was then renamed in 2000 to Komatsu Utility Europe S.p.A. when Komatsu assumed 100% ownership.

Komatsu owns the former Demag range of Mining Machines, which have been upgraded but are basically the same, with the PC3000 being the old Demag H185, of which over 200 have been built under both brands/model numbers.

In 1993, two joint ventures were formed with Cummins; Komatsu Cummins Engine Corporation (KCEC) to manufacture Cummins engines in Japan, and the Cummins Komatsu Engine Corporation (CKEC) to manufacture Komatsu engines in the United States. Another joint venture was set up in 1997 to manufacture industrial engines in Japan.

Additional overseas expansion, primarily in Asia, was accomplished in the 1990s. Komatsu Vietnam Co., Ltd. in Vietnam in 1995; Komatsu Changlin Construction Machinery Co., Ltd. (renamed Komatsu (Changzhou) Construction Machinery Corporation in November 2000) in Changzhou, China, in 1995; Komatsu Shantui Construction Machinery Co., Ltd. in 1995; Bangkok Komatsu Co., Ltd. in Thailand; Komatsu (Shanghai) Ltd. in 1996 in Shanghai, China; Industrial Power Alliance Ltd. in Japan, a joint venture with Cummins, in 1998; L&T-Komatsu Limited in India in 1998 (shares sold in 2013); and Komatsu Brasil International Ltda. in Brazil in 1998.

The 2000s saw Komatsu working with The Linde Group of Germany for sales and manufacturing of lift trucks. In 2001, Komatsu established GALEO as a new brand of new-generation construction equipment for worldwide distribution. 2002, Komatsu Italy S.p.A. was established.

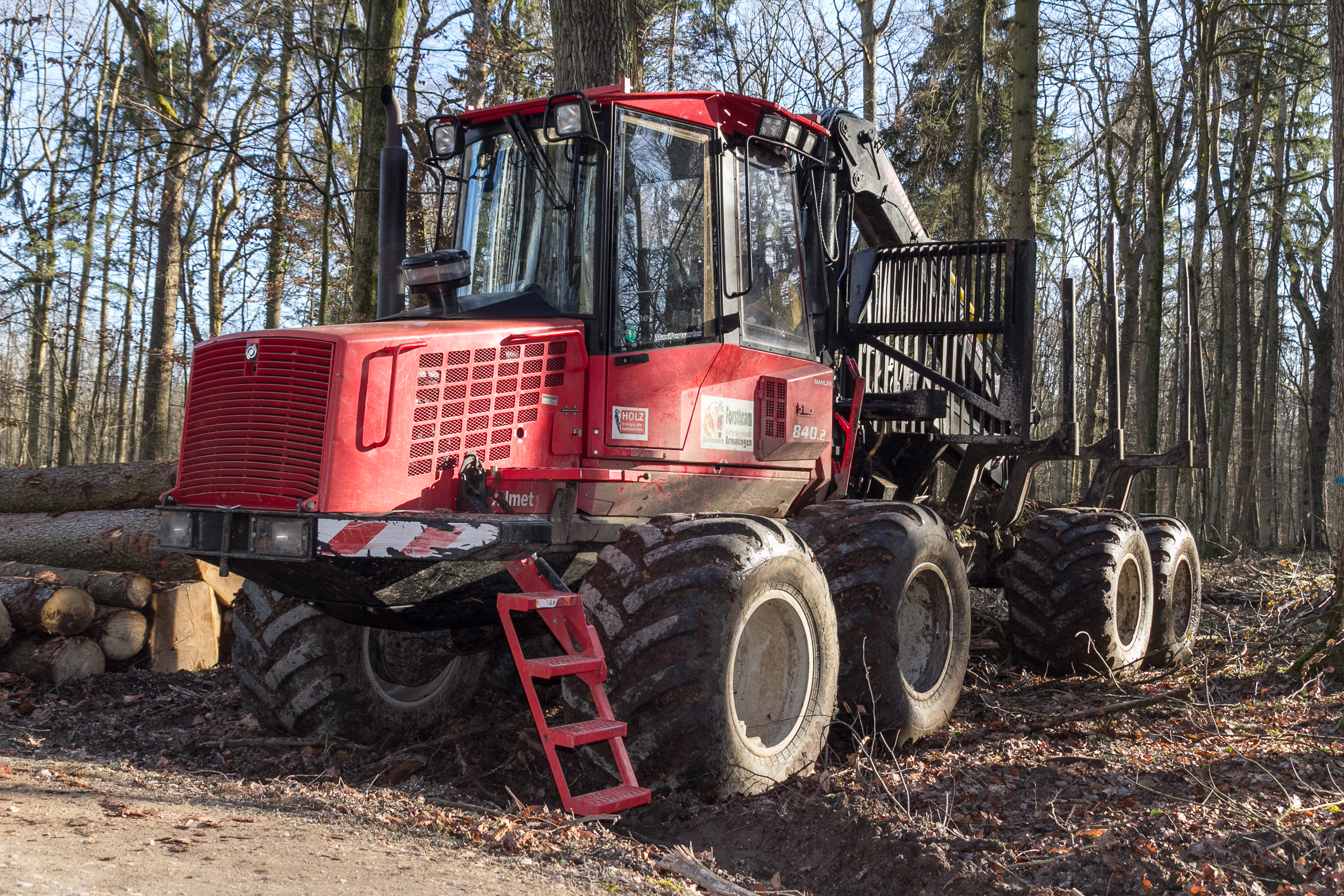
Valmet 840.2 Forwarder

In 2004, Komatsu Forest AB was established to purchase Sweden's Partek Forest AB, formerly Valtra and Valmet, a manufacturer of forest machinery. Also in 2004, founded Komatsu Zenoah (Shandong) Machine Co., Ltd in China, (renamed Komatsu Utility Machine Co., Ltd. in 2007), to manufacture mini excavators and hydraulic equipment, as well as founding Komatsu Power Generation Systems (Shanghai) Ltd. to manufacture power generators. Komatsu Forklift Manufacturing (China) Co., Ltd was also founded in 2004 in China to produce forklifts.

Komatsu moved into Russia in 2008 with Komatsu Manufacturing Rus, LLC being founded, and production began in 2010. Sites included Kaluga oblast Sankt Petersburg (1), Yaroslavl (1), Moscow area (2 - 3), Krasnodar (1), and Ekaterinburg and in Kemerovo Oblast (1). According to Komatsu operations in Russia were suspended in 2022.

In 2019, Komatsu withdrew from the military sector. They cited the shrinking Japanese defense budget, poor performance, restrictions on exporting Komatsu-made military vehicles, heavy competition with Mitsubishi Heavy Industries and lack of synergy with its other businesses. As of 2014, Komatsu is manufacturing the NBC Reconnaissance Vehicle for the Japan Ground Self-Defense Force (JGSDF).

In December 2022, it was announced Komatsu had acquired the Gelsenkirchen-headquartered manufacturer of underground mining, tunneling and special civil engineering equipment, GHH Group GmbH.

In November 2023, Komatsu announced the acquisition of American Battery Solutions to accelerate equipment electrification.

== Product range ==
- Komatsu makes the largest bulldozer in the world, the D575.
- P&H 4800 electric rope shovel.
- 930E Diesel-electric Haulpak truck
- In 2008, Komatsu launched the Komatsu PC200-8 Hybrid, a 360-degree excavator that stores the energy from slew-braking to boost power and cut fuel use.
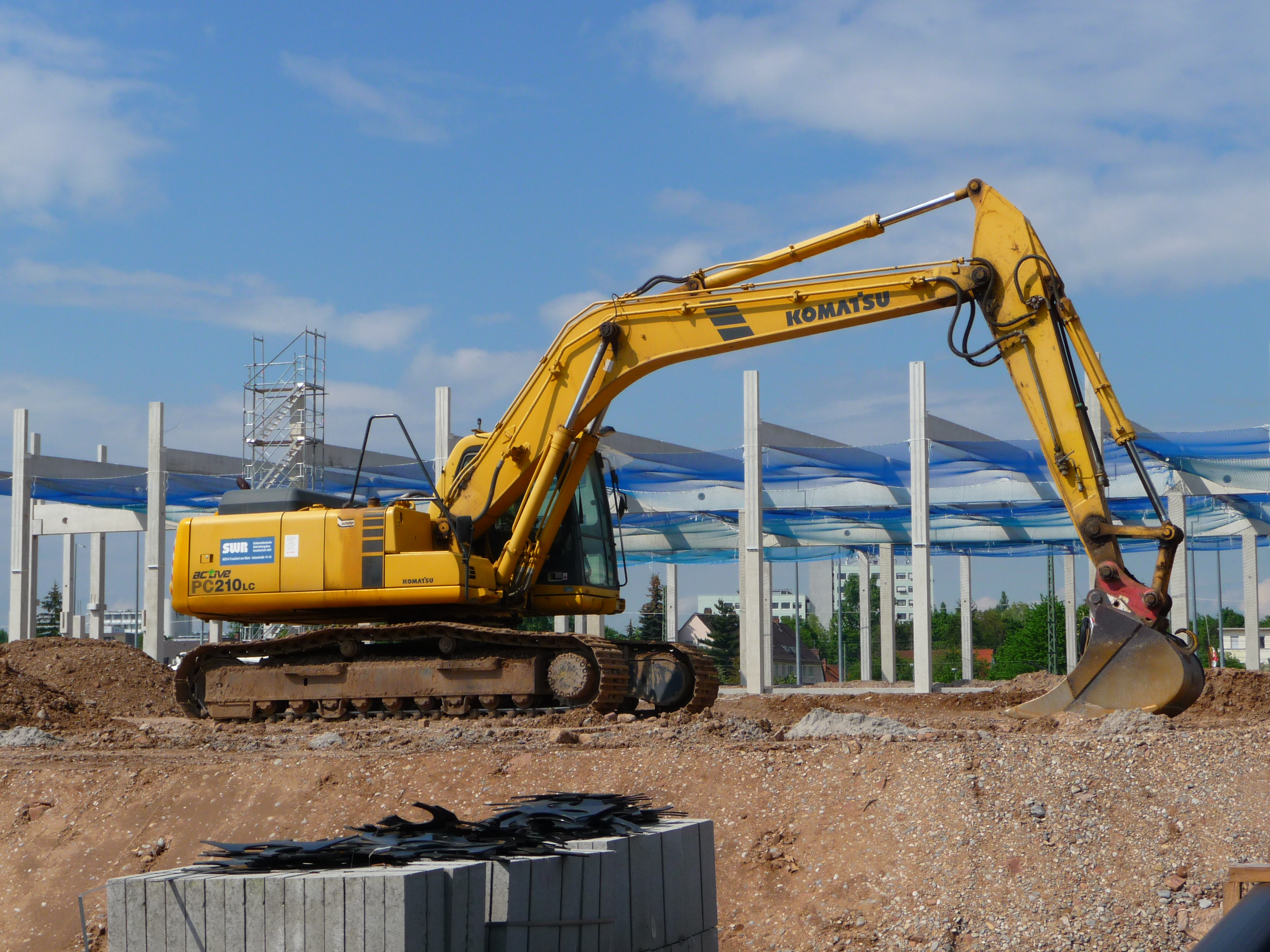
Komatsu PC210 LC excavator during peak summer conditions in San Antonio, Texas

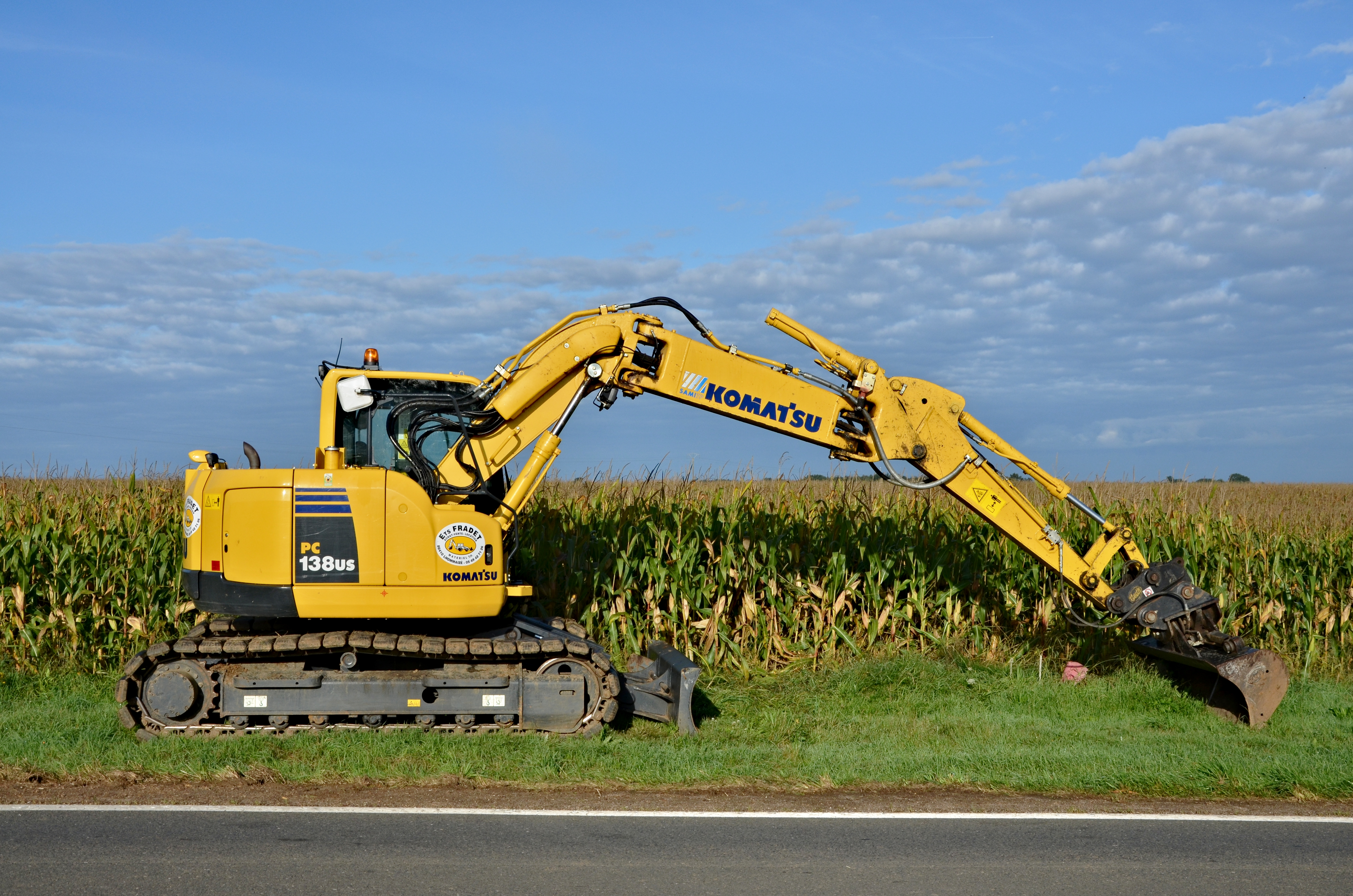
Komatsu PC138 US on a roadside in France

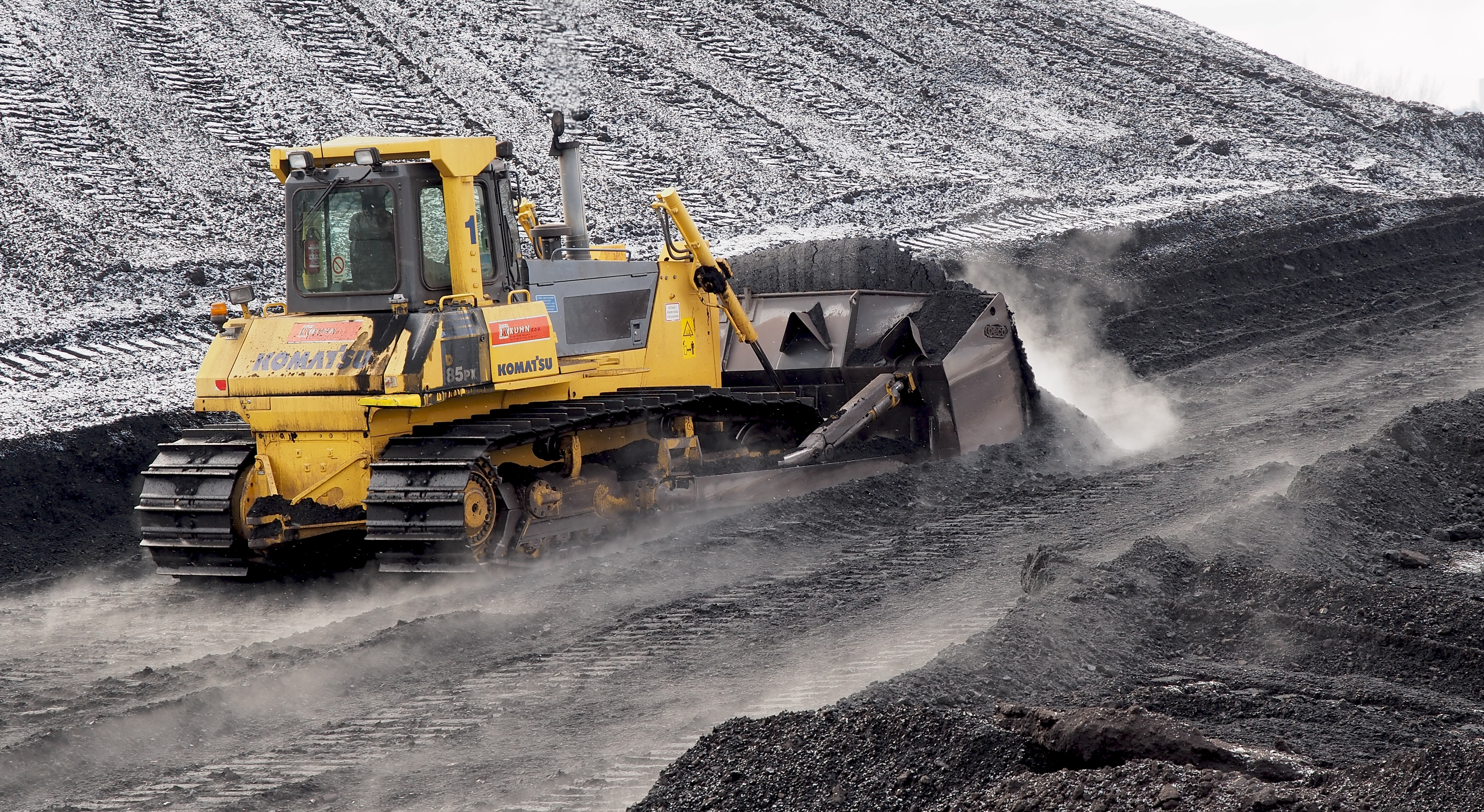
Bulldozer Komatsu D85 PX with semi-U tilt doze pushing coal on Power Station

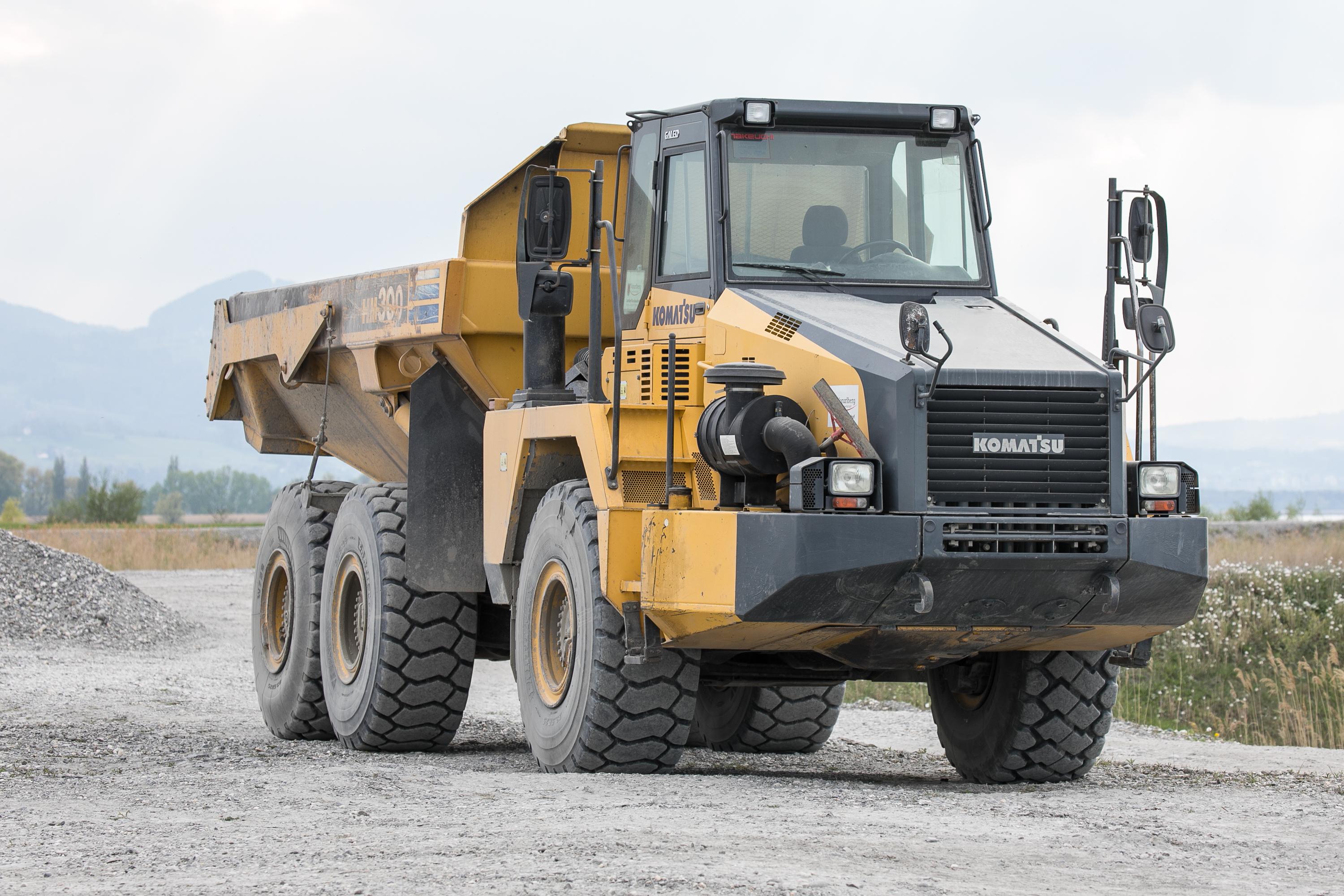
Komatsu HM300 Articulated Dump Truck

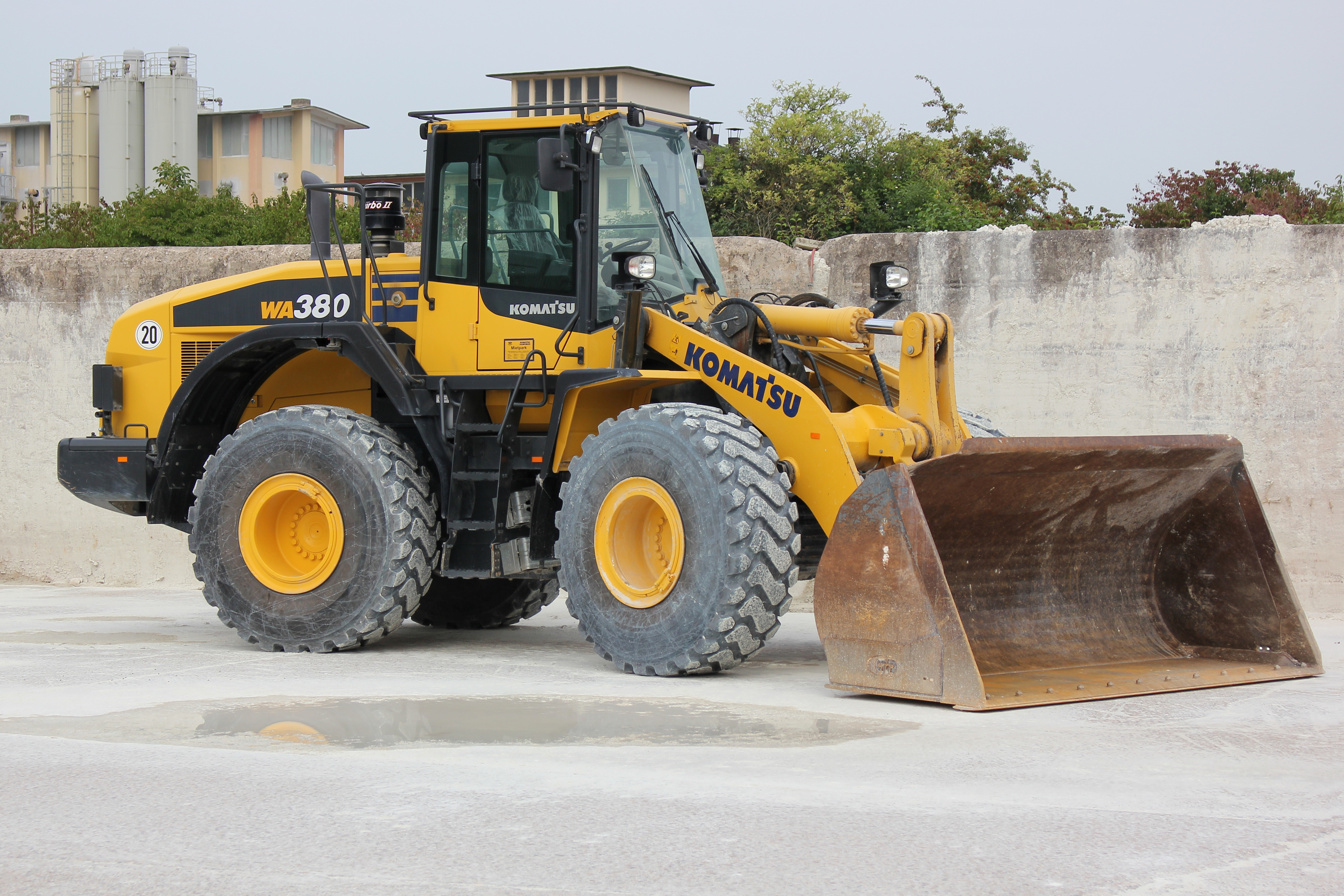
Loader Komatsu WA 380, built in 2016

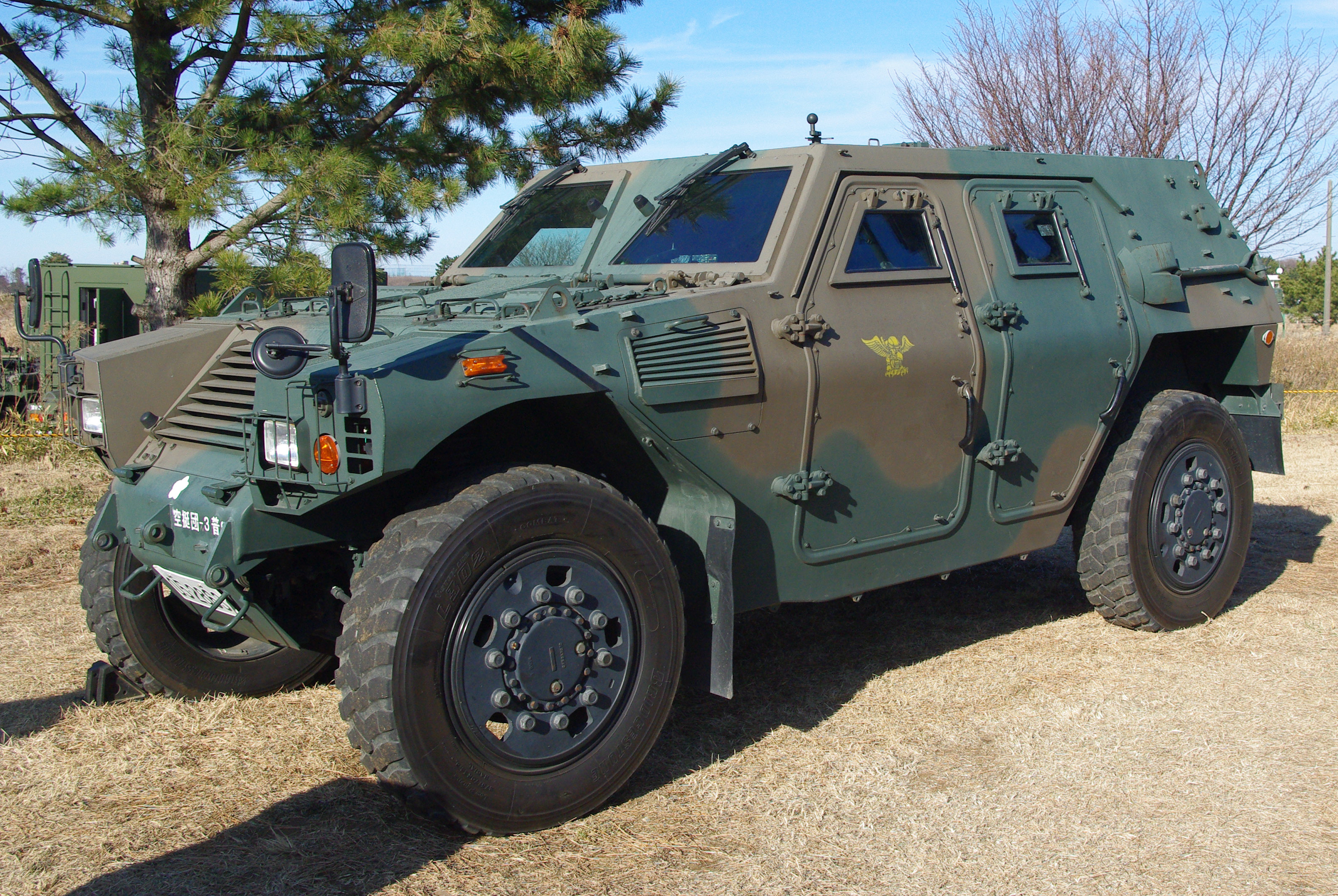
A Komatsu LAV (Light Armored Vehicle) on display with 1st Airborne Brigade (Japan) markings

== Sponsorships ==
On 5 February 2024 Williams Racing announced a "multi-year partnership" with the team, reigniting their previous partnership, which, among other things, saw Komatsu provide gearbox parts for the championship winning cars of the 1990s, the FW18 and FW19.

Komatsu branding is featured heavily on the team's 2024 car, the FW46, driver suits and team kit during the 2024 season.

== See also ==
- Hanomag – now a Komatsu subsidiary
- Type 60 self-propelled 106 mm recoilless gun (JGSDF)
- Komatsu LAV (JGSDF/JASDF)
- Type 89 infantry fighting vehicle (JGSDF)
- Type 96 armored personnel carrier (JGSDF)
