= List of equipment of the Bangladesh Army =

Bangladesh Army
- Insignia of the Bangladesh Army

The following is a list of equipment of the Bangladesh Army.

== Soldier gear and equipment ==
=== Service uniform ===
Name	Pattern	Uniform	Type	Origin	Notes
Military uniform
Battle Dress Uniform (BDU)			Woodland	Bangladesh	

=== Communication equipments ===
Name	Image	Type	Quantity	Origin	Notes
Manpack radio
Codan 2110M		Manpack radio	200	Australia	
VHF-90M		Manpack radio		Australia	
Sta R-173		VHF radio		Russia	Used in BTR-80
PRC-2080		Manpack radio		Australia	
PRC-2090		Manpack radio		Australia	
High frequency communication equipment
Radio relay system		Microwave radio relay			Used for secured communication during wartime.
Motorola VXR-9000U		Repeater Station		United States	
Leonardo MH-313X		Microwave radio relay		Italy	
CD-115E		Digital Switchboard		Portugal	
R-149MA3		Command and signals vehicle	10	Russia	

== Infantry weapons ==
=== Firearms ===
Name	Image	Caliber	Type	Origin	Notes
Pistols
Browning Hi Power		9×19mm Parabellum	Semi-automatic pistol	Belgium; United States	
CF98		9×19mm Parabellum	Semi-automatic pistol	China	
Type 54		7.62×25mm Tokarev	Semi-automatic pistol	China	
Bersa Thunder 9		9×19mm Parabellum	Semi-automatic pistol	Argentina	
Submachine guns
KRISS Vector Gen II		9×19mm Parabellum	Submachine gun	United States	Used by Special Forces
Heckler & Koch MP5		9×19mm Parabellum	Submachine gun	West Germany	Used by Special Forces
Assault rifles
BD-08		7.62×39mm	Assault rifle	Bangladesh; China	Standard-issue rifle. Produced under license by Bangladesh Ordnance Factories.
Type 56		7.62×39mm	Assault rifle	Bangladesh; China	Assembled locally at BOF
Carbine
M4 Carbine		5.56×45mm NATO	Selective fire carbine	United States	Used by Special Forces
Zastava M59/66		7.62×39mm	Semi-automatic carbine	Yugoslavia	Mainly used to fire the M60 rifle grenade.
Machine guns
BD-15		7.62×39mm	Light machine gun	Bangladesh; China	LMG variant of BD-08 assault rifle.
RPD		7.62×39mm	Light machine gun	Soviet Union	
Arsenal MG-1MS		7.62×54mm	General-purpose machine gun	Bulgaria	Bulgarian modernised version of the PKM machine gun.
Type 80		7.62×54mm	General-purpose machine gun	China	Chinese modernised version of the PKM machine gun.
Zastava M87		12.7×108mm	Heavy machine gun	Yugoslavia; Serbia	Serbian version of the NSV machine gun.
DShK		12.7×108mm	Heavy machine gun	Soviet Union	
Sniper rifle & DMR
Cyclone HSR		12.7x99mm NATO	Anti-materiel rifle	United Kingdom	HSR variant.
AX308		7.62×51mm NATO	Sniper rifle	United Kingdom	
SC-76 Thunderbolt		7.62×51mm NATO	Sniper rifle	United Kingdom	
RPA Rangemaster		7.62×51mm NATO	Sniper rifle	United Kingdom	Rangemaster 7.62 variant.
Dragunov sniper rifle		7.62×54mmR	Designated marksman rifle	Soviet Union; China	Chinese Type 85 variant.
Grenade-based weapons
Arges 84 BD			Fragmentation hand grenade	Bangladesh; Austria	Licensed version of Austrian ARGES HG-84, manufactured under license by Bangladesh Ordnance Factories.
STK 40 AGL		40x53mm grenade	Automatic grenade launcher	Singapore	
Milkor MGL		40×46mm grenade	Revolver grenade launcher	South Africa	Mk1
M60 rifle grenade		22 mm grenade	Rifle Grenade	Yugoslavia	M60P1 variant.

== Armored fighting vehicles ==
=== Combat tanks ===
Name	Image	Type	Quantity	Origin	Notes
Tanks
T-59 G (Durjoy)		Medium tank	174	Bangladesh; China	174 Type 59 tanks were upgraded to T-59 G (Durjoy) with kits from China in 2014–2019.
T-69 II G		Medium tank	58	China	58 T-69 IIM tanks upgraded to T-69 II G version with kits from China, first appeared in 2009.
MBT-2000		Main battle tank	44	China	
VT-5		Light tank	44+ upto 88 (sources vary)	China	

=== Armored vehicles ===
Name	Image	Type	Quantity	Origin	Notes
BTR 80		Armoured personnel carrier	645 plus/minus (sources vary)	Soviet Union	
MaxxPro		Mine-resistant ambush protected vehicle (MRAP)	81-141 (sources vary)	United States	
TATA MRAP		Mine-resistant ambush protected vehicle (MRAP)	11	India	
Otokar Cobra II		Infantry mobility vehicle / MRAP	152-213 (sources vary)	Turkey	
Otokar Cobra		Infantry mobility vehicle	36-44 (sources vary)	Turkey	
BOV M11		Armoured reconnaissance vehicle	8	Serbia	
Type 85 AFV		APC/Command vehicle	50	China	

=== Radars and fire control systems ===
Name	Image	Type	Quantity	Origin	Notes
Radar systems
SLC-2		Weapon locating radar	10	China	
Oerlikon Skyguard-3		Fire control radar	4-8 (sources vary)	Switzerland	Part of Oerlikon GDF-009 guns.
FM-90's radar		Fire control radar	6-12 (sources vary)	China	Part of FM-90 air defense system.
FW-2		Fire control radar	6	China	Part of CS/AA3 guns.

=== Engineering vehicles ===
Name	Image	Type	Quantity	Origin	Notes
Armoured recovery vehicle
Type 84		Armoured recovery vehicle	5	China	
Bomb disposal equipment
Bozena-5		Remote controlled mine clearing vehicle	1	Slovakia	
Dumper
Thwaites Dumper 2722E		Dumper		United Kingdom	
Forklift
TCM FD 50 T 8		Forklift		Japan	
Bulldozer
Caterpillar D4		Bulldozer		United States	D4C, D4K, D4G, D4E variant.
Caterpillar D6		Bulldozer		United States	D6R variant.
Caterpillar D7		Bulldozer		United States	D7R variant.
Caterpillar D8		Bulldozer		United States	D8R variant.
Excavator
Doosan Solar 210 W-V		Excavator		Republic of Korea	
Doosan Solar 200 W-V		Excavator		Republic of Korea	
Doosan DX-210WA		Excavator		Republic of Korea	
Road roller
HD 90		Tandem Roller		South Africa	
HD 70		Tandem Roller		South Africa	
Loader
Caterpillar 924HZ		Wheel Loader		United States	
Ahlmann AS 200		Wheel Loader		Netherlands	
Crane
GR-120NL		Crane		Japan	
GR-300EX		Crane		Japan	

=== Logistics and utility vehicles ===
Name	Image	Role	Quantity	Origin	Notes
Pickup truck
Land Rover Defender		Utility Vehicle		United Kingdom	Assembled by Bangladesh Machine Tools Factory.
KM 420		Utility Vehicle		Republic of Korea	
Mitsubishi Delica		Utility Vehicle		Japan	P15 and L300 series
Toyota Land Cruiser 70		Utility Vehicle		Bangladesh Japan	Assembled by Bangladesh Machine Tools Factory.
Ford Ranger		Utility Vehicle		United States Thailand	Currently produced in Thailand.
Toyota Hilux		Utility Vehicle		Japan	
Mitsubishi L200		Utility Vehicle		Japan	
Staff car
Nissan Patrol		Staff car		Japan	
Tata Hexa		Staff car	300	India	
Mitsubishi Pajero		Staff car		Japan	
Kia Cerato		Staff car		Republic of Korea	Kia Cerato EX variant.
4x4 truck
Isuzu TS/TW series		4x4 truck		Japan	HTS-11G and 11J variant.
Renault TRM 180.11		4x4 truck		France	
BMC-235-16		4x4 truck		Turkey	
Arunima Bolyan		4x4 truck		Bangladesh	
6x4 truck
Volvo FM		6x4 truck		Sweden	FM 400 variant.
Iveco EuroTrakker		6x4 truck		Italy	
Astra HD9		6x4 truck	38	Italy	
Renault Kerax 380.34T		6x4 truck	10	France	
Renault CBH		6x4 truck		France	CBH 320 variant.
6x6 truck
Tiema XC2200		6x6 truck		China	
Jiefang CA-30		6x6 truck		China	
Western Star		6x6 truck		Canada	
KamAZ-43118		6x6 truck		Russia	

== Air defence systems ==
Name	Image	Type	Quantity	Origin	Notes
Surface-to-air missile systems
FM-90		Short range air defense	6 systems	China	6 SAM systems with 18-36 launcher vehicles, each with 4 missile launch tubes.
Man-portable air-defense systems
QW-2 MANPADS		Man-portable air-defense system		China	
FN-16		Man-portable air-defense system		China	
QW-18A		Man-portable air-defense system		China	
Anti-aircraft guns
Type 65		37 mm autocannon	132	China	
Type 74		37 mm autocannon	132	China	Has fire-control radar stations.
Type 59		57 mm autocannon	34	China	
Oerlikon GDF		35 mm autocannon	4–8 (sources vary)	Switzerland	GDF-009 variant.
CS/AA3		35 mm autocannon		China	Chinese variant of the Oerlikon GDF.
Type 56		14.5 mm autocannon	Approx 300-500.	China	

== Artillery systems and rocket launchers ==
Name	Image	Caliber	Quantity	Origin	Notes
Multiple rocket launchers
WS-22		122 mm	49-162 (sources vary)	China	
TRG-300 Tiger		300 mm	18–36 (sources vary)	Turkey	
TRG-230		230 mm	18	Turkey	
Self-propelled artillery
Nora B-52		155 mm self-propelled howitzers	18-72 (sources vary)	Serbia	Serbia reported that the 6 Nora B-52 exported in 2013 were the K1 variant.
Towed artillery
Mod 56		105 mm pack howitzer	85-170 (sources vary)	Italy	
M-56 Howitzer		105 mm howitzer	56	Yugoslavia	M56A1 variant.
Type 59-1		130 mm field gun	62	China	Chinese version of Soviet M-46 gun.
Type 54		122 mm howitzer	57	China	
Type 96		122 mm howitzer	54	China	Chinese version of Soviet D-30 howitzer.
MKE Boran howitzer		105 mm Air transportable howitzer	18	Turkey	Turkish modernized version of L118 light gun.
M101		105 mm howitzer	50	United States	M101A1 variant. 50 delivered in 1982. Status uncertain.
Type 83		122 mm howitzer	20	China	Developed from Chinese Type 54 howitzer.

== Mortars ==
Name	Image	Caliber	Quantity	Origin	Notes
M50		120 mm	95	France	The UBM-52 is the Hotchkiss-Brandt MO-120-AM50 built under license in Yugoslavia.
UBM 52		120 mm	95	Yugoslavia	The UBM-52 is the Hotchkiss-Brandt MO-120-AM50 built under license in Yugoslavia.
Type 53		120 mm	50	People's Republic of China	
OFB E1		120 mm	18	India	
Type-87		82 mm	366	People's Republic of China	
M29A1		81 mm	11	United States	
BOF type-BD-20		60 mm		Bangladesh	60 mm Infantry mortar.
Type-93		60 mm	26	China	
Type-63		60 mm		People's Republic of China	

== Anti-tank weapons ==
Name	Image	Type	Quantity	Origin	Notes
Anti-tank guided missile systems
Metis-M1		Anti-tank missile	1200	Russia	
HJ-8/Baktar-Shikan		Anti-tank missile	283	People's Republic of China; Pakistan	114 delivered by China in 2001, 169 more delivered by Pakistan in 2004 according to the Stockholm International Peace Research Institute.
PF-98		Unguided anti-tank rocket launcher		People's Republic of China	
Alcotán-100		PLOS assisted anti-tank rocket launcher system		Spain	
Type-69		Rocket-propelled grenade		People's Republic of China	
M40		Recoilless rifle	238	United States	M40A1 variant. Replaced by PF-98 from active duty.

== Aircraft of aviation group ==
Aircraft	Image	Type	Quantity	Origin	Notes
Fixed-wing aircraft
Cessna 152 Aerobat		Light aircraft	5	United States	A152 Aerobat variant.
DA40NG		Basic trainer	4	Austria	Two more on order.
Airbus C-295W		Transport aircraft	2	Spain	
Cessna 208B Grand Caravan		Utility aircraft	1	United States	
Helicopters
Mi-171Sh		Transport helicopter with armed assault capabilities	5-6 (sources vary)	Russia	
Eurocopter AS365 Dauphin		Utility helicopter	2	France	AS365 N3+ variant
Bell 407 GXi		Utility helicopter	2	United States	5 on order
Bell 206		Utility helicopter	1	United States	
Unmanned aerial vehicle
Bramor C4EYE		Reconnaissance drone	36	Slovenia	Procured in 2017.
Bayraktar TB2		Unmanned combat aerial vehicle	6	Turkey	
RQ-21 Blackjack		Unmanned aerial vehicle		United States	

== Watercraft of Riverine Brigade ==
Name	Image	Type	Quantity	Origin	Notes
Amphibious warfare ship
Type C (2012) class		LCVP	2	Bangladesh	Built by Khulna Shipyard. Specifications:- length: 19.85 m, breadth: 7 m, maximum speed: 15 knots.
Shakti Sanchar		LCT	1	Bangladesh	Designed by GB Marine. Specifications:- length: 65.70, breadth: 7 m, deadweight: 440 MT. The LCT is capable of carrying 1 helicopter, 9 tanks and 150 troops.
BS Jahangir		LCT	1	China Bangladesh	One Type 074 built by the People's Republic of China exists in the Bangladesh Army fleet.
High speed boat
Kingfisher-29		High speed patrol boat	60	Canada	
Metal Shark Boat		High speed interceptor boat	3	United States	5 more on order.
Sea Horse-13		High speed interceptor boat	2	Bangladesh	Made by METACENTRE ltd.

== See also ==
- Bangladesh Army Aviation Group
- Bangladesh Naval Aviation
