= Equipment of the Border Guard Bangladesh =

Border Guards Bangladesh

The following is a list of the equipment currently in use by the Border Guards Bangladesh. It includes small arms, vehicles, vessels and aircraft.

== Small arms ==
| Name | Image | Type | Notes | Caliber |
|---|---|---|---|---|
| Bersa Thunder 9 | | Semi-automatic pistol | | 9×19mm Parabellum |
| Type 56 carbine | | Semi-automatic Carbine | Produced under license by BOF. Standard-issue rifle of BGB. Gradually being replaced by BD-08 and Type-56 assault rifles. | 7.62×39mm |
| BD-08 | | Assault rifle | Produced under license by BOF. | 7.62×39mm |
| Type 56 assault rifle | | Assault rifle | | 7.62×39mm |
| Type 85 | | Sniper rifle | | 7.62×54mmR |
| BD-15 | | Light machine gun | LMG variant of BD-08 assault rifle. | 7.62×39mm |
| RPD | | Light machine gun | | 7.62×39mm |

== Anti-tank weapons ==
| Name | Image | Type | Caliber | Quantity |
|---|---|---|---|---|
| RK-3 Corsar | | Anti-tank guided missile | 107mm | 500 ATGM |
| Alcotán-100 | | PLOS based anti-tank rocket launcher | 100mm | 500 ATGM |

== Utility vehicles ==
| Name | Image | Type | Quantity | Notes |
|---|---|---|---|---|
| Polaris ATVs | | ATV | 500 | Used for off-road patrolling. |
| KrAZ-Spartan | | Armoured Personnel Carrier | 200 | |
| Otokar Cobra | | Infantry mobility vehicle | 250 | |

== Aircraft ==
| Name | Image | Type | Quantity | Notes |
|---|---|---|---|---|
| Mi-171E | | Helicopter | 2 | 2 in active service from 2020. |
| Matrice 350 RTK | | Quadcopter | | |

== Vessels ==
| Name | Image | Type | Quantity | Notes |
|---|---|---|---|---|
| BGB Shah Jalal | | Coastal Patrol Vessel | 1 | |
| High speed interceptor vessel | | Interceptor Vessel | 40 | Received in 2020. The vessels are capable of navigating in inclement weather and are equipped with machine gun, radar, fourth generation GPS, and modern sonar system. |

== See also ==
- Bangladesh Armed Forces
- List of equipment of the Bangladesh Army
