= Traxcavator =

Traxcavator was a namebrand of the Trackson Company of Milwaukee, Wisconsin. The word "Traxcavator" came from combining "tractor" and "excavator".

== Overview ==
Trackson commenced business in Milwaukee in 1922 and initially built tracked attachments primarily for Fordson tractors, then later built tracked attachments for other tractor manufacturers. The early Trackson tracked attachments were popular on tractors used for road grader power units, as well as for tractors used on poor ground conditions.

== Expansion ==
The Trackson company was owned by Armand Lamfrom Froehlich (1895-1951), and the chief engineer was Walter Stiemke. Sometime in the early 1930s, Walter Stiemke recognized the potential of combining the Trackson track system with the Lessman Manufacturing Company lifting mechanism, for digging or excavating.

Stiemke convinced the owner of Trackson, Armand Lamfrom Froehlich (1895-1951), to buy the Lessman Manufacturing Co to pursue a marriage of the two systems - for the machine sales opportunity, as well as the earthmoving work - that Stiemke felt was possible by combining the two systems.

Trackson designed a cable lift shovel in 1936, for a tractor built by Caterpillar Inc. In 1937, Caterpillar announced the "Trackson Shovel option" for the Caterpillar Thirty (6G series - later known as the R4). By 1938, Trackson had produced a revised cable shovel model, known as the T4, fitted to the Caterpillar D4 tractor.

Within a few years, there were 4 Trackson cable loaders or shovels available, all based on Caterpillar crawlers. The T2 Trackson cable shovel was fitted to the Caterpillar D2 - the T4 to the Cat D4 - the T6 to the Cat D6 - and the T7, fitted to the Cat D7. The crawler tractors were modified for Trackson shovel use by being fitted with longer trackframes, to assist with stability when the bucket was being carried at a height. Sometime in the mid-1940s, the name "Traxcavator" was coined by the Trackson company for their cable shovel machines.

Trackson, in the 1940s, also built pipelayers on Caterpillar tractors and other attachments such as truck mounted cranes and shovels.

In 1948, collaboration between Caterpillar engineers and Trackson engineer saw the development of the HT4 Trackson hydraulic shovel. This was an all-new hydraulic shovel-loader design, integrated with the current model D4 tractor. The HT4 sold alongside the cable Traxacavators, until 1952, when the cable Traxcavator line ceased production.

== Takeover ==
In December 1951 the Caterpillar Company purchased the Trackson Company, and the cable Traxcavators and the HT4, became Caterpillar Traxcavators.

In late 1952, the all-new No.6 Caterpillar Shovel was announced by Caterpillar, and cable Traxcavator production ceased. The Caterpillar HT4 and No.6 Shovel were the only hydraulic Traxcavators available from Caterpillar until the all-new 933, 955 and 977 made their appearance in early 1955. The name "Traxcavator" was a registered Caterpillar brand name for many years, but has developed into common usage to describe any tracked shovel/loader.

== See also ==
- Bulldozer
- Crawler tractor
- Excavator
