= Defence industry of Bangladesh =

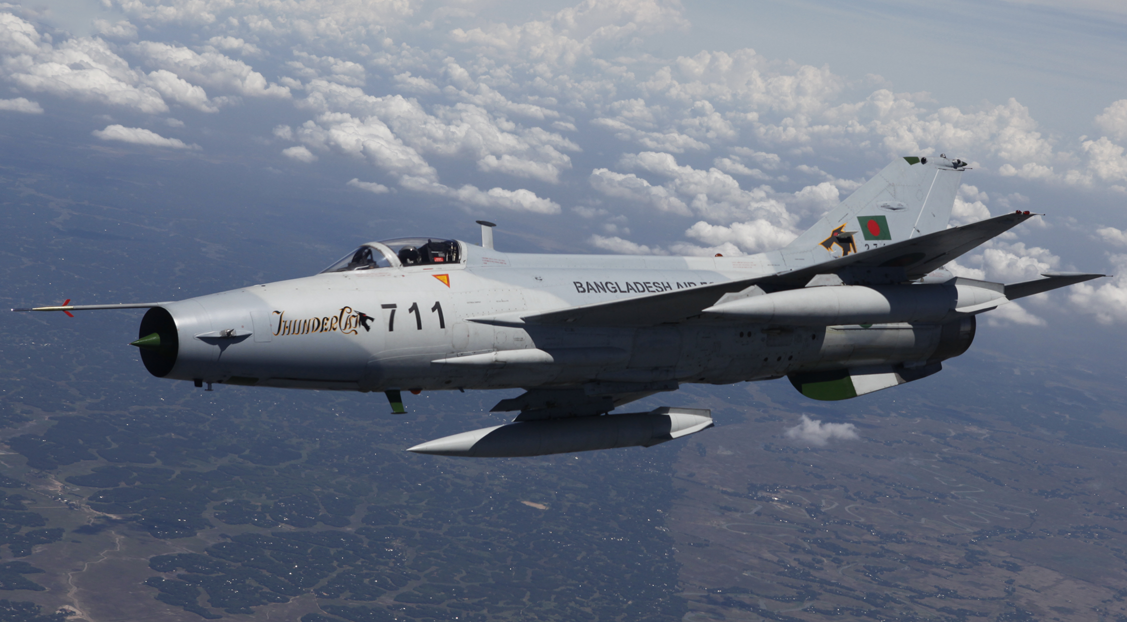
Bangladesh Air Force F-7BGi inflight

The defence industry of Bangladesh is a strategically important sector and a large employer in Bangladesh.The Government of Bangladesh is actively seeking to upgrade its military and security capabilities and has allocated increasing amounts to its defense and security-related budget.

The Directorate General of Defense Procurement (DGDP) manages procurements for the Ministry of Defense and the various armed forces, including the Army, Navy, and Air Force. Tenders for security and defense equipment and services are frequently open only to international bidders. Low pricing remains an issue for U.S. bidders, especially for items that can be procured regionally. In 2002, China and Bangladesh signed a "Defence Cooperation Agreement" which covers military training and defence production.

== Future modernization plans ==
Bangladesh has made a long term modernisation plan for its Armed Forces named Forces Goal 2030. The plan includes the modernization and expansion of all equipment and infrastructures and providing enhanced training.

== Military budget ==
An amount of Tk348.42 billion ($4.4 billion) was proposed for the Defence Ministry in the national budget for outgoing fiscal year 2022.

- Bangladesh Army – $1.97 billion (৳16817 crore)
- Bangladesh Navy – $742.78 million (৳6330 crore)
- Bangladesh Air Force – $474.3 million (৳556.56 crore)

== Major manufacturers ==
- Bangladesh Aeronautical Centre
- Bangladesh Machine Tools Factory
- Bangladesh Ordnance Factories
- Chittagong Dry Dock Limited
- Dockyard and Engineering Works Limited
- Khulna Shipyard
