= Caterpillar D4 =

Small bulldozer

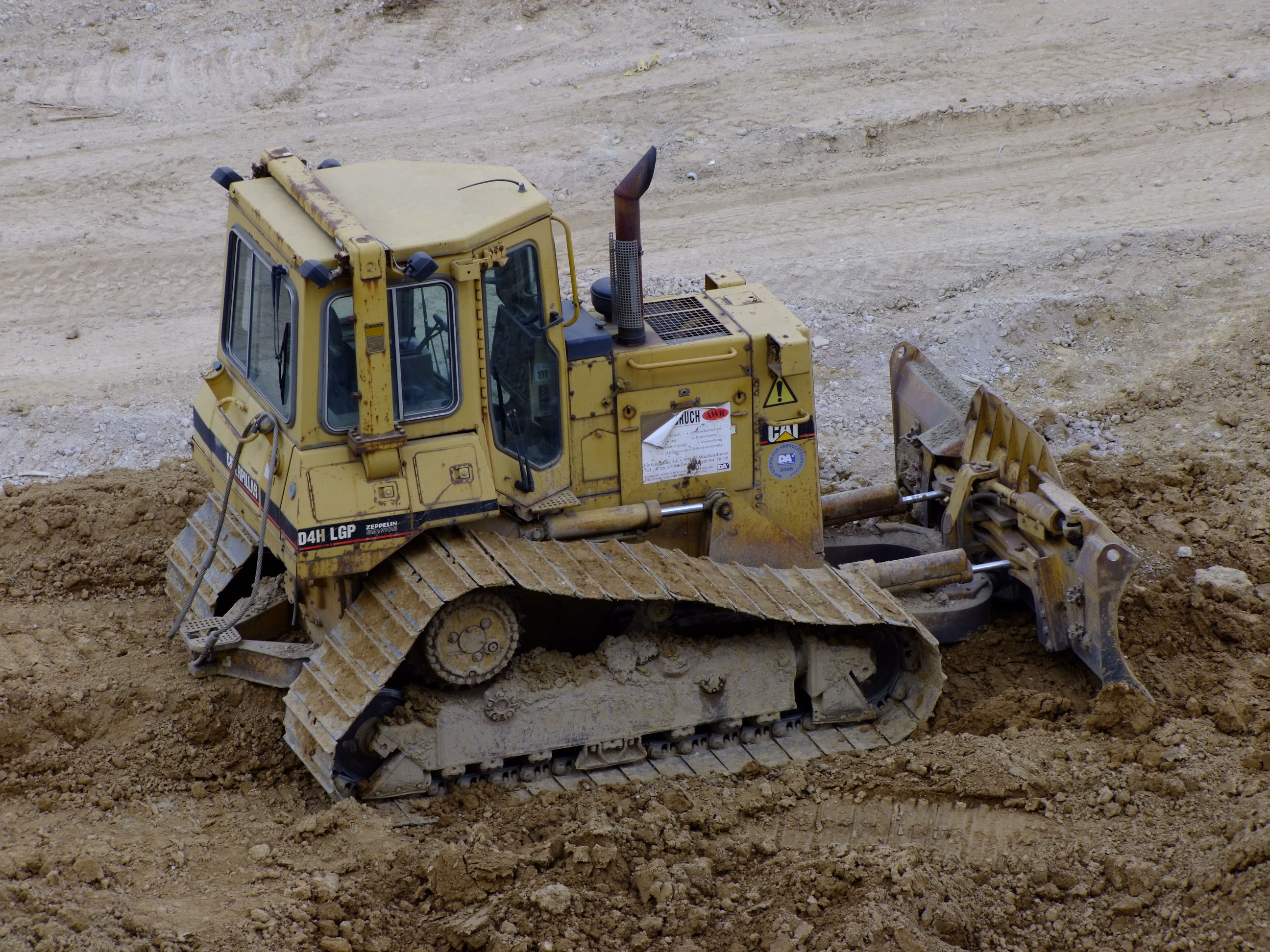
Caterpillar D4H LGP (Low Ground Pressure) model, Eschborn, Germany.

The Caterpillar D4 track-type tractor is a small bulldozer manufactured by Caterpillar Inc.

Caterpillar first introduced the RD4 in 1936, as the diesel follow on to the successful CAT 30 gas model. The first RD4 weighed 10,000 pounds (4,500 kg), and used Caterpillar's D4400 engine, an inline four-cylinder, with a 4.25 by 5.50 inches (108 mm × 140 mm) bore and stroke. In 1935 Caterpillar had started the naming convention of "RD" for diesel or "R" for regular gasoline, followed by a number to indicate the relative engine size. In 1937, the "RD" models began to be called just "D" models. At the time of introduction of the RD4, the D4400 engine produced about 43 horsepower (32 kW) at the drawbar so the 4 was a relative indicator of engine power. The D4 U series was fitted with the more powerful D315 engine, and later engines used in the D4 brought further increases in power, but the number "4" was retained – indicating the tractor's position in the Caterpillar line-up rather than indicating engine power.

== Version details ==
- 6U = Narrow gauge 44 in (1,100 mm)
- 7U = Wide Gauge 60 in (1,500 mm)
- Caterpillar RD4 - 1936-37 (4G) with 4-cylinder D4400 engine
- Caterpillar D4 - 1937-39 (4G) with 4-cylinder D4400 engine
- Caterpillar D4 - 1939-43 (7J) with 4-cylinder D4400 engine
- Caterpillar D4 - 1943-45 (2T) with 4-cylinder D4400 engine
- Caterpillar D4 - 1945-47 (5T) with 4-cylinder D4400 engine
- Caterpillar D4 - 1947-59 6U1 > 6U12781, 7U1-7U44307 Cat 4-cylinder D315 engine.
- Caterpillar D4C - 1959-63
- Caterpillar D4D - 1963-77
- Caterpillar D4E - 1977-84
- Caterpillar D4H - 1985-96
- Caterpillar D4C SII -1990-93
- Caterpillar D4C SIII - 1993

=== Tracked shovels ===
The Caterpillar D4 was used as the base tractor for the Trackson built loader that was known as the T4 or Traxcavator shovel.

== See also ==
- Caterpillar D5
- Caterpillar D3
- Caterpillar D2
- Heavy equipment
- G-numbers Army cats.
- TM 9-2800 military vehicles
- SNL G151 light tractor
