= Q-MAC Electronics =

Australian electronics manufacturer

Q-MAC Electronics Pty Ltd
- Industry: Communications, frequency hopping, & electronics products
- Founded: 1995
- Headquarters: Perth, Western Australia
- Products: Tactical communications equipment (VHF tactical radios)
- Website: www.barrettcommunications.com.au

Q-MAC Electronics Pty Ltd was founded in 1995 and for 14 years were a manufacturer and supplier of HF and VHF tactical communications equipment. In 2009 Q-MAC was acquired by Barrett Communications, who have continued the development of the VHF range of equipment.

== VHF radio communications ==
Barrett Communications have continued to develop the VHF radio communications equipment, including transceivers (manpack, mobile and base), rebroadcast systems and accessories. The VHF solutions are typically used by military organisations and in particular are popular where compact units are required. The transceivers are designed to comply with military standards.

== Awards ==
Q-MAC was the 2005 National Australian Exporter of the year awards in Small to Medium Manufacturers category.
