= Caterpillar 924G =

Small size wheel loader

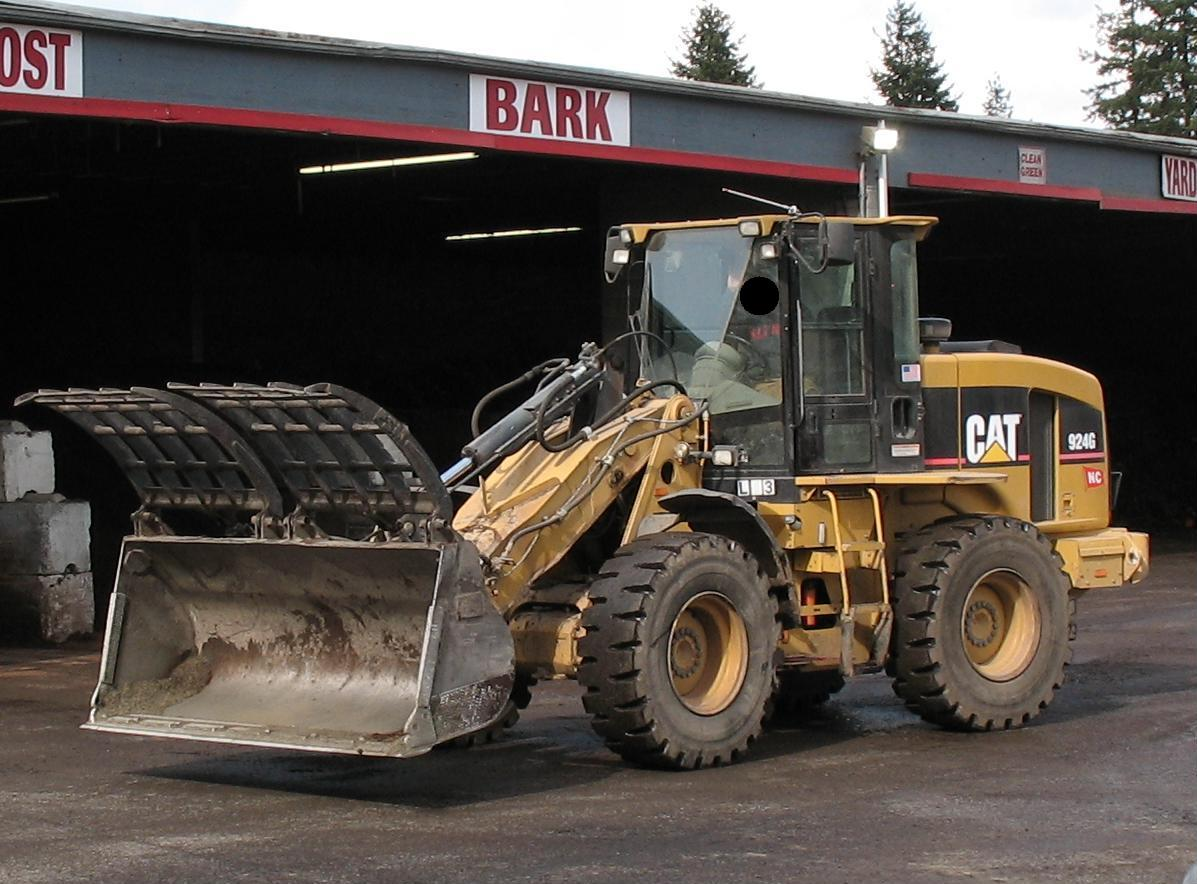

Caterpillar 924G is a small size wheel loader manufactured by Caterpillar Inc. Introduced in the year 2000, it remained in production until 2008. It weighs up to 11,340 kilograms (25,000 lb) and is powered by a 6L 137 hp (102 kW) 3056E engine. The Caterpillar 924G is the first loader in the nine-twenty-four series to feature the Versalink 1 piece boom, which offers greater strength and superior visibility for the operator compared to early designs. The 924G was replaced by the 924H in 2008.
