= SC-76 Thunderbolt =

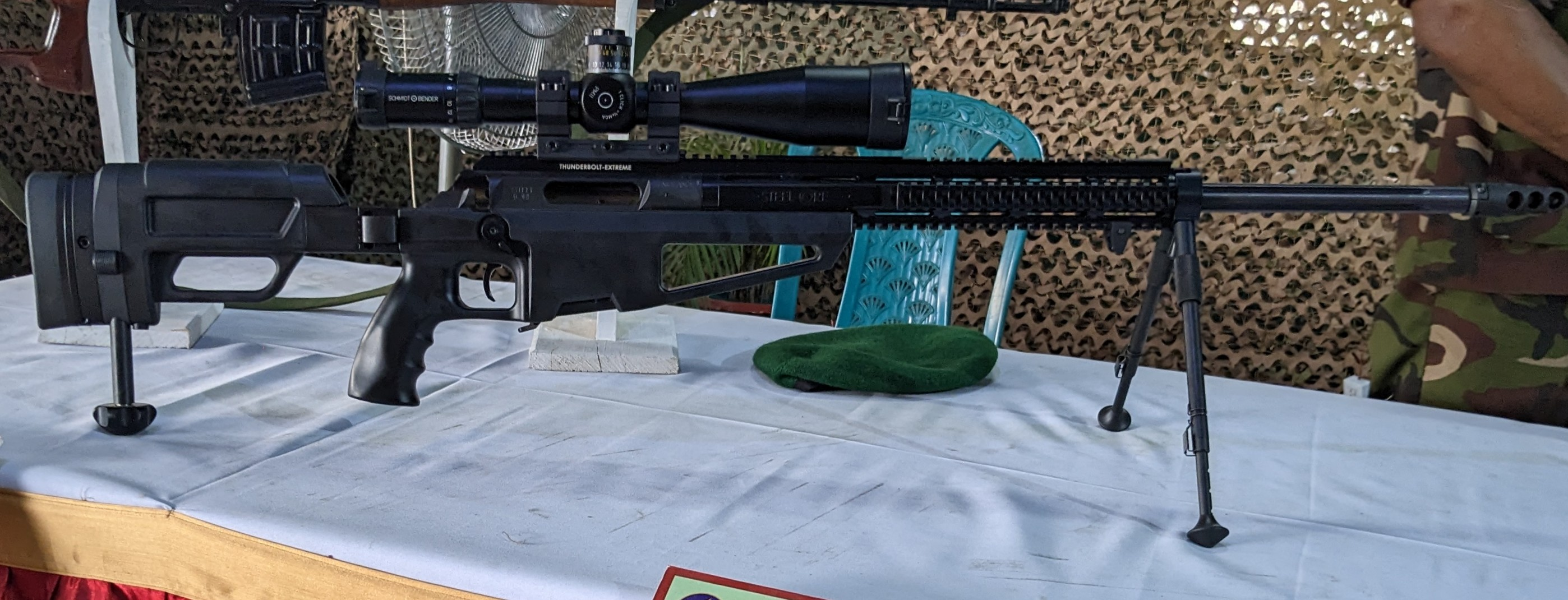
- SC-76 Thunderbolt of the Bangladesh Army on display.
- Type: Sniper rifle
- Place of origin: United Kingdom

Service history
- Used by: Bangladesh Army

Production history
- Designer: Steel Core Designs
- Manufacturer: Steel Core Designs
- Variants: SC-86 - 8.6×70mm (.338 Lapua Magnum); SC-127 - 12.7×99mm (.50 BMG)

Specifications
- Mass: 7.14 kg
- Length: Short barrel (SB) length - 41" (104 cm); Long barrel (LB) length - 47” (121 cm)
- Cartridge: 7.62×51mm
- Action: Bolt-action
- Effective firing range: Short Barrel: 600 m (656 yd); Long Barrel: 1,000 m (1,094 yd)
- Feed system: 10-round detachable box magazine
- Sights: Tactical day scope & rings, Night vision & LADS, Infra-red & TI sight

The SC-76 Thunderbolt is a bolt-action sniper rifle manufactured by British company Steel Core Designs. It feeds from a detachable box magazine which holds 10 rounds of either .308 Winchester, or more commonly, 7.62x51mm NATO. It costs between $14500 and $15230 per unit and is sold on both the civilian and military markets.

Simon Schofield, head of the Security and Defence Division of the Humanitarian Intervention Centre, has described the rifle as "a serious bit of counterterrorism gear and built to be a bit civilian friendly”.

== Design ==
The SC-76 is designed primarily for police and military use, and to maximise accuracy, reliability under adverse conditions, as well as user ergonomics. It has a 600mm Picatinny rail, a match grade barrel, fitted with a muzzle brake.

The sniper rifle can be equipped with either an adjustable bipod and monopod. The SC-76 has a polymer stock and a two-stage trigger

== User ==
- Bangladesh: Bangladesh Army.
- Pakistan: SSG, SSGN.

== See also ==
- Cyclone Rifle
