= Caterpillar D5 =

Small track-type bulldozer

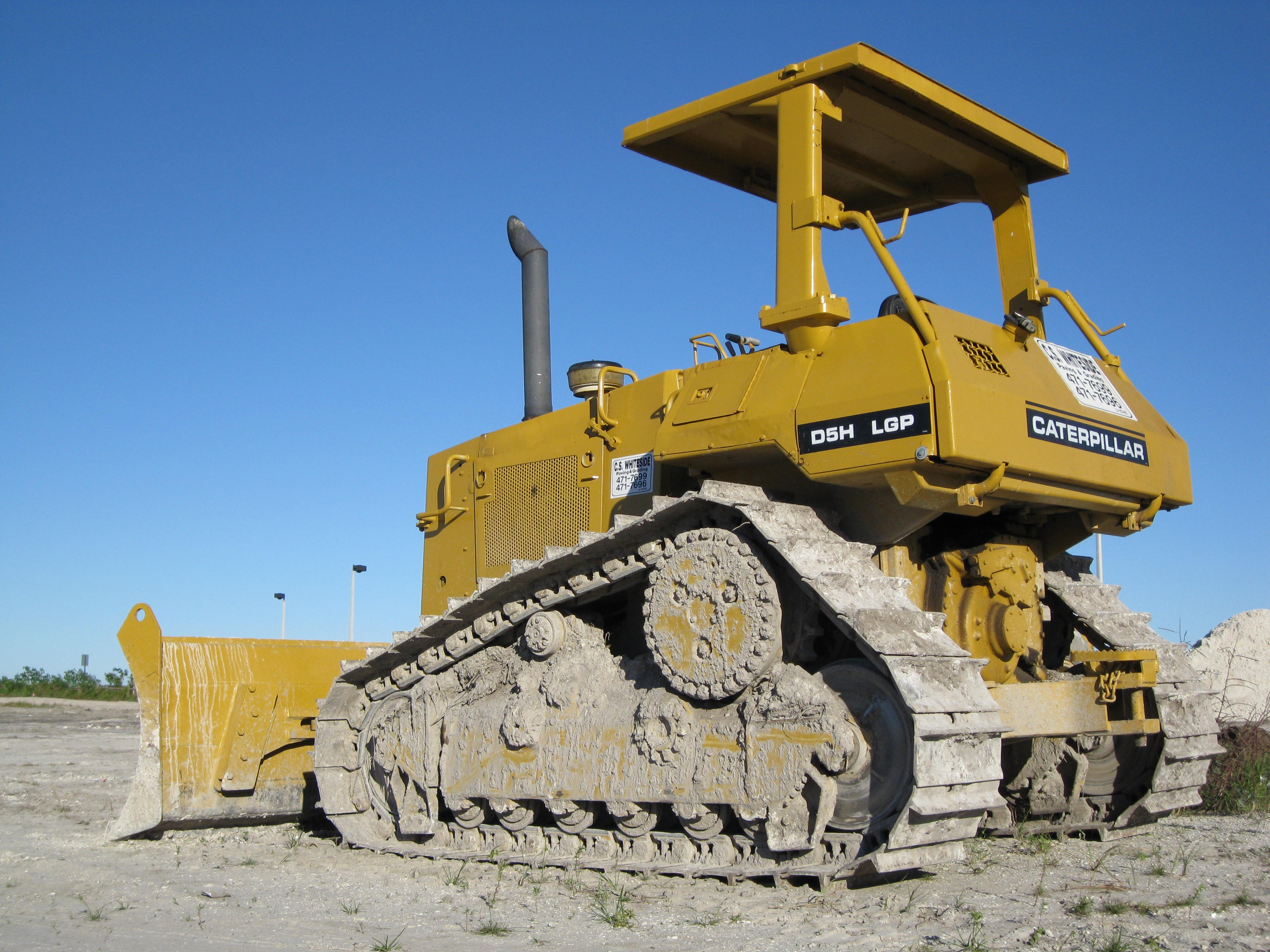
A Caterpillar D5H parked on a construction site in South Florida.

The Caterpillar D5 is a small track-type bulldozer manufactured by Caterpillar Inc. The original D5 series was only produced in 1939. The current D5 series being produced is the D5K.

== Versions ==
- D5 (9M) was originally built in 1939, with only 46 built. It was a cross between the D4 chassis and the 6-cylinder D6 45 horsepower (34 kW) D4600 engine.
- D5 - reintroduced in 1967.
- D5B - 1977
- D5 SA - Special Application agricultural tractor
- D5H, an elevated sprocket model introduced in 1985.
- D5H LGP - Low ground pressure version with wide & long tracks, for soft ground
- D5E 1993-1999
- D5H larger version D5 elevated sprocket 1986-1996
- D5M larger version D5 elevated "high" sprocket 1996-2003
- D5N larger version elevated sprocket 2003-2006
- D5N was replaced with the D6K low drive hystat dozer, becoming the D4 in 2021
- D5 D5LGP (current version) released in 2019, as a replacement for the D6N. High drive power shift dozer.
- The following models originated with the MHI (Mitsubishi Heavy Industries) partnership, providing smaller, low drive dozers, in the 20,000 lb range.
- D5C 1992-2002 low drive power shift, then hystat dozer
- D5G hydrostatic drive 2001
- D5K and D5K2 — 2020
- D3 (current version) replaced the D5K2, 2020

Over the years, Caterpillar often built different series of D5s at the same time, often with a lighter version having more in common with the smaller D3 and D4 tractors, and a larger version more akin to the much larger D6. Usually, the differentiation had to do with whether the machine incorporated an elevated or high sprocket drive. And later, this also determined the type of transmission used, with the smaller series using a hydrostatic drive and the larger version typically having a Power-Shift transmission. These varying series have created some confusion with lineage, as the letter designation does not always correspond to when the model of machine was introduced. For example, the D5H came out years before the D5C. Caterpillar has now turned to a straight number designation (no letters) for all of its new track-laying tractors — starting, for the first time, with the D-1 and going all the way up to the D-11, with consistent size and weight breaks between each model. This new designation has now put the current D5's weight at close to 43,000 pounds (20,000 kg). This is a considerable increase over any previous D5 models. The heavier, elevated versions of these could weigh 34,000 pounds (15,000 kg). At most, or as little as 20,000–25,000 pounds (9,100–11,300 kg). For some of the lighter series, such as the D5C. Consequently, the all-new D5 is much larger than any of the earlier versions.

== D5K Specifications ==
=== Engine ===
- Gross Power: 74.5 kW (100 hp)
- Net Power: 71.6 kW (96 hp)
- Bore: 105 millimetres (4.1 in)
- Weight: 15,000 kilograms (33,000 lb), approx.

=== Weights ===
- XL Operating weight: 9408 kg (20,741 lb)
- LGP Operating weight: 9683 kg (21,347 lb)

== See also ==
- Heavy equipment
- Caterpillar D6
- Caterpillar D4
