= Caterpillar D6 =

Medium bulldozer

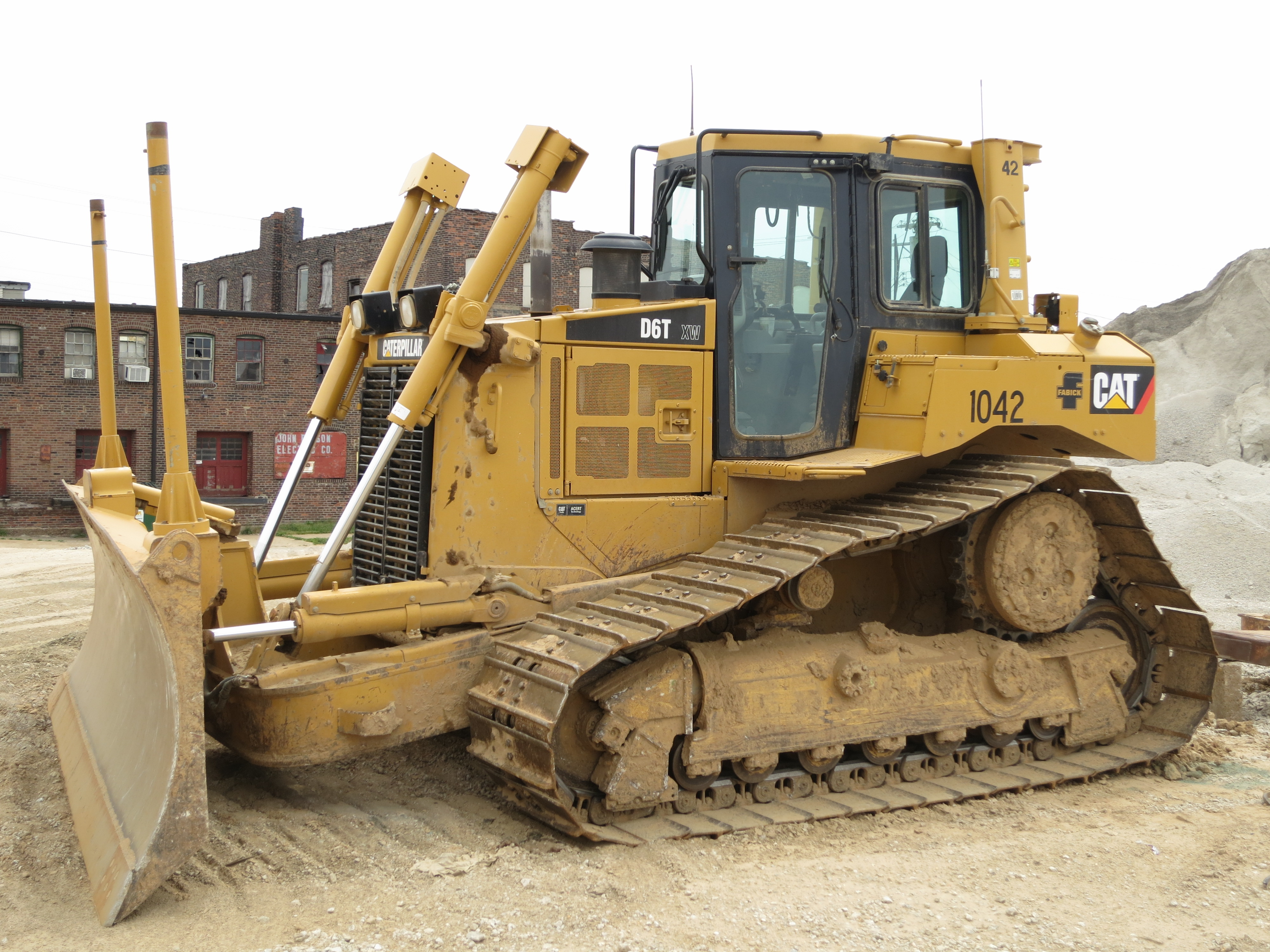
A Caterpillar D6T in St. Louis

The Caterpillar D6 track-type tractor is a medium bulldozer manufactured by Caterpillar Inc. with a nominal operating weight of 18 short tons (16 t). The military versions were classified as the SNL G152 medium tractor, under the G-numbers classification system used for army tractors.

== D6 version history ==
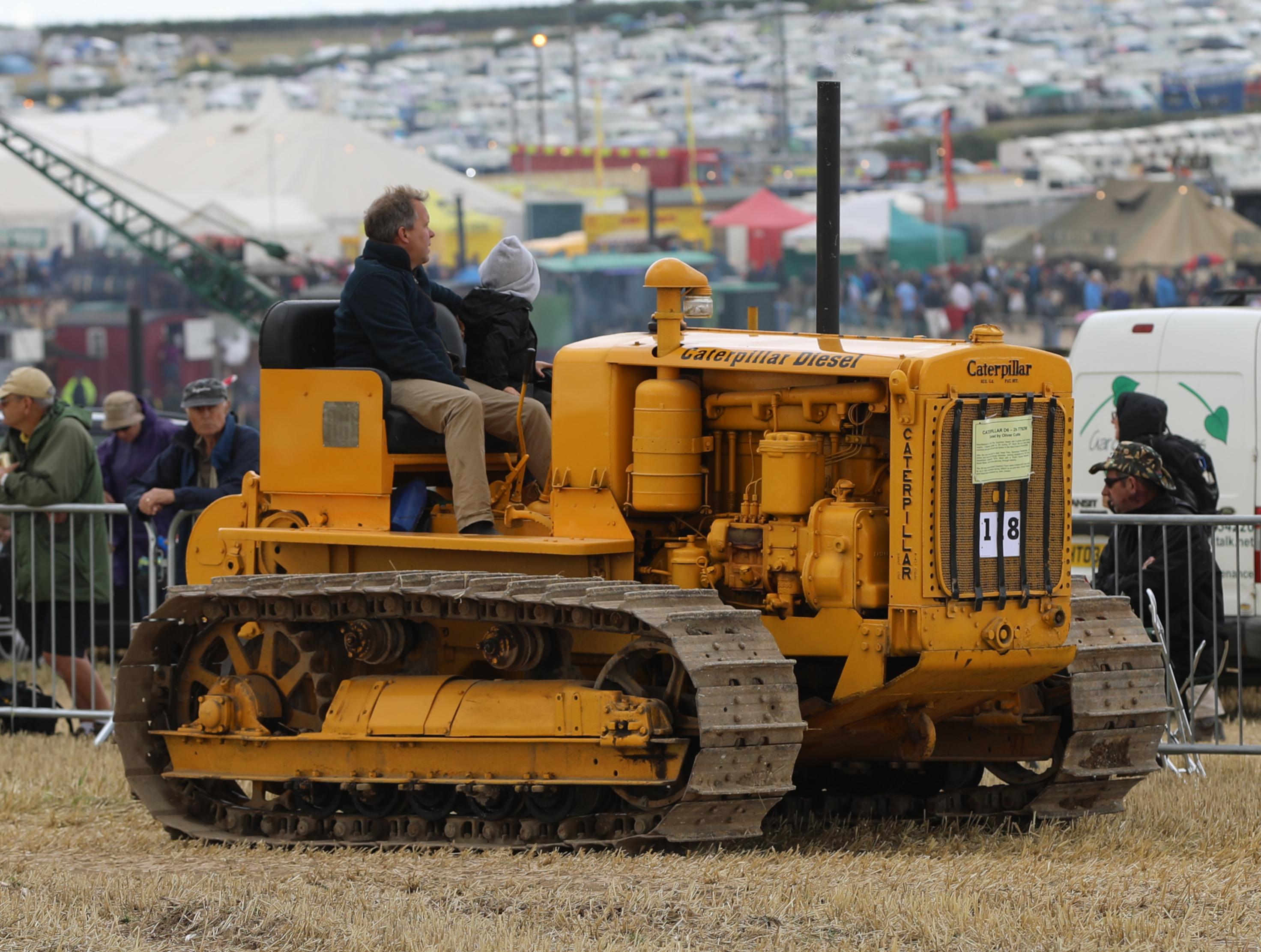
A 1940 D6

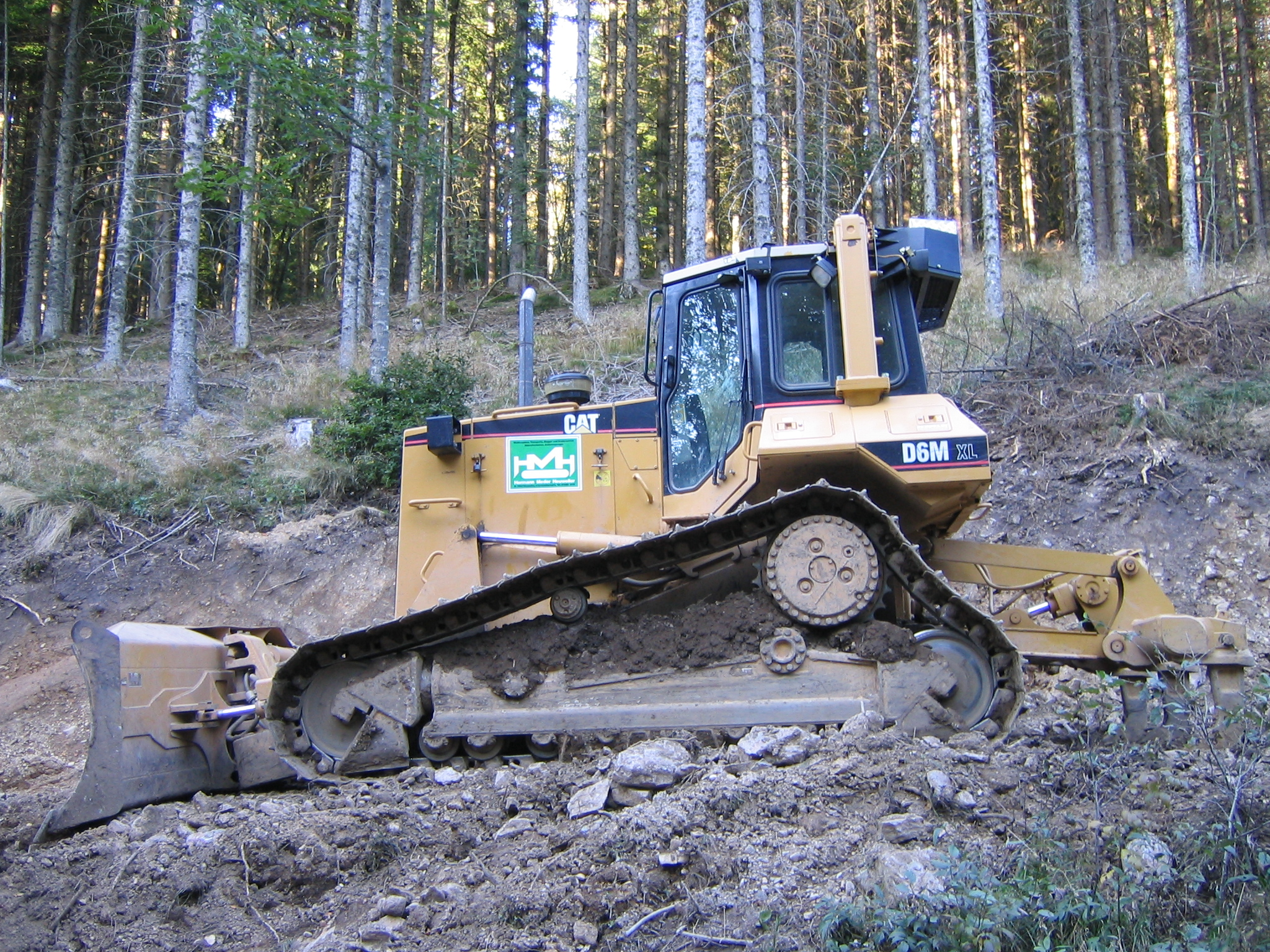
Caterpillar D6M with ripper engaged

The D6 started out in 1935 as the RD6, fitted with a 3-cylinder 45 hp (34 kW) D6600 engine. The RD6 was renamed D6 in 1937. Caterpillar introduced an entirely new D6 in 1941 with the 4R and 5R series, powered by the D4600 engine of 55 hp (41 kW) (drawbar).

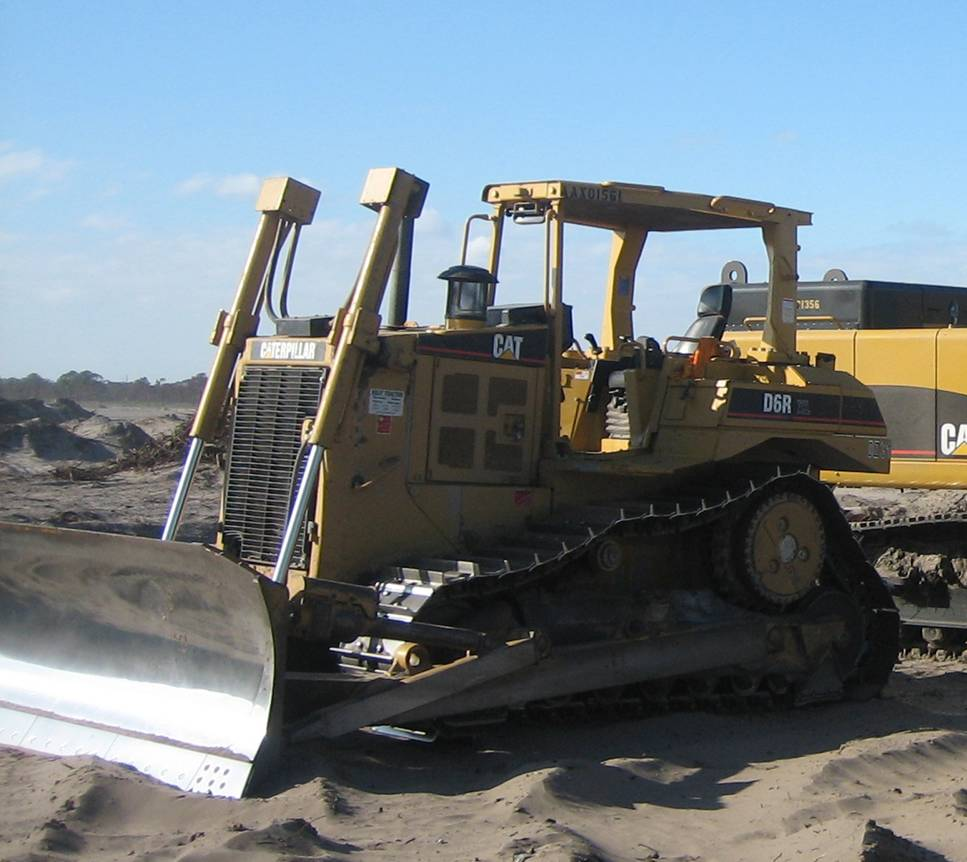
A Caterpillar D6R with Power Angle Tilt blade

- The D6 4R and 5R were replaced by the D6 8U and 9U series, fitted with the 6-cylinder D318 engine of 66 hp (49 kW) in 1947.
- In 1959 the D6 was replaced with the D6B after 60,000 D6 4R/5R and 8U/9U tractors had been built.
- In 1963 the D6C was introduced.
- In 1977 the D6D with a 140 hp (100 kW) engine was introduced, as well as the D6D SA version with 125 hp (93 kW) (drawbar) for agricultural use.
- The D6H was introduced in 1986 along with 3 other H-Series track-type tractors. This was the first D6 with Caterpillar's elevated drive sprocket undercarriage.
- The D6R replaced the D6H in 1996, and came in five models ranging from the 165 hp (123 kW) D6R to the 175 hp (130 kW) D6R XL and XR, and the 185 hp (138 kW) D6R XL (IG) and D6R LGP. All used the Cat 3306T 6-cylinder engine.
- The D6M XL and D6M LGP versions with 140 hp (100 kW) weighed 33,200 and 36,400 pounds (15,100 and 16,500 kg). Respectively, closer to the older D6C and D6D. Both used the Cat 3116T engine.
- Since 1996 the D6K at 125 hp (93 kW) and 28,409 pounds (12,886 kg), the D6N at 150 hp (110 kW) and 36,497 pounds (16,555 kg) and the D6T at 165 hp (123 kW) at 46,690 pounds (21,180 kg) all have been introduced.

=== Dozer blades ===
The dozer blade on the front of the tractor can come in different varieties:

- A straight blade ("S-Blade") which is short and has no lateral curve, no side wings, and can be used for fine grading.
- A universal blade ("U-Blade") which is tall and very curved, and has large side wings to carry more material.
- An "S-U" combination blade which is shorter, has less curvature, and smaller side wings.
- A Power Angle Tilt ("PAT") blade is a straight blade which has the ability to change the angle of the blade from side to side as well as the ability to hydraulically raise, tilt and angle the blade. This configuration is typically used in fine grading applications.

=== Rear equipment ===
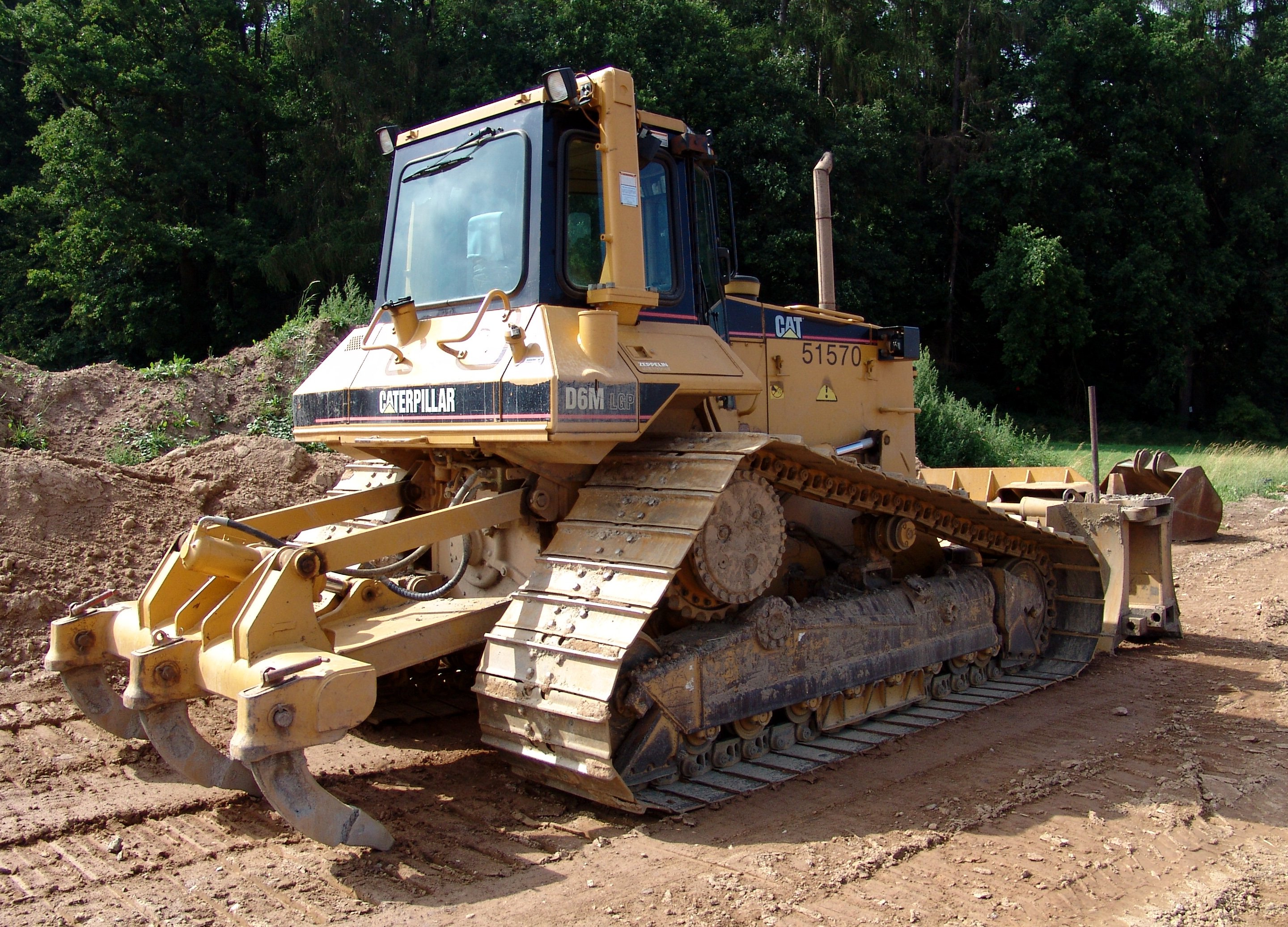
Caterpillar D6M with a multi-shank ripper

The rear of the machine can be outfitted with various tools:

- The rear of the machine can have large slabs of steel to add weight to the rear of the machine to aid in heavy dozing applications.
- A drawbar and CCU (Cable control unit) for pulling towed scrapers and trailed implements; later models now use hydraulics in place of the CCU to operate scrapers.
- A hydraulic winch can be outfitted on the rear of the machine for towing or pulling; for forestry work, usually with a lighter front blade as well, for pushing the brush and trees about.
- A ripper with a single or multiple shanks can be added to the rear of the machine to break up hard soil or rock.
- Fitted with a linkage (three-point hitch) for use in agriculture with mounted implements like plows.

The crawler tractor is powerful, yet small and light, weighing 16 to 20 tons (18 to 23 short tons) depending on configuration. This makes it ideal for working on very steep slopes, in forests, and for backfilling pipelines safely without risking damage to the pipe.

A low ground pressure version is also available with extra wide tracks to provide low ground pressure which allows working in muddy areas without sinking.

== See also ==
- Civil engineering
- Heavy equipment
- Caterpillar D7
- Caterpillar D5
