= Bangladesh Machine Tools Factory =

Bangladeshi defence company

- Emblem of Bangladesh Machine Tools Factory
- Founded: February 11, 1979; 47 years ago
- Type: State owned
- Location: Gazipur, Dhaka, Bangladesh
- Products: Specialized automobiles for military purpose, automobile parts, electronics
- Owner: Bangladesh Army
- Managing Director: Major General Naheed Asgar
- Budget: ৳ 160.8M BDT
- Website: bmtf.com.bd

Bangladesh Machine Tools Factory Limited (BMTF) is a commercial enterprise managed by the Bangladesh Army. It has 19 dynamic factories engaged in manufacturing a total of 566 products. It is located at Gazipur, about 40 km from Dhaka.

== History ==
East Pakistan Machine Tools Factory Limited was established in 1967. After the independence of Bangladesh, the factory started renewed operations on 11 February 1979 as a state-owned company. In 1996, the factory was closed due to poor financial performance. On 27 July 2000, Prime Minister Sheikh Hasina handed over the closed factory to the Bangladesh Army, which restarted it under the Bangladesh Machine Tools Factory name.

On 28 February 2005, Bangladesh Machine Tools Factory Limited signed an agreement with Pacific Motors Limited to assemble Nissan-branded cars at the factory. They will be assisted by Nissan Diesel Motor Company Limited. The factory announced it had made a profit of 60.3 million taka in February 2005.

Bangladesh Machine Tools Factory started manufacturing shoes in August 2007 and was inaugurated by Moeen U Ahmed, Chief of Army Staff of the Bangladesh Army. The factory manufactures military boots, sneakers, and formal shoes.

The government of Bangladesh awarded a contract to Bangladesh Machine Tools Factory Limited to supply Radio Frequency Identification (RFID) tags and special plates for the Bangladesh Road Transport Authority in 2009 and made it mandatory for all cars to have them. The six billion taka contract was given without a competitive tender process. The government chose RFID tags rather than GPS because they perceived GPS to be more expensive. The Daily Star described the RFID tags as "less effective, time-consuming and costly". The work was subcontracted to an American company that manufactured the plates in Poland. In 2014, there were only 12 RFID scanners in Bangladesh, and all of them were in Dhaka for the 2.1 million tags in use.

In October 2011, Bangladesh Machine Tools Factory started manufacturing light bulbs and LED lights. Bangladesh Machine Tools Factory Limited unveiled a car lift system that it had developed in collaboration with Daiei, a Japanese firm. The development was announced by Major General Anup Kumar Chakma, Master-General of the Ordnance. Bangladesh Machine Tools Factory Limited manufactured Electronic Voting Machine (EVM) in collaboration with Bangladesh University of Engineering and Technology for the Bangladesh Election Commission. The project was supervised by Jamilur Reza Choudhury.

Bangladesh Machine Tools Factory Limited manufactured two vans for Bangladesh Jail. The vans were equipped with an online surveillance system and were handed over to the prison authorities on 30 January 2017. In October 2017, Bangladesh Machine Tools Factory Limited and the Bangladesh Election Commission decided to jointly implement a 16 billion taka project to create smart national ID cards.

In 2017, Bangladesh Machine Tools Factory supplied electronic voting machines for elections in Rangpur City Corporation. The Bangladesh Election Commission was satisfied with the new design and ordered 2500 more units for the 2018 Bangladeshi general election. They would buy 150 thousand electronic voting machines from Bangladesh Machine Tools Factory for the election with a total cost of 40 billion taka.

In September 2018, Bangladesh Machine Tools Factory established a furniture manufacturing unit called BMTF Furniture. On 12 September 2018, the Cabinet Committee on Government Purchase approved a contract to buy shotguns and shells worth 1.47 billion taka for Bangladesh Ansar and Village Defence Party to Bangladesh Machine Tools Factory.

Bangladesh Machine Tools Factory started construction on three model villages through a 1.54 billion taka project in October 2019. The model villages are located in Rangpur District, Gopalganj District, and Bogura District. The project was retroactively approved by the Cabinet Committee on Economic Affairs.

Bangladesh Machine Tools Factory Limited also produces products for civilian use. It produced Germnil hand sanitizer during the COVID-19 pandemic in Bangladesh. It also donated to the Prime Minister's Relief and Welfare Fund to help those affected by the pandemic. In February 2020, the Bangladesh Road Transport Authority cancelled a contract for 400 thousand license plates and chose to buy them from Bangladesh Machine Tools Factory Limited. In April 2020, Bangladesh Machine Tools Factory announced that it would create ventilators for the COVID-19 pandemic with technical support from the Massachusetts Institute of Technology.

Mohammad Abdur Razzaque, Minister of Agriculture, urged Bangladesh Machine Tools Factory Limited to produce more farm equipment as part of the government's effort to mechanize farming in Bangladesh.

On 17 September 2020, the Cabinet of Bangladesh approved a proposal by Bangladesh Rural Electrification Board to buy 1.64 billion taka worth of electric poles from Bangladesh Machine Tools Factory Limited. The Cabinet Committee on Economic Affairs approved a proposal by the Bangladesh Rural Electrification Board to buy 323 million taka worth of electric poles from Bangladesh Machine Tools Factory on 27 January 2021.

== Army Pharma ==
Army Pharma Limited, a subsidiary of BMTF, started production at Shimultali, Joydebpur, Gazipur since 2020.

=== Criticism ===
In February 2025, large-scale lottery and gambling games were organized at a small and cottage industry fair organized under the auspices of the company's authorities at the designated site for the Army Pharma to be built under the company's ownership, which generated widespread reactions and criticism in local circles. At the same unauthorized fair held in September 2025, an accident occurred on 30 September in which several people were injured when a moving carousel tipped over. It is also said that fraud is being carried out at the fair in the name of a lottery, where prizes are secretly given to predetermined people.

== Legal notice to stop civil activities ==
On 20 December 2025, a legal notice has been sent to Bangladesh Machine Tools Factory (BMTF) demanding the cessation of its civilian commercial activities. Private entrepreneurs have alleged that their business is being harmed by BMTF selling its products in the general market with state benefits, which is a violation of the 'Competition Act, 2012', so the company has been asked to focus only on the production and marketing of military equipment.

== See also ==
- Bangladesh Ordnance Factories
- The Security Printing Corporation (Bangladesh) Ltd.
- Pragoti
- List of companies of Bangladesh
- Defence industry of Bangladesh
- Gambling in Islam
