= Barrett Communications =

- Type: Private
- Industry: HF and VHF Communications
- Founded: 1976
- Headquarters: Bibra Lake, Perth, Western Australia
- Products: HF and VHF commercial and tactical communications equipment
- Parent: Motorola Solutions (2022–present)
- Subsidiaries: Barrett Europe Limited
- Website: www.barrettcommunications.com.au

Barrett Communications is a specialist manufacturer and supplier of commercial high frequency (HF), tactical HF and very high frequency (VHF) communications equipment. Its head office for design and manufacturing is located in Perth, Western Australia. Barrett was acquired by Motorola Solutions in 2022.

== History ==
Barrett Communications was founded in 1976. The company steadily grew and began exporting their first commercial HF radios in 1987. The range has been expanded to include transceivers (base, portable and mobile), modems, power supplies, amplifiers, antennas and accessories.

In May 2009, Barrett Communications acquired Q-MAC Electronics which increased the Barrett Communications product range to include VHF radio systems.

In August 2011, Barrett Communications received certification from the Joint Interoperability Test Command (JITC) for its Barrett 2050 HF mobile and base station transceiver. This certification includes conformance to MIL-STD-188-141B as well as the Automatic Link Establishment (ALE) specifications of MIL-STD-188-141B Appendix A.

In 2012 Barrett Communications exported to over 150 countries with a global dealer network in 65 countries.

Barrett Communications also operates a marketing office in the United Kingdom. Barrett Europe Limited, a wholly owned subsidiary of Barrett Communications, is located in Whiteley in Hampshire.

In 2019 Barrett Communications opened an office in Pittsford, NY. Barrett products now manufactured in the USA

In 2020 Barrett Communications partners with Royal Communications International, Inc. for sales and service in the USA

== High Frequency Radio Communications ==
Barrett Communications designs and manufactures a range of HF communications equipment for commercial and tactical use. The range includes transceivers (base, portable and mobile), modems, power supplies, amplifiers, antennas and accessories. Barrett’s range of HF communications equipment ranges from basic voice communication to data, email, fax and GPS tracking.

Barrett’s PRC-2090 tactical radio meets MIL-STD 180G, FED-STD 1045 / MIL-STD 188-141B ALE (JITC certifiable) and AS-NZS 4770:200.

== Very High Frequency Communications ==
Barrett Communications designs and manufactures a range of VHF, communications equipment specifically for tactical use. The range known as the Barrett PRC-2080 Tactical VHF radio system includes VHF 30 to 88 MHz squad, brigade, base and mobile transceivers and rebroadcast units. This equipment provides digital voice, encryption, frequency hopping, data, positional awareness and rebroadcast capability.
