= Caterpillar D2 =

Agricultural tractor

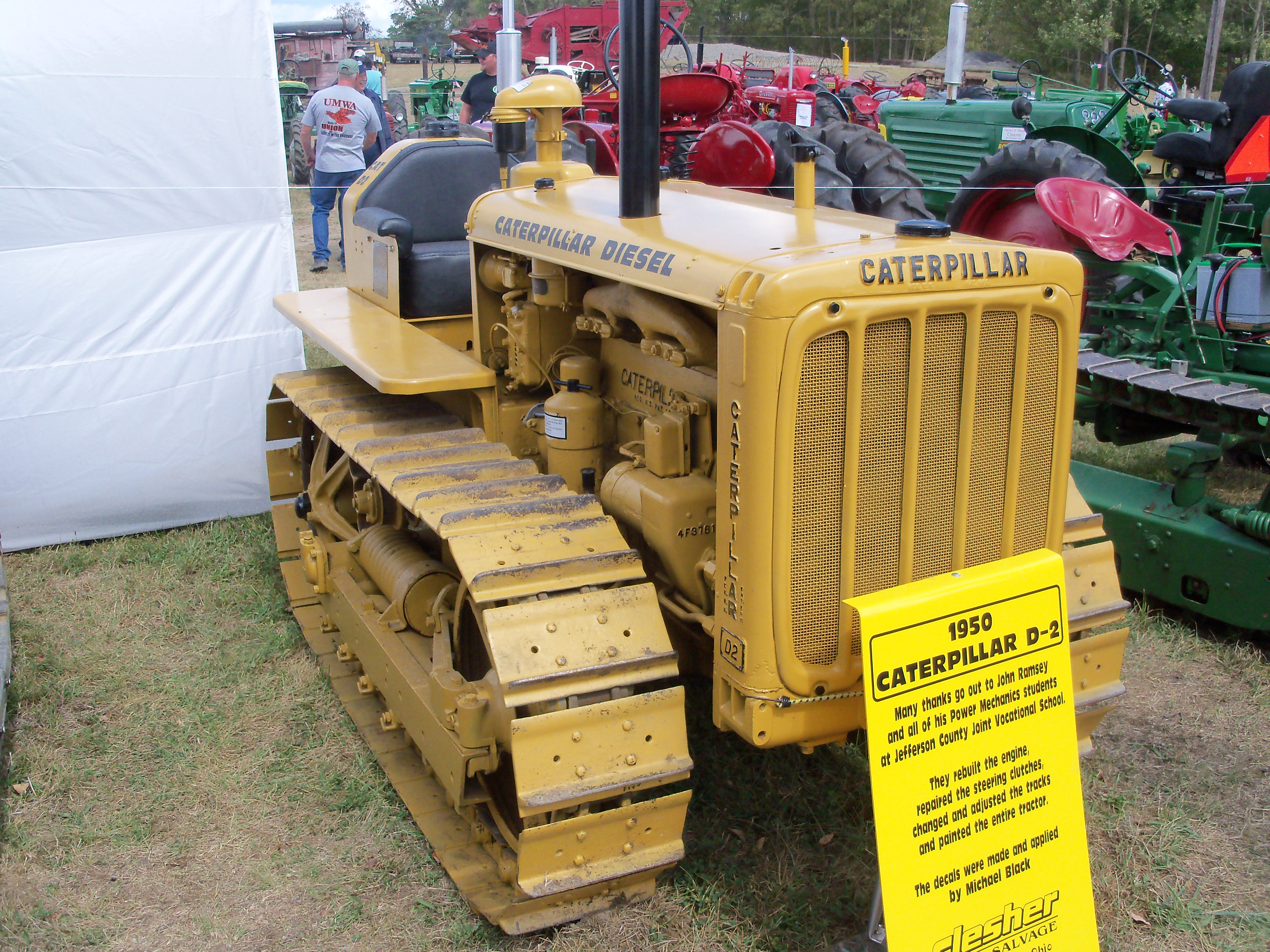
- Type: agricultural
- Manufacturer: Caterpillar
- Production: 1938–1957
- Length: 108 in (274 cm)
- Height: 57.5 in (146 cm)
- Weight: 7,420–8,536 lb (3,366–3,872 kg)
- Propulsion: Caterpillar tracks (12 in (30 cm))
- Engine model: Inline-4 cyl diesel engine: Caterpillar D311 3.6 L (220 cu in); Caterpillar D3400 4.1 L (250 cu in)
- Gross power: 30 hp (22 kW) 4.1L
- Succeeded by: Caterpillar D5

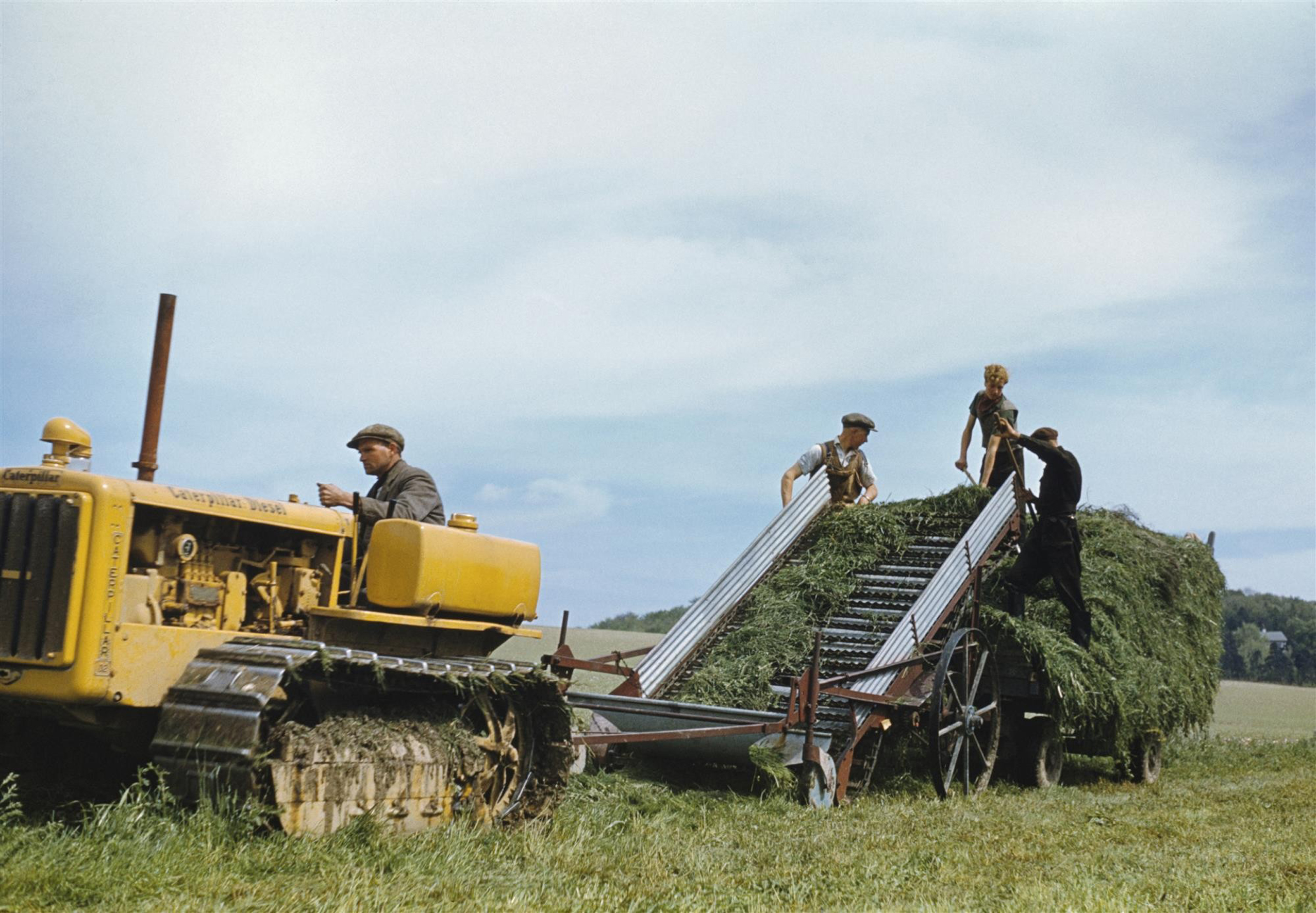
Caterpillar D2 with cutter and cart

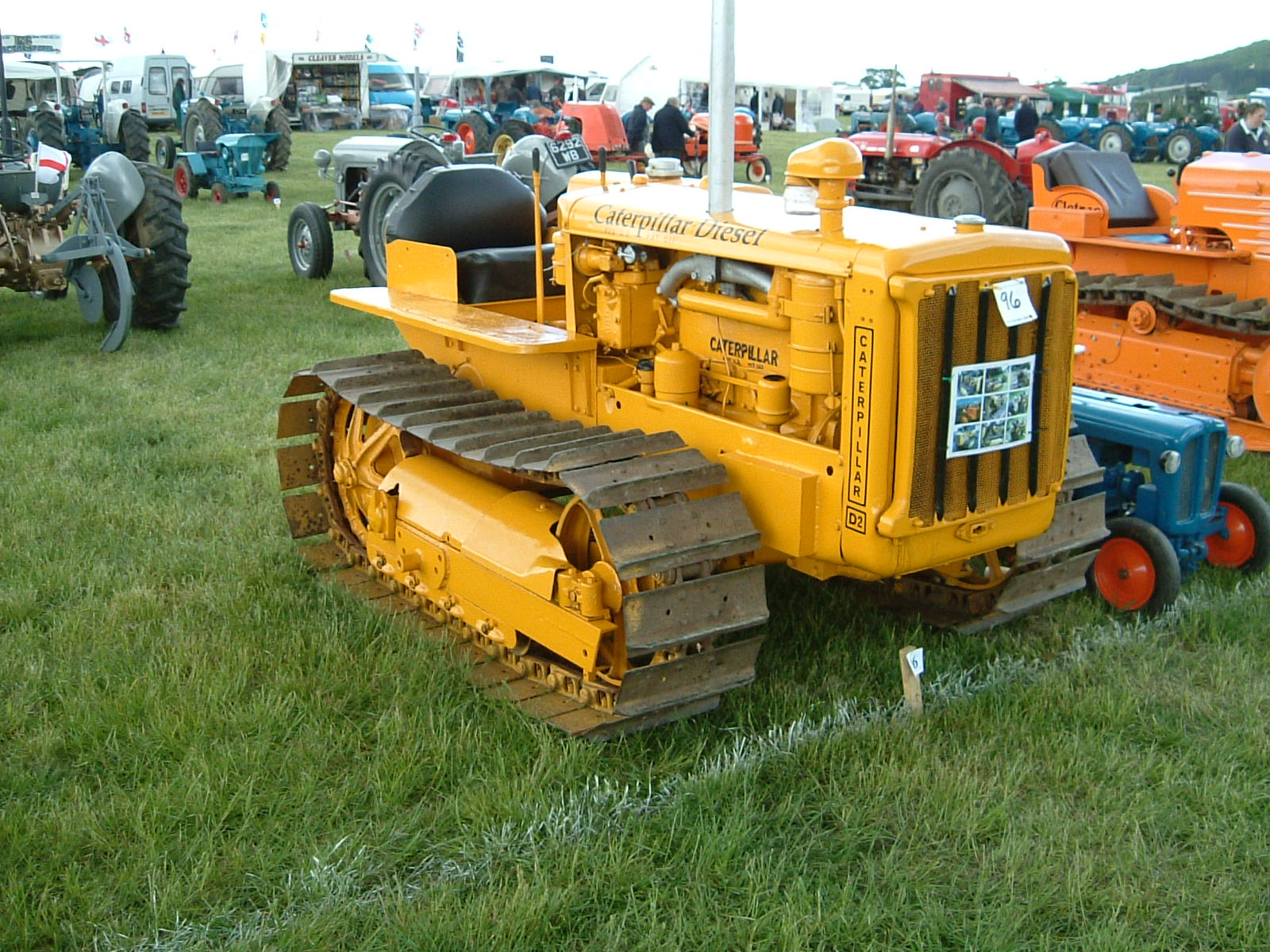
Caterpillar D2 compact crawler tractor (built from 1938–1957) at the Belvoir Castle Steam Festival 2007, Belvoir Castle, England.

The Caterpillar D2 is an agricultural tractor manufactured by Caterpillar. It was introduced in 1938 and was the smallest diesel powered track-type tractor manufactured by Caterpillar.

== Overview ==
The Caterpillar D2 was manufactured from 1938 through 1957 by Caterpillar Inc. in their factory in Peoria, Illinois, USA. The base frame of this model of tractor is a crawler, and it is equipped with five forward gears and one reverse gear. The D2's weight ranges from about 7,420 to 8,536 pounds (3,366 to 3,872 kilograms), depending upon the year it was manufactured. Caterpillar began producing this model (among others) in response to the "New Deal" programs that were initiated by President Franklin Roosevelt to stimulate America's economy. A total of 26,454 D2's were made over the nineteen years they were in production.
