= Cyclone (rifle) =

Sniper rifles by Steel Core Designs

Cyclone HSR/ MSR / LSR
- Type: Cyclone HSR: Anti-materiel sniper rifle; Cyclone LSR long barrel and MSR long barrel, short barrel: Sniper rifle; Cyclone LSR short barrel: Designated marksman rifle
- Place of origin: United Kingdom

Service history
- In service: 2017-present
- Used by: Bangladesh Army
- Wars: American-led intervention in Iraq (2014-present); Syrian Civil War

Production history
- Designer: Steel Core Designs

Specifications
- Mass: Cyclone HSR: 14.5 kg (32 lb); Cyclone MSR: 7.21 kg (15.9 lb); Cyclone LSR: 6.85 kg (15.1 lb)
- Length: Cyclone HSR: 57 in (1,400 mm); Cyclone MSR: Long barrel 50 in (1,300 mm), Short barrel 43 in (1,100 mm); Cyclone LSR: Long barrel 47 in (1,200 mm), Short barrel 41 in (1,000 mm)
- Barrel length: Cyclone HSR: 29 in (740 mm); Cyclone MSR: Long barrel 27 in (690 mm), Short barrel 20 in (510 mm); Cyclone LSR: Long barrel 26 in (660 mm), Short barrel 20 in (510 mm)
- Cartridge: Cyclone HSR: .50 BMG (12.7x99mm); Cyclone MSR: 7.62x51mm NATO; Cyclone LSR: .338 Lapua Magnum
- Action: Bolt-action
- Effective firing range: Cyclone HSR: 2,200 m (2,400 yd); Cyclone MSR: Long barrel 1,800 m (2,000 yd), short barrel 1,250 m (1,370 yd); Cyclone LSR: Long barrel 1,000 m (1,100 yd), short barrel 600 m (660 yd)
- Feed system: Cyclone HSR: 5-round magazine; Cyclone LSR and MSR: 10-round magazine

The Cyclone is a series of three bolt action long range rifles created by British company Steel Core Designs: the HSR, which fires .50 BMG (12.7x99mm), the MSR, which fires .338 Lapua Magnum (8.6x70mm) and the LSR, which fires 7.62x51mm NATO.

Cyclone rifles are primarily designed for military use, and have seen limited usage by military and law enforcement's units since 2017 in marksman roles. They are also sold on the civilian market.

== Design ==
The Cyclone come pre-fitted with certain attachments and match grade parts to help maximise accuracy and general performance.

They have a 600mm Picatinny rail, a four-lug rotating bolt and a Match grade barrel.

It comes fitted with a muzzle brake by default and can use a bipod.

== Combat history ==
In the contemporary conflicts in Iraq and Syria, soldiers belonging to the Islamic State have used vehicle borne improvised explosive devices (VBIEDs), to which, anti materiel rifles, such as the Cyclone HSR are used as a cheap alternative to ATGMs.

== Comparison ==
Name	Caliber	Magazine capacity	Effective range	Barrel length	Overall length	Weight
LSR	7.62×51mm NATO	10 rounds	600m (656yd)	51 cm (20 in)	104 cm (41 in)	6.85 kg (15.1 lb)
MSR	.338 Lapua Magnum	10 rounds	1,250m (1,367yd)	51 cm (20 in)	109 cm (43 in)	7.21 kg (15.9 lb)
HSR	.50 BMG	5 rounds	2,220m (2,427yd)	74 cm (29 in)	145 cm (57 in)	14.5 kg (31.9 lb)

== Users ==
- Bangladesh: HSR, in use by the Bangladesh Army.
- Indonesia: LSR, in use by Mobile Brigade Corps (Brimob).
- Iraq: HSR, in use by Iraqi Ministry of Interior's Emergency Response Brigade (ERB).

== See also ==
- SC-76 Thunderbolt
