= Bangladesh Ordnance Factories =

Bangladeshi defence company

- বাংলাদেশ সমরাস্ত্র কারখানা
- Logo of Bangladesh Ordnance Factories

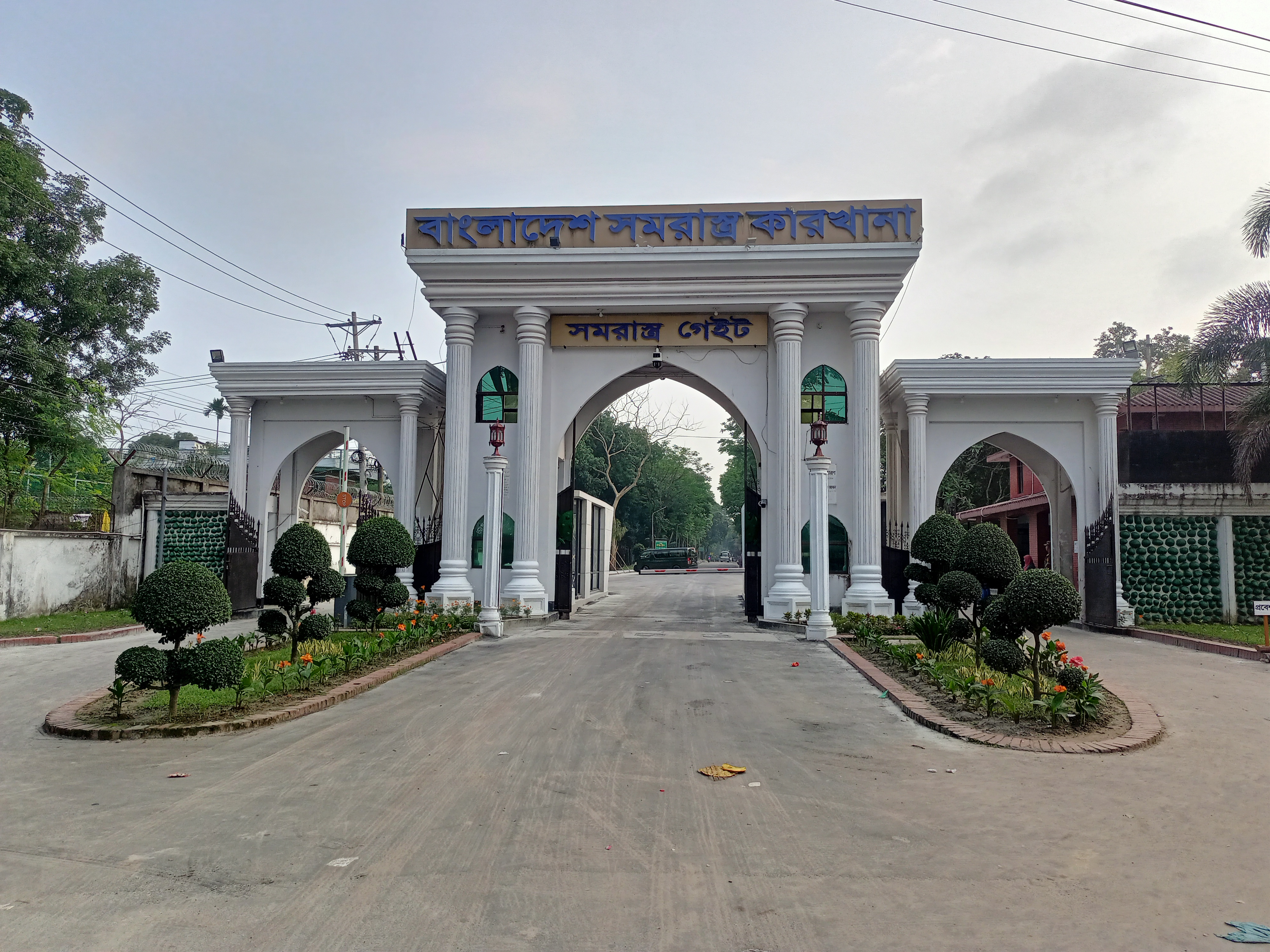
- Founded: April 6, 1970; 56 years ago
- Type: State-owned enterprise
- Location: Gazipur, Dhaka, Bangladesh
- Region served: Bangladesh
- Products: Firearms, Artillery, Fuses, Detonators, Explosives.
- Owner: Bangladesh Army
- Commandant: Major General Syed Sabbir Ahmed
- Website: www.bof.gov.bd

Bangladesh Ordnance Factories (BOF) is the largest industrial supplier of the Bangladesh Army. Situated in Gazipur, it produces arms, ammunition, and equipment for the Bangladesh Armed Forces.

== History ==
The establishment of a rifle factory and small-arms ammunition plant for Pakistan Army began in 1968 with the technical and financial assistance of the People's Republic of China. The facility was inaugurated on 6 April 1970. Although it suffered considerable damage during the Bangladesh Liberation War in 1971, its capabilities have been restored and expanded since.

In 1982–1983, BMR (Balancing, Modernization, Replacement) works started which was completed in 1987. After the BMR, the yearly production target of the factory was determined to be 2500 rifles and 15 million ammunition per annum. Project on establishment of 'Automatic Assault Rifle BD-08' factory was under taken in 2004-2005 and it was successfully implemented in the year 2008.

In June 2021, a Turkey 105 mm and 155 mm artillery shell production line establishment agreement was signed between Bangladesh and Turkish company REPKON. With the modern Free Flowforming (REPKON patented) technology and computerized machinery from REPKON, BOF will produce high-quality 105 mm and 155 mm artillery shells. According to Uğur Cem Gürpınar, REPKON business development and corporate communications officer, "Bangladesh, like many friendly and allied countries, preferred REPKON because of its technology that is ahead of its competitors in the world". Bangladesh Army is currently using western standard 105 mm and 155 mm artilleries as well as Chinese 122 mm and 130 mm artilleries.

== Technology ==
Initially BOF was set up with technologies machines, equipment and support facilities from China, but gradually technology transfers from Austria, Australia, Belgium, Germany, Turkey, China & Italy were added. BOF now boasts a mix of conventional and state of the art computerized controlled processes/systems for manufacturing.

== Factories ==
Bangladesh Ordnance Factories currently operates the following factories.

1. Small arms manufacturing factory
2. Small arms ammunition factory
3. Ball, tracer, blank and API ammunition for rifle, SMG, LMG and HMG manufacturing factory
4. Rifles manufacturing factory
5. Machine gun manufacturing factory
6. Grenade manufacturing factory
7. Artillery ammunition factory
8. Tools manufacturing plant

== Products ==
The products of Bangladesh Ordnance Factory are different types of ammunition, artillery shells and infantry weapons. BOF is planning to produce a variety of artillery weapons, military hardware, precision weapons as well as developing and producing indigenous ordnance weapons and equipment.

=== Assault rifles ===
- BD-08: BD-08 and BD-08 MK-II with optical sight. It is the current standard-issue rifle of the Bangladesh Army and also used by Border Guard Bangladesh and other forces. It is a Bangladeshi variant of the Chinese Type 81 assault rifle.

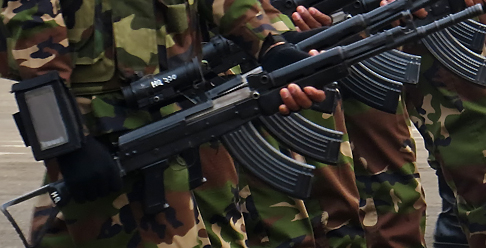

- Type 56 assault rifle - Assembled locally. It is a Chinese variant of the Soviet-designed AK-47 (specifically Type 3) and AKM rifles. It is used by Bangladesh Armed Forces, Border Guard Bangladesh and other forces in a large quantity.

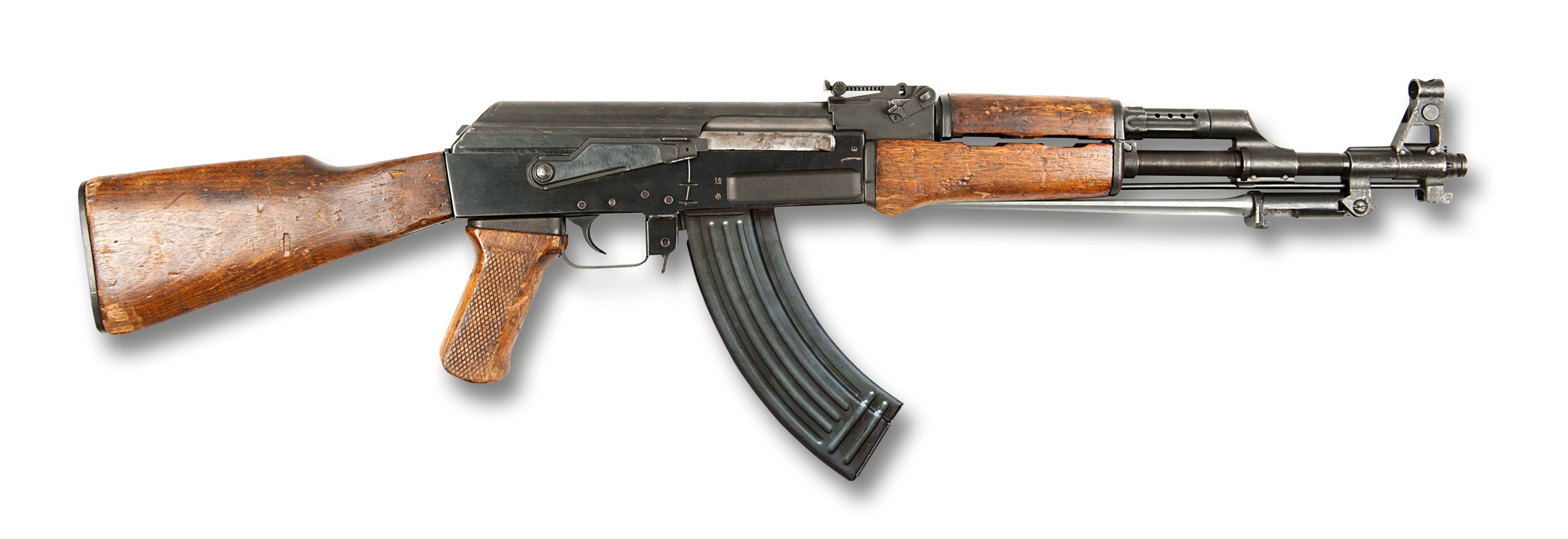

=== Semi-Automatic carbine ===
- Type-56: Chinese variant of SKS. BOF produced Type 56 under license till 2006. It was previously the standard-issue rifle of the Bangladesh Army before the introduction of BD-08 .

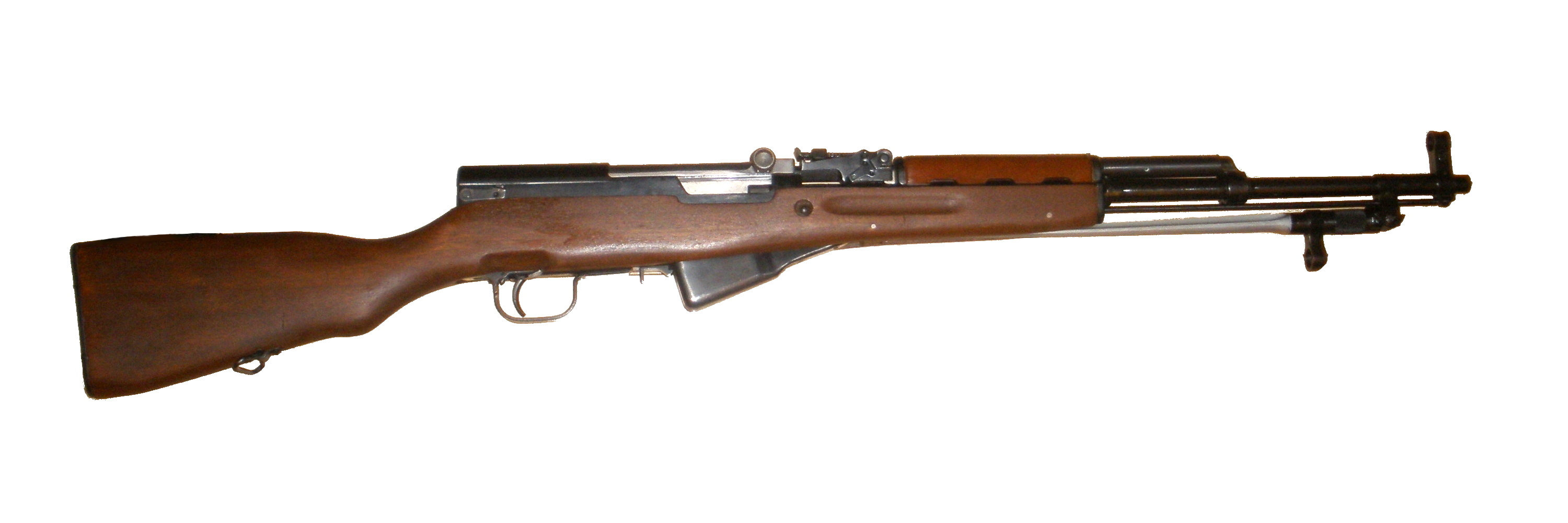

=== Machine guns ===
- BD-15: Light machine gun (LMG) variant of BD-08 assault rifle.

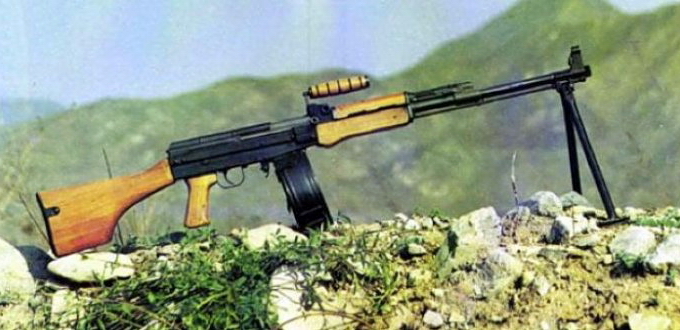

=== Grenades ===
- Arges 84 BD: Produced under license. Licensed version of Austrian ARGES Type HG-84.

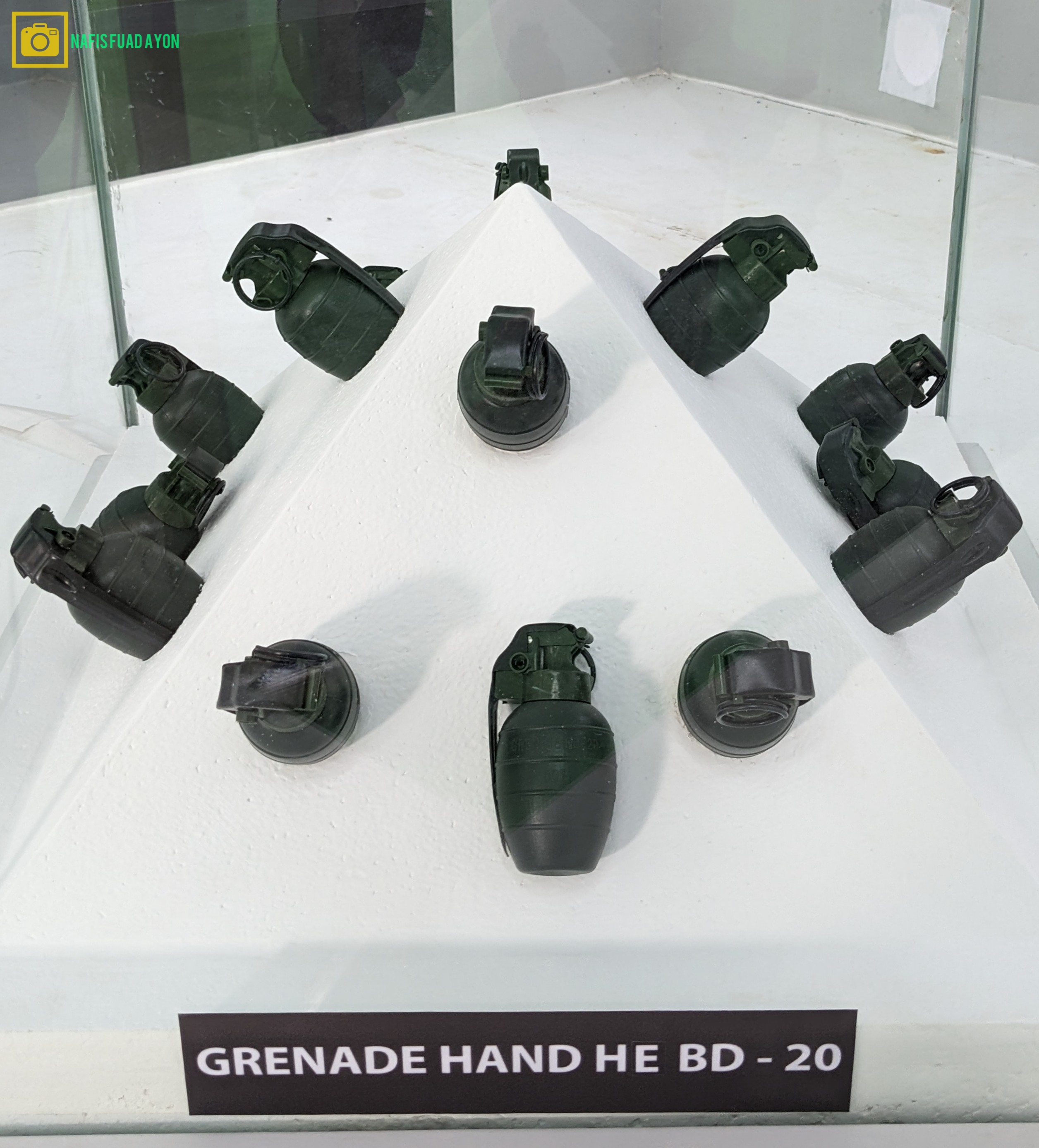

=== Mortars ===
- Mortar gun: At least one model under production but official details by BOF is not available. BOF tested their prototype 60 mm and 82 mm mortar guns before 2016.

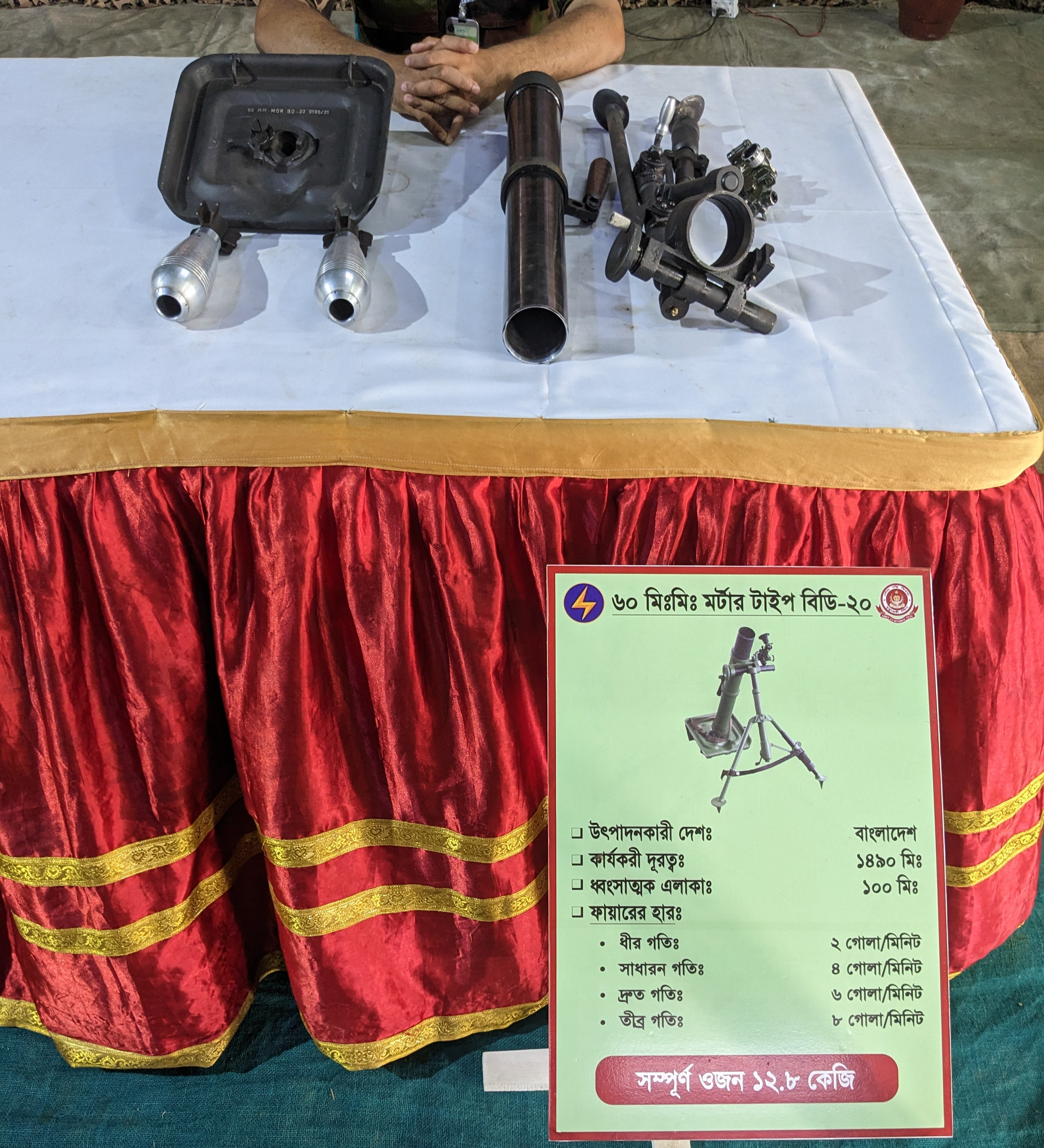

=== Ammunition ===
==== Small arms ====
- 7.62×39mm Soviet/Russian
- 7.62×54mmR Soviet/Russian
- 7.62×51mm NATO

==== Artillery shells ====
- 105mm artillery shell

==== Mortar bombs ====
- Mortar bombs: At least one model under production including fuze manufacturing but official details by BOF is available. BOF tested their prototype 60 mm and 82 mm mortar bombs before 2016.

=== Military explosives ===
- TNT slab

== Projects ==
=== Future projects ===
1. Opening production line for Anti Tank Guided Weapon (ATGM).
2. Opening production line for MANPADS.
3. Opening more modern production line for 105 mm and new production line for 155 mm artillery shells with Free Flowforming technology and computerized machinery from Turkish company REPKON.
4. Opening fuze manufacturing production line for 105 mm, 122 mm, 130 mm and 155 mm artillery shells.
5. Opening fuze manufacturing production line for 60 mm and 82 mm mortar bombs.
6. Opening 40 mm grenade production line for automatic grenade launcher. BOF planned to produce 100000 HE (High Explosive), 25000 HEDP (High Explosive Dual Purpose) and 75000 training 40 mm grenade cartridges per year. Maximum range of these cartridges will be 2200 meters and effective range will be 1500 meters.
7. Establishment of different types of computer numerical control (CNC) machining center.

== See also ==
- Bangladesh Machine Tools Factory
- Bangladesh Aeronautical Centre
- Defence industry of Bangladesh
