= Abu Yousuf Mohammad Mahfuzur Rahman =

Bangladeshi army officer

A Y M Mahfuzur Rahman
- আবু ইউসুফ মোহাম্মদ মাহফুজুর রহমান
- Born: 1 October 1942; Kishoreganj, Bengal, British India
- Died: 23 September 1981 (aged 38); Chittagong Central Jail, Chittagong, Bangladesh
- Burial place: Banani, Dhaka
- Military career
- Allegiance: Pakistan (Before 1971); Bangladesh
- Branch: Pakistan Army; Bangladesh Army
- Service years: 1968–1981
- Rank: Lieutenant Colonel
- Unit: East Bengal Regiment
- Commands: Sub-Commander of Sector – I; CO of 2nd East Bengal Regiment; GSO-1 of President
- Known for: Assassination of Ziaur Rahman
- Conflicts: Bangladesh Liberation War
- Awards: Bir Bikrom

Abu Yousuf Mohammad Mahfuzur Rahman, also known as A.Y.M. Mahfuzur Rahman, (1 October 1942 – 23 September 1981) was a Bangladeshi army officer who served as a sub-sector commander during the Bangladesh Liberation War. In 1981, he was executed for his alleged involvement in the assassination of President Ziaur Rahman.

== Career ==
=== Bangladesh Liberation War ===
Mahfuzur joined the Pakistan Army in 1967 and was commissioned in 1968, being assigned to the 2nd East Bengal Regiment. When the Bangladesh Liberation War began on 25 March 1971, he was a captain in the 8th East Bengal Regiment, which revolted against Pakistan.

During the war, Mahfuzur was a sub-sector commander in sector 1. He was responsible for the Sreenagar sub-sector (along with Captain Matiur Rahman) and the Manughat sub-sector.

For his actions during the war, Mahfuzur was awarded Bir Bikrom. After the independence of Bangladesh, he was promoted to the rank of major. He served as the adjutant of the 8th East Bengal Regiment. He also served as the brigade major of the 55th Independent Brigade. He was promoted to the rank of lieutenant colonel in 1977 and served as the commanding officer of the 4th East Bengal Regiment. Later he served as the general staff officer I of the 24th Infantry Division and personal secretary to the President of Bangladesh.

=== Assassination of Ziaur Rahman ===
In Bangladesh: A Legacy of Blood, Anthony Mascarenhas outlines Mahfuzur's role in the assassination of President Ziaur Rahman. On 25 May 1981, one of the key plotters, Lt. Colonel Matiur Rahman, was visiting Dhaka, where he met his friend Mahfuzur. At the time, Mahfuzur was the personal staff officer (secretary) of Zia. Mahfuzur informed Matiur about Zia's plans to transfer Major General Abul Manzoor from Chittagong to Dhaka, a decision that would also affect Matiur, who was angered by this news. According to evidence presented at the trial, Matiur and Mahfuzur discussed plans to assassinate Zia.

On 29 May, Mafuzur withdrew the two armed police officers, who were meant to guard Zia's suit at the Circuit House in Chittagong. Furthermore, he provided a copy of the accommodation arrangements for the president to the conspirators, through Major Mujibur Rahman.

When the conspirators attacked the Circuit House during the early hours of 30 May, Mahfuzur was present in the building. During the attack, he remained in his room and only came out after the attackers left. During the subsequent investigation, Mahfazur claimed to have been fired upon by an armed man in uniform. There were bullet holes on the wall of his room, which he used to support his story. However, investigators concluded that these bullet holes were made by Mahfuzur himself.

He was arrested on 4 June 1981 and released on 17 June due to a lack of evidence against him. However, he was arrested again on 4 July and taken to Chittagong cantonment and tortured. During his imprisonment, he was allegedly forced to sign a confession. From prison, he wrote several letters in which he claimed to be innocent.

== Death ==
Mahfuzur was hanged on 23 September 1981, in Chittagong Prison. He was buried beside Brigadier Mohsin Uddin Ahmed at Dhaka's Banani graveyard.
