= Assassination of Ziaur Rahman =

1981 murder of former president of Bangladesh

Coordinates: 22.3482°N 91.8239°E

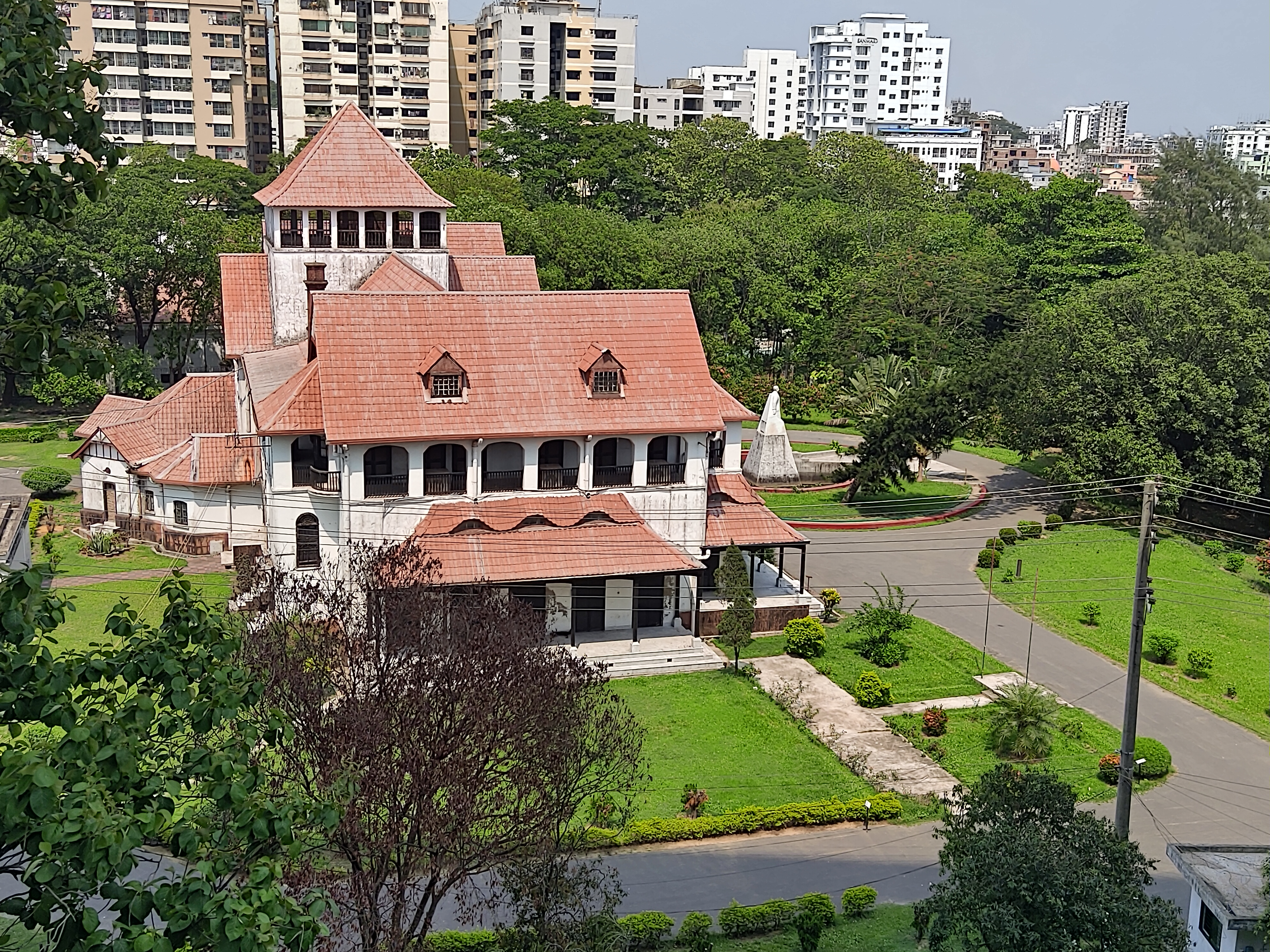
- Old Circuit House Building, Chittagong
- Location: Circuit House, Chittagong, Bangladesh
- Date: 30 May 1981; 4:00 a.m. (BST)
- Target: Ziaur Rahman
- Attack type: Military coup
- Weapons: 11 sub machine guns 3 rocket launchers 3 grenade firing rifles
- Deaths: 8: Ziaur Rahman; Lt. Colonel A.K.M. Moinul Ahsan; Captain Ashraful Hafiz Khan; Naik Md. Abu Taher; Abul Kashem (Sepoy); Abdur Rauf (Sepoy); Md. Shah Alam (Sepoy); Dulal Mia (Constable)
- Injuries: 16 person (including Guards)
- Assailants: 16 army officers with a few soldiers: Lt. Colonel Matiur Rahman; Major S.M. Khaled; Lt. Colonel Shah Md. Fazle Hossain; Major Mozaffar Hossain; Captain Mosleh Uddin; Captain Jamil Haque; Captain Mohammad Abdus Sattar; Lt. Colonel Mahbubur Rahman; Major Kazi Mominul Haque; Captain Salahuddin Ahmed; Captain Mohammed Ilyas; Captain Gias Uddin Ahmed; Major A.Z. Gias Uddin Ahmed; Captain Syed Mohammad Munir; Major Fazlul Haque; Lt. Rafiqul Hassan Khan
- Motive: Social injustices, corruption, political and economic rot during Ziaur Rahman regime

Ziaur Rahman, the sixth president of Bangladesh, was assassinated by members of the Bangladesh Army on 30 May 1981 in the southeastern port city of Chittagong. Rahman went to Chittagong to arbitrate in a clash between the local leaders of his political party, the Bangladesh Nationalist Party (BNP). On the night of 30 May, a group of officers commandeered the Chittagong Circuit House, a government residence where Ziaur Rahman was staying, shooting him and several others.

== Background ==
=== Ziaur's presidency ===
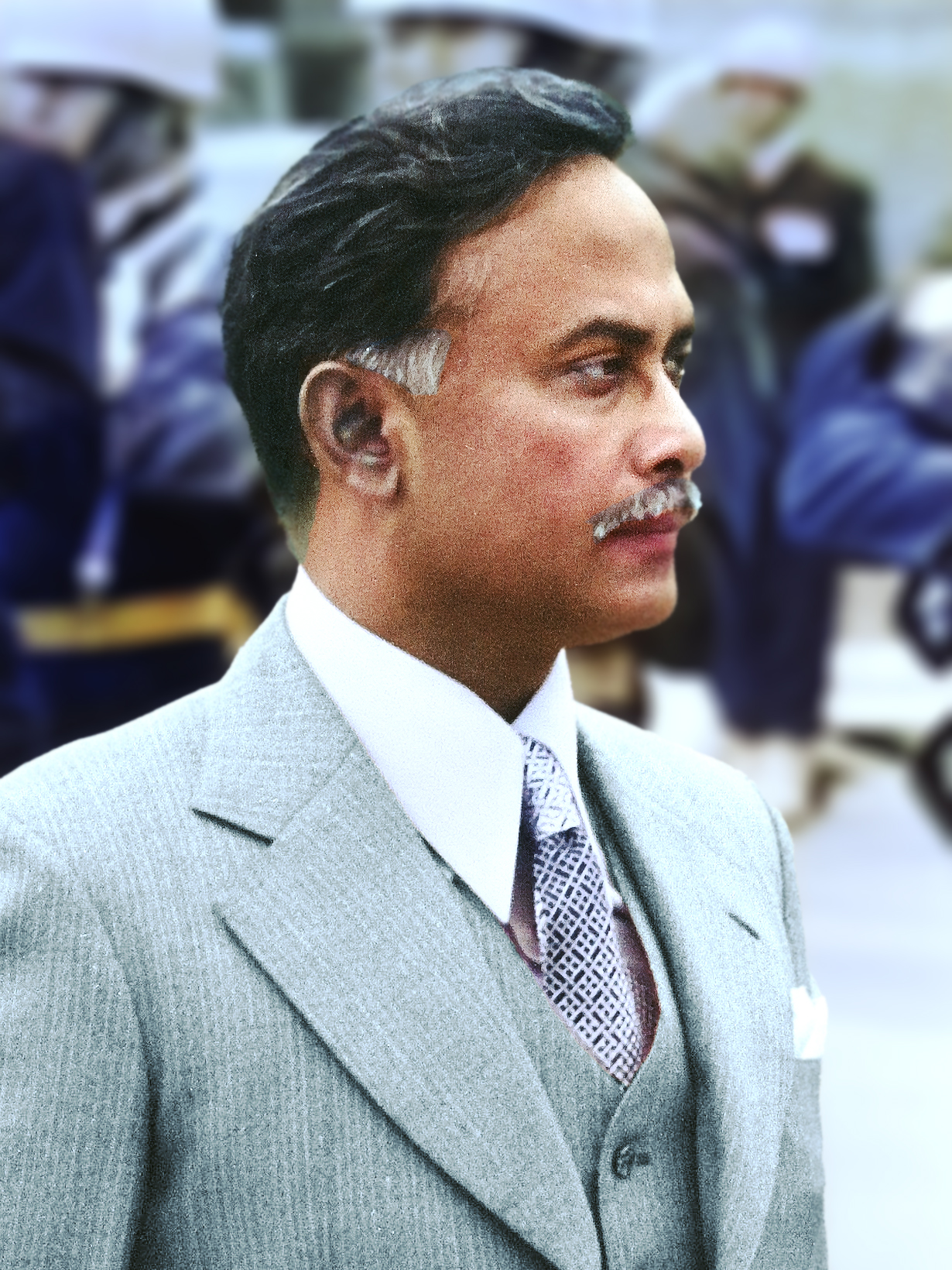
President Ziaur Rahman

Ziaur Rahman's tenure as the President of Bangladesh began on 21 April 1977 by taking over the presidency from Abu Sadat Mohammad Sayem. He said with a hint of creating competition in the country's politics,

"I will make politics difficult for the politicians."

Less than 24 hours after taking office as president of Bangladesh, Zia announced a confidence referendum to gauge public views on his rule. Critics suggested the confidence vote was his bid to legitimize his presidency.

=== Referendum and election ===
The referendum held on 30 May 1977 shocked political commentators and observers. According to the Election Commission of Bangladesh, Zia received 98.87% of the vote, with only 1% of voters opposing his views, raising serious questions about the process.

With the plebiscite moot, Zia announced presidential elections the following year. It was the first presidential election held in Bangladesh after the political revolution.

Zia entered the election race as the candidate of the Nationalist Front, a six-party coalition that included Islamist parties like the Muslim League on one side and minority-led parties like the Federation of Scheduled Castes on the other. His main rival was General MAG Osmani, the commander-in-chief of the Bangladesh Liberation Army in 1971, who was supported by the Democratic Alliance, a platform of the Awami League and some left-wing parties.

A group of parties led by Ataur Rahman boycotted the elections, including the Democratic League, the Islamic Democratic League, Jatiya Dal, the Jatiya League and the Krishak Sramik Party.

=== Allegations of election rigging ===
In the presidential election held in 1978, Zia got about 76% of the votes and General Osmani got 21% according to the figures shared by the authorities. Osmani's supporters have claimed that the election was rigged and ballot boxes were stuffed across the country. However, there was no concrete evidence of election rigging.

=== Compromise with opponents of independence ===
On 31 December 1975, about 11,000 war criminals were released, including 752 convicts, by canceling the 'Bangladesh Collaborators (Special Tribunals) Order, 1972'. Zia took several controversial steps to discipline the army and consolidate power, and to gain the support of some right-wing political parties such as the Jamaat-e-Islami.

Article 38 of the Constitution was amended on 22 April 1977. Other parties including the Muslim League and Jamaat-e-Islami were granted constitutional legitimacy as well as their return. Religion-based politics was also allowed during this period. A special 'Citizenship Act' was enacted in the 5th Amendment of the Constitution on 5 April 1978. Under which Ghulam Azam was allowed to enter the country and Abbas Ali Khan became the Ameer of the Jamaat in 1979, giving legitimacy to the politics of Bangladesh.

Zia very controversially appointed anti-independence figure Shah Azizur Rahman as Prime Minister. who, though a Bengali, went to the United Nations as Pakistan's representative in 1971 and said,

"... the military has done nothing wrong by attacking East Pakistan. What is going on in Pakistan in the name of liberation war is Indian conspiracy and separatist movement ..."

=== Validation of the Indemnity Act, 1975 ===
Zia had appointed several people accused of killing Sheikh Mujibur Rahman abroad. Including, Major Dalim, Major Rashid and Major Faruque were given jobs in the Ministry of Foreign Affairs and in later years they were appointed ambassadors of Bangladesh to African and Middle Eastern countries.

The Indemnity Ordinance (which granted immunity from legal action to those involved in the assassination of President Sheikh Mujibur Rahman, the coup and other political events between 1975 and 1979) was promulgated by President Khondaker Mostaq Ahmad in 1975, which was converted into an Act of Parliament by the Bangladesh Nationalist Party on 9 July 1979 through the Indemnity Act, 1979. The Act was added as the Fifth Amendment to the Constitution that year.

=== National anthem debate ===
Prime Minister Shah Azizur Rahman said in a secret letter to the Cabinet Division,

"A song written by Rabindranath Tagore is the Indian national anthem. He is not a citizen of Bangladesh. The Muslim Ummah is worried that a song written by a poet from the Hindu community is the national anthem. National Anthem needs to be changed as this song is against the spirit of our culture."

In the Prime Minister's letter, instead of "Amar Sonar Bangla", "Prothom Bangladesh" was proposed as the national anthem. After receiving this letter from the Prime Minister, the Cabinet Division issued instructions to broadcast the Prothom Bangladesh song on radio, television and all government programs. The song started singing along with the national anthem at the Presidential functions. But after Zia's death in 1981, the initiative stalled.

=== Rise and death of Colonel Taher ===
Zia had long been in touch with a popular army officer, Colonel Taher. Colonel Taher headed the Jasad-created "Ganobahini", a semi-military group within the army. When Zia was under house arrest during the 3 November 1975 coup, he asked Taher over the phone for help in his release.

Taher presented a 12-point demand aimed at uniting the soldiers. These 12 clauses were mainly made to protect the interests of the sepoys. Col. Taher and Jasad initiated a plan to free Zia and implement 12 points from Zia for the sake of sepoys.

Thousands of leaflets were circulated in the cantonment on the initiative of Jasad. Propaganda is being done that Khaled Musharraf is an 'agent of India' and that Khaled rose to power in India's conspiracy. In this situation, the enraged lower-ranking sepoys staged a counter-coup on November 7 with the help of the Jasad Gana Bahini.

Enraged soldiers continued to kill officers in this coup. The mutineers freed Ziaur Rahman from his Dhaka cantonment house arrest and brought him to the headquarters of the 2nd Field Artillery. That morning, Major General Khaled Musharraf, Colonel Khandkar Nazmul Huda and Lt. Col. ATM Hyder were killed by angry soldiers at the headquarters of the 10th East Bengal Regiment established by themselves in Sher Bangla Nagar in response to the counter-coup.

Meanwhile, Zia hugged Colonel Taher and thanked Taher for saving his life. Zia also said that he is ready to give his life for Colonel Taher and Jas. Zia then gave a radio address without the president's permission and claimed to be the chief martial law administrator. He later backed down in the face of protests and became deputy military law administrator. Zia signed the 12-point demand of the Revolutionary Soldiers' Organization and People's Army at 07:45 on 7 November.

But the situation changed rapidly after the coup. Zia refused to meet the demands of the soldiers. Meanwhile, Colonel Taher was also angered by Zia's indifference. Zia refused to accept Taher's secret demands.

Zia's indifference to the soldiers' demands made them suspicious of Zia. As a result, the soldiers became very angry and started killing the officers by entering their quarters. On such days, officers would be seen dramatically fleeing the cantonment wearing burqas with their families.

Forced, Zia continued to oppress the soldiers. Col. Taher was arrested and imprisoned on 24 November on charges of inciting the so-called 'elected' government installed on 7 November, the army. Rob, Jalil and other Jasad leaders were also arrested.

Taher was hanged on 21 July 1976, on 'Zia's order' in a farcical trial. He was not shown the indictment or given the opportunity to defend himself or consult with a lawyer and, aware of the farce of the trial, Sayem failed to suspend Justice Taher's death sentence. Because Zia was the main power holder in the name of Sayem. Three decades after Taher's execution, the court termed the death sentence as illegal and premeditated murder. The court observed Taher's execution had happened according to Major General Zia's plan.

=== Mass executions in armed forces ===
More than 20 military coups are reported to have taken place against Ziaur Rahman during his rule. During this time, the armed forces of Bangladesh were heavily politicised, making it susceptible to coups and mutinies. Accordingly, Zia's government faced five attempted coups between November 1975 and September 1977.

On 2 October 1977, members of the army and air force were sentenced to death by a special military tribunal formed on the orders of the then army chief General Ziaur Rahman for their involvement in the coup d'état of a section of the military in Dhaka.

Between 1,100 and 1,400 soldiers were executed by hanging or firing squad in the two months following the coup. At that time soldiers were executed only in Dhaka and Comilla Central Jails. 121 people were sentenced to death in Dhaka and 72 people in Comilla. Apart from this, more than five hundred soldiers were sentenced to various terms of imprisonment for their involvement in the incident.

Regarding the October coup, the journalist Anthony Mascarenhas mentioned in his book A Legacy of Blood,

During the next two months, 1143 soldiers were executed according to the official records of Bangladesh. In Bangladesh at that time, almost all prisoners were hanged. Almost all the progressive organizations of the country, including the international human rights organization Amnesty International, protested it at that time. Allegations were made that extrajudicial executions were being carried out without regard to any law.

A report titled "Bangladesh Executions: A Discrepancy" in The Washington Post on 10 February 1978, said,

In a secret cable sent to the State Department on January 19, 1978, the Charge d'Affaires of the American Embassy in Dhaka stated that according to his information, 217 military personnel were killed in the aftermath of the coup attempt.

Alfred E. Bergensen noted in the report,

"We think maybe 30-34 of them were executed before the military court was set up."

A report in The Sunday Times of London on 5 March 1978, said,

About 600 soldiers have been executed since last October. This blood vessel is only partially uncovered. In a report last week by Amnesty International... a former senior Air Force officer told The Sunday Times that more than 800 army personnel had been convicted in military tribunals following the coups in Bogra on 30 September and in Dhaka on 2 October. Kangaroo court is not much different from military court in some respects. About 600 army personnel have been executed by firing squad or hanging in Dhaka.

A report in the Mumbai Economic and Political Weekly on 25 March 1978, said,

Although Amnesty is only prepared to say that at least 130 people and possibly several thousand have been executed, some well-informed sources in Dhaka say the number could be as high as 700.

The then Log Area Commander Colonel MA Hamid in his book 'Tinti sena obbhutthan o kichu na bola kotha (Three Army Coups and Unsaid Things)' mentions,

"Every night from 3rd to 5th October, soldiers were taken from Army and Air Force barracks to torture camps, they never came back. All over the cantonment wails. Rolls of tears. How many soldiers, Air Force hanged, how many lives were lost, 'secret murders'." There is no account of the victims....Moreover, many soldiers died in inhumane torture after being arrested....According to official accounts, 1,143 soldiers were hanged in just two months, including 561 airmen. Even the dead bodies of the unfortunate soldiers were not given to their relatives.... Their relatives still find the dead bodies of their loved ones. No one heard their pleas, they did not get justice.... Where so many bodies were hidden is also a mystery. . Whether it was a planned assassination or a coup d'état has yet to be determined. Many believe it was a pre-planned massacre."

=== Conflict and discontent in the army ===
After Ziaur Rahman's ascension to power, there was dissatisfaction in the army due to extrajudicial firing, sentencing, killing or disappearance of army personnel, military and civilian officials in the name of suppressing coups and rebellions. Also the provision of more privileges and promotion to Pakistan-returned officers in the army, created conflict among the freedom fighter officers.

Rezaul Karim Reza, the then major of the army, said,

Ziaur Rahman gave more privileges or promotions to non-freedom fighters and army officers returning to Pakistan and appointed General Hussain Muhammad Ershad, who had returned from Pakistan, as the army chief. As a result, anger arose among the freedom fighter army officers including General Manzur and Colonel Matiur Rahman. They were demanding to remove General Ershad from the post of army chief and appoint General Manzur or any other freedom fighter officer to that position and simultaneously remove the officers who were Pakistan returnees or non-freedom fighters who were in various high positions of the army and bring freedom fighter officers to those positions.

General Ibrahim also reported receiving similar information from the accused in the military court.

However, Major Reza also said that "there were demands to remove 'pro-Pakistan' ministers including Prime Minister Shah Azizur Rahman from Ziaur Rahman's cabinet."

Colonel (retd) Shaukat Ali wrote,

"He (Zia) was on good terms with the returnees. But secretly incited the freedom fighters against the returnees. He gained the confidence of some of the officers among the returnees and in turn angered them against the freedom fighters. Early seventies. My friendship with old friends who had returned from Pakistan was intact. Their The association did not escape Zia's eyes. One day he mentioned the name of a returnee in his office and said, "Why are you so close to him? I said, he is my old friend.... Zia said seriously, 'Shaukat, any returnee officer can't be your friend.' No. It's not right for a freedom fighter like you to be close to Pakistanis'. Suddenly I got a clairvoyance. Many reasons for what happened in the army became clear to me. Of course I knew some things before. But Zia would tell me. I didn't expect it. I got a little excited and said, 'Sir, I am sorry. I cannot agree with you.... Please stop playing the game. Stop creating disunity in the army by thinking of national interest. You are the Deputy Chief of Army Staff. If you indulge in such conspiratorial activities, what will our juniors do'? After saying the words, I left. I said harsh words on purpose. Because of this, I personally had to pay a lot of losses... Later, Ziaur Rahman sitting at the top of the power, the harassing steps taken against me, are still going on."

== Planning ==
In Bangladesh: A Legacy of Blood, Anthony Mascarenhas wrote that "army officer Colonel Matiur Rahman along with many other high level military officials; hated Zia and the army brass in Dhaka, holding them responsible for the political and economic rot that was devastating the country". In September 1979, Matiur visited Lt. Colonel Mohammad Delwar Hossain, and complained about the 'wrongdoings of the government and the BNP - high prices, social injustices and corruption'.

On 25 May 1981, Matiur was visiting Dhaka, where he met his friend Lt. Colonel Mahfuzur. At the time, Mahfuzur was the Personal Staff Officer (secretary) of Zia. Mahfuzur informed Matiur about Zia's plans to transfer Major General Abul Manzur from Chittagong to Dhaka, a decision which would also affect Matiur, who was angered by this news. According to evidence presented at the trial, Matiur and Mahfuzur discussed plans to assassinate Zia. Mascarenhas claimed that "when Mafuzur also informed Moti (Matiur) that Zia had decided to visit Chittagong on the 29th, the idea for another assassination was born".

== Assassination ==
=== Preparations ===
At 11:30pm on 29 May 1981, Colonel Matiur Rahman organised a meeting with several army officers. At 2:30am on 30 May, the conspirators organised themselves into three groups. The first two groups would attack the Circuit House, where Zia was staying and the third group would shoot anyone who tried to escape. Before the attack on the Circuit House, Matiur declared "We are going to get the president today". The teams were composed of army officers as enlisted personnel refused to participate. In all there were 16 officers. They had eleven submachine guns, three Rocket Launchers and three grenade firing rifles. The main leaders of this attacking team were Lt. Colonel Matiur Rahman, Lt. Colonel Mahbub and Major Khaled.

=== Attack and death ===
At 4 am, Lieutenant Colonel Fazle Hossain started the attack by launching two rockets towards the circuit house which created two large holes in the building. During the attack, several of Ziaur Rahman's guards were killed. The officers then searched room by room for Rahman. Major Mojaffar and Captain Moslehdudin found Rahman first. Moslehuddin informed Rahman that they would take him to the cantonment. Shortly afterwards, however, Colonel Matiur Rahman arrived with another team and shot him from close range with a submachine gun.

After Zia fell down, Matiur continued shooting at Zia's head and torso, disfiguring him. One of his eyes reportedly fell out of its socket. The attack on the Circuit House lasted less than 20 minutes. After killing Zia, the conspirators returned to Chittagong Cantonment. The corpse of Ziaur Rahman and two of his guards were picked up in a military pickup van and taken elsewhere.

== Aftermath ==
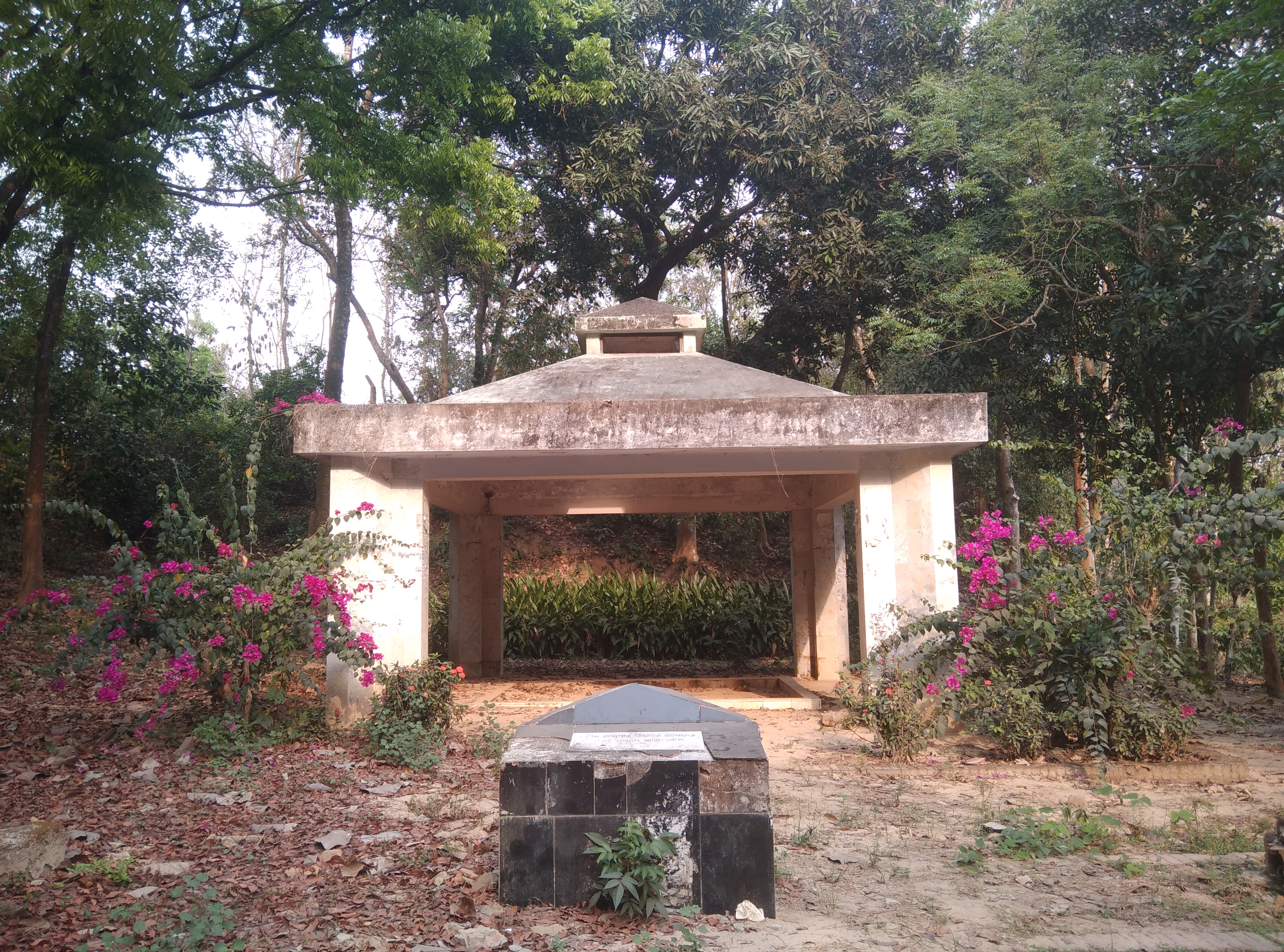
The first burial place of Ziaur Rahman in Pomra Union of Rangunia Upazila

After the assassination of Rahman on 30 May 1981, General Manzur made several speeches on Bangladesh Radio from Chittagong. In that speech, General Manzur dismissed General Ershad as Army Chief and announced General Mir Shawkat Ali as Army Chief. Besides that, by announcing the formation of revolutionary council, General Manzur called upon the freedom fighter officers to be united in the army.

Hussain Muhammad Ershad, the Chief of Army Staff, remained loyal to the government and ordered the army to suppress the coup attempt of Rahman's associates led by Major General Abul Manzur. The government ordered the rebel force to surrender and gave them a time limit. Most soldiers including officers who took part in the mission to attack in Chittagong Circuit House did surrender, and so the leading officers including GOC Manzur tried to escape towards the Chittagong Hill Tracts. On the way, they were intercepted by a force sent by the government. Colonel Matiur Rahman and Lt Colonel Mahbub (chief of 21st East Bengal, nephew of Manzur) were shot to death by Major Mannan.

General Manzur was caught at Fatikchhari by both Police and Army forces while Manzur and his wife were feeding their children inside a tea garden. However, he surrendered to the police and was taken to Hathazari thana. General Manzur requested a lawyer, which he was refused. He then asked to be sent to Chittagong jail, otherwise, he said, the army would kill him, but when he got on the police van, an army squad arrived at the prison, and, after some debate, a certain Nayeb Subadar gripped and pushed General Manzur's hand down and forced him towards the army vehicle. He was then blindfolded and his hands were tied. However, what happened afterwards was never released by the Government and was classified. The government later announced that General Manzur has been killed by unruly soldiers who were enraged after knowing that General Manzur was the key conspirator of the assassination.

Manzur's death – at first described as having been at the hands of an "enraged mob", but later shown in an autopsy report to have been via a gunshot to the back of the head – added to the mystery. The rest of the conspirators were tried in military court and given sentences ranging from the death penalty to imprisonment.

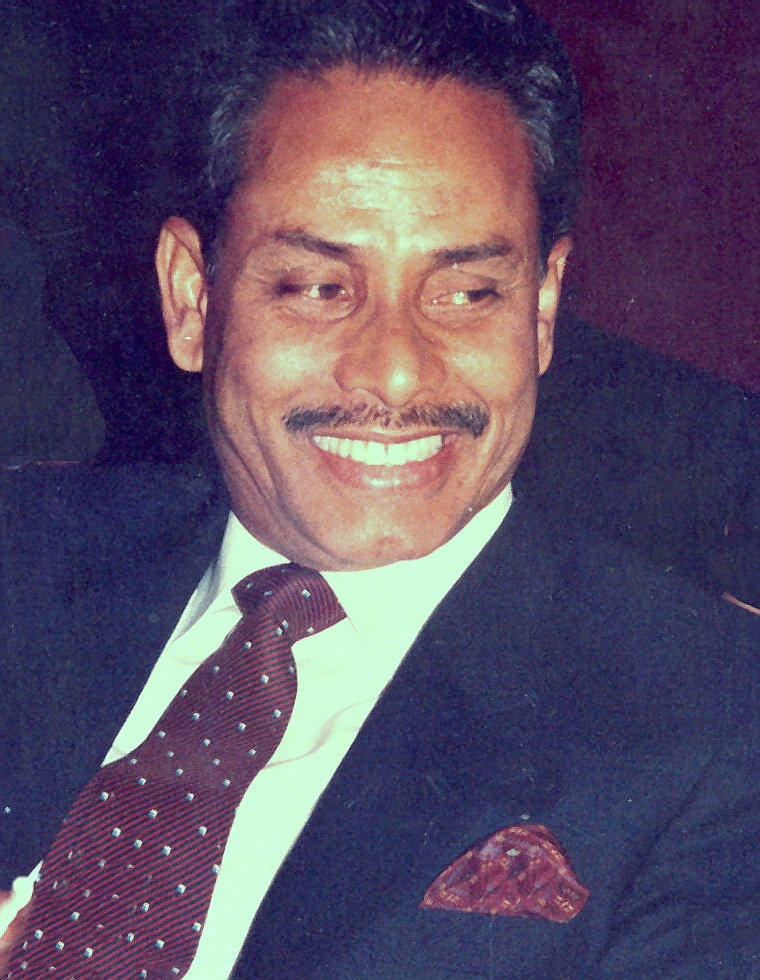
Lt. General HM Ershad, who later took power shortly after Zia's assassination

Following Rahman's death, Vice President of Bangladesh Justice Abdus Sattar became Acting President. He was elected in a popular vote in December 1981 but was deposed on 24 March 1982 by a bloodless coup by Ershad.

Twelve officers, mostly veterans, were hanged for their alleged involvement in the killing of President Rahman after a hasty trial in a military court that was completed in 18 days. The 13th officer was hanged two years later as he was being treated for bullet wounds he had received during the assassination.

Among the other assailants, Major Khaled and Major Mojaffar escaped. Captain Moslehuddin was caught and sentenced to life in prison. However, as of 2010, he is in the United States. One of the accused of Rahman's murder case, Captain (Rtd.) Giasuddin Ahmed later became an Awami League member of National parliament from Gaffargaon Upazila, Mymensingh District. He died of natural causes in 2022.

In his book Amar Fashi Chai, Motiur Rahman Rentu claimed that Sheikh Hasina had involvement in the assassination. During Sheikh Hasina's later rule, the book was banned.

== Court martial ==
Eighteen officers were brought before a military tribunal. Thirteen were sentenced to death whilst five were given varying prison sentences. The officers were arrested between 1 and 3 June 1981 and a court martial, chaired by Major General Abdur Rahman began at Chittagong Central Jail on 10 July 1981 and ended on 28 July 1981. Twelve officers were executed. Major General Abdur Rahman, a Pakistan returned officer, was later sent to France in 1983/84 as ambassador, dying there mysteriously; his family claimed General Rahman was killed by the government of Bangladesh.

=== Executed officers ===
1. Brigadier Mohsin Uddin Ahmed
2. Colonel Nawajesh Uddin
3. Colonel M Abdur Rashid
4. Lt Colonel AYM Mahfuzur Rahman
5. Lt Colonel M Delwar Hossain
6. Lt Colonel Shah Md Fazle Hossain
7. Major AZ Giashuddin Ahmed
8. Major Rawshan Yazdani Bhuiyan
9. Major Kazi Mominul Haque
10. Major Mujibur Rahman
11. Captain Mohammad Abdus Sattar
12. Captain Jamil Haque
13. Lieutenant Mohammad Rafiqul Hassan Khan

(Rafiq later claimed he was on a mission under orders from his superior officer, without knowledge of the mission.) The army prosecutors, who were appointed to defend these thirteen suspected officers later called the trial a 'farcical trial' as they all were denied the minimal opportunity to defend themselves.

=== Sentenced to prison ===
1. Lt Mosleh Uddin. (life sentence, as of 2010 was living in the USA)

Uddin was the younger brother of Brigadier Mohsin Uddin Ahmed, who was sentenced to be executed. As the elder brother was sentenced to die, the younger brother was not given a death sentence.

=== Expelled officers ===
The following officers were removed from the army.

1. Brigadier Abu Said Matiul Hannan Shah
2. Brigadier AKM Azizul Islam
3. Brigadier Gias Uddin Ahmed Chowdhury (Bir Bikram)
4. Brigadier Abu Jafar Aminul Huque (Bir Bikram)
5. Colonel Md. Bajlul Goni Patwari (Bir Protik)
6. Lt. Colonel AS Enamul Huque
7. Lt. Colonel Md. Jainul Abedin
8. Lt. Colonel Md. Abdul Hannan (Bir Protik)
9. Major Manjur Ahmed (Bir Protik)
10. Major Wakar Hassan (Bir Protik)
11. Major Md. Abdul Jalil
12. Major Rafiqul Islam
13. Major Md. Abdus Salam
14. Major AKM Rezaul Islam (Bir Protik)
15. Major Md. Asaduzzaman
16. Captain Jahirul Huque Khan (Bir Protik)
17. Captain Majharul Huque
18. Captain ASM Abdul Hai
19. Captain Ilyas (was in Rajshahi jail with Brig. Mohsin)
20. Lt. Abul Hashem

=== Fugitives ===
1. Major S.M. Khaled (died, 1993)
2. Major Mozaffar Hossain (On 16 July 2026, Mozzaffar was arrested from Banani DOHS, Dhaka area)

== See also ==
- 1977 Bangladesh Air Force mutiny
- 1982 Bangladesh coup d'état
- Assassination of Sheikh Mujibur Rahman
- Bangladesh: A Legacy of Blood
- Deyal
