= Jamil Haque =

Bangladeshi assassin

- Born: 19 September 1956; Rawalpindi, Pakistan
- Died: 23 September 1981 (aged 25); Chittagong Central Jail, Bangladesh
- Burial place: Nasirabad, Chittagong
- Military career
- Allegiance: Bangladesh
- Branch: Bangladesh Army
- Service years: 1976–1981
- Rank: Captain
- Unit: East Bengal Regiment
- Commands: Adjutant of 10th East Bengal Regiment
- Known for: Assassination of Ziaur Rahman

Jamil Haque (19 September 1956 – 23 September 1981) was a captain in the Bangladesh Army who was executed for his involvement in the assassination of President Ziaur Rahman.

== Career ==
Jamil Haque was born on 19 September 1956, in Rawalpindi, Pakistan. He studied at Quetta, Peshawar, and Mymensingh Cadet Colleges and joined the Bangladesh Army in November 1975. He was commissioned the following year. Jamil got married on 21 April 1976 and had one son.

=== Assassination of Ziaur Rahman ===
At 11:30 pm on 29 May 1981, Lt. Colonel Matiur Rahman and Lt. Colonel Mehboob held a meeting, which Captain Jamil attended. At this meeting, Matiur brought out a Quran and said

This is the Holy Quran. Whatever we are doing, we are doing in the interest of our country, our people and for justice. Those of you who are with us will touch the Holy Quran and promise to do what is necessary. Those of you who are not with us may leave the room. But my only request to them is not to tell about this thing to the others.

All the officers present, including Jamil, took the oath and then changed into uniforms and armed themselves. At 2:30 am on 30 May 1981, the conspirators organised three teams. The first two teams were to attack the Circuit House, where Zia was staying, and the third team was to shoot anyone trying to escape. Jamil was in the first strike team, along with Lt. Colonel Mehboob, Major Khalid, Captain Abdus Sattar, and Lieutenant Rafiqul. During the attack on the Circuit House, Jamil was accidentally shot by members of the second strike team. Despite his injuries, Jamil managed to shoot and wound Naik Rafiqul Uddin, the personal bodyguard of Zia.

After Zia was killed, Jamil Haque and Lt. Colonel Fazle, who was also wounded, were taken to the Combined Military Hospital in Chittagong. When the other conspirators were escaping, Major Khaled picked up Fazle and Jamil from the hospital. However, the journey was too much for the pair, and Major Khalid abandoned them at Faikchari, where they were arrested.

== Death ==
Jamil was hanged on 23 September 1981, at Chittagong Prison. He was buried at Garibullah Shah Cemetery in Chittagong.
