= Matiur Rahman (officer, born 1950) =

Bangladeshi army officer (1950–1981)

- Born: 17 September 1950; Jhenaidah, East Pakistan, Pakistan
- Died: 1 June 1981 (aged 30); Chittagong, Bangladesh
- Cause of death: Gunshot wound
- Alma mater: PAF College Lower Topa
- Spouse: Farhana Rahman
- Children: 1
- Military career
- Allegiance: Pakistan (Before 1971); Bangladesh
- Branch: Pakistan Army; Mukti Bahini; Bangladesh Army
- Service years: 1967–1981
- Rank: Lieutenant Colonel
- Unit: East Bengal Regiment
- Commands: Sub-Commander of Sector – VI; CO of 10th East Bengal Regiment
- Known for: Assassination of Ziaur Rahman
- Conflicts: Bangladesh Liberation War
- Awards: Bir Bikrom

Matiur Rahman, also known as Motiur Rahman, (17 September 1950 – 1 June 1981) was a lieutenant colonel in the Bangladesh Army who was involved in the assassination of President Ziaur Rahman on 30 May 1981. He is believed to be the one to have shot and killed Ziaur Rahman. Matiur was subsequently killed in a shootout with troops loyal to the government on 1 June 1981.

== Bangladesh Liberation War ==
During the Bangladesh Liberation War, Matiur was a sub-sector commander in sector 6.

== Assassination of Ziaur Rahman ==
=== Plotting against Ziaur Rahman ===
In Bangladesh: A Legacy of Blood, Anthony Mascarenhas wrote that Matiur "hated Zia and the army brass in Dhaka, holding them responsible for the political and economic rot that was devastating the country". In September 1979, Matiur visited Lt. Colonel Mohammad Delwar Hossain and complained about the 'wrongdoings of the government and the BNP - high prices, social injustices and corruption'.

On 25 May 1981, Matiur was visiting Dhaka, where he met his friend Lt. Colonel Mahfuzur. At the time, Mahfuzur was the personal staff officer (secretary) of Zia. Mahfuzur informed Matiur about Zia's plans to transfer Major General Abul Manzoor from Chittagong to Dhaka, a decision that would also affect Matiur, who was angered by this news. According to evidence presented at the trial, Matiur and Mahfuzur discussed plans to assassinate Zia. Mascarenhas claimed that "when Mafuzur also informed Moti (Matiur) that Zia had decided to visit Chittagong on the 29th, the idea for another assassination was born".

=== Attacking the Circuit House ===
At 11:30pm on 29 May 1981, Matiur organised a meeting with several army officers, where he brought out a Quran and said

This is the Holy Quran. Whatever we are doing, we are doing in the interest of our country, our people and for justice. Those of you who are with us will touch the Holy Quran and promise to do what is necessary. Those of you who are not with us may leave the room. But my only request to them is not to tell about this thing to the others.

At 2:30am on 30 May 1981, the conspirators organised themselves into three groups. The first two groups would attack the Circuit House, where Zia was staying, and the third group would shoot anyone who tried to escape. Before the attack on the Circuit House, Matiur declared, "We are going to get the president today". The teams were composed of army officers, as enlisted personnel refused to participate.

Matiur was part of the two strike teams that entered the Circuit House to kill the president. During the attack, several of Ziaur Rahman's guards were killed, and two members of the strike team were accidentally shot and injured by their own men. When Zia came out of Room 4, Major Muzaffar and Lieutenant Mosleuddin were closest to him. Lieutenant Mosleuddin told Zia, "Don't worry. Nothing to be afraid of sir".

Matiur, allegedly drunk at the time, used his submachine gun to kill Zia. After Zia fell down, Matiur continued shooting at Zia's head and torso, disfiguring him. One of his eyes reportedly fell out of its socket. The attack on the Circuit House lasted less than 20 minutes. After killing Zia, the conspirators returned to Chittagong Cantonment.

== Death ==
On 1 June 1981, the army officers involved in Zia's assassination went on the run in a convoy of vehicles. Matiur and Lt. Colonel Mehboob were in the lead vehicle, which got split from the rest of the convoy. Matiur came across a column of soldiers who were loyal to the government. When these soldiers tried to arrest Matiur, he opened fire, killing a subedar. Matiur and Mehboob were killed during the shootout. The Dhaka Tribune described the shootout as "mysterious". Q. M. Jalal Khan wrote in his book, President Ziaur Rahman: Legendary Leader of Bangladesh, that the officers were executed on the orders of Army Chief General Hussain Muhammad Ershad.
