= Rawshan Yazdani Bhuiyan =

Major Rawshan Yazdani Bhuiyan (died 1981) was a Bangladeshi freedom fighter. He was accused by the Government of Bangladesh of taking part in the assassination of president Ziaur Rahman and was hanged in 1981.

== Life ==
Rawshan Yazdani Bhuiyan graduated from Faujdarhat Cadet College and further attended Bangladesh Agricultural University, Mymensingh. However, during the Bangladesh liberation war in 1971, he joined the liberation war and after the independence of Bangladesh, he was given a commission in the Bangladesh Army. As he had joined the army much later, he was still a Major when his college classmates were already Colonels or Brigadiers in the army. He was arrested for his role in the assassination of Ziaur Rahman, whilst in the company of the deceased Abul Manzoor's spouse and family. Rowshan was found guilty by Military Tribunal and hung (see Assassination of Ziaur Rahman).
