= Mohsin Uddin Ahmed =

Bangladeshi military officer

- মহসীন উদ্দীন আহমেদ
- Born: 24 December 1939; Sreenagar, Bengal, British India
- Died: 23 September 1981 (aged 41); Rajshahi Central Jail, Rajshahi, Bangladesh
- Burial place: Banani gravyard
- Military career
- Allegiance: Bangladesh; Pakistan (Before 1971)
- Branch: Bangladesh Army; Pakistan Army
- Service years: 1965–1981
- Rank: Brigadier General; Service number: BA–185
- Unit: East Bengal Regiment
- Commands: Commander of 69th Infantry Brigade; Commander of 71st Infantry Brigade; CO of 3rd East Bengal Regiment
- Conflicts: Bangladesh Liberation War: Battle of Tengratila
- Awards: Bir Bikrom

Mohsin Uddin Ahmed BB, psc (Bengali: মহসীন উদ্দীন আহমেদ) was a brigadier general of the Bangladesh Army and recipient of Bir Bikrom, the third highest gallantry award of Bangladesh, for his actions during the Bangladesh Liberation War. He was the most senior official of the Bangladesh Army executed for the assassination of Ziaur Rahman.

== Early life ==
Ahmed was born on 24 December 1939 in Sreenagar Upazila, Bikrampur District, East Bengal, British India. His father was Mohiuddin Ahmed, and mother was Begum Nurunnahar. He was married to Hosne Ara. While doing his master's in geography, he joined the Pakistan Army in 1963.

== Career ==
Ahmed received his commission in the 3rd East Bengal Regiment of the Pakistan Army in 1965.

On 26 March 1971, Ahmed was the adjutant of the East Bengal Center in Chittagong District when Operation Searchlight was launched by the Pakistan Army. He deserted the army and fought for Bangladesh in the Bangladesh Liberation War. He served in the 3rd East Bengal of the Z forces commanded by Major Ziaur Rahman. He commanded a company during the war based in India. He fought a number of skirmishes during the war, most notably at Tengratila in Sunamganj District. He received Bir Bikrom for his role in the war. He was promoted to brigadier in 1978.

== Death ==
Ahmed was serving as the commander of the 69th Infantry Brigade in Chittagong when the assassination of Ziaur Rahman, president of Bangladesh, took place in Chittagong on 30 May 1981. He was arrested on 2 June, tried in a court martial by Major General Abdur Rahman, and executed on 23 September 1981 in Rajshahi Central Jail. The prosecutors at the trial were Colonel A.M.S.A. Amin, Lieutenant Colonel Abu Nayeem Amin Ahmed, and Brigadier General Nazirul Aziz Chishti. His defence team was composed of Brigadier General M. Anwar Hossain, Colonel Mohammad Ainuddin, and Lieutenant Colonel Syed Muhammad Ibrahim. The trial lasted 17 days, after which 12 officers were hanged. He was buried in Banani graveyard.
