= Ferdous Hasan Salim =

Major General in the Bangladesh Army

Ferdous Hasan Selim
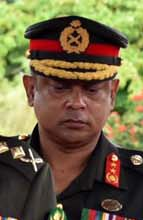
- Military career
- Allegiance: Bangladesh
- Service years: 1992-present
- Rank: Major General
- Unit: East Bengal Regiment
- Commands: GOC of 24th Infantry Division; Commandant at the East Bengal Regimental Centre; Military Secretary to the Chief Advisor (MSCA); Commandant of the School of Infantry and Tactics

Ferdous Hasan Selim is a two-star general of the Bangladesh Army. He is currently serving as GOC of the 24th Division and the Chittagong Area Commander. Previously, he served as the military secretary to Chief Advisor Muhammad Yunus.

== Military career ==
Ferdous was commissioned in the 27th BMA Long Course in the Corps of Infantry on 20 December 1992. Ferdous won the Sword of Honour for best all-round performance amongst the officer cadets of his course in Bangladesh Military Academy. He also won the Osmani Gold Medal in BMA for the best academic performance.

In 2023, Selim was promoted to major general, and he was made commandant of the School of Infantry and Tactics. Later on, he served as commandant at the East Bengal Regimental Centre. In 2026, as part of a wider re-shuffle, he was made GOC of the 24th Division and commander of the Chittagong Area.
