= Zia Memorial Museum =

Museum in Chittagong, Bangladesh

- জিয়া স্মৃতি জাদুঘর
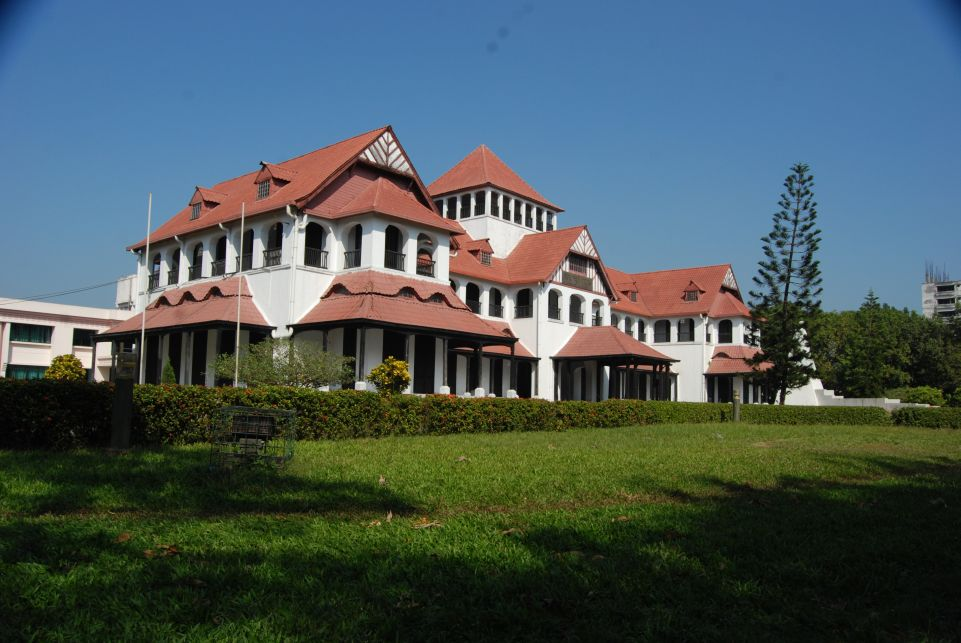
- Museum building
- Interactive map of the Zia Memorial Museum area

General information
- Type: Circuit house (1913–1993); Museum (1993–present)
- Location: Shahid Saifuddin Khaled Road, Kazir Dewri, Chittagong, Bangladesh
- Coordinates: 22.3482315°N 91.8238808°E
- Completed: 1913
- Client: British Raj
- Owner: Bangladesh National Museum

Technical details
- Floor count: 2

Website
- ziamuseum.org.bd

Zia Memorial Museum, also known as Old Circuit House, was a circuit house building, in Chittagong, Bangladesh. Ziaur Rahman, the seventh president of Bangladesh, was assassinated in the building in 1981. Today it is a museum.

== History ==
In 1913, the British Raj authority established the circuit house in Chittagong which was used as a residential building for government officials. Seven years after the establishment of the state of Pakistan, on 5 June 1954, the newly established broadcasting center of Radio Pakistan in the city started its journey from this building. During the liberation war in 1971, the Pakistan Army chose Chittagong Circuit House as their military base. They converted several rooms of the building into torture cells. They used to torture Bengalis in these rooms. From the circuit house area later skeleton skulls of some freedom fighters who were tortured by electric shock in this building were found. Moreover, girls were raped and tortured in this building. Raped girls were killed by the Pakistani army when they became pregnant. The bodies of the victims were later thrown into the well adjacent to the area. On 17 December 1971, after the day of the surrender of the Pakistani army and the liberation of Chittagong, the flag of Pakistan on the flagpole of the Circuit House building was lowered and the flag of Bangladesh was flown by Rafiqul Islam. At that time people gathered in front of Circuit House to welcome the freedom fighters.

In 1981, President Ziaur Rahman, founder of Bangladesh Nationalist Party, reached the Circuit House building on 29 May to resolve a dispute between the leaders of the local wing of the BNP. At that time, Colonel Matiur Rahman planned to capture Ziaur Rahman and bring him to Chittagong Cantonment to demand the demotion of Hussain Muhammad Ershad who was the then army chief of Bangladesh Army, and the army officers who had not participated in the 1971 war on their behalf and returned from Pakistan after the liberation war. For that purpose, on the night of 30 May, when the soldiers supported by Colonel Matiur Rahman and Lieutenant Colonel Mehbubur Rahman advanced towards the circuit house building, a fight started between Zia's security forces and them. At one stage the attackers forcibly took Ziaur Rahman out of a room in the building and Colonel Matiur Rahman shot him dead.

Four days after Ziaur Rahman's death, a proposal to make the building a museum was approved by the ministry of Abdus Sattar. It was then inaugurated during the First Khaleda ministry on 6 September 1993. The museum is currently closed. As of 2025, the museum's building is in vulnerable state as the government had not released funds for its maintenance and renovation for the last 15 years. It was declared closed on 2 December 2025, after cracks appeared in the building due to aftershocks from the 2025 Bangladesh earthquake. On 20 March 2026, the Minister of Finance and Planning announced the renovation of the museum building.

== Description ==
Here Ziaur Rahman's complete life is presented in 17 galleries that saw at least 150 visitors to the museum daily. The museum preserves the site where Ziaur Rahman was killed and the wall where the bullet hit when Colonel shot Zia. There is a replica of his mausoleum, his personal belongings and the stretcher that carried Zia's body. The microphone used by M. A. Hannan and Zia to broadcast the Proclamation of Bangladeshi Independence at the Kalurghat Radio Center is preserved in this museum.

== Controversy ==
On 11 February 2019, Awami League politician Mohibul Hasan Chowdhury expressed the desire to rename the museum to Liberation War Memorial Museum. He felt that the building is a witness to the torture of victims by the Pakistani army during the liberation war and that's why its name needs to be changed to show the people the real contribution of the building to history. Khandkar Mosharraf Hossain, a politician of Bangladesh Nationalist Party, opposed his proposal. The next day, a group of members of Bangladesh Chhatra League and Jubo League erased Zia's name from the signboard of the museum and hung a picture of Mohibul there. They then organized a human chain in the museum area.

On 6 September 2021, Murad Hasan, the then Information Minister, said that the museum would be moved from its current location and the building would be converted back into its former state and the microphone housed in the museum would be sent to Kalurghat radio centre building. On 28 October of that year, AKM Mozammel Haque, the Liberation War Affairs Minister, said in a meeting that official documents related to the conversion of Chittagong Circuit House into Zia Memorial Museum could not be found. He also announced a plan to its removal from its current location and build a new bigger museum and also assured to discuss with the administration how to preserve the existing museum building.

On 4 May 2022, Mohibul said in an event that although many efforts were made to change its name, the Ministry of Culture did not take initiative to change the name. He called upon the Swachhasebak League to conduct the mass signature process for the purpose of changing the name. A week after this, the mass signature program was held. Three days later, Chhatra League staged a human chain in Chittagong demanding the name of Zia Memorial Museum be changed to Freedom Fighters Museum. On 22 June 2022, the leaders of the Chittagong metropolitan section of the Bangladesh Nationalist Party demanded that the museum be opened to all, which has been closed for several days so far.
