= Rafiqul Hassan Khan =

Bangladeshi army officer

- Born: c. 1958; Meherpur, East Pakistan, Pakistan
- Died: 23 September 1981 (aged 23); Jessore Central Jail, Khulna, Bangladesh
- Burial place: Meherpur, Khulna
- Military career
- Allegiance: Bangladesh
- Branch: Bangladesh Army
- Service years: 1978–1981
- Rank: Lieutenant
- Unit: East Bengal Regiment
- Known for: Assassination of Ziaur Rahman
- Conflicts: Bangladesh Liberation War
- Awards: Bir Protik

Rafiqul Hassan Khan BP (1958 – 23 September 1981) was a Bangladeshi army officer who was executed for his alleged involvement in the assassination of President Ziaur Rahman.

== Career ==
=== Early life and Bangladesh Liberation War ===
Raifqul Hasan Khan was born in 1958 in Meherpur of Kushtia district. He was a student at Jhenaidah Cadet College when the Bangladesh Liberation War began in 1971. Aged 13, he participated in the war alongside his father, Mohammad Hashem Ali Khan. Rafiqul and his father stayed at a camp in Nadia, West Bengal.

Rafiqul joined the Bangladesh Army on 25 July 1977 and was commissioned on 18 July 1978, being assigned to the 6 East Bengal Regiment.

=== Assassination of Ziaur Rahman ===
On 29 May 1981, Lt. Colonel Shah Mohammad Fazle Hossain called Lieutenant Rafiqul to his office, where he asked Rafiqul, "Will you go anywhere that I go?" Rafiqul replied, "If you order me, sir".

At 2:30 am on 30 May 1981, the conspirators organised three teams. The first two teams were to attack the Circuit House, where Zia was staying, and the third team was to shoot anyone trying to escape. Rafiqul was in the first strike team, along with Lt. Colonel Fazle, Lt. Colonel Mehboob, Major Khalid, Captain Jamil Haque, and Captain Abdus Sattar. On the way to the Circuit House, Lieutenant Rafiqul asked Lt. Colonel Fazle, "Are you going to kill the president?" Fazle replied, "No, we will only get him".

After the assassination, the acting president, Abdus Sattar, announced that those who crossed the Shuvapur Bridge before 12 pm on 31 May 1981 would be pardoned. Later the chief of army staff, General Hussain Muhammad Ershad, extended the amnesty by another 18 hours. While the amnesty was in force, Rafiq surrendered at the provisional headquarters of the 44 Infantry Brigade in Feni.

== Death ==
Rafiqul was hanged on 23 September 1981, at the age of 23, in Jessore Prison.

In his final letter to his friend Zia (not to be confused with Ziaur Rahman), he wrote

When I received my "execution order" on 11th August (1981) the only thing that came to my mind was "Alhamdullilah". I am innocent in my mind. I've accepted this as a victim of circumstances. You probably know also I loved Zia. Since the 11th of August I'm waiting for my death, anytime. I am firmly convinced that I have come to this death cell, which nobody ever thought of in their wildest nightmares. Certainly all this is Allah's desire. Where I was planning to meet you and now I am here. Let the yearning for everything disappear. Call Auntie on 382744 and give her my greetings. For the time being there can be no reunion. Only Allah knows when we shall meet, again. Get married and lead a holy life. Wishing you all types of happiness, affection and greetings. I, Lt. Rafiqul Hasan Khan
