= 24th Infantry Division (Bangladesh) =

Division of the Bangladesh army

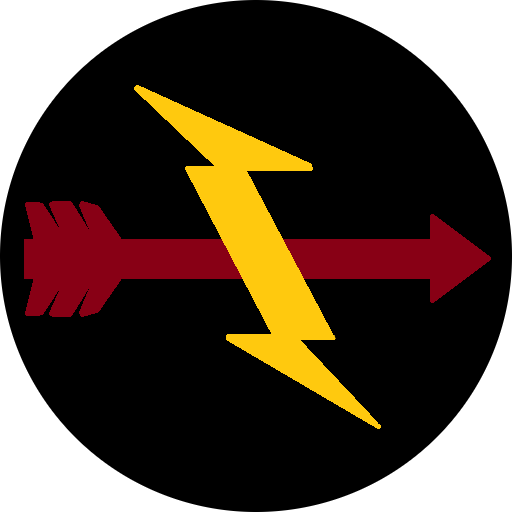
- Insignia of 24th Infantry Division
- Active: 1976—present
- Country: Bangladesh
- Branch: Bangladesh Army
- Type: Infantry
- Size: Division
- Garrison/HQ: Chittagong Cantonment

Commanders
- Current commander: Major General Ferdous Hasan Salim
- Notable commanders: Major General Atiqur Rahman; Major General Abul Manzoor; Major General Iqbal Karim Bhuiyan; Major General Mainur Rahman

The 24th Infantry Division is a formation of the Bangladesh Army, headquartered in Chittagong Cantonment, Chittagong District. The division covers the Chittagong Hill Tracts.

== History ==
=== Assassination of Ziaur Rahman ===
On 29 May 1981, Zia went on tour to Chittagong to help resolve an intra-party political dispute in the regional BNP. Zia and his entourage stayed overnight at the Chittagong Circuit House. In the early hours of the morning of 30 May, he was assassinated by a group of army officers led by GOC of the 24th Infantry Division Major General Abul Manzoor. Also killed were six of his bodyguards and two aides.

Manzoor surrendered and was killed shortly thereafter while being transported. Eighteen officers were brought before a military tribunal; 13 were sentenced to death, while 5 were given varying prison sentences after a hasty trial.

=== Chittagong Hill Tracts conflict ===
The Chittagong Hill Tracts Conflict was the political conflict and armed struggle between the government of Bangladesh and the Parbatya Chattagram Jana Sanghati Samiti (United People's Party of the Chittagong Hill Tracts) and its armed wing, the Shanti Bahini, over the issue of autonomy and the rights of the tribes of the Chittagong Hill Tracts.

The Shanti Bahini launched an insurgency against government forces in 1977. The 24th Infantry Division took part in a counter-insurgency operation. The conflict continued for twenty years until the government and the PCJSS signed the Chittagong Hill Tracts Peace Accord in 1997. In February 1998, Shantu Larma formally disbanded the Shanti Bahini. Almost 1,500 fighters surrendered their weapons. According to official figures, more than 8,500 rebels, soldiers, and civilians were killed during two decades of insurgency.

== Components ==
- 24th Artillery Brigade (Guimara Cantonment)
- 69th Infantry Brigade (Bandarban Cantonment)
- 203rd Infantry Brigade (Khagrachari Cantonment)
- 305th Infantry Brigade (Rangamati Cantonment)
