= Muhammed Abul Manzur =

Bangladeshi military officer (1940–1981)

- Born: 24 February 1940; Gupinathpur, Bengal Presidency, British India
- Died: 1 June 1981 (aged 41); Chittagong, Bangladesh
- Alma mater: Pakistan Military Academy
- Spouse: Rana Yasmeen Manzur
- Children: 4
- Military career
- Allegiance: Pakistan (until 1971); Bangladesh
- Branch: Pakistan Army; Mukti Bahini; Bangladesh Army
- Service years: 1958 – 1981
- Rank: Major General
- Unit: East Bengal Regiment
- Commands: Commander of Sector – VIII; Commander of Sector – IX; CO of 1st Para Commando Regiment; Chief of General Staff; GOC of 24th Infantry Division
- Conflicts: Bangladesh Liberation War; Battle of Shiromoni; Chittagong Hill Tracts Conflict; Assassination of Ziaur Rahman
- Awards: Bir Uttom; Maroon Parachute Wing

Muhammed Abul Manzur (24 February 1940 – 1 June 1981) was a Bangladeshi military officer who commanded the Bangladesh Forces operations in Sector 8 during the Bangladesh Liberation War against Pakistan in 1971. He was allegedly involved in the assassination of the then-president of Bangladesh, Ziaur Rahman. Former prime minister Khaleda Zia (President Ziaur's widow) accused Hussain Muhammad Ershad of orchestrating President Ziaur's assassination as well as Manzur's murder. In 1995, Manzur's older brother filed a case to investigate Manzur's murder, with Ershad named as the prime suspect in the case. He had been awarded the Bir Uttam by the Bangladeshi government for his actions in the Bangladesh Liberation War. At the time of his death, he was the general officer commanding (GOC) of the 24th Infantry Division headquartered at Chittagong.

== Early life ==
Manzur was born on 24 February 1940 into a Bengali Muslim family in the village of Gupinathpur in the Bengal Presidency of British India (now in Brahmanbaria District, Bangladesh). His ancestral paternal home was in the village of Kamalpur in Chatkhil, Noakhali. (Note: Sources vary with regard to exactly where he was born. Franda says his birthplace was Krishnanagar in what is now West Bengal, India. Banglapedia places his birth at Gopinathpur village of Comilla District, now in Kasba Upazila of Brahmanbaria District, Bangladesh.) He was a student in Calcutta before enrolling at the Armanitola Government High School in Dacca at class five. He moved to attend school in PAF College Sargodha in first entry (54, Tempest), Punjab, West Pakistan, and passed the Senior Cambridge and ISc examinations in 1955 and 1956, respectively. Manzur earned an intermediate degree from the Sargodha Air Force Cadet College and studied at Dacca University in East Pakistan for a year.

== Military career ==
Following his graduation, Manzur joined the Pakistani Army, subsequently attending the Pakistan Military Academy and the Defence Services Staff College in Canada, where he obtained his PSC in 1968 and joined the East Bengal Regiment of the Pakistan Army as a commissioned officer.

After the War of Liberation began in 1971, Manzur was a brigade major of a para commando brigade close to the Indian border. He escaped from West Pakistan to India with Major Abu Taher, Major Mohammad Ziauddin, and Captain Bazlul Ghani Patwari and with his family. From there, they made their way to Bangladesh, and Manzur joined up with fellow officers from East Bengal. He quickly became a prominent officer within the ranks and won many battles in his sector. He commanded Sector – VIII during the Liberation War from September 1971 to victory in December 1971.

In 1974–76, he was posted in New Delhi as military attaché in the High Commission of Bangladesh to India. Known for his tenacity, keen eye for strategy, and formation of loyalty from colleagues, in 1975 he was promoted to colonel. Upon his return to Dhaka in March 1977, he was promoted to brigadier general. After the 1977 Bangladesh Airforce Mutiny, Manzur succeeded his colleague and rival major general Mir Shawkat Ali as the Chief of the General Staff on October 1977. He suggested that the air force should have a limited potentiality or be restructured as a directorate under the newly Bangladesh Army Aviation Group. In March 1980, he was promoted to major general at the age of 41, making him as one of the youngest flag officer in South Asia's history.

In December 1980, Manzur was appointed as the GOC of 24th Infantry Division and area commander, Chittagong area. Lieutenant general Hussain Muhammad Ershad, then chief of army staff, soon gave a transfer order to Manzur to a non-combatant post in Dhaka as commandant of the Defence Services Command and Staff College around March 1981. This put him in direct opposition to president Ziaur Rahman, as he wanted to stay in an operational assignment. He appealed his posting order to army headquarters, but was denied, as Rahman wanted to separate him and Mir Shawkat Ali from being at the same regional installations. His then divisional adjutant and quartermaster, lieutenant colonel Anwar Hossain Chowdhury recalled that, Manzur also expressed frustration about the military bureaucracy and his fellow compatriots during the war were given the preferable appointments.

== Role in assassination of Ziaur Rahman ==
Manzur launched a rebellion in the morning of 30 May, and ordered the assassination of president Ziaur Rahman at the then Chittagong Circuit House. After an ultimatum for surrender by the government, most of Manzur's troops had abandoned their posts or consolidated with the government, which ended the rebellion. Later, government soldiers retook the radio station, and Bangladesh Radio announced a 500,000 taka reward for capture -dead or alive- of Manzoor.

Although the assassination of President Ziaur Rahman was carried out in Chittagong on 30 May 1981, the military coup d'état failed. Manzur went on radio to speak to the nation. According to the historian Anthony Mascarenhas in his Bangladesh: A Legacy of Blood, Manzoor effectively isolated Chittagong from the rest of the country. Chief of Army Staff, Lieutenant General Hussain Muhammad Ershad, quickly ordered to suppress any such action and issued orders to kill or capture Manzur. He surrendered without incident to the police in Fatikchari. Manzur was reported to have been killed on spot by angry soldiers on 2 June 1981. Other reports say he was killed in Chittagong Cantonment by an army officer sent from Dhaka. In less than a year, Ershad took over the country in a bloodless coup.

== Trial ==
On 28 February 1995, Manzur's elder brother, Abul, filed a murder case with Panchlaish Police Station 14 years after his killing. Jatiya Party Chairman HM Ershad was made the prime accused in the case. Other accused are Maj (retired) Kazi Emdadul Haque, Lt Col (retired) Mostafa Kamaluddin Bhuiyan, Lieutenant Colonel (retired) Shams, and Major General (retired) Abdul Latif.

== Family and legacy ==
Manzur's widow, Rana Yasmeen Manzur and their two daughters and two sons received political asylum in the US. He was considered a war hero as Sector 8 commander in the Liberation War. Manzur's daughter Karishma is a candidate in the 2026 United States Senate election in New Hampshire.
