= Ziaur Rahman =

President of Bangladesh from 1977 to 1981

Shaheed President Ziaur Rahman BU
- জিয়াউর রহমান
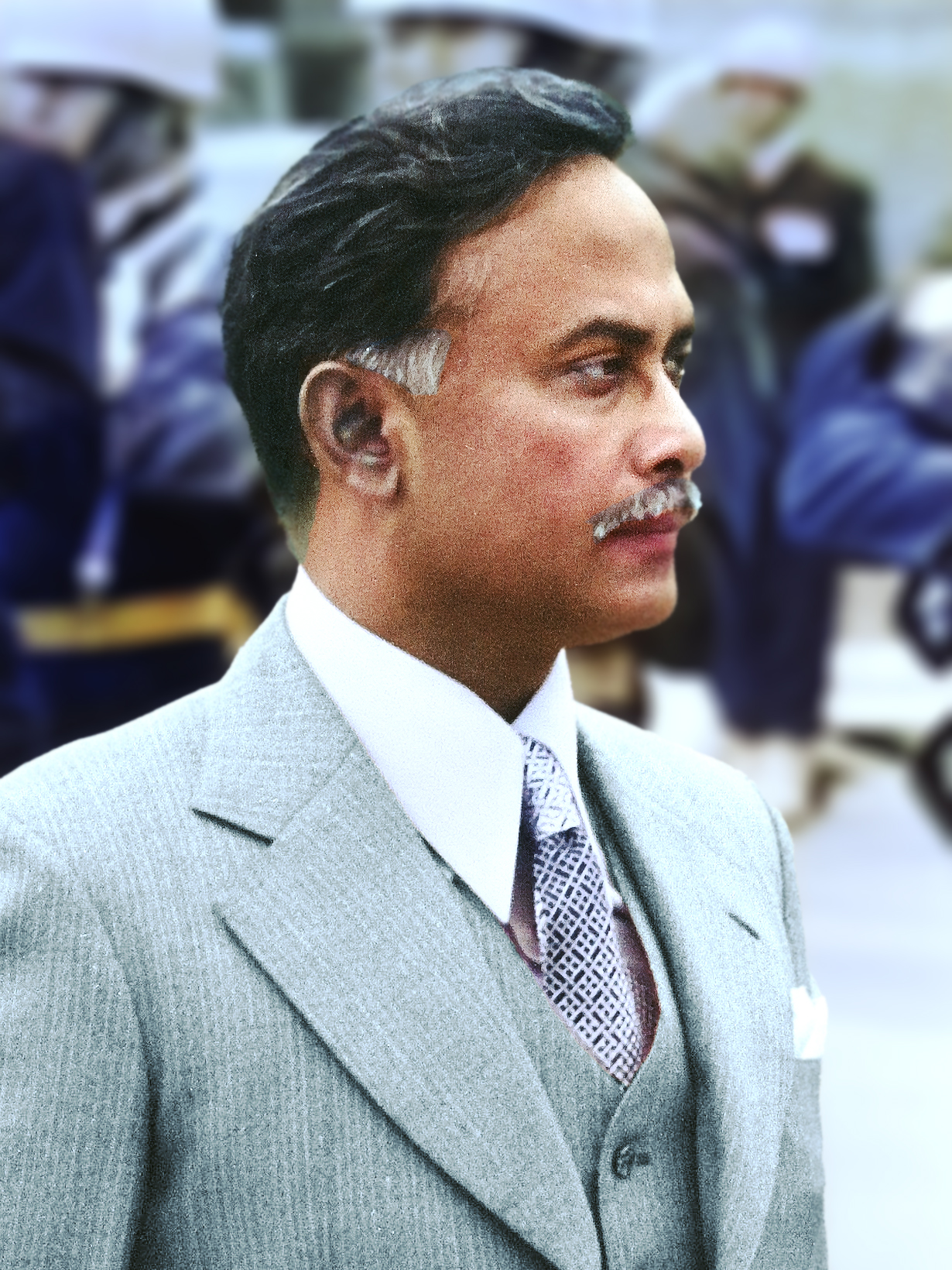
- Rahman in 1979

President of Bangladesh
- In office 21 April 1977 – 30 May 1981
- Prime Minister: Mashiur Rahman; Shah Azizur Rahman
- Vice President: Abdus Sattar
- Preceded by: Abu Sadat Mohammad Sayem
- Succeeded by: Abdus Sattar

3rd Chief Martial Law Administrator
- In office 29 September 1976 – 9 April 1979
- President: Abu Sadat Mohammad Sayem
- Preceded by: Abu Sadat Mohammad Sayem
- Succeeded by: Hussain Muhammad Ershad (1982)

Deputy Chief Martial Law Administrator
- In office 8 November 1975 – 29 September 1976
- Chief Martial Law Administrator: Abu Sadat Mohammad Sayem
- Preceded by: Position established
- Succeeded by: Position abolished

Chairman of the Bangladesh Nationalist Party
- In office 1 September 1978 – 30 May 1981
- Secretary: A. Q. M. Badruddoza Chowdhury
- Preceded by: Position established
- Succeeded by: Abdus Sattar

3rd Chief of Army Staff
- In office 24 August 1975 – 4 November 1975
- President: Khondaker Mostaq Ahmad
- Prime Minister: None
- Preceded by: K. M. Shafiullah
- Succeeded by: Khaled Mosharraf
- In office 7 November 1975 – 28 April 1978
- President: Abu Sadat Mohammad Sayem; Himself
- Prime Minister: None
- Preceded by: Khaled Mosharraf
- Succeeded by: Hussain Muhammad Ershad

Personal details
- Born: 19 January 1936 Bagbari, Bengal Presidency, British India
- Died: 30 May 1981 (aged 45) Chittagong, Bangladesh
- Cause of death: Assassination
- Resting place: Mausoleum of Ziaur Rahman
- Party: Bangladesh Nationalist Party
- Spouse: Khaleda Khanam Majumder (m. 1960)
- Children: Tarique; Arafat
- Relatives: See Majumder–Zia family
- Education: Pakistan Military Academy; Command and Staff College
- Civilian awards: Independence Award; Order of the Nile; Order of the Yugoslav Star; Hero of the Republic; SAARC Award
- Nickname: Zia

Military service
- Allegiance: Pakistan; (1955–1971); Bangladesh; (1971–1978)
- Branch/service: Pakistan Army; Mukti Bahini; Bangladesh Army
- Years of service: 1955–1978
- Rank: Lieutenant General: Service number: BA-69
- Unit: Punjab Regiment; East Bengal Regiment
- Commands: Commander of Sector – I; Commander of Sector – XI; Commander of Z Force; Commander of 44th Independent Infantry Brigade; Military Secretary at Army Headquarters; Deputy Chief of Army Staff; Chief of Army Staff
- Battles/wars: Indo-Pakistani War of 1965; Bangladesh War of Independence; Sipahi–Janata Revolution; 1976 Bogra mutiny; 1977 Bogra mutiny; 1977 Bangladesh Air Force mutiny; Chittagong Hill Tracts Conflict
- Military awards: Bir Uttom

Ziaur Rahman (Note: Bengali: জিয়াউর রহমান, romanised: Jiẏāur Rôhômān; Bengali pronunciation: [dʒijau̯r ˈɾɔɦoman]) (19 January 1936 – 30 May 1981) was a Bangladeshi military leader and politician who served as the sixth president of Bangladesh from 1977 until his assassination in 1981. One of the leading figures of the country's independence war, Zia broadcast the Bangladeshi declaration of independence in March 1971 from Chittagong. (Note: Multiple references:) In the aftermath of the Sipahi-Janata revolution in 1975, he consolidated power to lead Bangladesh with pragmatic policies through economic liberalisation and civic nationalism that significantly contributed to the economic recovery of the country. He is often referred to as the Shaheed President (lit. 'Martyr President') in Bangladesh. (Note: Multiple references :) He also founded the Bangladesh Nationalist Party (BNP).

Ziaur, sometimes known as Zia, was born in Gabtali and trained at the Pakistan Military Academy in Abbottabad. He served as a company commander in the Pakistan Army in the Second Kashmir War against the Indian Army. Ziaur was a prominent Bangladesh Forces commander during the country's war in 1971. He broadcast the declaration of independence on 27 March from the Swadhin Bangla Betar Kendra radio station in Kalurghat, Chittagong, and was since known as the "Announcer of the Liberation". During the war in 1971, Ziaur was a Bangladesh Forces Commander of BDF Sector 1 initially and BDF Commander of BDF Sector 11 of the Bangladesh Forces from June and the Brigade Commander of Z Force from mid-July. After the war, Ziaur became a brigade commander in the Bangladesh Army and later the Deputy Chief of Staff and then Chief of Staff of the Bangladesh Army. After the removal of Maj. Gen. K. M. Shafiullah following 15 August 1975 military coup, he was elevated to the position of Chief of Staff of the Army. He was removed from the position and house arrested following the 3 November coup. Following his direction, Lt. Col. (retd.) Abu Taher staged the 7 November coup (the Sipahi–Janata Revolution), after which, Ziaur Rahman gained the de facto power as head of the government under martial law imposed by the Justice Sayem government. He took over the presidency in 1977, and retired from the army in 1978 with the rank of Lt. General.

As president in 1978, Ziaur Rahman founded the Bangladesh Nationalist Party. He reinstated multi-party politics, freedom of the press, free speech, free markets, and accountability. He initiated mass irrigation and food production programmes, including social programmes to uplift the lives of the people. His government initiated efforts to create a regional group in South Asia, which later became SAARC in 1985. He improved Bangladesh's relations with the West and China and departed from Sheikh Mujib's close alignment with India. Domestically, Ziaur faced as many as 21 coup attempts for which military tribunals were set up, resulting in at least 200 soldiers of the army and air force being executed, earning him a reputation of being "strict" and "ruthless" amongst international observers. He was assassinated in an attempted coup in Chittagong on 30 May 1981.

Ziaur Rahman left a divided opinion on his legacy in Bangladeshi politics. He is credited with ending the disorder of the final years of Sheikh Mujib's rule and establishing democracy by abolishing BAKSAL, one-party rule established by Mujib. On the other hand, Ziaur Rahman is assailed by his critics for suppressing opposition. However, Zia's economic reforms are credited with rebuilding the economy, and his move towards Islamisation brought him the support of ordinary Bangladeshi people. His political party, the BNP, remains a major force in Bangladeshi politics, with his son Tarique Rahman, leading the party and currently serving as prime minister. Ziaur Rahman's widow, Khaleda Zia, previously led the BNP and served three terms as prime minister.

== Early life ==
Ziaur Rahman was born on 19 January 1936 to a Bengali Muslim family of Mandals in the village of Bagbari in Gabtali, Bogura District. His father, Mansur Rahman, was a chemist and graduated from University of Calcutta with a degree in Chemistry. He was specialised in paper and ink chemistry and worked for a government department at Writers' Building in Kolkata. His grandfather, Moulvi Kamaluddin Mandal, migrated from Mahishaban to Nashipur-Bagbari after marrying his grandmother, Meherunnisa. His mother's name was Jahanara Khatun. Ziaur Rahman was raised in his home village of Bagbari and studied in Bogura Zilla School. He had two younger brothers, Ahmed Kamal (d. 2017) and Khalilur Rahman (d. 2014).

In 1946, Mansur Rahman enrolled Ziaur Rahman for a short stint in a boys school of Calcutta, Hare School, where he studied until the dissolution of the British Empire in India and the partition of India and Pakistan in 1947. Mansur Rahman exercised his option to become a citizen of a Muslim-majority Pakistan and, in August 1947, moved to Karachi, the first capital of Pakistan located in Sindh, West Pakistan. Zia, at the age of 11, began attending class six at the Academy School in Karachi in 1947. Ziaur Rahman spent his adolescent years in Karachi and, by age 16, completed his secondary education from that school in 1952.

In 1953, Ziaur Rahman was admitted into the D. J. Sindh Government Science College. The same year, he joined the Pakistan Military Academy at Kakul as a cadet.

In August 1960, his marriage was arranged to Khaleda Khanam Putul, the 15-year-old daughter of Iskandar and Taiyaba Majumder from the Feni District (part of then Noakhali District). The girl, later known as Khaleda Zia, went on to serve as the Prime Minister of Bangladesh three times. At the time, Ziaur Rahman was a captain in the Pakistan Army who was posted as an Officer of the Defence Forces. His father, Mansur Rahman, could not attend the marriage ceremony, as he was in Karachi. Zia's mother had died earlier.

== Military service in Pakistan ==
Graduating from the Pakistan Military Academy at the 12th PMA long course on 18 September 1955 in the top 10% of his class, Ziaur Rahman was commissioned as a second lieutenant in the Pakistan Army. In the army, he received commando training, became a paratrooper and received training in a special intelligence course.

Ziaur Rahman went to East Pakistan on a short visit and was struck by the negative attitude of the Bengali middle class towards the military, which consumed a large chunk of the country's resources. The low representation of the Bengalis in the military was largely due to discrimination, but Ziaur Rahman felt that the Bengali attitude towards the military perhaps prevented promising young Bengalis from seeking military careers. As a Bengali army officer, he advocated military careers for Bengali youth. Initially he served in the Punjab Regiment for two years before being transferred to the East Bengal Regiment in 1957. He attended military training schools of the British Army. He also worked in the military intelligence department from 1959 to 1964.

Ayub Khan's military rule from 1958 to 1968 convinced Ziaur Rahman of the need for a fundamental change in the Bengali attitude towards the military. During the Indo-Pakistani War of 1965, Ziaur Rahman saw combat in the Khemkaran sector in Punjab as the commander of a company (military unit) of 100–150 soldiers. The first Battalion of the East Bengal Regiment (EBR), under which he fought, won three Sitara-e-Jurat (Star of Courage) medals and eight Tamgha-i-Jurat (Medal of Courage) medals, for their role in the 1965 War with India. In 1966, Ziaur Rahman was appointed military instructor at the Pakistan Military Academy, later going on to attend the Command and Staff College in Quetta, Pakistan; he completed a course in command and tactical warfare. Ziaur Rahman helped raise two Bengali battalions called the 8th and 9th Bengals during his stint as instructor. Around the same time, his wife Khaleda Zia, now 24, gave birth to their first child, Tarique Rahman, on 20 November 1966. Ziaur Rahman joined the 2nd East Bengal regiment as its second-in-command at Joydebpur in Gazipur district, near Dhaka, in February 1969, and travelled to West Germany to receive advanced military and command training from the British Army of the Rhine and later spent a few months with the British Army.

=== Pre-Independence ===
Ziaur Rahman returned to Pakistan the same year. He was posted in Chittagong, East Pakistan, in June 1969, to be second-in-command of the 8th East Bengal Regiment. East Pakistan had been devastated by the 1970 Bhola cyclone, and the population had been embittered by the slow response of the central government and the political conflict between Pakistan's two major parties, Sheikh Mujibur Rahman's Awami League and Zulfikar Ali Bhutto's Pakistan People's Party (PPP). In the 1970 Pakistani general election, the Awami League had won a majority, and its leader, Sheikh Mujib, laid claim to form a government, but Pakistan's president Yahya Khan postponed the convening of the legislature under pressure from Zulfikar Ali Bhutto's PPP party.

== Bangladesh Liberation War ==
Following the failure of last-ditch talks, Yahya Khan declared martial law and ordered the army to crack down on Bengali political activities. Sheikh Mujibur Rahman was arrested before midnight on 26 March 1971, taken to Tejgaon Airport and flown to West Pakistan. He was a Bangladesh Forces Commander of BDF Sector 1 initially and, from June, BDF Commander of BDF Sector 11 of the Bangladesh Forces and the Brigade Commander of Z Force from mid-July.

Zia, who by then was already geared to revolt against the government of Pakistan, revolted and later arrested and executed his commanding officer, Lt. Col. Abdul Rashid Janjua. He was requested by the local Awami League supporters and leaders to announce the Declaration of Independence that was earlier (in the early hours of 26 March 1971) proclaimed by the undisputed Bengali leader Bangabandhu Sheikh Mujibur Rahman before his (Ziaur Rahman) arrest on 27 March 1971 from Kalurghat, Chittagong, as an Army officer's words would carry weight restoring people's trust in the 'Declaration of Independence', which read: (Note: Multiple references:)

This is Swadhin Bangla Betar Kendra. I, Major Ziaur Rahman, on behalf of Bangabandhu Sheikh Mujibur Rahman, hereby declare that the independent People's Republic of Bangladesh has been established. I call upon all Bengalis to rise against the attack by the West Pakistani Army. We shall fight to the last to free our motherland. By the grace of Allah, victory is ours.

Later on the same day (27 March), a second broadcast was read as the declaration of independence of Bangladesh:

I, Major Ziaur Rahman, do hereby declare the Independence of Bangladesh.

Later in an interview with German Radio, Ziaur Rahman talked about his 27 March announcement.

Ziaur Rahman organised an infantry unit gathering all Bengali soldiers from military and EPR units in Chittagong. He designated it Sector No. 1 with its HQ in Sabroom. A few weeks later, he was transferred to Teldhala, where he organised and created Sector 11. All sectors were restructured officially under Bangladesh Forces, such as the sector in the Chittagong and Hill Tracts area, under Colonel M. A. G. Osmani, the Supreme Commander of Bangladesh Forces, of the Provisional Government of Bangladesh, which had its headquarters on Theatre Road, Calcutta, in India. On 30 July 1971, Ziaur Rahman was appointed the commander of the first conventional brigade of the Bangladesh Forces, which was named "Z Force", after the first initial of his name. His brigade consisted of the 1st, 3rd and 8th East Bengali regiments, enabling Ziaur Rahman to launch major attacks on Pakistani forces. With the Z Force, Ziaur Rahman "acquired a reputation for icy bravery", according to The New York Times, and was awarded the Bir Uttom, the second-highest military honour (and the highest for living officers) by the government of Bangladesh.

== Rise to power ==
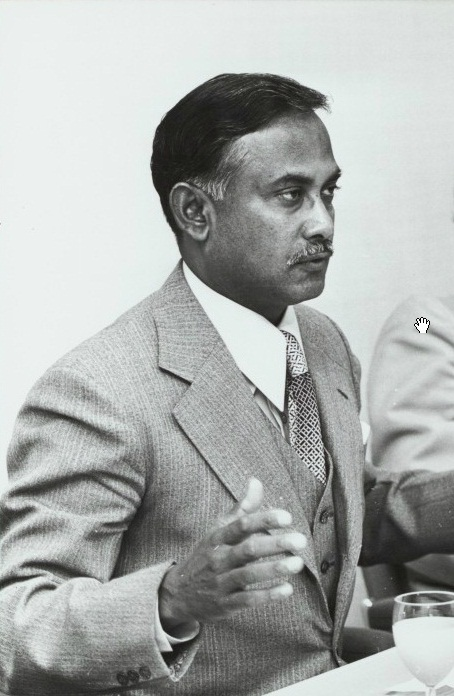
Ziaur Rahman delivering a speech at a public conference before 1979

A deep conspiracy to remove Sheikh Mujibur Rahman from the helm was well underway long before his assassination by outside forces and internal collaborators within Bangladesh. On 15 August 1975, President Sheikh Mujibur Rahman and his family were assassinated in a gunfight with army personnel. One of Mujibur Rahman's cabinet ministers and a leading conspirator, Khondaker Mostaq Ahmad, gained the presidency and dismissed Major General K M Shafiullah, who had stayed neutral during the coup. Major General Ziaur Rahman (then Deputy Chief of Army Staff) was appointed Chief of Army Staff after Shafiullah resigned. However, the coup of 15 August caused a period of instability and unrest in Bangladesh and amongst the rank and file of the armed forces. Brigadier Khaled Mosharraf and the 46th Brigade of Dhaka Cantonment under Colonel Shafaat Jamil revolted against Khandaker Mushtaq Ahmed's administration on 3 November 1975, and Ziaur Rahman was forced to relinquish his post and put under house arrest. This was followed on 7 November by the Sipahi–Janata Revolution (Soldier–People's Revolution), a mutiny staged by the Jatiyo Samajtantrik Dal (JSD or National Socialist Party) under retired Lieutenant Colonel Abu Taher and a group of socialist military officers. Khaled Mosharraf was killed by his subordinate officers while he was sheltering with them from the mutineers. Shafaat Jamil escaped but was injured, while Ziaur Rahman was freed by the 2nd Artillery Regiment under Lt. Col. Rashid and reappointed Chief of Army Staff with full support of the rank and file of the army.

Following a meeting at army headquarters, an interim government was formed with Justice Abu Sadat Mohammad Sayem as chief martial law administrator and Ziaur Rahman, Air Vice Marshal M. G. Tawab and Rear Admiral M. H. Khan as his deputies. However, discipline in the army had totally collapsed, and it was difficult to disarm the soldiers supported by JSD and Lt. Col. Taher, as they plotted another coup to remove Ziaur Rahman. Ziaur Rahman realised that the disorder had to be suppressed firmly if discipline was to be restored in the Bangladesh Army. Ziaur Rahman cracked down on the JSD and Gonobahini. Abu Taher was sentenced to death in July 1976, and other party figures received various terms of imprisonment. Taher was executed on 21 July 1976. Ziaur Rahman became the chief martial law administrator the same year. He tried to integrate the armed forces, giving repatriates a status appropriate to their qualifications and seniority. While this angered some veterans of the independence war, who had rapidly reached high positions following independence in 1971, Ziaur Rahman sent discontented officers on diplomatic missions abroad to defuse unrest.

== Presidency ==
A documentary on the life of Ziaur Rahman directed by filmmaker Chashi Nazrul Islam.

Ziaur Rahman became the president of Bangladesh on 21 April 1977. Years of disorder from the previous political administration of the Awami League and BAKSAL had left most of Bangladesh's state institutions in disarray, with constant internal and external threats. After becoming president in 1977, Ziaur Rahman lifted martial law and introduced massive reforms for the development of the country.

In late September 1977, a failed coup against his administration occurred. A group of Japanese Red Army terrorists hijacked Japan Airlines Flight 472 from India, armed with weapons and ammunition, and forced it to land at Tejgaon International Airport. On 30 September, while the attention of the government was riveted on this crisis, due to the spreading of panic and disinformation, actions went underway in Bogra Cantonment, where a revolt broke out. Although the revolt was quickly quelled on the night of 2 October, another revolt started in Dhaka cantonment, led by misinformed airmen of the Bangladesh Air Force (BAF). Armed units from these army and air force personnel unsuccessfully attacked Zia's residence, captured Dhaka Radio for a short time and killed eleven air force officers and 30 airmen at Tejgaon International Airport, where they were gathered for negotiations with the hijackers. Wing Commander M. Hamidullah Khan TJ, SH, BP (BDF Commander Bangladesh Forces Sector 11), then BAF Ground Defence Commander, quickly put down the rebellion within the Air Force, while the then government was severely shaken. Chief of Air Staff AVM AG Mahmud reappointed Wing Commander Hamidullah Khan as Provost Marshal of BAF. President Zia immediately appointed Wing Commander Hamidullah Khan as ZMLA (Dhaka) and Director of Martial Law Communications and Control at Tejgaon (present-day PM's Office). Government intelligence had failed, and President Ziaur Rahman promptly dismissed the DG-NSI and the DFI chief, AVM Aminul Islam Khan, of 9th GD (P), formerly a coursemate of AVM A. K. Khandkar of the Pakistan Air Force. Under Zia's presidential directive, Hamidullah initiated the transfer of DFI at Old Bailey Road from the Ministry of Defence to Dhaka Cantonment under direct control of the president and reorganised it as DGFI. In the aftermath, at least 200 soldiers involved in the coup attempt were executed following a military trial.

The size of Bangladesh police forces was doubled, and the number of soldiers in the army increased from 50,000 to 90,000. In 1978, he appointed Hussain Muhammad Ershad as the new Chief of Army Staff, promoting him to the rank of lieutenant general. He was viewed as a professional soldier with no political aspirations because of his imprisonment in former West Pakistan during the Bangladesh War of Independence. Quietly, Ershad rose to become Zia's close political and military counsellor.

=== Elections ===
In 1978, General Ziaur Rahman ran for and overwhelmingly won a five-year term as president. The next year, elections were held for the National Assembly. Opponents questioned the integrity of the elections.

Zia allowed Sheikh Hasina, the exiled daughter of Sheikh Mujibur Rahman, to return to Bangladesh in 1981.

=== Domestic and foreign policies ===
On taking power, Ziaur Rahman was "hailed as the strict leader that the struggling nation needed." Bangladesh suffered from illiteracy, severe poverty, chronic unemployment, shortages and economic stagnation. Ziaur Rahman reversed course from his predecessor Mujib's secular, democratic socialist, pro-Indian policies. Ziaur Rahman announced a "19-point programme" of economic emancipation which emphasised self-reliance, rural development, decentralisation, free markets and population control. Ziaur Rahman spent much of his time travelling throughout the country, preaching the "politics of hope" and urging Bangladeshis to work harder and to produce more. He held cabinet meetings all across Bangladesh. Ziaur Rahman focused on boosting agricultural and industrial production, especially in food and grains, and to integrate rural development through a variety of programmes, of which population planning was the most important. He introduced and opened the Bangladesh Jute and Rice Research Institutes. He launched an ambitious rural development programme in 1977, which included a highly visible and popular food-for-work programme. He promoted private sector development, export growth, and the reversing of the collectivisation of farms. His government reduced quotas and restrictions on agriculture and industrial activities. Ziaur Rahman launched major projects to construct irrigation canals, power stations, dams, roads and other public works. Directing his campaign to mobilise rural support and development, Ziaur Rahman established the Gram Sarkar (Village Councils) system of self-government and the "Village Defence Party" system of security and crime prevention. Programmes to promote primary and adult education on a mass scale were initiated and focused mainly across rural Bangladesh. During this period, Bangladesh's economy achieved fast economic and industrial growth.

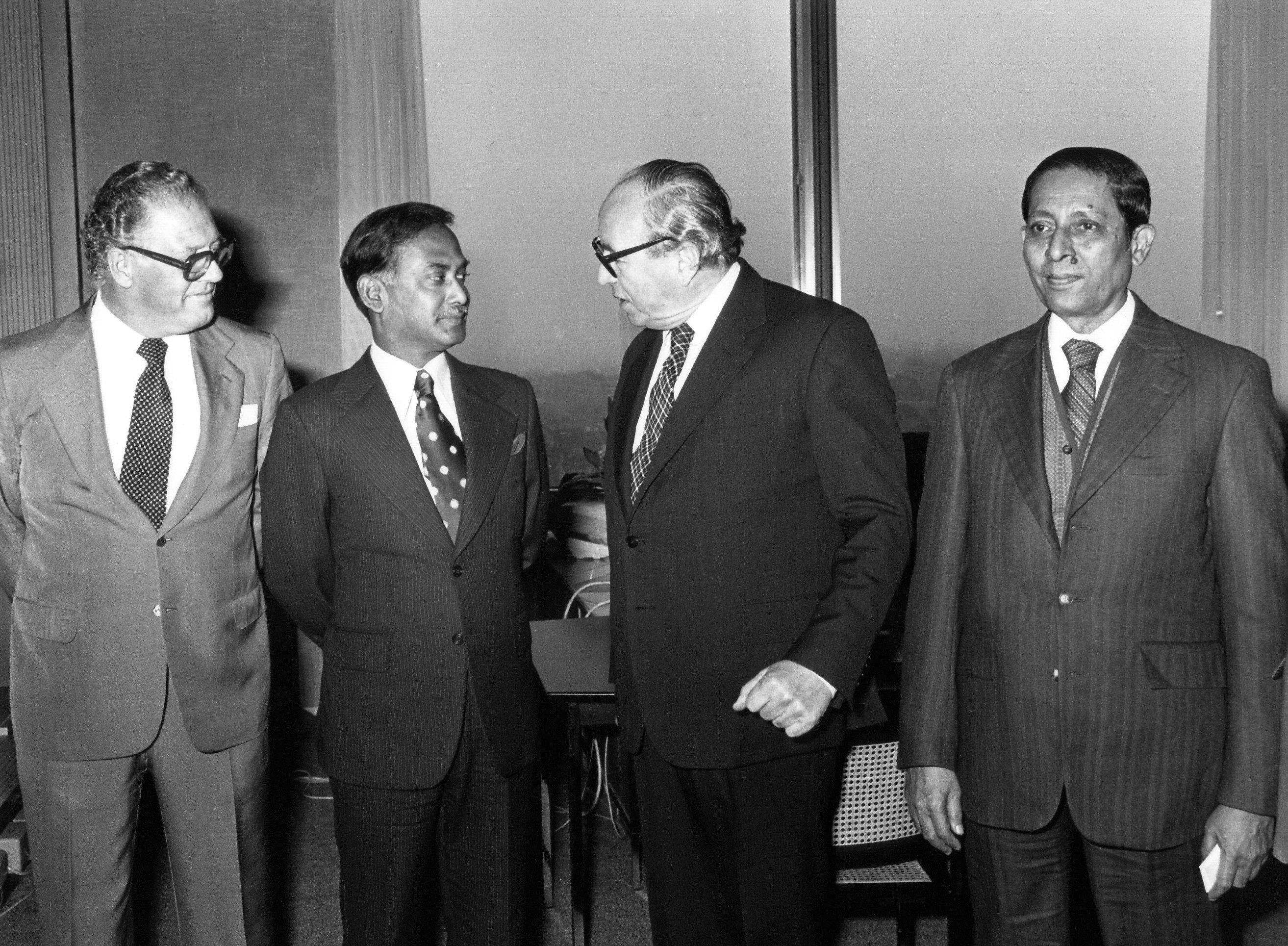
Discussion between Ziaur Rahman and Roy Jenkins, in the presence of Muhammad Shamsul Haque and Wilhelm Haferkamp

Ziaur Rahman began reorienting Bangladesh's foreign policy, addressing the concerns of the mostly staunch rightists, coupled with some renegade leftists who believed that Bangladesh was reliant on Indian economic and military aid. Ziaur Rahman moved away from India and the Soviet bloc his predecessors had worked with, developing closer relations with the United States and Western Europe, Africa and the Middle East. Ziaur Rahman also moved to harmonise ties with Saudi Arabia and the People's Republic of China, Pakistan's ally who had opposed Bangladesh's creation and had not recognised it until 1975. Rahman moved to normalise relations with Pakistan. While distancing Bangladesh from India, Ziaur Rahman sought to improve ties with other Islamic nations. Zia's move towards Islamic state policies improved the nation's standing in the Middle East. According to historian Tazeen M. Murshid, one aim of these policies was to open the Gulf states to manpower exports. In this, Zia was successful, and remittances became an important part of the Bangladeshi economy.

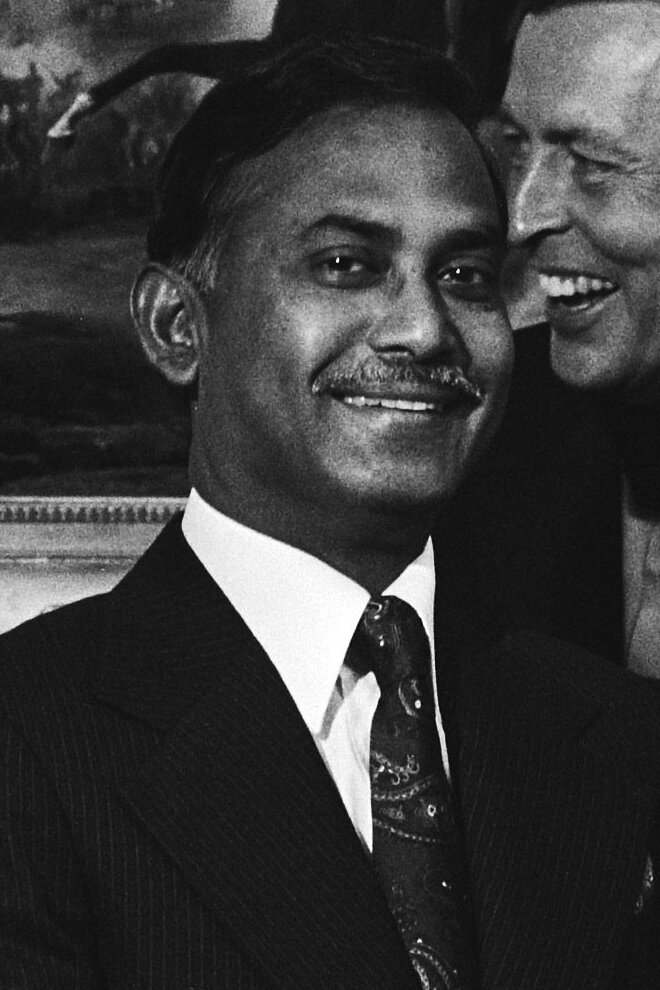
Ziaur Rahman in 1979, during a state visit at Netherlands

Ziaur Rahman would later sought ASEAN membership in an effort to broaden the country's alliances and legitimise his new administration on the international stage. Bangladesh formally applied to join ASEAN, but this request was turned down by the existing Southeast Asian members. The idea to join ASEAN would later be revived by Muhammad Yunus and later by Zia's son, Tarique Rahman. Drawing inspiration from ASEAN's success, Ziaur Rahman would also propose an organisation of the nations of South Asia to bolster economic and political cooperation at a regional level. This proposal materialised in 1985 under the presidency of Hussain Muhammad Ershad with the first meeting of the South Asia Association for Regional Cooperation in Dhaka. Zia's vision has earned him a posthumous award from the organisation.

=== Islam and nationalism ===
Ziaur Rahman believed that a massive section of the population was suffering from an identity crisis, both religiously and as a people, with a very limited sense of sovereignty. To remedy this, he began a process of mixing ideologies from moderate Islam, pluralism, inclusivity, a new nationalistic ideology, and some from secularism. He issued a proclamation order amending the constitution, under whose basis laws would be set in an effort to increase the self-knowledge of religion and nation. In the preamble, he inserted the salutation "Bismillahir-Rahmaanir-Rahim" ("In the name of Allah, the Beneficent, the Merciful"). In Articles 8(1) and 8(1A), the statement "absolute trust and faith in Almighty Allah" was added, replacing the socialist commitment to secularism. Socialism was redefined as "economic and social justice" under his leadership. In Article 25(2), Ziaur Rahman introduced the principle that "the state shall endeavour to consolidate, preserve and strengthen fraternal relations among Muslim countries based on Islamic solidarity." Some intellectuals accuse Ziaur Rahman of changing the nature of the republic from the secularism laid out by Sheikh Mujib and his supporters. However, critics of this accusation say the rationale is absurd and an oversimplification since secular leaders like Gamal Abdel Nasser and Ahmed Ben Bella adopted this policy, and that religious slogans and symbolism are also used by the Awami League. Ziaur Rahman believed that Islam, as a religion, could play some role in guiding the Muslim-majority Bangladesh.

Later, Ziaur Rahman introduced Islamic religious education as a compulsory subject for Muslim schoolchildren. At the birth of Bangladesh, many Islamists had supported the Pakistani Army's fight against independence and been barred from politics with the Bangladesh Collaborators (Special Tribunals) Order of 1972. Ziaur Rahman undid this as well as the ban on communal parties and associations due to his commitment to multiparty democracy and political pluralism.

In public speeches and policies that he formulated, Ziaur Rahman began expounding "Bangladesh Nationalism", its "Sovereignty", as opposed to Mujib's assertion of a Bengali identity based on language-based nationalism. Claiming to promote an inclusive national identity, Ziaur Rahman reached out to non-Bengali minorities such as the Santals, Garos, Manipuris and Chakmas, as well as the Urdu-speaking peoples of Bihari origin. He even amended the constitution to change the nationality of the citizens from Bengali, an ethnic identity, to Bangladeshi, a national identity, under sovereign allegiance, not political belief or party affiliation.

After the formation of the Bangladesh Nationalist Party in 1978, Ziaur Rahman took the initiative for the formation of political institutes and sponsored workshops for the youth to get active political lessons on Bangladeshi nationalism. In such a workshop in September 1980, Ziaur Rahman spoke to the learners.

=== Indemnity Act ===
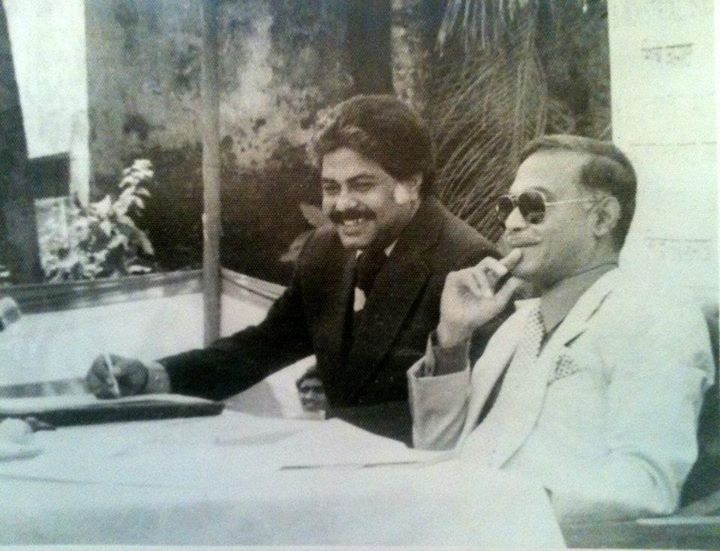
A. K. A. Firoze Noon and President Ziaur Rahman (1979)

Ziaur Rahman enacted several controversial measures, some to discipline the army, some to solidify his power, and some to win the support of Islamist political groups such as the Jamaat-e-Islami. Zia also facilitated the comeback of the Muslim League and other Islamic parties, appointing the highly controversial anti-independence figure Shah Azizur Rahman (who was earlier released from jail by Sheikh Mujibur Rahman in 1973) as prime minister.

Ziaur Rahman gave foreign appointments to several men accused of assassinating Sheikh Mujibur Rahman. Major Dalim, Major Rashid, and Major Faruk were given jobs in the Ministry of Foreign Affairs, and in subsequent years, they were appointed ambassadors of Bangladesh to African and Middle Eastern nations.

The Indemnity Ordinance (which gave immunity from legal action to the persons involved in the assassination of President Sheikh Mujibur Rahman, coups and other political events between 1975 and 1979) was proclaimed by President Khondaker Mostaq Ahmad in 1975, ratified in the Parliament as the Indemnity Act, and incorporated as the 5th amendment to the constitution during the tenure of President Hussain Muhammad Ershad.

== Assassination ==
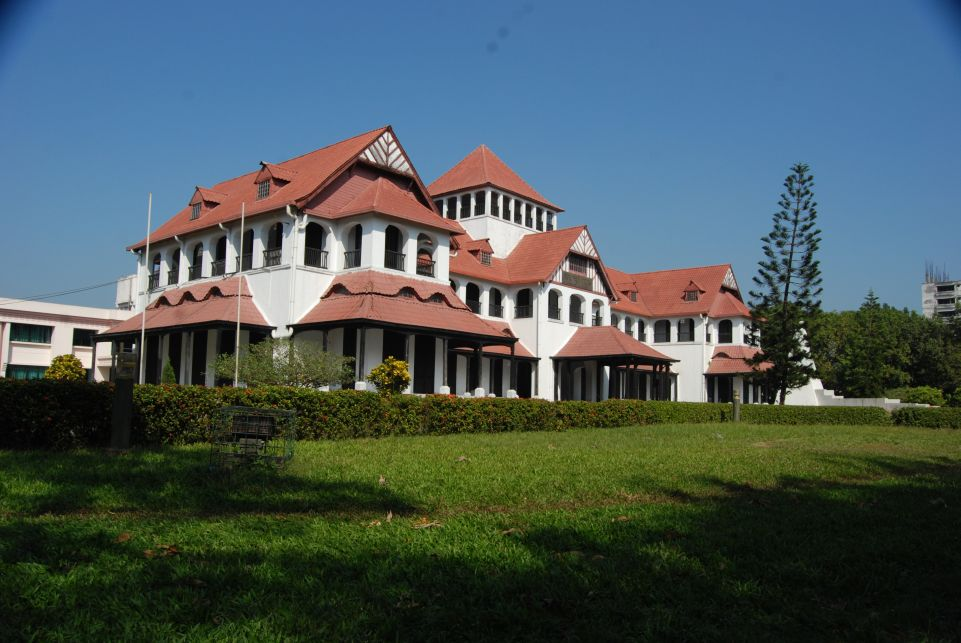
Chittagong Circuit House

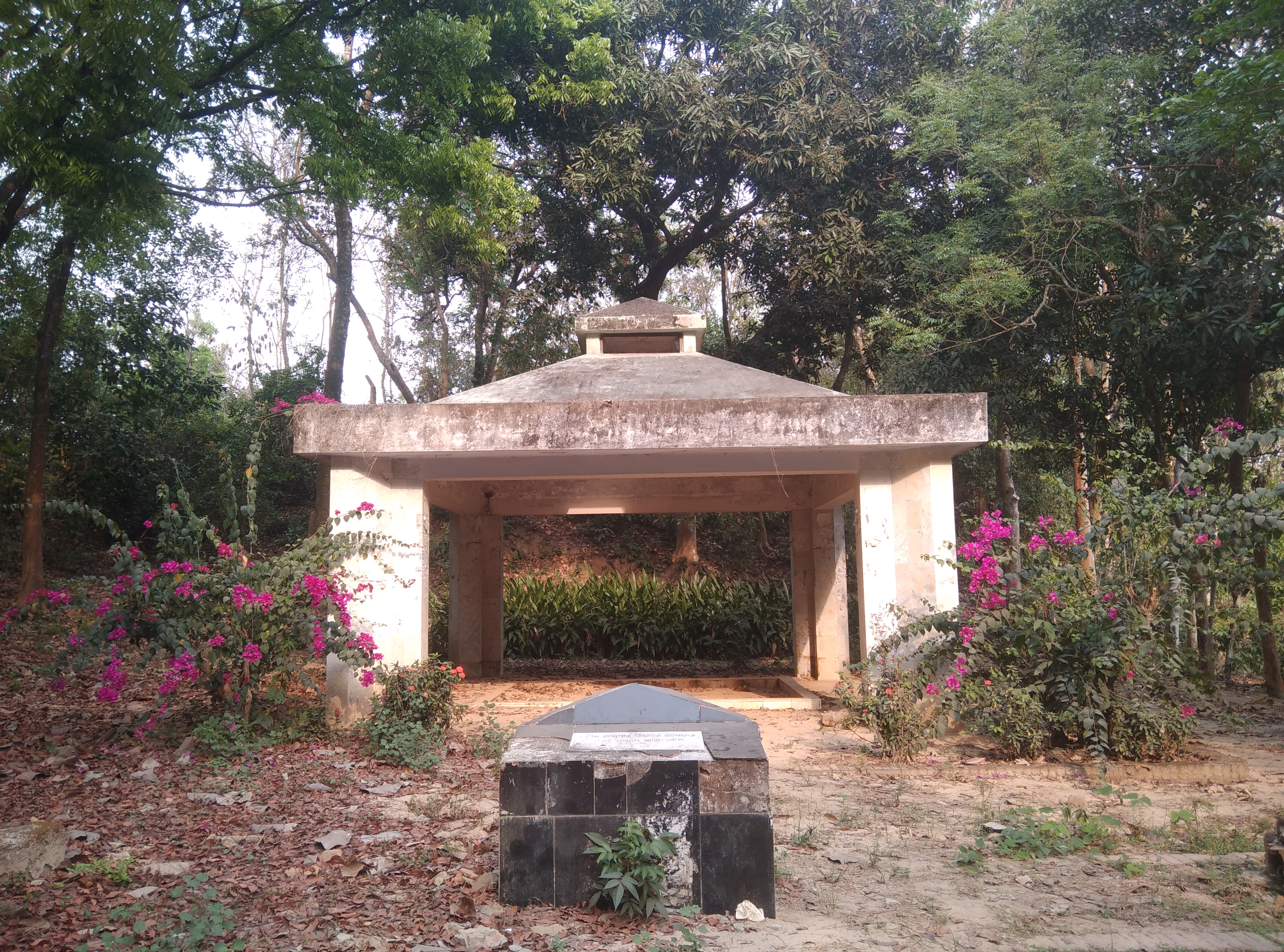
The first burial site of Zia in Rangunia Upazila

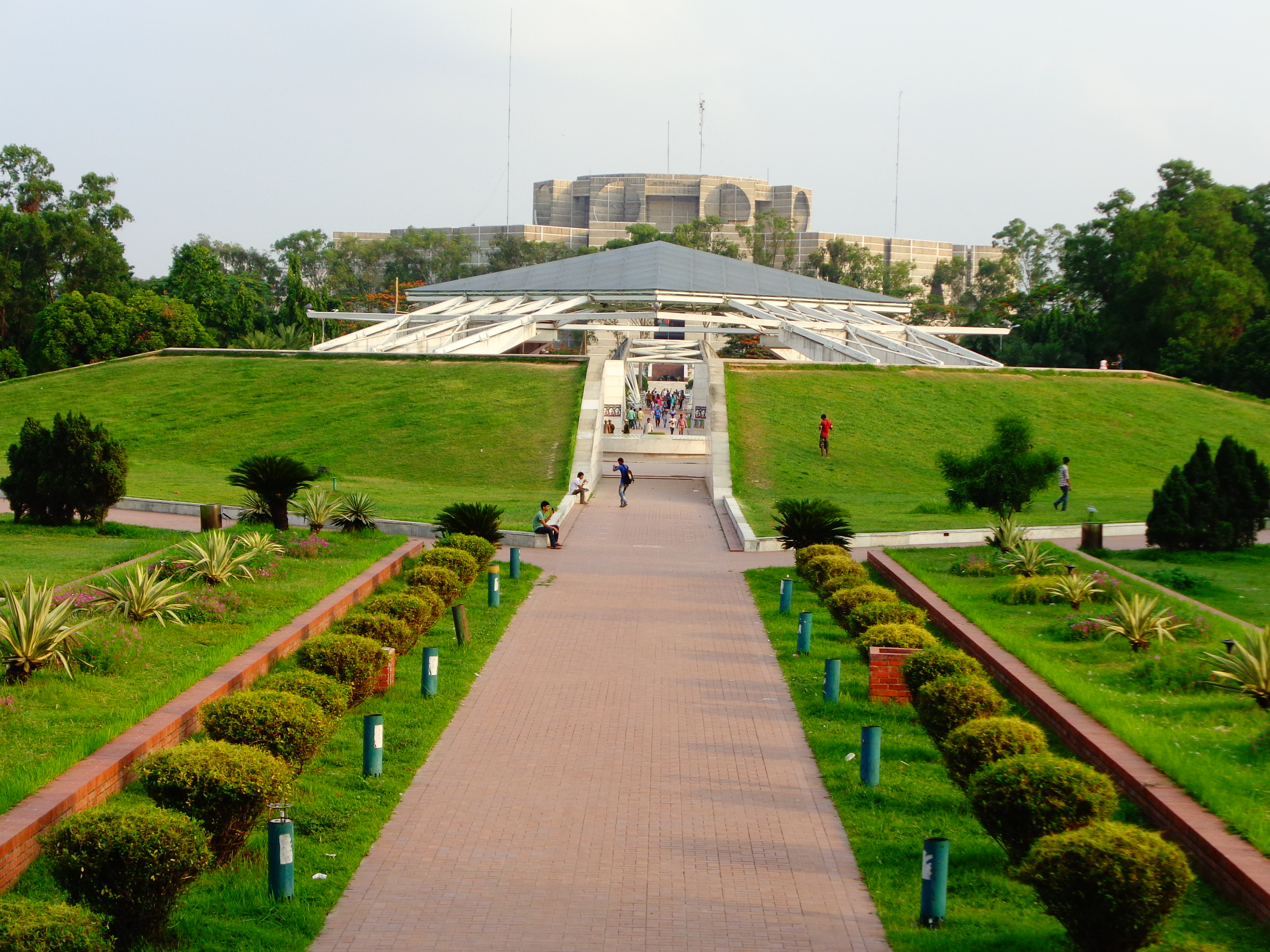
Mausoleum complex in Zia Udyan

During his term of power, Ziaur Rahman was criticised for ruthless treatment of his army opposition. Although he enjoyed overall popularity and public confidence, Zia's rehabilitation of some of the most controversial men in Bangladesh aroused fierce opposition from the supporters of the Awami League and veterans of its Mukti Bahini. Amidst speculation and fears of unrest, Ziaur Rahman went on tour to Chittagong on 29 May 1981 to help resolve an intra-party political dispute in the regional BNP. Ziaur Rahman and his entourage stayed overnight at the Chittagong Circuit House. In the early hours of the morning of 30 May, he was assassinated by a group of army officers. Also killed were six of his bodyguards and two aides.

Nearly two million people are estimated to have attended the funeral held at the Parliament of Bangladesh.

== Controversies ==
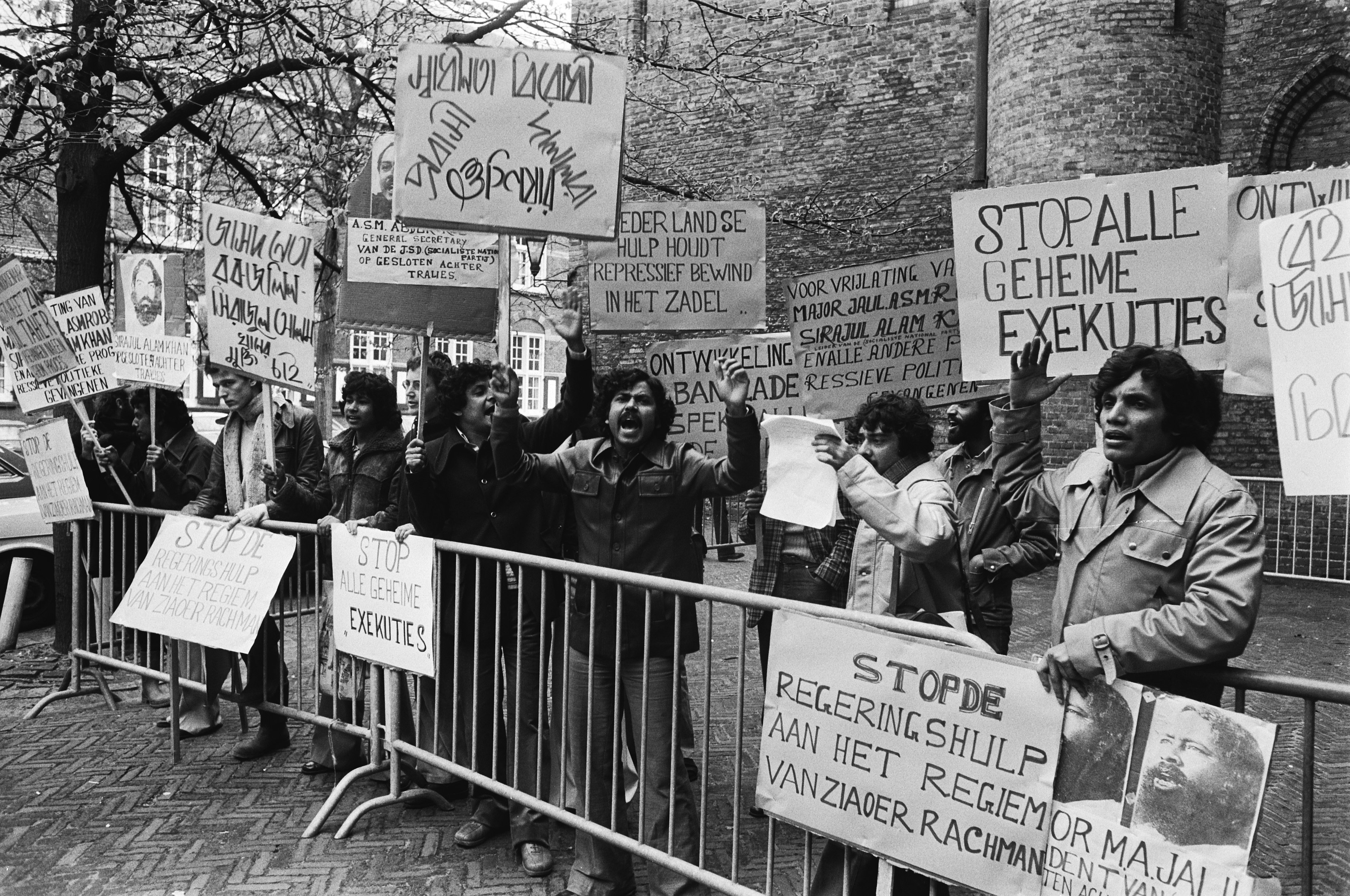
Demonstration in The Hague, Holland, in 1979, demanding cessation of cooperation with Ziaur Rahman's government.

=== Political debate ===
Zia's role after the 15 August 1975 assassination of Sheikh Mujibur Rahman and his family remains controversial. The Indemnity Act, an ordinance ordered by Khondaker Mostaq Ahmad in 1975 pardoning the subsequently convicted killers of Sheikh Mujibur Rahman, was not abolished by Rahman during his tenure as president. Some killers of Sheikh Mujibur Rahman and his family were sent abroad during his time as president.

=== Ascension to presidency ===
The Dhaka High Court declared the seizures of power by military coups between 1975 and 1979, including Zia's military regime, as "unlawful and unconstitutional". Zia's martial law decrees, his ascendancy to the presidency in 1977 and the election held in 1978 were declared "unknown to the constitution". The court ruling overruled the Indemnity Act by which these very events were accorded a legal status and enshrined in the constitution.

=== Reintroducing multi-party democracy ===
Ziaur Rahman opposed Sheikh Mujib's one-party state policy and reintroduced multi-party democracy. Not only this, he also paved the way for Awami League to re-enter into politics, as Awami League was out of politics after Mujibur Rahman's assassination, Awami League was dissolved to form BAKSAL (one-party state policy) and the 1975 August Revolution (where Sheikh Mujib was killed by a group of army officers), through Sheikh Hasina, daughter of Sheikh Mujib, returned to Bangladesh and got a chance to re-establish Awami League as a political power. He also brought Bangladesh into the Organisation of Islamic Cooperation, a move that was widely welcomed by the general public. However, many historians argue that these actions might have alienated Bangladesh's tribal and religious minorities.

=== Suppression of opposition ===
During Ziaur Rahman's government era, at least 20 military coup attempts took place. It is claimed that many soldiers and military officials either disappeared or were killed during Zia's government. On one occasion, about 1,143 people were hanged in various Bangladeshi prisons on charges of participating in a failed coup attempt on 2 October 1977.

== Personal life and interests ==
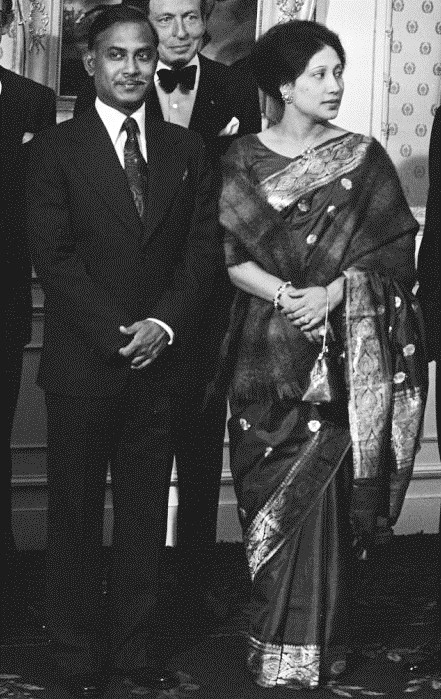
Zia with his spouse, Khaleda Zia, in an official visit to the Netherlands in 1979

With Khaleda Zia, Ziaur Rahman had two sons, Tarique Rahman and Arafat Rahman (d. 2015). Khaleda became the head of the BNP and organised a coalition of political parties opposed to Ershad's regime. In elections held in 1991, she led the BNP to victory and became the first female prime minister of Bangladesh. She lost the 1996 elections to the Awami League's Sheikh Hasina but returned to power in 2001. Tarique has served as the country's prime minister since 2026.

According to singer Baby Naznin, "Prothom Bangladesh" was the favourite song of Rahman. It was performed at the beginning and end of his events. When Baby and other artists used to sing it on stage, Rahman and his wife Khaleda Zia would also sing along sometimes.

== Legacy ==
Ziaur Rahman's legacy remains complex among the Bangladeshis. Awami League supporters vilify him for alleged connections to Sheikh Mujib's assassination and controversial actions during his presidency. (Note: Multiple references:) Critics argue that Sheikh Hasina's authoritarian regime politically motivated the negative portrayal of Ziaur's legacy. (Note: Multiple references:) Nevertheless, Zia is generally credited for his role in the Independence War, stabilising Bangladesh, industrialising agriculture, and fostering regional cooperation. (Note: Multiple references:) The BNP continues to hold his legacy. Zia was also honoured by the South Asian Association for Regional Cooperation for his statesmanship and vision.

Many things in Bangladesh are named after him after his death. Turkey posthumously named a road in Ankara as Ziaur Rahman Caddesi in his honour. In 2004, Ziaur Rahman was ranked number 19 in the BBC's poll of the Greatest Bengali of All Time.

=== Honours ===
- Bangladesh:
  - Bir Uttom
  - Independence Award
- Pakistan:
  - Hilal-i-Jur'at
- Egypt:
  - Grand Cordon of Order of the Nile
- North Korea:
  - Hero of the Republic
- Yugoslavia:
  - Order of the Yugoslav Great Star

== Gallery ==
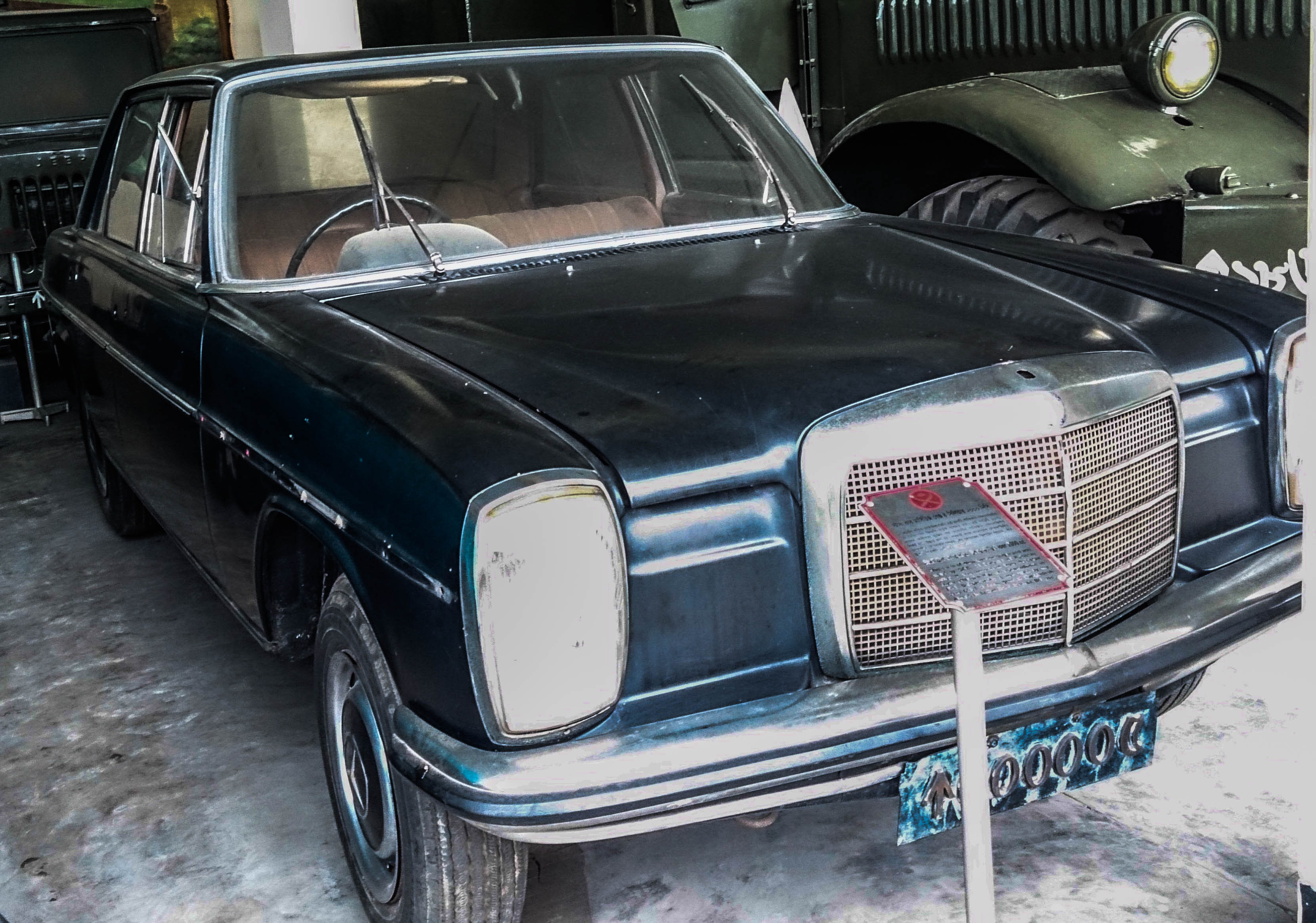
Mercedes Benz car used by Ziaur Rahman when he was Chief of Army Staff

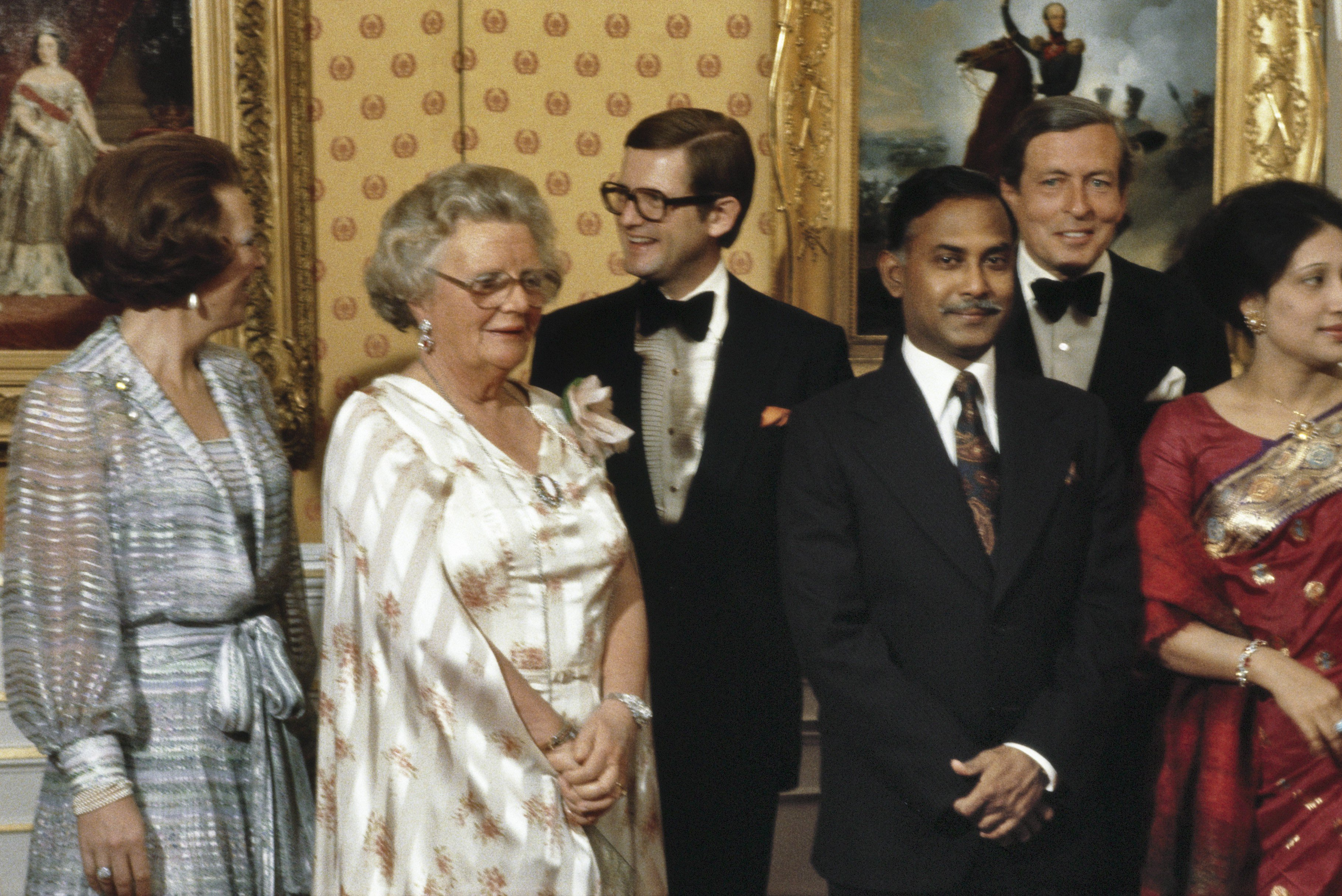
Ziaur Rahman (second right) with members of the Dutch royal family in 1978

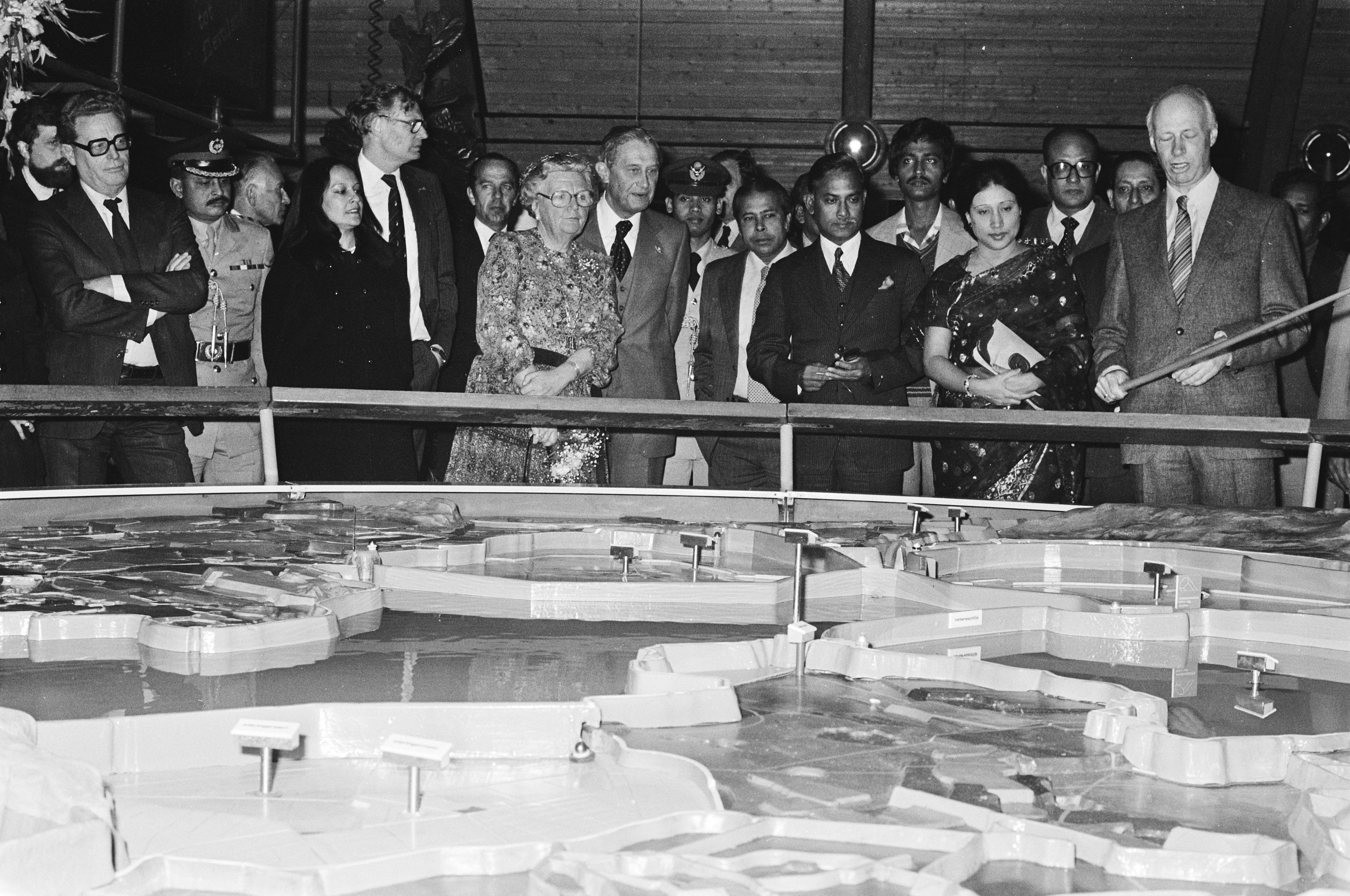
Ziaur Rahman, Khaleda Zia and Queen Juliana at the New Land Information Center in Lelystad

== Bibliography ==
- Khan, Q M Jalal (15 June 2021). President Ziaur Rahman: Legendary Leader of Bangladesh. Writers Republic LLC, 2021. ISBN 9781637285732.
