= Bangladesh: A Legacy of Blood =

1986 book by Anthony Mascarenhas

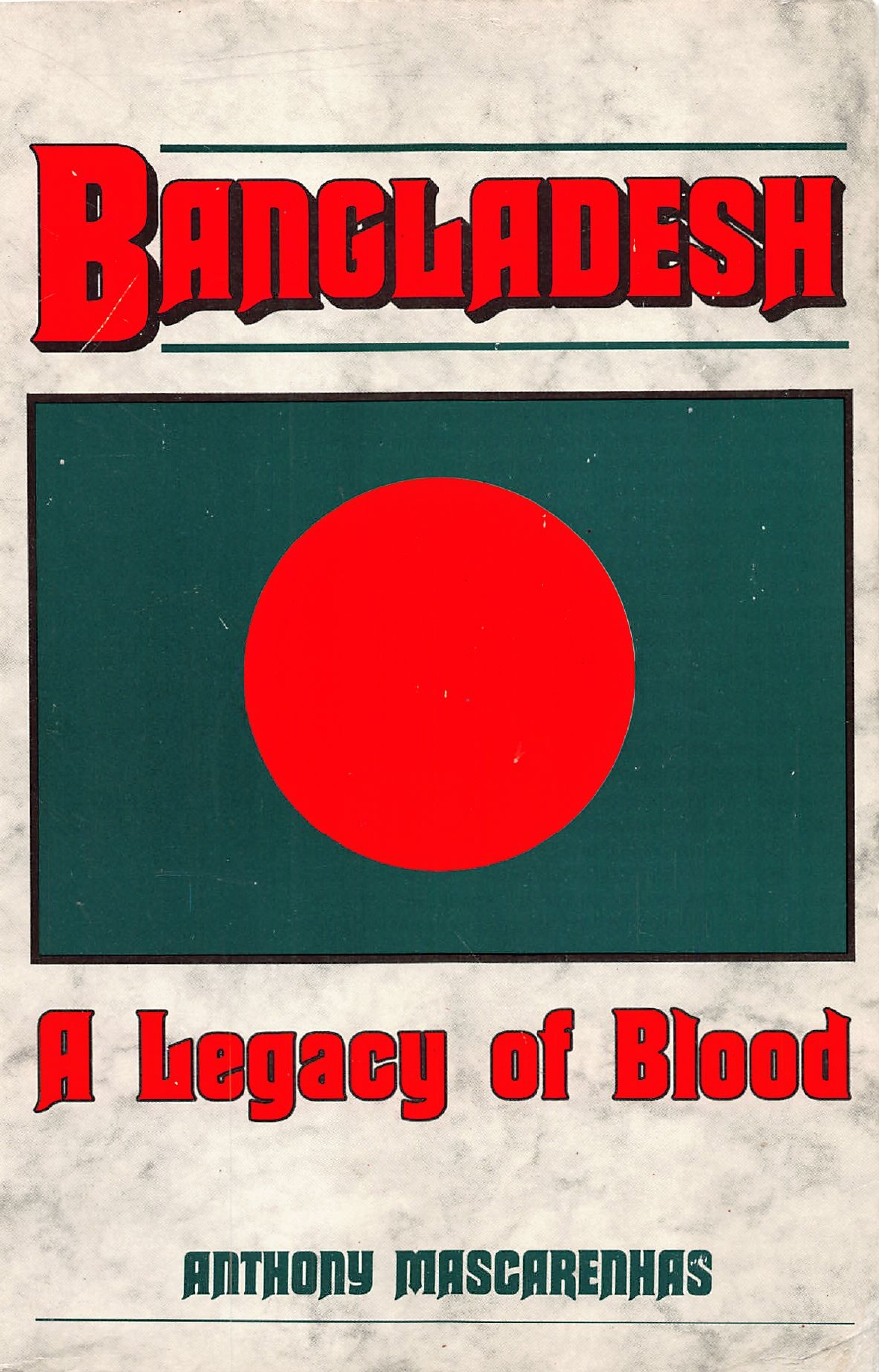
- Cover of the first edition
- Author: Anthony Mascarenhas
- Language: English
- Publisher: Hodder & Stoughton
- Publication date: 1 March 1986
- Publication place: United Kingdom
- Media type: Print (paperback)
- Pages: 117
- ISBN: 978-0340394205

Bangladesh: A Legacy of Blood is a 1986 book by Pakistani journalist Anthony Mascarenhas. It is a non-fictional account of the history of Bangladesh from its independence in 1971. The book chronicles the bloody coups and uprisings in the post-independence Bangladesh. The book focuses on the two towering figures of Bangladeshi politics, Sheikh Mujibur Rahman and Ziaur Rahman.

== Content ==
The book is written in an engaging style, and treats the coups/assassinations and their plotters in great detail. A section of black-and-white photographs depict the slain Sheikh Mujibur Rahman, the slain General Ziaur Rahman, plotters behind various coups, politicians and some photocopies of documents and an official gazette related to the many coups this South Asian country has suffered. In its jacket, the book promises references who killed Sheikh Mujibur Rahman (the first prime minister of Bangladesh); who was responsible for the jail killings in Bangladesh; and how General Zia was assassinated. Written in 13 chapters and an index, the book also contains a list of officers convicted by General Court Martial and hanged for the assassination of President Ziaur Rahman.

In a November 1985 preface to the book, Mascarenhas writes: "This is a true story; in many ways a text book of Third World disenchantment. On the 16th of December, 1971, the state of Bangladesh (population 70,000,000) was born at the end of a nine-month liberation struggle in which more than a million Bengalis of the erstwhile East Pakistan died at the hands of the Pakistan army. But one of the 20th century's great man-made disasters is also among the greatest of its human triumphs in terms of a people's will for self-determination."

== Reception ==
David Taylor, a South Asia expert, praises the book's "attention to detail and narrative" although he suggests that it is short on interpretation and treats certain episodes of lesser importance in "excessive length".
