= Anthony Mascarenhas =

Indian-Pakistani journalist and author

Neville Anthony Mascarenhas (10 July 1928 – 3 December 1986) was an Indian journalist and author. His works include exposés on the brutality of Pakistan's military during the 1971 independence movement of Bangladesh, The Rape of Bangla Desh (1971) and Bangladesh: A Legacy of Blood (1986). In 1971, he wrote the article titled Genocide, published by the Sunday Times, which has been dubbed as an article that "changed history", and recognized as "one of the most influential pieces of South Asian journalism of the past half century".

== Personal life ==
Mascarenhas was born into a Goan Catholic family in Belgaum (then part of the Bombay Presidency), just over 100 kilometres away from Portuguese-ruled Goa, and educated in Karachi. He and his wife Yvonne Mascarenhas together had five children. He died, aged 58, in London in 1986.

== Career ==
Mascarenhas was a journalist who was the assistant editor at The Morning News (Karachi). Later on, he worked for 14 years with the Sunday Times (London). Afterward, he was a freelance writer.

=== Genocide ===
In March 1971, a civil war erupted in East Pakistan (now Bangladesh) between Bengali nationalists and the Pakistani military government. Mascarenhas was a respected Pakistani journalist based in Karachi. When the conflict began, the Pakistani military brought a group of journalists on a 10-day guided tour of East Pakistan to show them how they had successfully quelled the 'freedom fighters.' Mascarenhas was one of eight Pakistani reporters given permission to report from the war zone in East Pakistan. This was likely due to his good reputation and contacts within Pakistan's ruling elite. Foreign journalists had already been banned from the region. The military aimed to use the reporters to publish propaganda that promoted their narrative of events. However, Mascarenhas was horrified by what he witnessed during the tightly controlled tour in 1971. He saw the aftermath of brutal mass killings and heard army officers describe large-scale atrocities. The officers even spoke casually about their 'kill counts' from that day's rampages.

"All but one of the reporters did as they were told" — only Mascarenhas seemed so shaken by his experience that he had a moral crisis. Yvonne Mascarenhas, Anthony's wife, recalled to the BBC in 2011: "I'd never seen my husband looking in such a state. He was absolutely shocked, stressed, upset and terribly emotional. "He told me that if he couldn't write the story of what he'd seen he'd never be able to write another word again." Realizing he could not report this news from within Pakistan due to strict censorship, Mascarenhas fled to London with his family. He informed Sunday Times editor Harold Evans of an organized genocide by Pakistani forces. His explosive eyewitness account detailed 'kill and burn missions' against Bengalis, and the devastation of villages by "punitive action".

By publishing Mascarenhas' piece, the Sunday Times exposed the genocide and refuted Pakistan's official line. This coverage was pivotal in turning world opinion against Pakistan's actions, strengthening the Bangladesh nationalist cause. Later on, he worked for 14 years with The Sunday Times. Afterward, he was a freelance writer.

=== Recognition ===
In 1972, he was awarded the Granada's Gerald Barry Award for lifetime achievement in journalism (ceremony on What The Papers Say), as well as the International Publishing Company's Special Award for reporting on the human rights violations committed during the Bangladesh Liberation War. His article, "Genocide", in The Sunday Times on 13 June 1971 is credited with having "exposed for the first time the scale of the Pakistan army's brutal campaign to suppress its breakaway eastern province".

The BBC writes: "There is little doubt that Mascarenhas' reportage played its part in ending the war. It helped turn world opinion against Pakistan and encouraged India to play a decisive role." "Indian Prime Minister Indira Gandhi stated that Mascarenhas' article led her "'to prepare the ground for India's armed intervention'." "(...)That's why I sent in the Army, because I'd read the story of the massacre".

Mascarenhas was posthumously lauded as both a brave and "wonderful man" by Sir Harold Evans in an interview for Open Magazine.

Bangladesh's government honoured Mascarenhas's contribution to the nation during the 1971 Bangladesh Liberation War by preparing an official list of names.

== Works ==
- —— (1971). The Rape of Bangla Desh. Delhi: Vikas Publications. ISBN 0-7069-0148-7.
- —— (1986). Bangladesh: A Legacy of Blood. London: Hodder and Stoughton. ISBN 0-340-39420-X.
