= Shib Narayan Das =

Bangladeshi politician (1946–2024)

- শিব নারায়ণ দাশ
- Born: 16 December 1946; Tongibari, Bikrampur(present Munshiganj ), Bengal Province, British India (now Tongibari Upazila, Munshiganj ,Bangladesh)
- Died: 19 April 2024 (aged 77); Dhaka, Bangladesh
- Education: Comilla Zilla School
- Occupation: Student leader
- Political party: Jatiya Samajtantrik Dal

Shib Narayan Das (16 December 1946 – 19 April 2024) was a Bangladeshi designer and vexillographer, best known for designing the first iteration of the national flag of Bangladesh. His design also inspired the country's current flag. Das died in Dhaka on 19 April 2024, at the age of 77.

== Designing the national flag of Bangladesh ==
The first variant of the Bangladesh flag with the country's geopolitical outline

As desired by the then NUCLEUS (Swadhin Bangla Biplobi Parishad) by a match stick and yellow-coloured paint, he marked the map of Bangladesh over the red circle of the proposed flag in the room numbered 108 of the then Iqbal Hall of Dhaka University (DU) from midnight of 6 June until dawn of 7 June 1970. A. S. M. Abdur Rab, Shajahan Siraj, Kazi Aref Ahmed, Manirul Islam, Swapan Kumar Choudhury, Kamrul Alam Khan Khasru, Hasanul Haq Inu, Yousuf Salahuddin Ahmed and some others were also involved in it and present at that time.

On behalf of the NUCLEUS, the same flag was unfurled by Abdur Rab along with AFM Mahbubul Haq, Das and other student league leaders from the roof top of the western porch of the Arts Faculty of DU, on 2 March 1971, shortly before the outbreak of the Bangladesh Liberation War.

After the independence of Bangladesh in 1971, the map of Bangladesh was removed from the flag as it had difficulty for rendering the map correctly on both sides of the flag. Artist Quamrul Hassan was asked to report on the design, colour, shape and explanation. On 17 January 1972, the new design was made the official national flag of Bangladesh.
