= Non-cooperation movement (1971) =

East Pakistani political campaign (1971)

- Part of the independence of Bangladesh
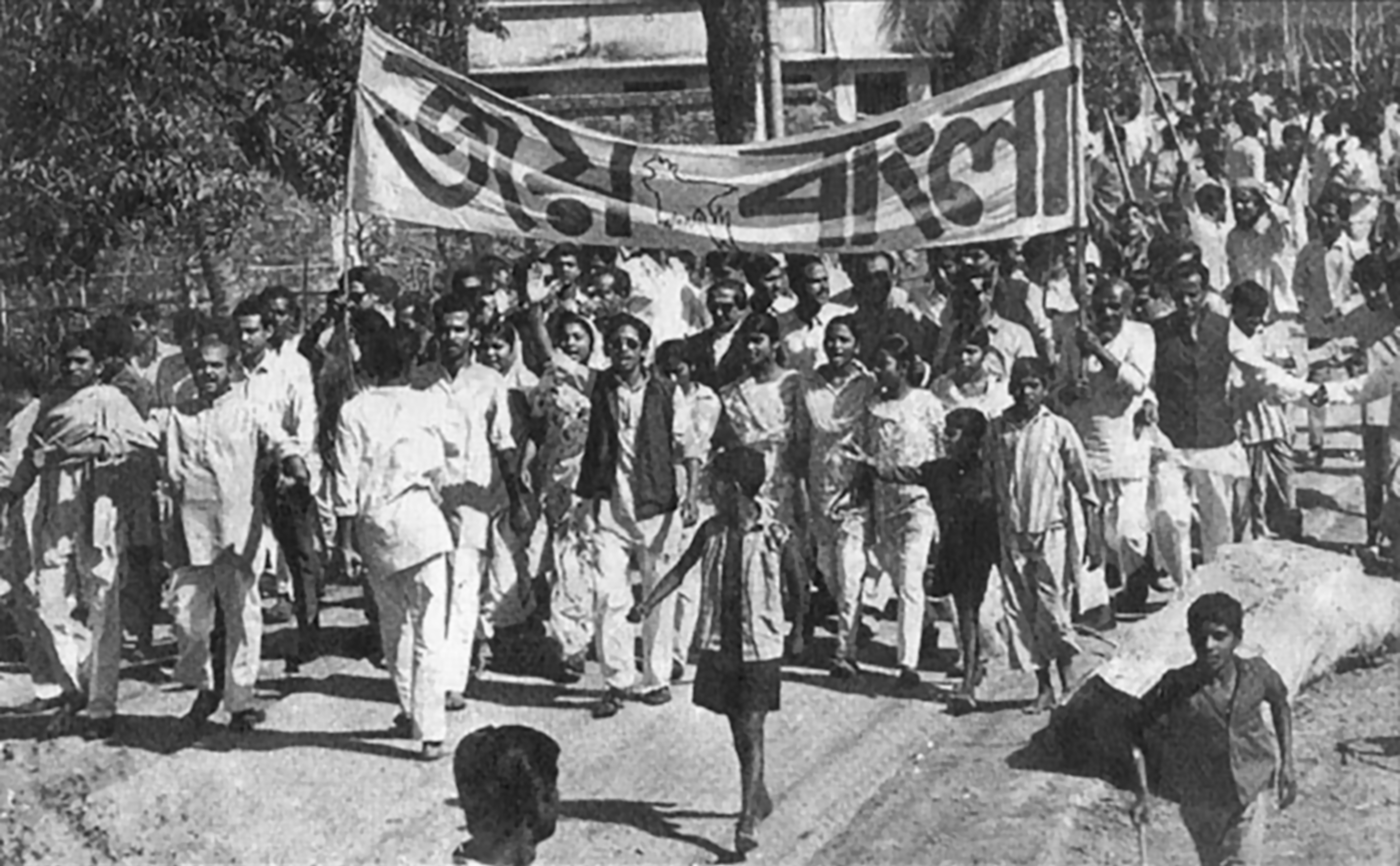
- A possession in Jessore, 1971
- Date: 1–25 March 1971
- Location: East Pakistan, Pakistan (present-day Bangladesh)
- Caused by: Suspension of the session of the National Assembly of Pakistan
- Goals: Force the military junta of Pakistan to let the newly elected Awami League create new government.
- Methods: Civil disobedience; Political demonstration; Secession; Strike action
- Result: 25 March massacre; Proclamation of Bangladeshi Independence; Disbandment of Awami League

Parties
| Awami League; East Pakistan Students' League; Swadhin Bangla Biplobi Parishad; Sarbadaliya Chhatra Sangram Parishad; East Bengal Regiment; Bengali people; Supported by: National Awami Party; East Pakistan Communist Party; Pakistan National League | Government of Pakistan; Pakistan Army; Military Intelligence; Government of East Pakistan; East Pakistan Police; Muhajir people; Supported by: Pakistan People's Party; Qayyum Muslim League; Convention Muslim League; Council Muslim League |

Lead figures
| Sheikh Mujibur Rahman; Abdul Hamid Khan Bhashani; Ataur Rahman Khan | Yahya Khan; Sahabzada Yaqub Khan; Tikka Khan; Zulfikar Ali Bhutto |

The non-cooperation movement of 1971 was a historical movement in then East Pakistan (now Bangladesh) by the Awami League and the public against the military government of Pakistan in March of that year. After the announcement of the suspension of the session of the National Assembly of Pakistan on 1 March, the spontaneous movement of the people started, but officially, on the call of Sheikh Mujibur Rahman, the non-cooperation movement started on 2 March and continued until 25 March. The movement lasted for a total of 25 days.

The main objective of this movement was to ensure the autonomy of East Pakistan from the central government of Pakistan. During this period, the control of the central government from West Pakistan over the civilian administration of East Pakistan was almost non-existent. At one stage of the movement, the whole of East Pakistan, except the cantonments, was largely under the authority of Sheikh Mujibur Rahman.

== Background ==
Partition of India in 1947

In 1940, A. K. Fazlul Huq presented the Lahore Resolution as a promoter at the All India Muslim League conference held in Lahore, Province of Punjab. The third article of the Lahore Resolution called for the creation of a number of independent and sovereign Muslim majority states in British-ruled India by specifically adjusting the boundaries of places as territories on the basis of geographical location.

But the Muslim League did not implement the article, instead amending the Lahore Resolution in the Delhi Resolution of 1946 to create a single Muslim state in the Indian subcontinent in 1947 with all Muslim-majority areas. During the partition of India, Bengal was divided into two parts by religion. The Hindu-dominated West Bengal region was incorporated into India, and the Muslim-dominated East Bengal region into Pakistan. In 1955, the name of the province of East Bengal was changed to East Pakistan.

Although East Pakistan was governed as a region of Pakistan under the One Unit Scheme, the region was discriminated against politically, financially, culturally, and militarily. Nineteen years after the establishment of Pakistan, the Awami League demanded the implementation of a federal system in the state as one of the phases of the six-point movement. The system allows the administrative regions to remain independent under the central government.

Within four years from 1966, Sheikh Mujibur Rahman, as the president of the Awami League, was able to unite the people of East Pakistan in favor of Bengali nationalism.

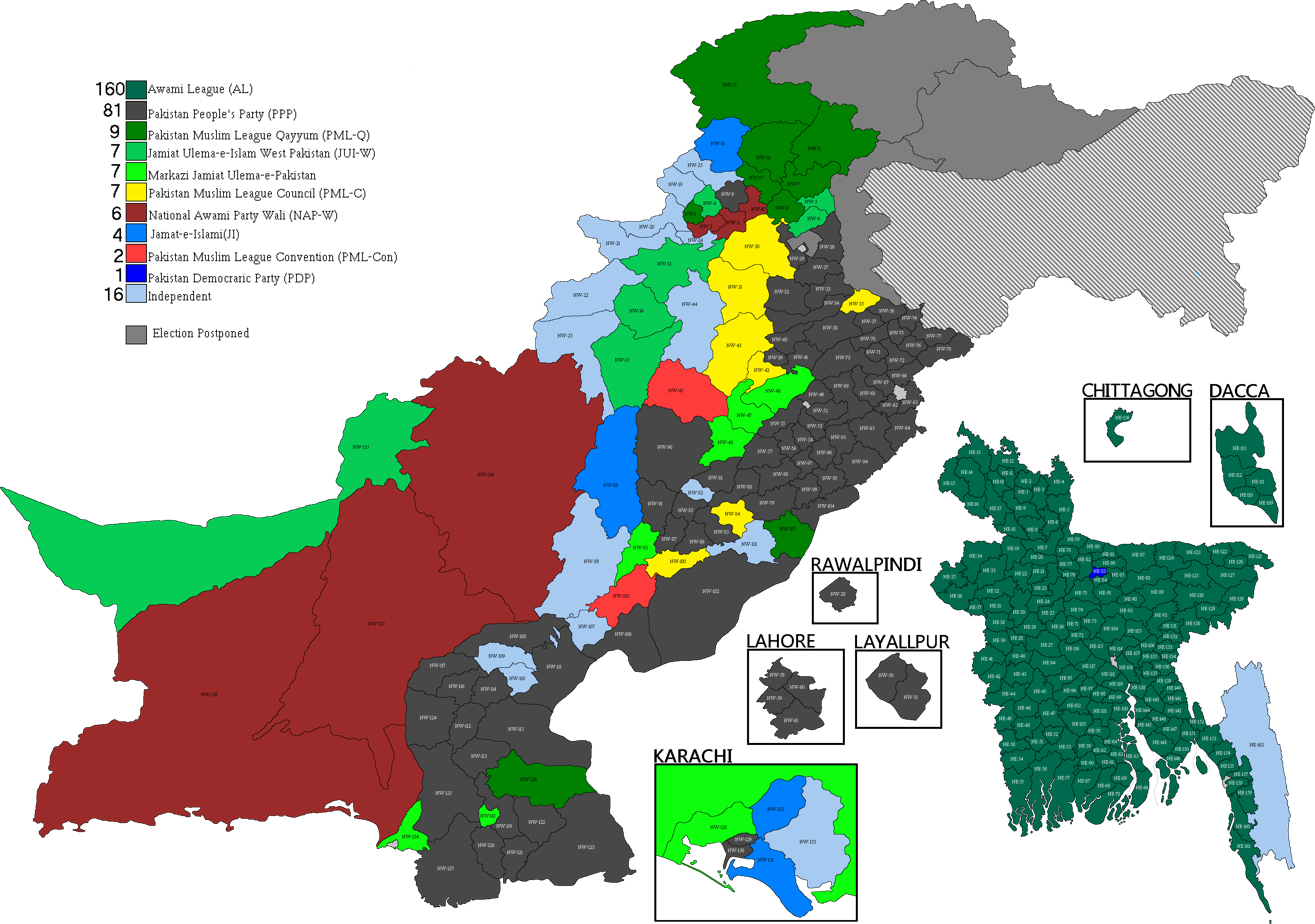
1970 General Election Results

In the 1970 general election, the Awami League won an absolute majority in the country's National Assembly, winning 167 of the 313 seats, including reserved seats for women.

As a result of this victory of the Awami League, the leaders of other political parties in West Pakistan, including the Pakistan People's Party, were afraid to realize that the implementation of the six points was inevitable. The ruling group felt that the unity of Pakistan would be destroyed if the six points were implemented.

Yahya Khan, the president of Pakistan, came to Dacca (present-day Dhaka) on 12 January 1971. He held two rounds of talks with Sheikh Mujibur Rahman. Sheikh Mujibur Rahman said about this discussion:

The talks were satisfactory and the President agreed to convene a session of the National Assembly in Dacca soon.

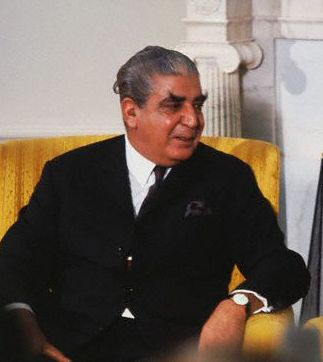
The then president of Pakistan, Yahya Khan

Similarly, before returning to West Pakistan, President Yahya Khan told reporters,

What Sheikh Mujib, the future Prime Minister of the country said about the talks with him, is absolutely correct.

Returning to West Pakistan, he went to Zulfiqar Ali Bhutto's residence in Larkana and held a secret meeting with the generals.

Then Zulfikar Ali Bhutto came to Dacca with other leaders of the party on the 27th, 28th, and 29th and held several rounds of meetings with Sheikh Mujibur Rahman and other top leaders of the Awami League at Hotel Intercontinental.

In the meeting on the 27th, Sheikh Mujibur Rahman rejected Bhutto's offer to form an alliance and share power. After the meeting, Sheikh Mujibur Rahman planned to organize a meeting of the National Assembly by 15 February and formulate a constitution based on the six points, but Zulfiqar Ali Bhutto further discussed. He expressed the opinion that it is necessary to do.

He proposed to hold a session of the National Assembly at the end of March. However, President Yahya Khan convened a session of the National Assembly on 3 March. But on 15 February, Zulfiqar Ali Bhutto announced that he and his party would not attend the session unless the Awami League compromised on their 6 points or changed them.

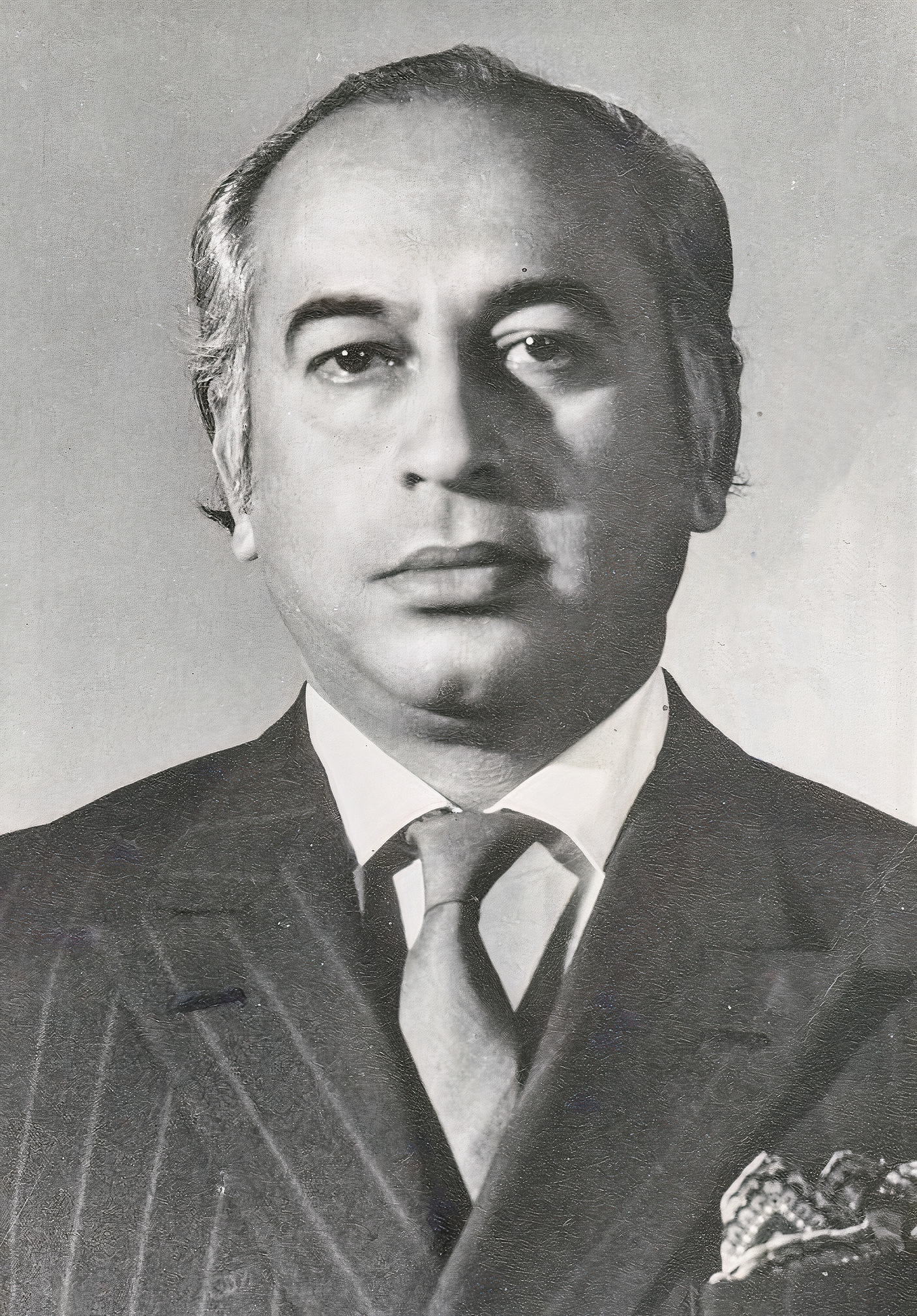
Pakistan Peoples Party leader Zulfikar Ali Bhutto

Four days later, on 19 February, Yahya Khan discussed with Zulfikar Ali Bhutto about the next step. After the meeting, Bhutto repeated the same claim. He remained adamant about not attending the session if the Awami League did not meet his conditions.

On 28 February, he warned that he would start agitation if the session started without his party. He also threatened to kill members of the Constituent Assembly who wanted to attend the session from West Pakistan in Dacca.

Sheikh Mujibur Rahman understood that the West Pakistanis were planning to sabotage the election results. So he was making tough decisions day by day. President Yahya Khan, in consultation with Bhutto, adjourned the National Assembly session indefinitely on 1 March. As a result, the people of Bengal burst into anger; the movement began.

== Initial phase (1–7 March) ==
=== 1 March ===
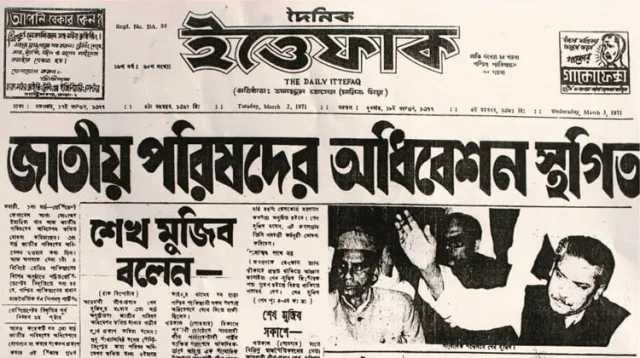
A copy of The Daily Ittefaq, which was published the next day, covered the events of 1 March

General Yahya Khan announced the adjournment of the National Assembly session on 1 March 1971 at 1:50 PM (UTC+6) on 1 March 1971, following a threat by Zulfikar Ali Bhutto, the leader of Pakistan's second largest party, the Pakistan People's Party.

During this announcement, the ongoing cricket match between International XI and BCCP at the Dacca Stadium was stopped in the face of public protests. The student crowd went into a spontaneous movement without any guidance from Sheikh Mujibur Rahman. The students first gathered in groups at Battala of the University of Dacca and decided to hold a public meeting at Paltan Maidan.

On that day, the members of the Awami League parliamentary party, including Sheikh Mujibur Rahman, were busy drafting the constitution based on the 6 points at Hotel Purbani, so the angry crowd gathered in front of the hotel. There, the crowd burned the Pakistani flag and pictures of Muhammad Ali Jinnah. Sheikh Mujibur Rahman then held a press conference and advised everyone to continue the movement peacefully. He simultaneously announced a hartal until 2 pm on 2 and 3 March and decided to hold a public meeting at the Race Course Maidan on 7 March.

That evening, Muhammad Iqbal Hall and Muhammad Ali Jinnah Hall of Dacca University were renamed as Shahid Sergeant Zahurul Haque Hall and Surya Sen Hall, respectively.

On this day, under the instruction of Sheikh Mujibur Rahman, Nur-e-Alam Siddiqui, Shajahan Siraj, A. S. M. Abdur Rab, and Abdul Kuddas Makhan founded the Swadhin Bangla Chhatra Sangram Parishad (lit. 'Independent Bengal Student Struggle Council') in the afternoon after a secret meeting.

=== 2 March ===
A. S. M. Abdur Rab, the then vice-president of DUCSU and the first national flag hoister of Bangladesh

On this day, the "Independent Bengal Student Struggle Council" under the leadership of A. S. M. Abdur Rab, the vice-president of Dhaka University Central Students' Union, was the first to raise the flag of independent Bangladesh with its map.

On this day Sahabzada Yaqub Khan was appointed Governor of East Pakistan. Despite martial law and the imposition of a curfew from 7 pm to 7 am, widespread agitation continued. A strike was observed in Dacca till 2 pm. The movement was fired upon. At Paltan Maidan, Sheikh Mujibur Rahman called for a nationwide strike until 3 March and announced his decision to address the nation on 7 March. He also said that the program of the movement to achieve autonomy would be outlined in the speech. (Note: According to Anthony Mascarenhas, the people of East Pakistan pressured Sheikh Mujibur Rahman to declare independence for the region, but he refused to do so.)

On the same day, the East Bengal Labor Movement handed over pamphlets to people calling to Sheikh Mujibur Rahman for the independence of East Pakistan by fighting against the central government of Pakistan. In the evening, Awami League's branch in Karachi held discussions with Pakistani political parties. The Pakistan People's Party was absent from the discussion aimed at the latest political situation in Pakistan. In the meeting, the Awami League demanded to hold the National Assembly session by 7 March.

On this day, there were reports of looting of shops by unknown perpetrators in various parts of East Pakistan. The people resisted the looters and burnt the looted goods. A curfew was imposed in Dacca through radio announcements at night. When the students broke the curfew and took out a procession at night, they were fired upon in different parts of the city.

=== 3 March ===
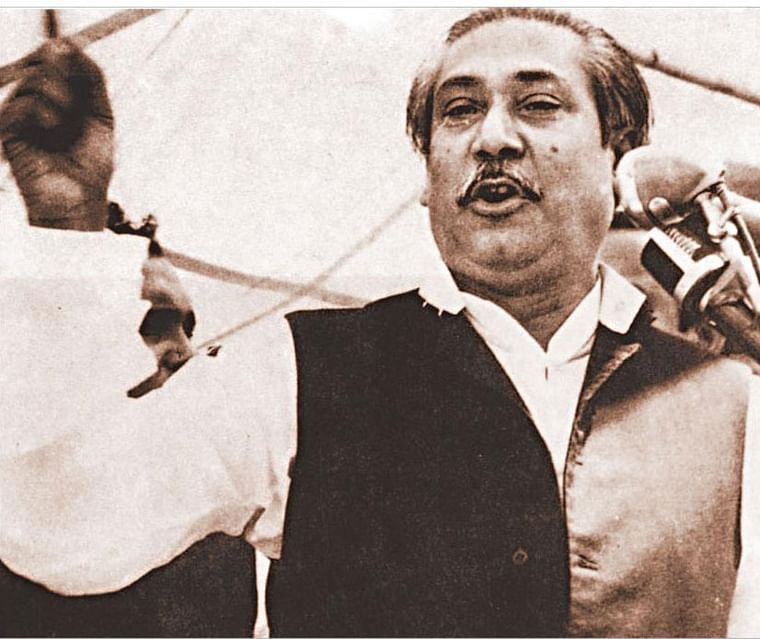
Sheikh Mujibur Rahman in the rally of Paltan

On this day, in the presence of Sheikh Mujibur Rahman at Paltan Maidan, under the banner of the Student Struggle Council, Shajahan Siraj, the then general secretary of the Students' League, announced the independence manifesto of Bangladesh. It declared East Pakistan to become an independent and sovereign state called Bangladesh as well as defining its goals. (Note: Three objectives were set. They are: creation of independent Bengali state "Bangladesh", introduction of socialist economy to eliminate inequality in the independent country and establishment of democracy in the independent country.) is It also declared Sheikh Mujibur Rahman as the Commander-in-Chief of sovereign Bangladesh.

On this day, almost all government, semi-government and autonomous offices and institutions of East Pakistan, the Secretariat, the High Court and other courts, Pakistan International Airlines, railways and all other communication media, industrial and commercial institutions were observed in all places in the country, and meetings and marches were held. A procession was held on this day with the bodies of several people who had been shot dead the previous night. Many places in East Pakistan were shot at during these processions. As a result, 75 people were shot dead in Chittagong besides 23 people in the city of Dacca. Curfew was imposed in Dacca, Rangpur, and Sylhet.

Yahya Khan announced the decision to hold a conference of leaders in Dacca on 10 March and promised to start the National Assembly session within two weeks of this conference. Zulfiqar Ali Bhutto agreed, but Sheikh Mujibur Rahman rejected it. Sheikh Mujibur Rahman told Bhutto that if the Bhuttos did not want to accept a democratically constituted system of governance, then a separate system of governance would be created for East Pakistan.

At night, when troops and goods were disembarked from the MV Swat ship at Chittagong port, a clash broke out between the army and the protesting sailors. Seven army personnel were tried by a court-martial and sentenced to death by the Pakistan Army after refusing to open fire on the protesters.

=== 4 March ===
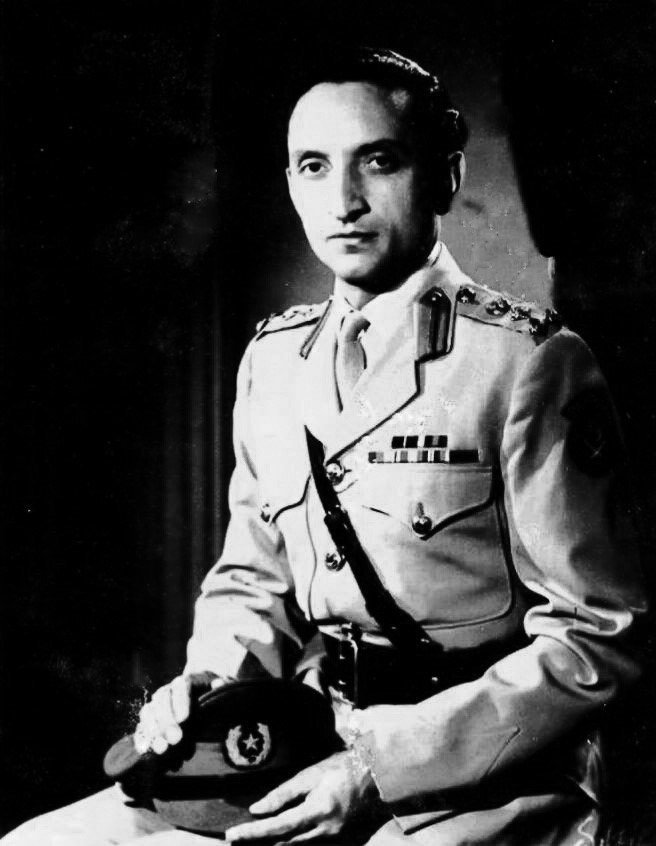
Sahebzada Yakub Khan acted as Governor of East Pakistan from 2 to 4 March

Curfew was lifted from the provincial capital. But Martial Law No. 113 was issued in the district and hill tracts area in Chittagong. East Pakistani artists and journalists joined the movement. On this day, Abdul Hamid Khan Bhashani, the president of the National Awami Party, demanded the rights of the people of this country based on the Lahore Resolution of 1940. Sahibzada Yakub Khan, the chief martial law administrator of East Pakistan, resigned as the situation deteriorated.

East Pakistani politician Nurul Amin called on Yahya Khan to convene a session of the National Assembly that day. At a press conference in Karachi, Asghar Khan called on the central government to give power to Awami League to maintain the unity of Pakistan.

On this day, Radio Pakistan and the Dhaka center of Pakistan Television, the government television channel, changed their names to Dacca Betar Kendro, lit. 'Dacca Radio Centre' and Dacca Television respectively. (Note: Currently known as Bangladesh Betar and Bangladesh Television, respectively.) From this day to 6 March, Sheikh Mujib ordered a strike from six in the morning to two in the afternoon.

=== 5 March ===
The movement continued. 4 people were killed and 25 were injured in the shooting in Tongi. As a result of firing in Chittagong, the death toll has increased to 138. Curfew was again imposed in Rangpur and Rajshahi. The teachers of the University of Dacca and East Pakistan University of Engineering and Technology joined the movement.

From this day, on the orders of Sheikh Mujib, all government and private offices, banks, and ration shops are open from 2.30 pm to 4.00 pm only for urgent needs and for the purpose of paying salaries to employees.

Bhutto and other leaders of the People's Party had a long meeting with Yahya Khan in Rawalpindi. After the meeting, the spokesperson of the party, Abdul Hafiz Pirzada, called the response of the Awami League unwanted and unreasonable in view of the suspension of the National Assembly session.

An absentee funeral prayer for those killed in the ongoing movement in East Pakistan was organized in Lahore, West Pakistan. Prayers and prayers are offered in memory of the victims after Friday prayers in various mosques of East Pakistan.

=== 6 March ===
General Yahya Khan, in his address to the nation, announced that the National Assembly session would be held on 25 March. Tikka Khan was appointed as the governor of East Pakistan. Flights of Pakistan over Indian airspace remain banned.

After Yahya Khan's speech, an emergency joint meeting of the executive committee of the central and eastern branches of the Pakistani Awami League was held. After several hours of closed-door meetings, Sheikh Mujibur Rahman refused to enter into negotiations with Yahya Khan "trampling on the blood of martyrs".

14 people were injured and 1 person was killed in Rajshahi that day. 86 people were injured and 18 people were killed in Khulna. On the other hand, 341 prisoners escaped by breaking the gate of Dhaka Central Jail.

=== 7 March ===
On this day, Sheikh Mujibur Rahman delivered the historic 7 March speech to the nation at Race Course Maidan (now Suhrawardy Udyan) in Dhaka. In his speech, he said that if 4 conditions are fulfilled, he will join the session. They are:

1. Martial law must be withdrawn immediately.
2. Military men should go back to barracks.
3. Genocide must be investigated
4. Power must be transferred to the people's representatives.

He forbade the people of Bengal to pay taxes. All the courts of East Pakistan, including the secretariat, other government and semi-government offices, the eastern branch of the Supreme Court, and the Dacca High Court, were asked to remain closed. However, he allowed to keep the bank open only for 2 hours daily. Allowed all types of bus-trucks, rickshaws, and taxis for the transportation of civilians other than the military.

Dacca Betar was shut down that day in protest of Bengali activists for not airing this speech. The angry crowd threw bombs in front of the Betar building at seven in the evening.

That day President Yahya Khan appointed five military officers, including Lieut. General Amir Abdullah Khan Niazi, as Assistant Military Administrators.

== Middle phase (8–15 March) ==
=== 8 March ===
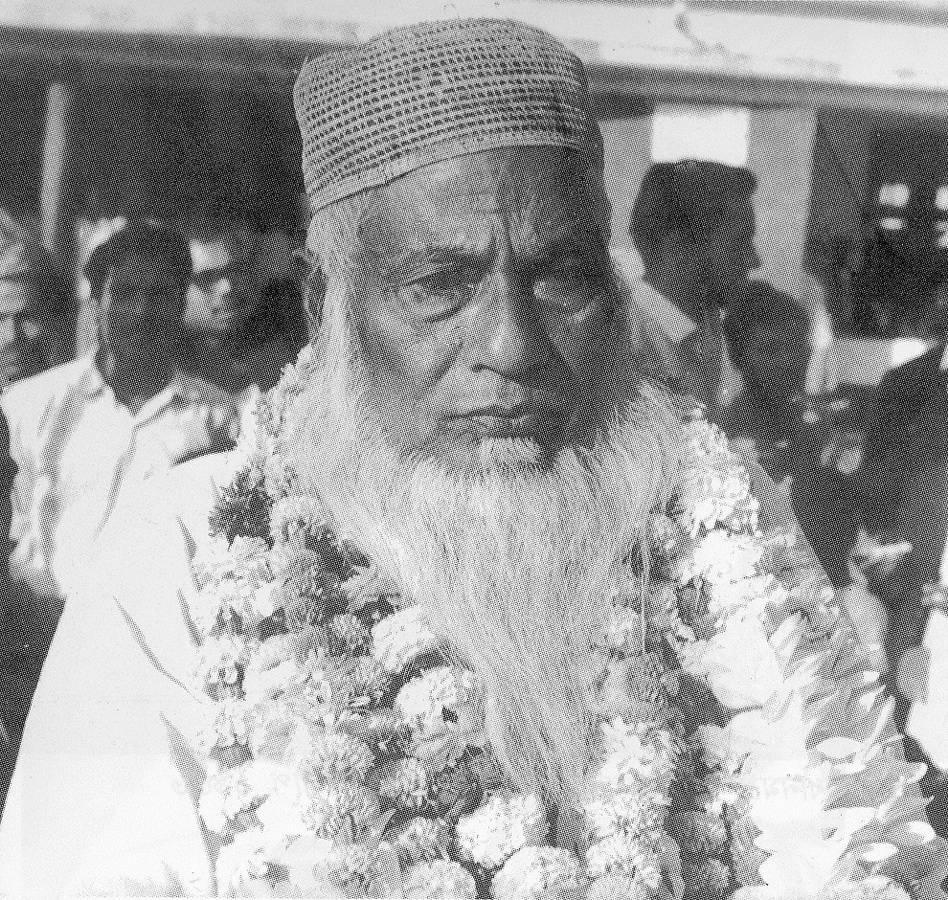
NAP leader Maulana Abdul Hamid Khan Bhasani

The non-cooperation movement took a new form after Sheikh Mujibur Rahman's speech on 7 March. Student leaders declared solidarity with this speech. Sheikh Mujibur Rahman's speech will be aired - on this condition the radio workers joined the work. Students' League leaders proposed to form 'Swadhin Bangladesh Chhatra Sangam Parishad' (lit. 'Independent Bangladesh Students Struggle Council') on this day.

Although the speech of 7 March was not broadcast the previous day, due to the pressure of the situation, this speech was broadcast from Dacca Betar at 8:30 am. It is also relayed from other radio stations in East Pakistan.

An official press note claimed that 172 people were killed and 358 injured in the ongoing agitation. But on behalf of the Awami League, the party's general secretary, Tajuddin Ahmad, protested this press note of the military authorities and complained that the number of casualties had been greatly reduced.

As per Sheikh Mujibur Rahman's 7 March speech, all government offices began to come to a standstill. Tikka Khan came to Dhaka on this day to serve as the military governor of East Pakistan.

In a statement at night, Tajuddin Ahmad explained the various instructions announced by Bangabandhu in his 7 March speech. There are mentions:

1. The bank will be open from 9 am to 3 pm. Besides, it is said to keep the Post Office Savings Bank open. According to the directive, banks are only allowed to transact within Bangladesh (actually East Pakistan). Besides, customers are allowed to pay up to a maximum of Rs. 1,000.
2. Essential areas for electricity, water, gas, and fertilizer supply and diesel supply to power pumps were ordered to remain operational.

Also on that day, share prices of East Pakistan-based companies on the Karachi Stock Exchange fell sharply.

=== 9 March ===
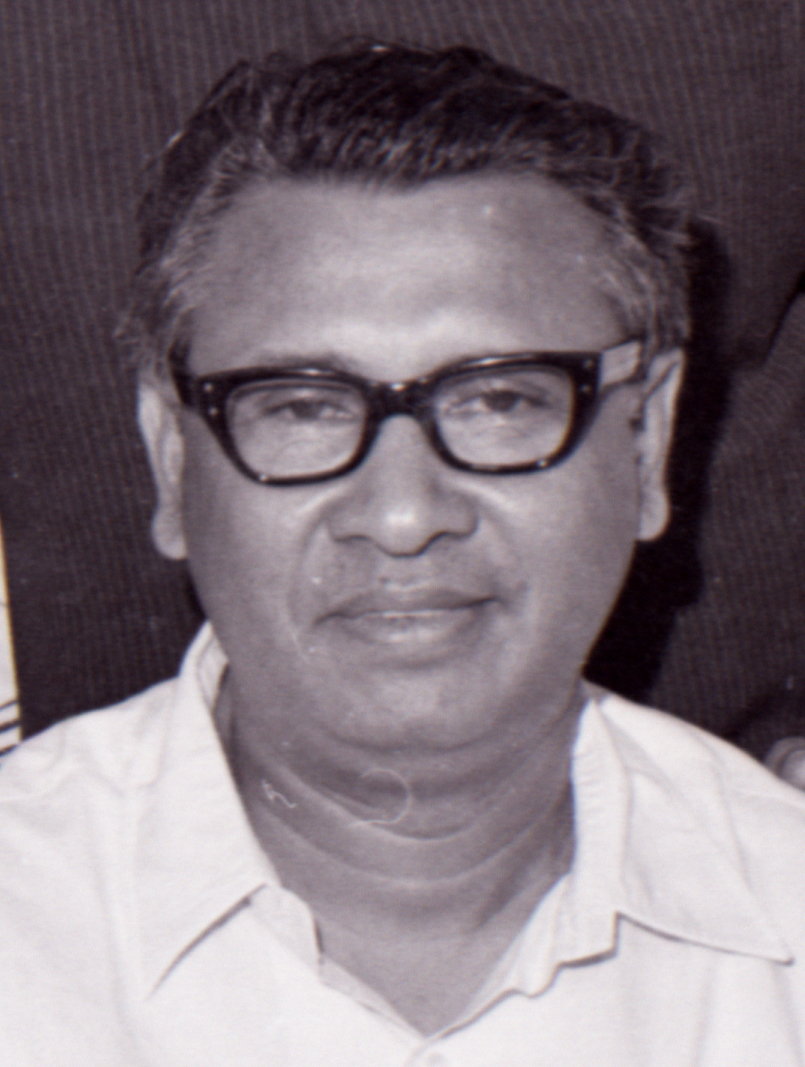
Tajuddin Ahmad, the general secretary of Awami League at that time

On this day, the control over the civil administration of East Pakistan by the central government almost stopped. As a result, the then general secretary of Awami League, Tajuddin Ahmad, issued 16-point instructions on behalf of Awami League for the management of civil administration. Pakistan National League leader Ataur Rahman Khan and Students' League leaders advised Sheikh Mujibur Rahman to form a "Bangladesh National Government" that day.

On this day, NAP leader Maulana Abdul Hamid Khan Bhasani and Sheikh Mujibur Rahman discussed the political situation of the country. That afternoon, in a speech at Paltan Maidan, Maulana Bhasani announced his decision to join forces with Sheikh Mujibur Rahman. He also asked Yahya Khan to accept the independence of East Bengal. He also announced that if no effective action was taken by the government by 25 March, he would launch a simultaneous mass movement like in 1952.

Tikka Khan took over the duties of Chief Martial Law Administrator on this day. But Badruddin Ahmed Siddiky, Chief Justice of East Pakistan, told him that he was unable to take the oath.

On this day, the military authorities issued an indefinite curfew in the city of Rajshahi for the next 8 hours from 9 pm.

Citizens of other countries in Dhaka landed in the city to take back their respective countries. The UN Secretary-General ordered the removal of their workers from Dhaka if necessary. On the same day, the East Pakistan Communist Party called on the people to fight for the independence of East Pakistan.

=== 10 March ===
On this day, actors and other artists of the country, led by poet Golam Mustafa and Khan Ataur Rahman, protested under the banner of 'Disgruntled Artist Society'. Class II Bengali employees of the Pakistan Civil Service expressed their loyalty to the Awami League-led movement.

On this day, black flags were hoisted at various places across the country as part of the protest. Even government and private office buildings, Rajarbagh Police Line, various police stations, and the house of the Chief Justice of Dhaka High Court were also hoisted.

The indefinite night curfew issued in Rajshahi city was withdrawn today.

On this day, the armed ship 'MV Swat' from West Pakistan arrived at Chittagong port and anchored. But the dockworkers refused to take the weapons off the ship. The military attempted to lower the weapons, but the crowd successfully resisted.

On this day, Zulfikar Ali Bhutto offered to meet Sheikh Mujibur Rahman in a telegram message, pleading to save the state.

=== 11 March ===
Bhutto, the leader of the PPP, sent a telegram to Sheikh Mujibur Rahman to come to Dacca to agree to negotiate. As Khulna Newsprint Mill stopped sending paper to West Pakistan from 1 March, the quality of various newspapers, including Dawn, decreased drastically from that day on due to the lack of newsprint.

A statement from the Swadhin Bangla Chhatra Sangam Parishad called for the boycott of titles and medals given by the government. Therefore, on that day, U Thant, the then Secretary General of the United Nations, ordered all their officers and employees working in East Pakistan to return to the United Nations Headquarters.

Tajuddin Ahmed, on behalf of the Awami League, published 14-point instructions for the purpose of the common people for the management of civil administration. Also on this day representatives of various parties of West Pakistan met with Sheikh Mujib.

A ship named 'Vintage Horizon' carrying 32 thousand tons of wheat from the United States of America was coming to Chittagong Port for Pakistan. But the Pakistani government ordered the ship to go to Karachi port that day.

=== 12 March ===
On this day, Awami League ordered the formation of Sangram Parishad in every union of the province. Bengali CSP and EPCS officers working in East Pakistan, employees of government and semi-government and autonomous organizations supported the movement. The CSP officers donated their one-day salary to the fund of Awami League on this day. The owners announced the closure of all movie theaters in East Pakistan for an indefinite period. They donated Rs. 13,250 to the Awami League relief fund for the movement.

In view of the ongoing movement, the military government announced the cancellation of all pre-scheduled events including the parade of the Armed Forces, awarding of titles, to be held on the occasion of Pakistan's Republic Day on 23 March. Awami League leader Muhammad Mansur Ali expressed deep concern and condemnation that the US food cargo ship sent to East Pakistan was diverted to Karachi instead of Chittagong. Maulana Bhasani reiterated his support for Awami League in a public meeting in Mymensingh that day.

On this day, 27 prisoners escaped from the jail in Bogra. 1 inmate was killed and 15 wounded by guards during the escape.

=== 13 March ===
All salaried officers and employees from the defense sector were ordered to join the workplace on the morning of 15 March. If the order is not obeyed, they are threatened with dismissal from the job. Calling it provocative, Sheikh Mujibur Rahman strongly opposed this decision.

265 officials from West Germany, the United States, the United Kingdom, Italy, Canada, France and the United Nations were sent back to their respective countries from Dacca.

On the same day, the leaders of various opposition parties in West Pakistan such as Council Muslim League, Convention Muslim League, Jamiat Ulema-e-Islam, Jamiat Ulema-e-Pakistan organized a meeting regarding the ongoing situation. PPP and Pakistan Muslim League (Qayyum) were absent from the meeting. At the end of the meeting, they demanded immediate transfer of power to Awami League to prevent the inevitable disintegration of Pakistan. Abdul Hakeem Chowdhury and Zainul Abedin renounced their titles in support of the movement.

=== 14 March ===
Zulfiqar Ali Bhutto proposed to Yahya Khan the formula to give power to Awami League in East Pakistan and PPP in West Pakistan, i.e. two parties in two Pakistans. The leaders of almost all the political parties in Pakistan at the time except Muslim League's Abdul Qayyum Khan criticized this stubborn and undemocratic decision.

Western industrialists affected by the non-cooperation movement submitted a memorandum to the military government to accept Sheikh Mujibur Rahman's four points.

Sheikh Mujibur Rahman published an instruction book containing 35 instructions regarding the movement. The purpose of these instructions was to inform how to manage the movement without harming the country's economy.

=== 15 March ===
On this day, the control of Sheikh Mujibur Rahman and Awami League was established in all areas of the province except the cantonments.

Yahya Khan came to Dacca that day to discuss with Sheikh Mujibur Rahman. His itinerary was secret. He did not speak to reporters at the airport.

There were massive protests in West Pakistan against Bhutto's proposal to give power to two parties in two Pakistans. Leaders of other parties in West Pakistan strongly opposed his decision, calling it undemocratic.

== Final phase (16–25 March) ==
=== 16 March ===
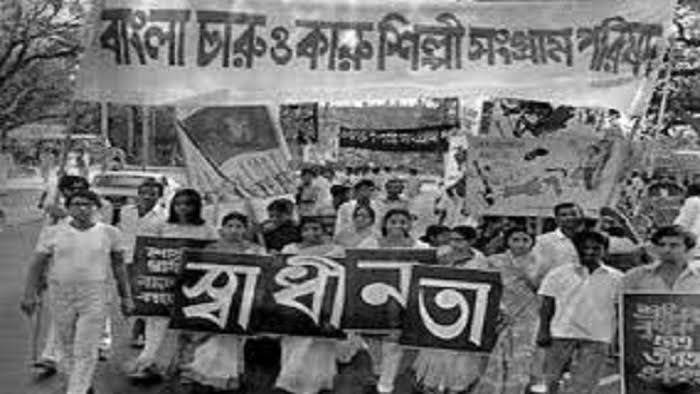
A procession led by Zainul Abedin and Sufia Kamal on 16 March

A report published in Newsweek that day said that he actually declared independence in his 7 March speech.

A meeting began between Sheikh Mujibur Rahman and Yahya Khan. After discussing with local leaders, he went to the President's House. On his way to the meeting, Sheikh Mujibur Rahman rode in a white car with a black flag on the front and a map of Bangladesh on the window shield.

In the meeting, Yahya Khan expressed his regret to Sheikh Mujibur Rahman for the previous incidents and wished to solve the problem politically. Then he said that he accepted the 4-point condition of power transfer proposed by Awami League. The terms were – removal of military rule and transfer of power to a democratic government, transfer of power to majority political parties in each province, retention of Yahya Khan's presidency as head of the central government, and two Pakistani members of the National Assembly meeting separately.

=== 17 March ===
On this day, the second round of talks took place between Sheikh Mujibur Rahman and Yahya Khan. However, neither the military government nor the Awami League have disclosed details about this discussion.

On this day, in a public meeting in Chittagong, the president of NAP, Maulana Abdul Hamid Khan Bhasani, called to celebrate that day as 'Independent East Bengal Day' instead of the Republic Day of Pakistan on 23 March.

The government formed a five-member inquiry committee to investigate the ongoing killings from 1 March. But that inquiry committee was rejected by Sheikh Mujibur Rahman. On the same day, Yahya Khan ordered Khadim Hussain Raja to finally implement Operation Searchlight.

=== 18 March ===
There was no meeting between Sheikh Mujibur Rahman and Yahya Khan on that day.

Awami League rejected the aforementioned inquiry committee. On the other hand, another 3-member inquiry committee consist of Khondaker Mostaq Ahmad, Abidur Reza Khan and Muhammad Mansur Ali was created by Awami League.

=== 19 March ===
The fourth meeting between Sheikh Mujibur Rahman and Yahya Khan took place. It was decided in the meeting that the next day Sheikh Mujibur Rahman and Yahya Khan would discuss with their advisors. Therefore, on this day, a separate meeting was held between the advisory councils. On behalf of Yahya Khan, Gul Hassan Khan, Lieutenant General S.G.M.M Pirzada and Alvin Robert Cornelius and Tajuddin Ahmed, Kamal Hossain and Syed Nazrul Islam participated on behalf of Awami League. On this day they had a meeting about the topic of the next day's discussion. But during the negotiations, Pak forces opened fire on the crowd in Rangpur, Syedpur and Joydevpur. The Bengalis were able to resist the Pakistani army in Jaidebpur. Sheikh Mujibur Rahman said that he would not join the parliament unless there was an impartial investigation into the massacre by the army.

=== 20 March ===
That day, Sheikh Mujibur Rahman came to discuss with 6 representatives of Awami League (top leaders) named Syed Nazrul Islam, Khandaker Mostaq Ahmed, Tajuddin Ahmed, Kamal Hossain, M. Mansoor Ali and Abul Hasnat Muhammad Qamaruzzaman. On the other hand, among the representatives of Yahya Khan was Lieutenant General S.G.M.M Pirzada, AR Cornelius, and Col Hassan. Representatives of both sides met twice.

After the meeting, Sheikh Mujibur Rahman reported some progress in the discussion. He also informed that he and his advisers will meet with the President and his advisers the next day.

On this day, the government asked all civilians of the country to submit their licensed weapons to the nearest police station.

=== 21 March ===
On that day, in the meeting between Sheikh Mujibur Rahman and Yahya Khan, the then General Secretary of Awami League Tajuddin Ahmed helped Sheikh Mujibur Rahman in the discussion.

Leader of PPP along with 12 advisors came to Dacca to join the discussion. Maulana Bhasani called everyone in Chittagong to join the movement under the leadership of Awami League.

The Central Chhatra Sangram Parishad began preparations to observe Pakistan Day as "Resistance Day" on this day. Other political and social organizations supported their proposals. From Pakistan Day, the Swadhin Bangladesh Sramik Sangam Parishad (lit. 'Independent Bangladesh Labour Struggle Council') called for a boycott of West Pakistani products.

=== 22 March ===
As Sheikh Mujibur Rahman was adamant about not attending the session of the National Assembly if martial law was not withdrawn, President Yahya Khan again announced the suspension of the session of the National Assembly.

Tripartite talks were held between Sheikh Mujibur Rahman, Yahya Khan and Zulfikar Ali Bhutto. Also on this day there was a discussion between four advisers of Yahya Khan and five lawyers of Pakistan Peoples Party. With the argument of legal complications, they strongly opposed giving power to Sheikh Mujibur Rahman by withdrawing martial law before the session. Also on this day President Yahya Khan discussed this issue with other leaders of West Pakistan.

Zulfikar Ali Bhutto opposed the demand of Awami League to abolish military rule and transfer power to a democratic government by president, saying that if Awami League's demand is implemented, the president's order will lose legal validity by creating a constitutional vacuum. However, in a written statement on this day, A. K. Brohi stated that the 4 clauses in the transfer of power were not inconsistent with the law.

=== 23 March ===
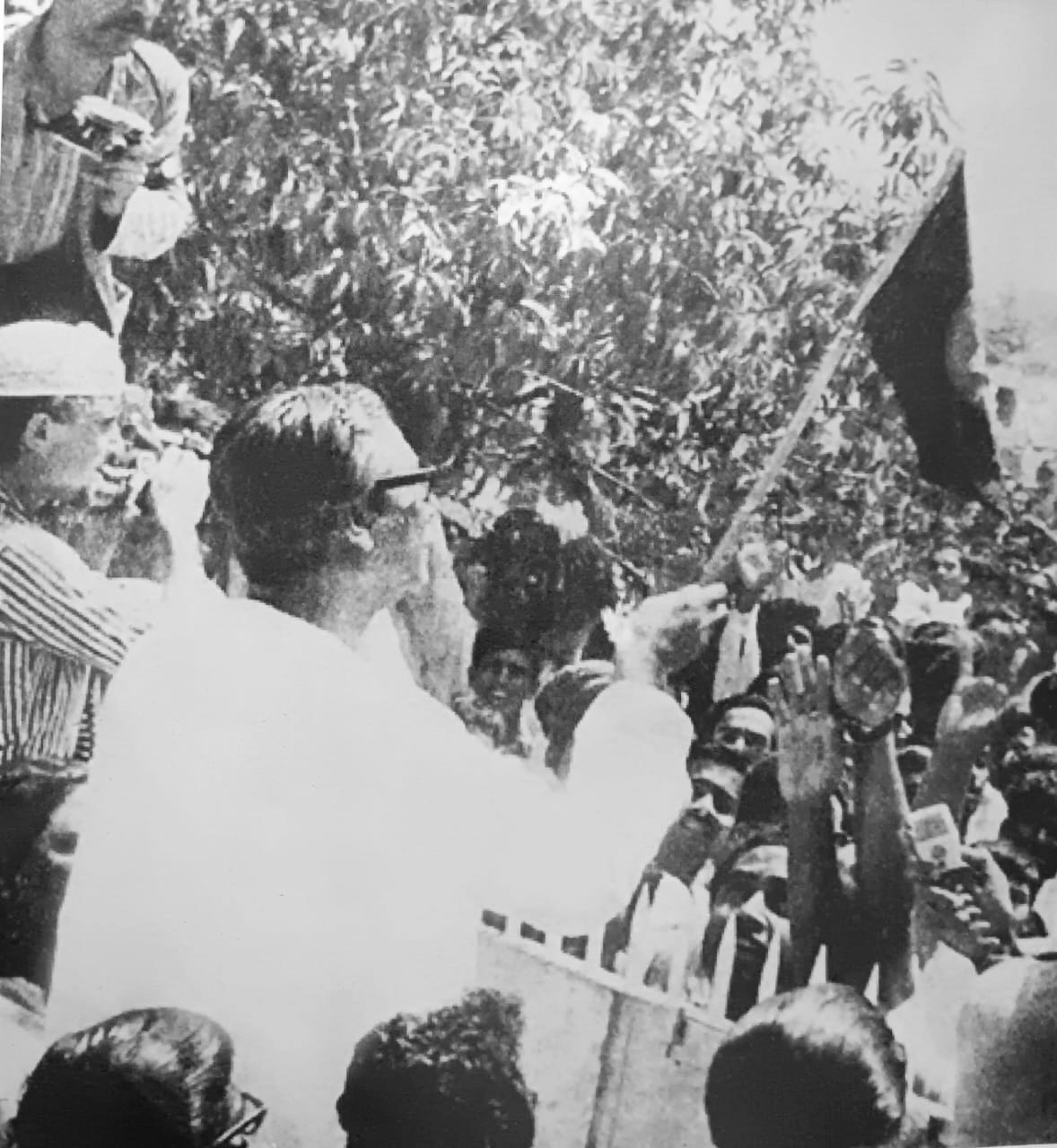
Sheikh Mujibur Rahman waving the Flag of Bangladesh towards the crowd in front his residence at 32 Dhanmondi on 23 March 1971

On this day, the flag with the map of independent Bangladesh was hoisted in place of the Pakistani flag everywhere in East Pakistan, except the cantonment, airport and governor's house. On this day, Sheikh Mujibur Rahman officially hoisted this flag for the first time at his house on Road No. 32 in Dhanmondi. According to his pre-announced instructions, a general holiday is observed across the country on this day. Maulana Bhasani's NAP observed the Pakistan Day as 'Independent East Bengal Day'.

On this day, the flag of independent Bangladesh was hoisted at the diplomatic offices of different countries in Dacca. The flag of independent Bengal was hoisted at the British Sub-High Commission and the Soviet Consulate in the morning. The embassies of China, Indonesia, Iran and Nepal, Pakistan's ally at the time, first hoisted Pakistani flags, but later the students lowered them and hoisted the map-embossed Bangladesh flag. However, no flag was hoisted at the US consulate in Dacca that day.

Due to the unstable situation in the country, President of Pakistan Yahya Khan canceled the scheduled Republic Day speech and issued a written statement.

Although there was no discussion between Sheikh Mujibur Rahman and Yahya Khan on that day, there was a discussion between Awami League and President Yahya Khan's advisers. Awami League representatives presented the draft proposal of the 6-point system of governance. In the evening, the economic aspects of the regime were discussed again.

Zulfikar Ali Bhutto held a meeting with President Yahya Khan and his Chief Secretary Lt. Gen. Pirzada on this day. Also, leaders of various political parties from West Pakistan came to Dacca and held a meeting with Yahya Khan that day.

On the same day, riots between Bengalis and Muhajirs took place in several places in East Pakistan instigated by the Pakistan Army. During the riots there were casualties from army firing.

=== 24 March ===
Awami League and President Yahya Khan and his advisers discussed the economic sections of the draft constitution proposed on the 24rd.

On this day, Awami League representatives proposed a confederation instead of federation in the draft constitution. But the government opposed it as it was in conflict with the constitution of Awami League.

President Yahya Khan held a meeting with People's Party leader Zulfikar Ali Bhutto on that day, but most West Pakistani political party leaders left East Pakistan.

Sheikh Mujibur Rahman advised to strengthen the movement on this day. Tajuddin Ahmad demanded the announcement of the President as soon as possible.

Muhajir residents in Mirpur, with the help of Pakistani army intelligence, lowered Bangladeshi flags and black flags from the roofs of Bengali houses there and set them on fire, causing panic in the area.

The Pakistan Army unloaded its weapons from the MV Swat in Chittagong port and faced strong resistance from fifty thousand people.

=== 25 March ===
Bhutto held talks with Yahya Khan for 45 minutes that morning. After the discussion, in response to reporters' questions about the proposed autonomy of East Pakistan, Bhutto said that the Awami League's proposed autonomy was not real but rather close to sovereignty.

In addition, Sheikh Mujibur Rahman through a press release announced changes in the points contained in the instructions and added a new point. In addition, the Awami League issued a press release in which the party claimed that Yahya Khan had agreed to hand over power to their party and that they Expect the President to make an announcement in this regard.

On the same day, during the unloading of arms from the MV Swat at the Chittagong port, the general public obstructed it. Pakistani forces opened fire to avoid the obstacle. After that, curfew or evening law was issued in various parts of East Pakistan due to extreme protests across the country.

The Awami League called a nationwide strike on 27 March to protest the killing of 110 people by Pakistani forces firing on civilians in Joydevpur, Rangpur and Syedpur. On this day, the full report of the draft regime was supposed to be presented to President Yahya Khan, but that meeting did not take place. President Yahya Khan secretly left Dhaka at 4:45 pm on that day.

Zulfiqar Ali Bhutto announced his return to Karachi on 26 March after receiving the news of Yahya Khan's departure from East Pakistan. At a 9pm meeting held at his residence, an hour after receiving the news of Yahya Khan leaving Dhaka, Sheikh Mujibur Rahman expressed fear that he might be killed and Yahya Khan wanted to solve the problem by force of arms. However, he then expressed hope that an independent country called Bangladesh would be created in the future.

== Ending and aftermath ==
Position of Pakistani targets in Dacca as part of Operation Searchlight on the night of 25 March.

On the pretext of protecting the unity of Pakistan and stopping the ongoing non-cooperation movement, Pakistani forces led by Tikka Khan, Rao Farman Ali, and Khadim Hussain Raja carried out indiscriminate massacres of unarmed sleeping Bengalis in Dhaka from 11:30 pm on 25 March. The non-cooperation movement officially ended when Sheikh Mujibur Rahman was reported to declare independence in Bangladesh that night (early hours of 26 March). (Note: Zulfiqar Ali Bhutto claimed in his autobiography The Great Tragedy that if Operation Searchlight had not been completed on 25 March, the Awami League would have declared the province's independence after Zuhr on 26 March.)

In a radio address on the evening of 26 March, Yahya Khan declared the Awami League treasonous and banned the party. In addition to this, the government seized the bank accounts of the Awami League. Although Sheikh Mujibur Rahman and Kamal Hossain were imprisoned, most of the Awami League leaders managed to escape from the government. In such circumstances, the people of East Pakistan began to resist the Pakistan Army and this movement resulted in the liberation war of Bangladesh.

== Impact and legacy ==
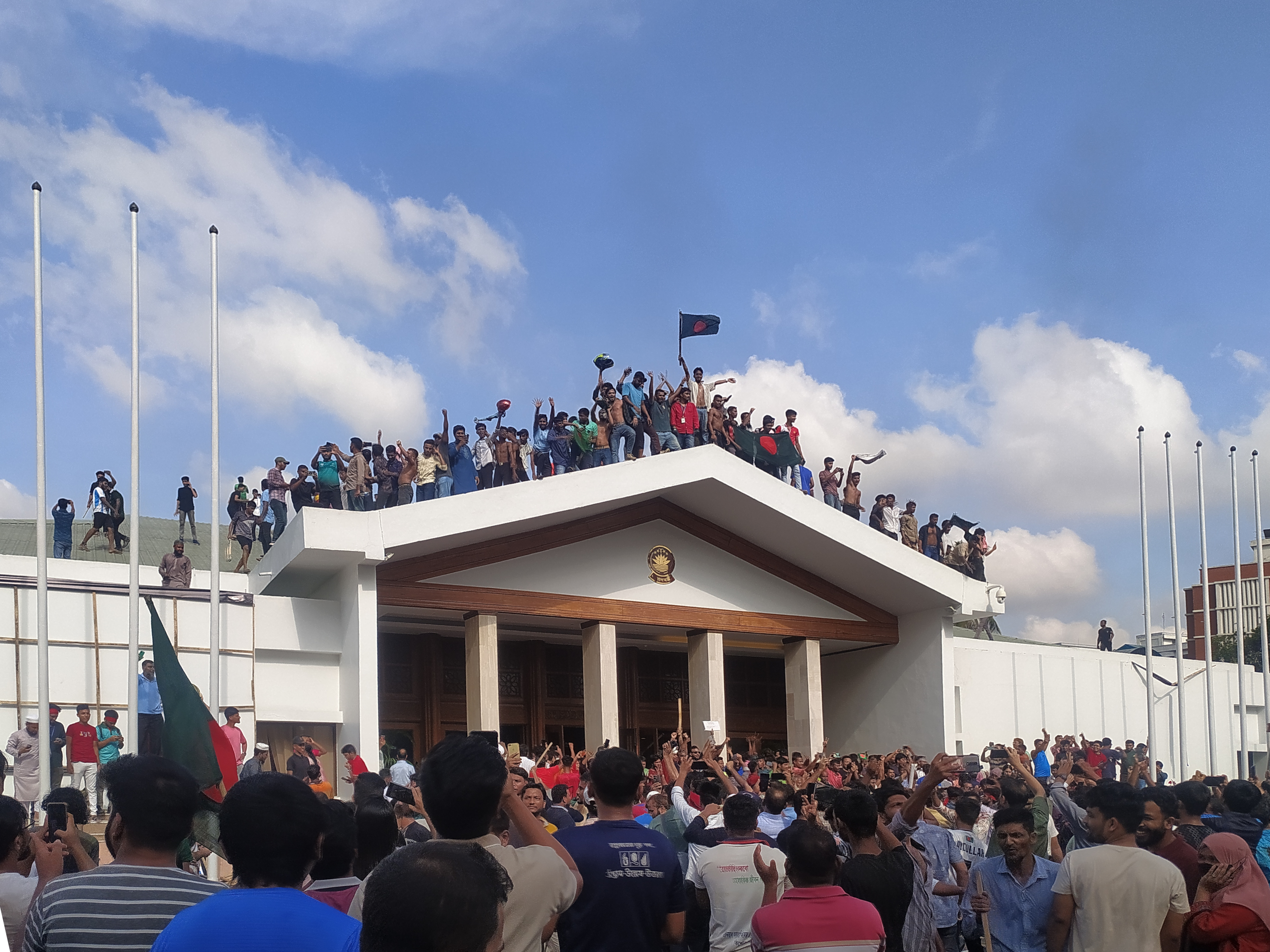
Non-cooperation movement in 2024, the reason of the fall of fifth Hasina ministry, was inspired from the movement in 1971

News of the non-cooperation movement was quickly spread throughout East Pakistan by newspapers and radio. Various published news stories about the Awami League, Sheikh Mujibur Rahman, and Yahya Khan in the newspapers of East Pakistan during the movement prove that the media was in favor of the movement at that time. Banks in East Pakistan also contributed to this movement. At that time, patriotic poems and songs written in leaflets in support of the non-cooperation movement were distributed in the branches of the banks.

According to Anthony Mascarenhas, this movement started on 1 March, which has no precedent in the history of Pakistan. The Pakistan Army did not expect any such movement to break out in East Pakistan.

Sharafat Hossain wrote in The Daily Ittefaq that although Sheikh Mujibur Rahman believed in armed struggle like Subhash Chandra Bose, he started a peaceful movement called non-cooperation as a political strategy. Although Mahatma Gandhi conducted his non-cooperation movement in an entirely peaceful India, Sheikh Mujibur Rahman withdrew from the peaceful movement out of necessity. National Awami Party leader Abdul Wali Khan said of the impact of the non-cooperation movement, "Gandhi would have been overwhelmed by this success".

Rehman Sobhan said about this movement that since the beginning of this movement, the existence of a central government in East Bengal was dissolved politically. When the government tried to regain control after 26 March, the people here saw it as foreign interference. According to him the movement was successful and Bangladesh regained its power to rule 213 years after the Battle of Plassey.

Political scientist Rounaq Jahan called the movement an unprecedented mass movement, which she attributed to Yahya Khan's postponement of a pre-scheduled meeting of the Pakistan Constituent Assembly. According to her, during this movement the people of East Pakistan started to consider themselves as citizens of a new state. She also felt that the people's participation in this movement and their desire to be independent created a general will for the independence of Bangladesh.

According to political scientist Zillur Rahman Khan, through this movement, Sheikh Mujibur Rahman established a separate de facto government in the region. The state of Bangladesh was created as a result of Sheikh Mujibur Rahman's contribution in rallying public support against Pakistan's military government.

Historian Muntassir Mamoon says, "The unarmed masses of East Pakistan chose total non-cooperation as a strategy of mass uprising as a means of liberation war".

It was the inspiration for Bangladesh's non-cooperation movement by the Students Against Discrimination movement against the government of Sheikh Hasina, daughter of Sheikh Mujibur Rahman, who was resigns on 5 August 2024.

== See also ==
- Arrest of Sheikh Mujibur Rahman
