= Md. Yunus Khan =

Bangladeshi politician

Kazim Uddin Ahmed

Member of Bangladesh Parliament
- In office 1991–1994
- Preceded by: ABM Ruhul Amin Howlader
- Succeeded by: Md. Abdur Rashid Khan

Personal details
- Died: 22 November 1994
- Party: Bangladesh Nationalist Party

Md. Yunus Khan was a Bangladesh Nationalist Party politician. He was a member of parliament for Barisal-6 and state minister for education.

== Career ==
Khan was a principal. He was elected to parliament from Barisal-6 as a Bangladesh Nationalist Party candidate in 1991. He was state minister for education in the first Khaleda ministry.

Khan died on 22 November 1994. He is buried on the grounds of Barisal Islamia College. In 2010, a road in Barisal was named Principal Yunus Khan Road in his memory.
