= Abdul Hafiz Mallik =

Bangladeshi politician

Member of the Bangladesh Parliament for Barisal-6
- In office 7 January 2024 – 6 August 2024
- Preceded by: Nasreen Jahan Ratna
- Succeeded by: Abul Hossain Khan

Personal details
- Born: 14 August 1951 (age 75)
- Party: Awami League

Abdul Hafiz Mallik (born 14 August 1951) is an Awami League politician and a former Jatiya Sangsad member representing the Barisal-6 constituency. He is a retired Major General of the Bangladesh Army.

== Career ==
Mallik was the engineer-in-chief of the Bangladesh Army from 14 August 1996 to 24 February 2001. He retired as a major general. He is the chairman of Best Life Insurance Limited.

Mallik was elected to parliament from Barisal-6 as an Awami League candidate on 7 January 2024. He is the chairman of Sheikh Fazilatunnessa Mujib Memorial KPJ Specialized Hospital. He is a member of Bangabandhu Memorial Trust.
