= Flag of Bangladesh =

National Flag of the People's Republic of Bangladesh
- "The Red–Green"
- Use: National flag
- Proportion: 3:5
- Adopted: 17 January 1972; 54 years ago
- Design: A green field defaced by a red disc slightly off centre to hoist (left as depicted).
- Designed by: Quamrul Hassan
- Civil ensign of Bangladesh
- Use: Civil ensign
- Design: A Red Ensign with the national flag of Bangladesh in the canton.
- Naval ensign of Bangladesh
- Use: Naval ensign
- Design: A White Ensign with the national flag of Bangladesh in the canton.
- Use: Air force ensign
- Proportion: 1:2
- Design: A field of air force blue with the national flag of Bangladesh in the canton and the Bangladesh Air Force roundel in the middle of the fly.

The national flag of Bangladesh, nicknamed the Lal–Sobuj, (Note: Bengali: লাল–সবুজ, romanized: Lal–Sôbuj, pronounced [ˈlalˌʃobudʒ]; lit. 'the Red–Green') was adopted officially on 17 January 1972. It consists of a red circle on top of a dark green field. The red circle is offset slightly toward the hoist so that it appears centred when the flag is flying. The civil ensign and naval ensign place it in the canton of a red or white field, respectively.

The flag is based on a similar flag used during the Bangladesh Liberation War of 1971, which had a yellow map of the country inside the red disc. In 1972, this map was removed from the flag. One reason given was the difficulty for rendering the map correctly on both sides of the flag.

While there are numerous interpretations, the most widely accepted interpretation says that the green of the flag symbolises the lush landscape of Bangladesh, and the red circle, reminiscent of the rising sun, represents the sacrifice made by the people during the Liberation War of 1971.

== Origin ==
Flag of Bangladesh used during the Liberation War

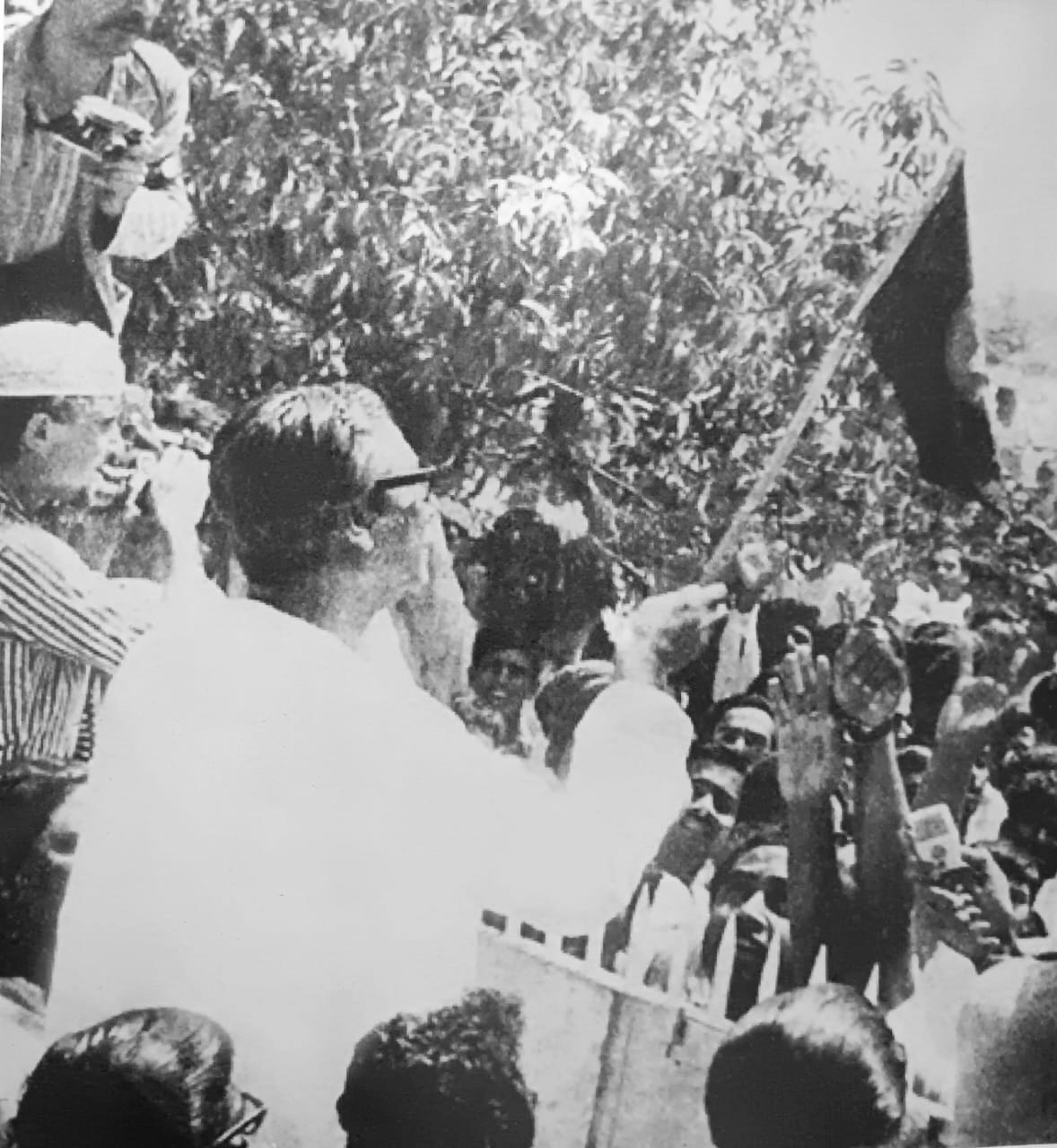
Official hoisting of the flag by Sheikh Mujibur Rahman at his residence in 32 Dhanmondi on 23 March 1971

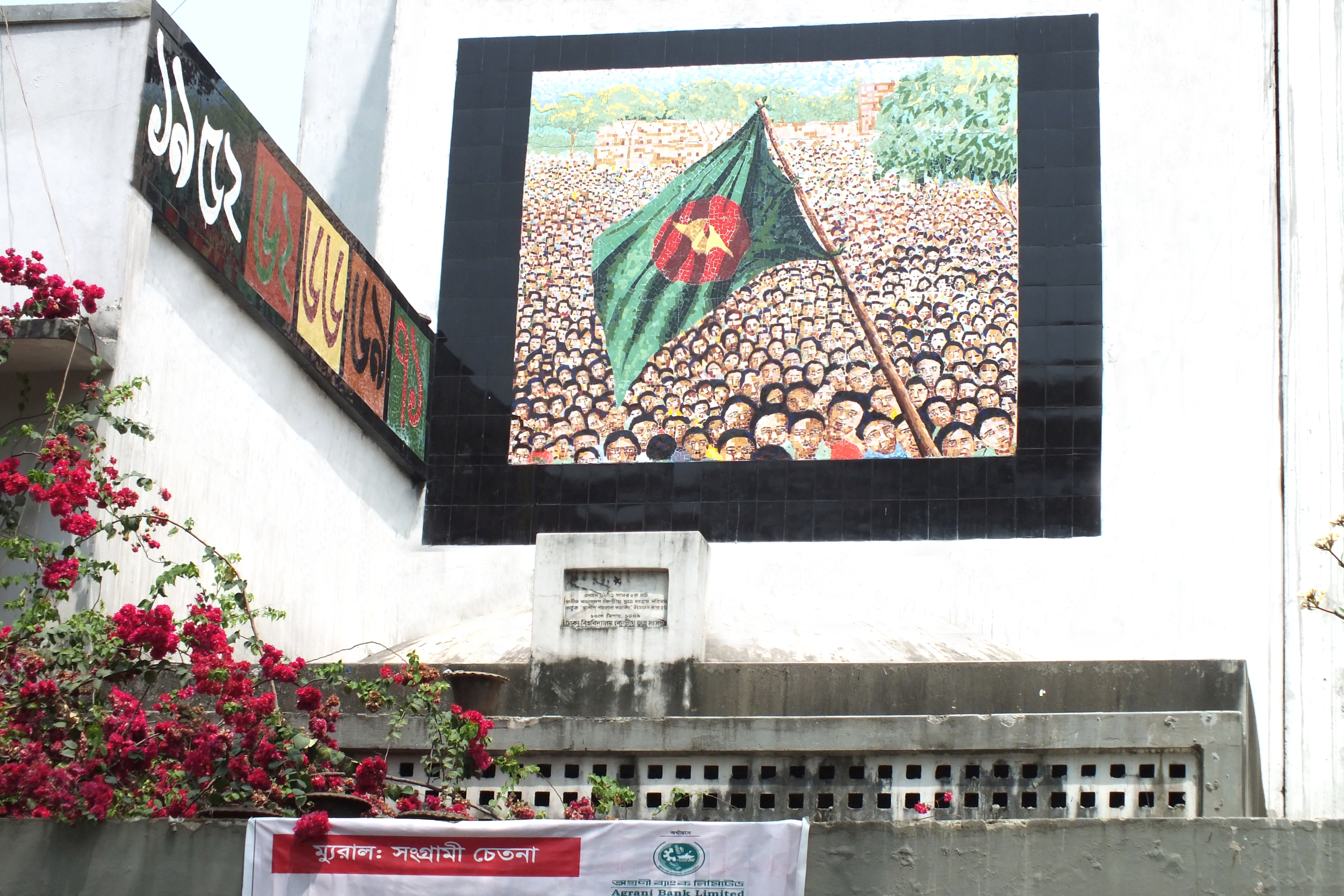
Dhaka University campus, where a flag representing Bangladesh for the first time was raised on 2 March 1971

The first version of the flag was designed and made by a group of student leaders and activists from the Swadheen Bangla Nucleus on 6 June 1970. The work took place in room 108 of Iqbal Hall (now Sergeant Zahurul Haq Hall) at Dhaka University. The students involved in the design included Kazi Aref Ahmed, ASM Abdur Rab, Shajahan Siraj, Manirul Islam (Marshal Moni), Swapan Kumar Choudhury, Serajul Alam Khan, Quamrul Alam Khan Khasru, Hasanul Haq Inu, and Yousuf Salahuddin Ahmed. The flag was crafted from cloth donated by Bazlur Rahman Lasker, the owner of Apollo Tailors, Dhaka New Market.

A map of East Pakistan (now Bangladesh) was first traced on a tracing paper from an atlas by Hasanul Haq Inu, Yousuf Salahuddin Ahmed and Enamul Haq, at Enamul's room (312) in Quaid-I Azam Hall (now Titumir Hall), EPUET (now BUET). Later, the map was painted in the red circle by Shib Narayan Das. On 2 March 1971, this initial version of the flag was hoisted in Bangladesh for the first time at Dhaka University, by student leader A. S. M. Abdur Rab, the then Vice President of Dhaka University Central Students' Union (DUCSU). The flag was conceived so as to exclude the star and crescent considered as symbols of West Pakistan (now Pakistan).

Another source states the first flag hoisted at Dhaka University on 2 March 1971 was stitched by Mini Quadir on 1 March 1971 upon requests from her cousin Monirul Haque, the president of Dhaka metropolitan Awami League. Using materials bought from Dhaka Sadarghat. On the next day upon another request by Monirul Haque a white cutout of the East Pakistan map was stitched onto the flag and later coloured golden using afsaan (mehendi) upon reconsideration. The flag was hoisted at Dhaka University.

On 23 March 1971, Sheikh Mujibur Rahman officially hoisted the flag for the first time at his house in 32 Dhanmondi. According to his pre-announced instructions, a general holiday is observed across the country on this day.

In April 1971, the flag was hoisted for the first time in foreign mission, when Deputy High Commissioner Hosen Ali along with other officials declared their alliance with the newly formed Mujibnagar Government.

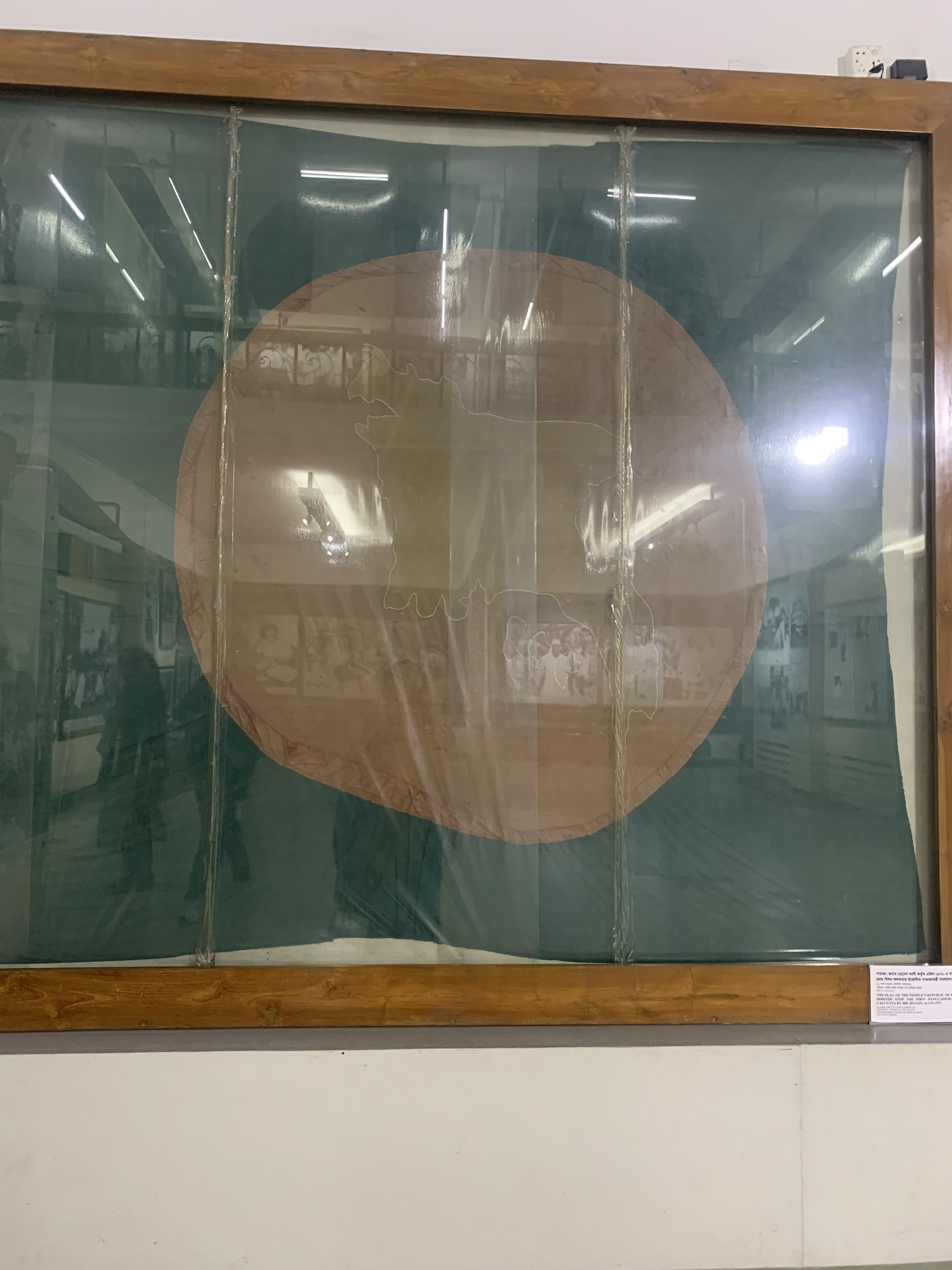
First flag to be hoisted on Kolkata Mission of Bangladesh

On 25 July 1971, Zakaria Pintoo, captain of the Shadhin Bangla Football Team became the first person to hoist the Bangladesh flag on foreign soil, before a match in Nadia district of the Indian state of West Bengal.

On 13 January 1972, the flag was modified. The map from the centre was removed, and the red disk moved towards the hoist so as to be visually centred when the flag is in flight on a mast.

== Symbolism ==
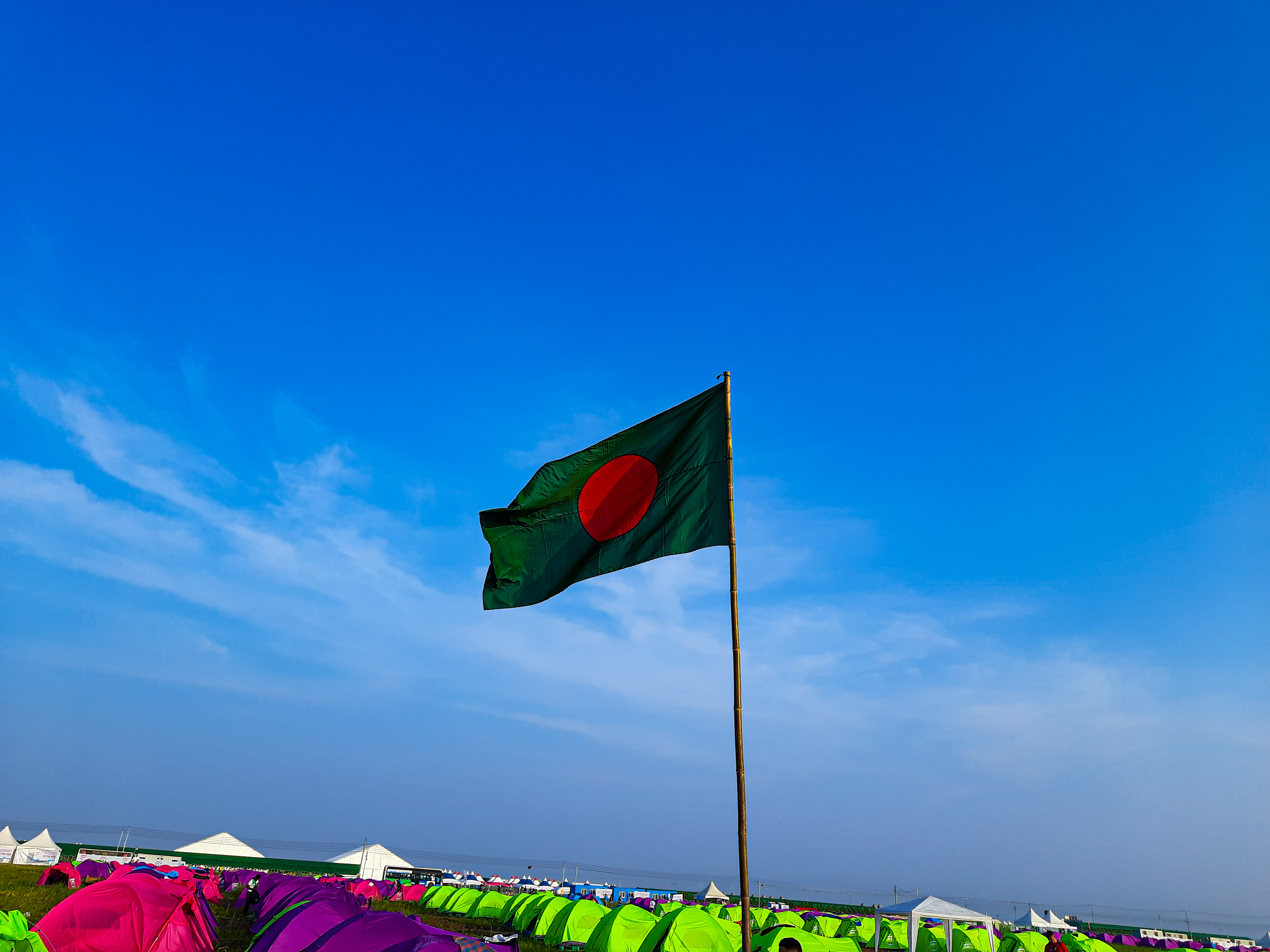
Flag of Bangladesh waving in the air

According to CIA World Factbook and official descriptions, the green used in the flag represents the lushness of the green landscape of the country and the red disk of the flag represents the blood the Bengalis shed during the Bangladesh Liberation War and the blood of those who died for the independence of Bangladesh. An alternative description says that the green background represents the youth power and progress, while the red disk represents the revolution and renaissance. The circularity of the red design indicates the rising sun, similar to the Japanese flag.

== Design ==
Construction guide

According to Bangladeshi government specifications, following is the specification of the national flag:

- The flag will be in bottle green and rectangular in size in the proportion of length to width of 10:6, with a red circle in near middle.
- The red circle will have a radius of one-fifth of the length of the flag. Its centre will be placed on the intersecting point of the perpendicular drawn from the nine-twentieth part of the length of the flag, and the horizontal line drawn through the middle of its width.
- The green base of the flag will be of Procion Brilliant Green H-2RS 50 parts per 1000. The red circular part will be of Procion Brilliant Orange H-2RS 60 parts per 1000.
- Depending on the size of the building the flag sizes will be 10 ft × 6 ft (3.0 m × 1.8 m); 5 ft × 3 ft (1.52 m × 0.91 m); 2 1/2 ft × 1 1/2 ft (760 mm × 460 mm). The size of the flag for cars is 12 1/2 in × 7 1/2 in (320 mm × 190 mm), and the size of the table flag for bilateral conferences is 10 in × 6 in (250 mm × 150 mm).

Colour Reference
Colour model	Green	Red
Procion (official specification)	Brilliant Green H-2RS 50 parts per 1000	Brilliant Orange H-2RS 60 parts per 1000
Pantone	342 C	485 C
RGB ^{a}	0,103,71	218,41,28
CMYK ^{b}	100-0-31-60	0-81-87-15
Hex ^{b}	#006747	#DA291C

^a Converted from Pantone color model per connect.pantone.com
^b Converted from RGB based on Inkscape colours value.

== Protocol ==
Flag used in military parades, with the Quranic verse inscribed: "Verily, Allah is capable of all things" (Quran 35:1)

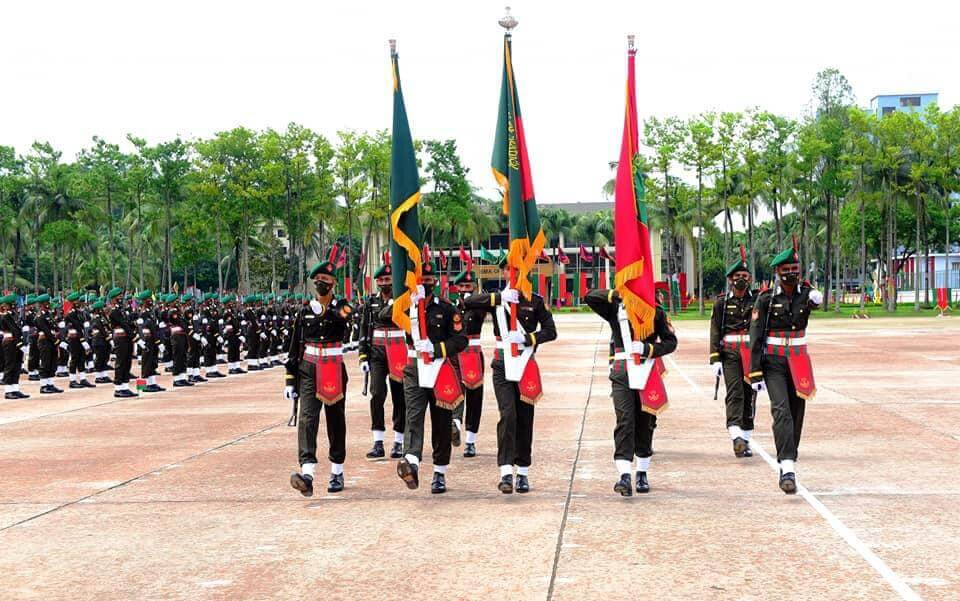
Colour guards contingent of Bangladesh Military Academy waving the ceremonial flag of Bangladesh.

The national flag of Bangladesh is flown on all working days on important government buildings and offices, e.g., the president house, legislative assembly buildings, etc. All ministries and the secretariat buildings of Bangladesh, offices of the high court, courts of district and session judges, offices of the commissioners of divisions, deputy commissioner/collectors, chairman, upazila parishad, central and district jails, police stations, primary, secondary and higher secondary level educational institutions and other buildings notified by the government from time to time. Ministers of state and persons accorded the status of a minister of state, deputy ministers and persons accorded the status of a deputy minister while on tour outside the capital within the country or abroad are entitled to fly the flag on their motor vehicles and vessels.

=== Official residences ===
The following persons must fly the flag on their official residence:

- The President of Bangladesh
- The Prime Minister of Bangladesh
- The Speaker of the Jatiya Sangsad
- The Deputy Speaker of the Jatiya Sangsad
- The Chief Whip of Bangladesh
- The Chief Justice of Bangladesh
- All Cabinet Ministers
- All Ministers of State
- The Leader of the Opposition in Jatiya Sangsad
- Heads of Bangladeshi Diplomatic or Consular Missions in foreign countries
- Chairmen of Chittagong hill tracts (district offices of Rangamati, Khagrachari and Bandarban)

=== Motor vehicles and vessels ===
The following persons are entitled to fly the flag on their motor vehicles and vessels:

- The President of Bangladesh
- The Prime Minister of Bangladesh
- The Speaker of the Jatiya Sangsad
- The Deputy Speaker of the Jatiya Sangsad
- The Chief Whip of Bangladesh
- The Chief Justice of Bangladesh
- All Cabinet Ministers
- All Ministers of State
- The Leader of the Opposition in Jatiya Sangsad
- Heads of Bangladeshi Diplomatic or Consular Missions in foreign countries

=== Display ===
The national flag of Bangladesh is flown on public and private buildings throughout Bangladesh and the office premises of Bangladeshi diplomatic missions and consular posts on the following days and occasions:

- Independence Day on 26 March.
- Victory Day on 16 December.
- Any other day notified by the Government of Bangladesh.

=== Half-mast ===
The national flag of Bangladesh is flown at half-mast on the National Martyrs Day on 21 February, and all other days notified by the Government of Bangladesh.

== World records ==
- On 16 December 2013, the 42nd Victory Day of Bangladesh, 27,117 people gathered at the National Parade Ground in Dhaka's Sher-e-Bangla Nagar and created a "human flag" which was recorded in Guinness Book of World Records as the world's largest human national flag. This feat was short-lived, however, as India topped the record on 7 December 2014 with 43,830 people participating to achieve the new world record for largest human national flag.
- In July 2021, Saimon Imran Hayder used 16,000 envelopes to create a 240m^{2} Bangladesh flag at the InterContinental Dhaka which was also a Guinness World Record attempt.
- In May 2024, in Memphis, Tennessee, Ashik Chowdhury jumped from 41,795 feet with a flag of Bangladesh. He was awarded the "Greatest Distance Freefall with a Banner or Flag" record by Guinness World Records.
- On 16 December 2025, the 54th Victory Day of Bangladesh, 54 paratroopers (signifying the 54th Victory Day), including Ashik Chowdhury, jumped from the attitude of approx. 12,000 feet (3,700 m) with Bangladeshi flags over the National Parade Ground in Sher-e-Bangla Nagar, Dhaka, which was recorded in Guinness Book of World Records as the world's largest flag-parachuting event.

== Historical flags ==
=== Pre-colonial states ===
Flag	Date	Use	Description
	1206–1352	Flag of the Delhi Sultanate according to the Catalan Atlas (1375)	A dark grey flag with a black strip left of centre.
	1576–1717	Flag of the Mughals (Bengal Subah)	Mughal Empire Alam flag that was primarily moss green.
	1717–1757	Flag of the Bengal Nawab	A white flag with three red barrels and a red sword.

=== British India and independence ===
Flag	Date	Use	Description
	1858–1947	The official state flag of the British Empire for use in India	The Flag of the United Kingdom.
	1885–1947	Flag of the Viceroy of India	The Union Jack with the insignia of the Order of the Star of India beneath the Imperial Crown of India.
	1880–1947	Flag of the British Raj: A civilian flag used to represent British India internationally.	A Red Ensign with the Union Flag at the canton, and the Star of India displayed in the fly.
	−1947	Flag of the Presidency of Fort William (Bengal Presidency, later Bengal Province)	A Blue Ensign with the Union Flag at the canton, and the Bengal Presidency Emblem displayed in the fly.
	1947–1971	Flag of Pakistan	Green flag with a white crescent and star on it, and a white strip to its left. See List of Pakistani flags for more.
	March – December 1971	Flag of Mukti Bahini (Liberation Forces)	A flag with a red background, a white disk and a hand holding a rifle- bayonet in the middle.
	1971–1972	Flag of Provisional Government of the People's Republic of Bangladesh, used after independence too. In recent years often used during protests as a legacy symbol of the original vision of the country during the liberation war.	A flag with a green background, a red disk and a yellow map of the country in the middle
	1971–1972	Reverse of flag of Provisional Government of the People's Republic of Bangladesh, used after independence too.	A flag with a green background, a red disk and a yellow map of the country in the middle
	1972–present	National flag of Bangladesh	A red disc on top of a green field, offset slightly toward the hoist.

== See also ==
- List of Bangladeshi flags
- National symbols of Bangladesh

Similar flags by pattern

- Flag of Japan
- Flag of Palau
- Flag of Dravida Nadu
