= Sirajul Haque Montu =

Bangladeshi politician

Member of Bangladesh Parliament
- In office 1979–1986
- Preceded by: Mokim Hossain Howlader
- Succeeded by: ABM Ruhul Amin Howlader

Personal details
- Party: Bangladesh Nationalist Party

Sirajul Haque Montu is a Bangladesh Nationalist Party politician and a former member of parliament for Barisal-6.

== Career ==
Montu was elected to parliament from Barisal-6 as a Bangladesh Nationalist Party candidate in 1979. He was minister of state for textiles. Around 1980, he had a stadium constructed in Muladi.
