= Barisal-6 =

Constituency of Bangladesh's Jatiya Sangsad

Coordinates: 22.54°N 90.34°E

- Constituency for the Jatiya Sangsad
- District: Barisal District
- Division: Barisal Division
- Electorate: 315,597 (2026)

Current constituency
- Created: 1973
- Parliamentary Party: Bangladesh Nationalist Party
- Member of Parliament: Abul Hossain Khan
- ← 123 Barisal-5 125 Jhalokati-1 →

Barisal-6 is a constituency represented in the Jatiya Sangsad (National Parliament) of Bangladesh. Abul Hossain Khan is the incumbent member of Parliament from this constituency.

== Boundaries ==
The constituency encompasses Bakerganj Upazila.

== History ==
The constituency was created for the first general elections in newly independent Bangladesh, held in 1973.

== Members of Parliament ==
Election	Member	Party
1973	Mokim Hossain Howlader	Bangladesh Awami League
1979	Sirajul Haque Montu	Bangladesh Nationalist Party
1986	ABM Ruhul Amin Howlader	Jatiya Party (Ershad)
1991	Md. Yunus Khan	Bangladesh Nationalist Party
1995 by-election	Md. Abdur Rashid Khan	Bangladesh Nationalist Party
Feb 1996	Anwar Hossain Chowdhury	Bangladesh Nationalist Party
Jun 1996	Syed Masud Reza	Bangladesh Awami League
2001	Abul Hossain Khan	Bangladesh Nationalist Party
2008	ABM Ruhul Amin Howlader	Jatiya Party (Ershad)
2014	Nasreen Jahan Ratna	Jatiya Party (Ershad)
2024	Abdul Hafiz Mallik	Bangladesh Awami League
2026	Abul Hossain Khan	Bangladesh Nationalist Party

== Elections ==
=== Elections in the 2020s ===
General Election 2026: Barisal-6
Party	Candidate	Votes	%	±%
BNP	Abul Hossain Khan	82,217	48.04	+12.34
Jamaat	Md. Mahmudunnabi	55,988	33.71	+31.71
IAB	Syed Faizul Karim	29,146	17.03	+12.03
Majority		26,229	15.36	−7.94
Turnout		168,079	54.23	−28.37
Registered electors		315,597		
BNP gain from AL				

=== Elections in the 2010s ===
Nasreen Jahan Ratna, of the Jatiya Party (Ershad), was elected unopposed in the 2014 general election after opposition parties withdrew their candidacies in a boycott of the election.

=== Elections in the 2000s ===
General Election 2008: Barisal-6
Party	Candidate	Votes	%	±%
JP(E)	ABM Ruhul Amin Howlader	89,237	58.9	N/A
BNP	Abul Hossain Khan	54,005	35.7	−4.4
IAB	Rafikul Islam	7,505	5.0	N/A
Independent	Humayun Kabir Mollah	286	0.2	N/A
BTF	AHM Saiful Islam Saifee	278	0.2	N/A
BDB	Md. Abdur Rashid Khan	172	0.1	N/A
Majority		35,232	23.3	−13.6
Turnout		151,483	82.6	+22.5
JP(E) gain from BNP				

General Election 2001: Barisal-6
Party	Candidate	Votes	%	±%
BNP	Abul Hossain Khan	54,318	40.1	+6.2
AL	Syed Masud Reza	41,171	30.4	−11.3
IJOF	ABM Ruhul Amin Hawlader	20,120	14.9	N/A
Independent	Samsul Alam Chunnu	19,664	14.5	N/A
Bangladesh Progressive Party	Pushpan Nahar	132	0.1	N/A
Jatiya Party (M)	Shamsul Alam Salim	51	0.0	N/A
Majority		13,147	9.7	+1.9
Turnout		135,456	60.1	−8.1
BNP gain from AL				

=== Elections in the 1990s ===
General Election June 1996: Barisal-6
Party	Candidate	Votes	%	±%
AL	Syed Masud Reza	41,864	41.6	
BNP	Md. Abdur Rashid Khan	34,038	33.9	
JP(E)	ABM Ruhul Amin Hawlader	15,661	15.6	
IOJ	Abdul Matin Miah	6,341	6.3	
Jamaat	Md. Mahmudunnabi Talukdar	2,010	2.0	
JSD	Md. Mohsin Hawladar	278	0.3	
Islamic Sashantantrik Andolan	Barek Mian	233	0.2	
Independent	Siddque Ahmed Noman	94	0.1	
Majority		7,826	7.8	
Turnout		100,519	68.2	
AL gain from BNP				

Md. Abdur Rashid Khan of the BNP was elected in a January 1995 by-election.

General Election 1991: Barisal-6
Party	Candidate	Votes	%	±%
BNP	Md. Yunus Khan	42,361	40.8	
NAP (Muzaffar)	Majibur Rahman Talukder	27,189	26.2	
JP(E)	ABM Ruhul Amin Howlader	19,486	18.8	
IOJ	Abdul Matin Miah	6,898	6.6	
Independent	Moazzem Hossain Chowdhury	2,879	2.8	
Jamaat	Md. Abul Kalam Azad	2,215	2.1	
JSD	Abul Hossain Khan	1,218	1.2	
Independent	Mohiuddin Ahmed	625	0.6	
Zaker Party	Md. Alhaz Shamsul Haq	592	0.6	
BAKSAL	Shahidul Islam Khan	375	0.4	
Majority		15,172	14.6	
Turnout		103,838	45.8	
BNP gain from JP(E)				
