= Anwar Hossain Chowdhury =

Bangladeshi politician

- আনোয়ার হোসেন চৌধুরী

Member of Parliament for Barisal-6
- In office 15 February 1996 – 12 June 1996
- Preceded by: Md. Abdur Rashid Khan
- Succeeded by: Syed Masud Reza

Personal details
- Born: Barisal District
- Party: Bangladesh Nationalist Party

Military service
- Allegiance: Bangladesh; Pakistan (before 1972)
- Branch/service: Bangladesh Army; Pakistan Army
- Years of service: 1966–1994
- Rank: Brigadier General
- Unit: Corps of Engineers
- Commands: Commandant of Engineers Centre and School of Military Engineering; Station Commander, Bogra

Anwar Hossain Chowdhury is a retired brigadier general of the Bangladesh Army, a politician of the Bangladesh Nationalist Party, and a former member of parliament for the Barisal-6 constituency.

== Early life ==
Chowdhury was born in Barisal District.

== Career ==
Chowdhury is a retired brigadier general of the Bangladesh Army. He was elected a member of parliament for the Barisal-6 constituency as a candidate of the Bangladesh Nationalist Party in the sixth parliamentary election on 15 February 1996.
