= Md. Abdur Rashid Khan =

Bangladeshi politician

Member of Bangladesh Parliament
- In office 1995–1996
- Preceded by: Md. Yunus Khan
- Succeeded by: Anwar Hossain Chowdhury

Personal details
- Party: Bangladesh Nationalist Party

Md. Abdur Rashid Khan (Bengali: আব্দুর রশিদ খান) is a Bangladesh Nationalist Party politician and a former member of parliament for Barisal-6.

== Career ==
Khan was elected to parliament from Barisal-6 as a Bangladesh Nationalist Party candidate in the 1995 by-election following the death of the incumbent member of parliament, Md. Yunus Khan.
