= Mokim Hossain Howlader =

Bangladeshi politician

Member of Bangladesh Parliament
- In office 1973–1979
- Succeeded by: Sirajul Haque Montu

Personal details
- Party: Bangladesh Awami League

Mokim Hossain Howlader is a Bangladesh Awami League politician and a former member of parliament for Barisal-6.

== Career ==
Howlader was elected to parliament from Barisal-6 as a Bangladesh Awami League candidate in 1973.

== Death ==
Howlader was shot dead in 1973.
