= East Pakistan Students' League =

Students organization in Pakistan (1948–1972)

East Pakistan Students' League পূর্ব পাকিস্তান ছাত্রলীগ مشرقی پاکستان سٹوڈنٹس لیگ
- Leader: Sheikh Mujibur Rahman
- President: Nur-e-Alam Siddique
- Secretary General: Shajahan Siraj
- Founded: 4 January 1948
- Split from: All India Muslim Students Federation
- Preceded by: East Pakistan Muslim Students' League (1948–1953)
- Dissolved: 21 July 1972
- Succeeded by: Bangladesh Chhatra League; Bangladesh Chhatra League (Jatiya Samajtantrik Dal)
- Headquarters: 42 Balaka Building, Dacca, East Pakistan
- Ideology: Socialism; Bengali nationalism
- Colours: Green
- Mother party: East Pakistan Awami League
- National affiliation: All-Pakistan Awami League

The East Pakistan Students' League (Bengali: পূর্ব পাকিস্তান ছাত্রলীগ, Urdu: مشرقی پاکستان سٹوڈنٹس لیگ) was founded in 1948 following the independence of Pakistan to support the political activities and campaigns of the Muslim League in electoral politics. Sheikh Mujibur Rahman was the founder of this organisation.

== History ==
On 4 January 1948, a general discussion meeting was held at the auditorium of Fazlul Huq Muslim Hall, University of Dhaka. In the meeting, everyone agreed on the formation of a student organization. From that meeting, the East Pakistan Muslim Student's League was established. In 1949, a proposal was made to remove the word "Muslim" from the organization's name, but due to the intense activities of the Bengali language movement, it was not possible. After the Language Movement, in the 1953 council meeting, the proposal to remove the word "Muslim" from the name was approved and implemented.

== Factions ==
It is said that there were two possible major factions:

- Bengali nationalist faction, who were supporters of confederation-like extended autonomy of East Pakistan.
- Socialist faction, who were supporters of the secession of East Pakistan and creation of a socialist Bengal state.

== Presidents and General-secretaries ==
	Year	Presidents	Later role/Affiliation	General secretaries	Later role/Affiliation
1	1947-1947	Naimuddin Ahmed	Unknown	Adnan Ali Khadem	Unknown
2	1947-1950	Dabirul Islam	MLA, KSP	Khaleque Nawaz Khan	MLA, KSP
3	1950-52	Khaleque Nawaz Khan	MLA, KSP	Kamruzzaman	Presidium Member, Awami League
4	1952-53	Kamruzzaman	Presidium Member, Awami League	MA Wadud	Journalist, The Daily Ittefaq
5	1953-57	Abdul Momin Talukdar	Deputy Minister, LGRD and Cooperative	M A Awal	Convenor, Awami League
6	1957-60	Rafiq Ullah Choudhury	Prime Minister's Secretary	Shah Moazzem Hossain (In-charge, after Azhar Ali resigned)	Vice President, BNP
7	1960-63	Shah Moazzem Hossain	Vice President, BNP	Sheikh Fazlul Haque Mani	Executive Committee member, BAKSAL
8	1963-65	KM Obaidur Rahman	General Secretary, BNP	Serajul Alam Khan	Founder, Jatiya Samajtantrik Dal
9	1965-67	Syed Mazharul Haque Baki	Unknown	Abdur Razzaq	Presidium member, Awami League
10	1967-68	Ferdous Ahmed Qureshi	Joint Secretary, BNP & Founder PDP	Abdur Razzaq	Presidium member, Awami League
11	1968-69	Abdur Rauf	Expelled, MP from Awami League	Khaled Mohammad Ali	Unknown
12	1969-70	Tofail Ahmed	Minister, MP and Presidium Member from Awami League	A. S. M. Abdur Rab	President, Jatiya Samajtantrik Dal-JSD
13	1970-72	Nur-e-Alam Siddiqui (Expelled in 1972)	Businessman	Shajahan Siraj (Expelled in 1972)	Minister & MP from BNP
