= Abul Hossain Khan =

Bangladeshi politician

Member of Bangladesh Parliament
- Incumbent
- Assumed office 2026
- Preceded by: Abdul Hafiz Mallik
- Constituency: Barisal-6

Personal details
- Born: 10 April Bakerganj
- Party: Bangladesh Nationalist Party

Abul Hossain Khan is a Bangladesh Nationalist Party politician and current member of parliament for Barisal-6. He is a member of national executive committee BNP. And convener of Barishal zila BNP. In academic life,he was a student of The University of Dhaka where the initial part of his political life was started as an emerging student leader.

== Career ==
Khan was elected to parliament from Barisal-6 as a Bangladesh Nationalist Party candidate in 2001.

As of 2018, he is president of the Bakerganj Upazila unit of the BNP.
