= Nasreen Jahan Ratna =

Bangladeshi politician

Member of Parliament for Barisal-6
- In office 5 January 2014 – 2019
- Preceded by: ABM Ruhul Amin Howlader

Member of Parliament for Reserved Women's Seat-42
- In office 2009–2014
- Succeeded by: Nurjahan Begum

Personal details
- Born: 8 September 1963 (age 62) Barisal, East Pakistan, Pakistan
- Party: Jatiya Party (Ershad)
- Spouse: ABM Ruhul Amin Howlader

Nasreen Jahan Ratna (born 8 August 1963) is a Bangladesh Jaitya Party politician and former Member of Bangladesh Parliament from Barisal-6.

== Biography ==
Ratna was educated at home and did not receive formal education. She is from Barisal City. She was elected chairperson of Bakerganj municipality in May 2004. Her nomination from Barisal-6 was cancelled by the Bangladesh Election Commission for the elections scheduled to take place in 2006. She appealed the decision of the commission on 20 December 2006. Hossain Mohammad Ershad, the chairman of the Jatiya Party, selected her as the Jatiya Party candidate for the general election. In 2009, she was selected to parliament from one of forty-five reserved seats for women candidates as a member of the Jatiya Party. She was elected to parliament in 2014 from Barisal-6. She was also a member of the Parliamentary Standing Committee on Ministry of Women and Children Affairs.

== Controversy ==
Ratna waded into controversy after she opened a bazaar named after Sadek Ali Howlader in Badarganj municipality on 25 August 2009. Sadek Ali Howlader was a member of the pro-Pakistani Rajakar militia and allegedly committed war crimes during the Bangladesh Liberation War. He allegedly committed acts of violence against the Hindu community, and the market was built upon land grabbed from Hindu people.

== Personal life ==
Ratna is married to ABM Ruhul Amin Howlader. Her husband is the co-chairman of the Jatiya Party and a member of parliament from the Jatiya Party.
