= A. B. M. Ruhul Amin Howlader =

Bangladeshi politician and Member of Parliament

- এ বি এম রুহুল আমিন হাওলাদার
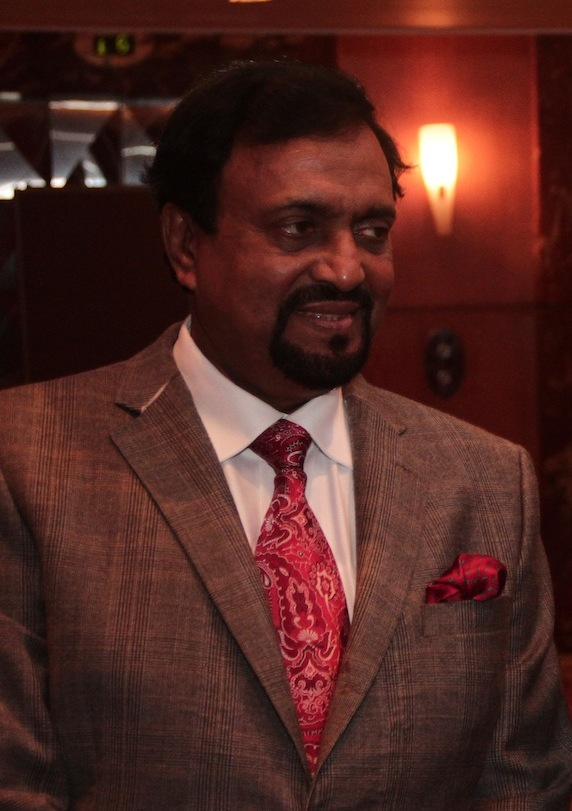
- Howlader in 2012

Member of the Bangladesh Parliament for Patuakhali-1
- In office 10 January 2024 – 6 August 2024
- Preceded by: Afzal Hossain
- In office 5 January 2014 – 7 January 2019
- Preceded by: Shahjahan Mia
- Succeeded by: Shahjahan Mia

Member of the Bangladesh Parliament for Barisal-6
- In office 6 January 2009 – 5 January 2014
- Preceded by: Abul Hossain Khan
- Succeeded by: Nasreen Jahan Ratna

Personal details
- Born: 2 March 1953 (age 73)
- Party: Jatiya Party
- Spouse: Nasreen Jahan Ratna

A. B. M. Ruhul Amin Howlader (born 2 March 1953) is a Bangladeshi politician and a former Jatiya Party member of parliament. He represented the Barisal-6 constituency from 2009 to 2014. After that he twice represented Patuakhali-1. From 2020 to 2025, he was co-chairman of the Jatiya Party. On 7 July 2025, he was expelled from the party for breaking party rules.

== Early life ==
Howlader was born on 2 March 1953. He has a B.A. degree.

== Career ==
Howlader was appointed the general secretary of the Jatiya Party in 2001. He was elected to parliament in 2008 from Barisal-6 as a Jatiya Party candidate. On 10 April 2013, he was removed as general secretary following a power struggle in the party. He again was elected to parliament in 2014 from Patuakhali-1. On 19 January 2016, he was reinstated as secretary general.

Howlader was secretary general of the Jatiya Party until 3 December 2018, when he was replaced by Mashiur Rahaman Ranga. The Bangladesh Election Commission declared his candidacy from Patuakhali-1 for the 2018 Bangladesh general election void due to his default on a loan.

Howlader was elected to the Patuakhali-1 seat again in 2024.
