= Sheikh Fazlul Haque Mani =

Bangladeshi politician (1939–1975)

Sheikh Fazlul Haque Moni
- শেখ ফজলুল হক মনি

Personal details
- Born: 4 December 1939 Tungipara, Bengal, British India
- Died: 15 August 1975 (aged 35) Dacca, Bangladesh
- Cause of death: Assassination
- Party: Bangladesh Awami Jubo League
- Spouse: Begum Arzu Moni Serniabat
- Children: 2, including Taposh
- Relatives: Sheikh family of Tungipara Mukti Bahini
- Profession: Politician, writer, journalist
- Awards: Independence Award

Military service
- Allegiance: Bangladesh
- Unit: Mujib Bahini
- Battles/wars: Bangladesh Liberation War

Sheikh Fazlul Haque Moni (4 December 1939 – 15 August 1975) was a Bangladeshi politician. He was one of the nephews of Sheikh Mujibur Rahman, the founding father of Bangladesh. He was one of the founders of Mujib Bahini Bangladesh Liberation Force - BLF one of the major guerrilla forces of the Bangladesh Liberation War, and also the founder of Bangladesh Awami Jubo League, the youth wing of Bangladesh Awami League.

== Early life ==
Moni was born on 4 December 1939 to the Sheikh family of Tungipara in Gopalganj, Faridpur district, Bengal Presidency. He was the son of Sheikh Nurul Haque and Sheikh Asia Begum. The family was descended from Sheikh Abdul Awal Dervish, a Sufi who arrived in the port of Chittagong centuries prior, likely from Eastern Iran. Moni's great-grandfather Qudratullah Sheikh was the Zamindar of Faridpur District during the British Era of the Indian Subcontinent. Qudratullah was involved in a scuffle with an English indigo planter known as Mr. Ryan, in which he won, details of which are spread in Faridpur folk memory. His mother, Sheikh Asia Begum, was a sister of Sheikh Mujibur Rahman. Moni studied at Nabakumar Institution in Dhaka. Later, he studied at Jagannath College (HSC, 1958) and BM College (BA, 1960).

== Career ==
Mani was the founding chairman of the Jubo League. Later he served as general secretary of the then East Pakistan Chhatra League from 1960 to 1964. His contribution to spearhead the historic student movement against autocratic ruler Ayub Khan's military regime produced an immense effect. He played a pivotal role during the six-point movement in 1966. He was a student leader and general secretary of the Students' League. In the first week of April 1971, he, along with three other Awami League leaders, escaped to Kolkata. The leaders were Tofael Ahmed, Abdur Razzak, and Shirazul Alam Khan. They organized the Mukti Bahini in India to liberate Bangladesh. Mani and P. N. Banerji, then joint director of Research and Analysis Wing (east), set up the Mujib Bahini as a counterbalance to former East Pakistan army officers in the Mukti Bahini. Members of the Mujib Bahini would go on to form the Jatiya Rakkhi Bahini. He took part in the war of liberation in 1971 as the commander, without any military training, of the Bangladesh Liberation Front. He initially supported the formation of a revolutionary council instead of an interim government, which was against the wishes of Tajuddin Ahmed. He eventually had to give up on that, and the interim government was formed. He was considered part of the inner circle of President Mujibur and was seen as loyal to Mujibur. This was the reason given for his assassination. Moni was the author of several novels, one of which was later made into a film, Obanchita.

Moni took over ownership and the editorship of the daily newspaper Dainik Banglar Bani early in its existence.

== Death ==
Moni, along with his wife Arzu Moni, was killed during the assassination of Sheikh Mujibur Rahman in a military coup on 15 August 1975. He lived two kilometers away from Mujib in Dhanmondi. The attack on his house was witnessed by Mahfuz Anam, who is the editor and publisher of The Daily Star, whose house was on the opposite side of the lake from Moni's house. His two sons - Fazle Noor Taposh, former mayor of Dhaka South City Corporation, and Sheikh Fazle Shams Parash, an academic by profession - survived the attack, as they were hiding under a bed. His wife, who was thought to be pregnant, was also killed.

Taposh was three years and eight months old then, while Parash was around five years. Taposh was elected to the Jatiya Sangsad (National Parliament) in the 2008 Bangladeshi general election from the Dhaka-12 constituency. He was elected mayor of DSCC in the 2020 Dhaka South City Corporation election. Parash currently holds the position of chairman of the Jubo League.

== Legacy ==
The Shahid Sheikh Moni Memorial International Chess Tournament, which was held in Dhaka, Bangladesh, in 2015, was named in his memory. An auditorium in Gopalganj, Bangladesh, was named after him.

=== Criticism ===
Mani was given lucrative positions in the government formed by Sheikh Mujib. When private trade with India was banned due to slow inflation, Mani actively engaged in it with Mujib's blessings. This was seen as an attempt by Mujib to form a dynasty.

Mani was one of the core members of BLF. However, his role in the liberation war is a matter of controversy. He opposed Tajuddin Ahmad, who was then the prime minister and main organiser of Mujibnagar Government, throughout the Liberation War. According to Sheikh Shahidul Islam, he ployed with Khondaker Mostaq Ahmad to remove Tajuddin Ahmad from the position of prime minister. BLF's role in the Liberation War is also controversial, as they allegedly attacked different factions of guerrilla freedom fighters and looted their firearms.
