= Syed Masud Reza =

Bangladeshi politician

Member of Bangladesh Parliament

Personal details
- Political party: Bangladesh Awami League

Syed Masud Reza was a Bangladesh Awami League politician and a member of parliament for Barisal-6.

== Career ==
Reza was elected to parliament from Barisal-6 as a Bangladesh Awami League candidate in 1996.

== Death ==
Reza died in 2013. His daughter, Ambareen Reza, is a businesswoman and founding director of Food Panda Bangladesh.
