= Swadhin Bangla Biplobi Parishad =

Armed underground student political group in Bangladesh

- স্বাধীন বাংলা বিপ্লবী পরিষদ
- Abbreviation: SBBP
- Nickname: Nucleus
- Formation: 1962
- Founder: Serajul Alam Khan
- Founded at: University of Dhaka
- Organizer: Serajul Alam Khan; Abdur Razzaq; Kazi Aref Ahmed
- Affiliations: Mujib Bahini

The Swadhin Bangla Biplobi Parishad (Bengali: স্বাধীন বাংলা বিপ্লবী পরিষদ, lit. 'Free Bengal Revolutionary Council'), also known as Nucleus, was an armed secessionist group secretly organized in 1961 by Serajul Alam Khan.

Nucleus acted as a catalyst for an armed secessionist movement against the Government of Pakistan to separate East Pakistan from Pakistan.

== History ==
Swadhin Bangla Biplobi Parishad was formed secretly at Iqbal Hall of the University of Dhaka by Serajul Alam Khan, Abdur Razzaq, and Kazi Aref Ahmed. Sheikh Mujibur Rahman was reportedly aware of the group’s formation.

Nucleus political arm was the Bangladesh Liberation Force. From 1962, it planned and organized mass movements through the historic 6-point and 11-point programs. Training of Dhaka University students for the armed revolt against Pakistan started on the university's gymnasium field on 1 March as the university's halls were closed to students since then.

Earlier, Sheikh Mujibur Rahman had founded another student group in the same university's Fazlul Huq Hall on 4 January 1948 named the East Pakistan Chhatra League, renamed the Bangladesh Chhatra League upon the Bangladesh Liberation War and Bangladesh's subsequent independence. The students of this league were recruited into the Mukti Bahini, Sheikh Mujibur Rahman's armed guerrilla force and the military arm of his political party the Bangladesh Awami League trained by India's foreign intelligence organization the Research and Analysis Wing to wage the secession against Pakistan.

The BLF first made the flag of Bangladesh and hoisted it on 2 March 1971, when the Awami League, led by Sheikh Mujibur Rahman, made a call for a general strike to agitate for independence. The Pakistani military on 25 March launched Operation Searchlight. Ziaur Rahman declared Bangladesh's independence the following day. Subsequently, under Sheikh Mujibur Rahman's directive, the BLF high command was reconstituted with Serajul Alam Khan, Sheikh Fazlul Huq Moni, Abdur Razzaq and Tofail Ahmed. This revamped Bangladesh Liberation Force was renamed Mujib Bahini in the war.

The general strike, pogroms and the resulting war followed on the heels of the Agartala Conspiracy, at the time deemed a politically motivated accusation by the Pakistani state against Bengali leaders but confirmed in 2011 to be factually true by the Bangladeshi Parliament's Deputy Speaker and one of the Agartala conspirators Shawkat Ali. By the start of the war, other countries hostile to Pakistan seized upon the opportunity and gave material assistance to this student movement (that had by now morphed into an armed guerrilla revolt) to bring about Pakistan's disintegration, with a potentially friendly nation's independence being a favorable by-product. When the war ended the Indian Army destroyed all files and records of its activities regarding East Pakistan before as well as during the war, though in 2015 the Indian Prime Minister Narendra Modi would explain India's role in the war in an address at Dhaka University.

The central role of students in the armed secessionist rebellion aided by India was the main reason why the Razakars killed Bengali students and intellectuals on Dhaka University grounds on 25 March. At the start of Operation Searchlight and committed another massacre of Bengali intellectuals on 14 December, two days before Pakistan's defeat and surrender and Bangladesh's resulting independence. Both massacres were committed on the grounds that Dhaka University was a hotbed of guerrilla activity and served as an arms dump and a nerve center of military operations run by the university's students and faculty.

== Activities in East Pakistan ==
The Nucleus operated clandestinely within the Chhatra League, the Awami League’s student organization. Its members followed a need-to-know approach to recruitment. Mahfuzur Rahman, who said he belonged to the group, described being recruited in Chittagong under this arrangement. By 1969, Nucleus committees had reportedly been established in about 200 police-station areas across the country. New members reportedly received a leaflet outlining the group’s objectives and guerrilla-warfare tactics. Serajul Alam Khan provided political-theory instruction to recruits.

=== Specific Events and Actions ===
Nucleus principal organizers were Serajul Alam Khan, Abdur Razzaq, and Kazi Aref Ahmed. They circulated leaflets promoting independence and introducing basic guerrilla tactics, while keeping the organization’s activities hidden from martial law authorities. By 1964, the Nucleus had developed a more established structure. It expanded its underground recruitment and distributed bulletins advocating revolutionary ideas, helping reinforce calls for greater regional autonomy. This activity continued as Mujibur Rahman presented the Six-Point program at an opposition conference in Lahore on February 5, 1966. The program called for greater fiscal and administrative independence for East Pakistan.

Nucleus operating through Chhatra League networks, discreetly supported efforts to build backing for the Six Points. Its members also coordinated responses to Mujib’s arrests in 1966 and to the June 7 hartal calling for his release, while taking care not to reveal the group’s existence. Their activities formed part of the wider campaign against Ayub Khan and reflected concerns about East Pakistan economic position, which had intensified after the 1965 Indo-Pak War.

During the 1969 uprising against Ayub Khan, the Nucleuscontinued to operate largely behind the scenes. After the Central Students Action Council was formed on January 5 and demanded the withdrawal of the Agartala Conspiracy Case, the group expanded its committees to about 200 police stations across the country. It relied on discreet local recruitment and strict need-to-know practices.

== Controversies ==
=== Foreign influence and support ===
Shortly after the Swadhin Bangla Biplobi Parishad was established in 1962, Sheikh Mujibur Rahman reportedly sought India’s help in arranging military training for its members. In February, he is said to have met with senior Indian intelligence officials to discuss logistical and operational support.

== See also ==
- Mitrokhin Archive
