= Kazi Aref Ahmed =

Bangladeshi politician and freedom fighter

Member of Parliament

Personal details
- Born: 1948
- Died: 16 February 1999 (aged 50–51) Kalidaspur, Daulatpur Upazila, Kushtia District
- Party: Jatiya Samajtantrik Dal

Kazi Aref Ahmed (Bengali: কাজী আরেফ আহমেদ) was the President of Jatiya Samajtantrik Dal and one of the organizers of Bangladesh Liberation war.

== Early life ==
Ahmed was born in 1942.

== Career ==
Ahmed was a founding member of the Swadhin Bangla Biplobi Parishad along with ASM Abdur Rob, Serajul Alam Khan, and Shahjahan Siraj in the 1960s. They wanted Bangladesh to become an independent country and joined Awami League to work towards that goal. He served as the president of Dhaka unit of Chatra league.

On 2 March 1971, he along with other student leaders raised the flag of independent Bangladesh in Dhaka University. He fought in the Bangladesh Liberation War and served as a commander.

Ahmed was one of the founders and organizers of Nirmul Committee which demanded a war crimes tribunal for war crimes committed during Bangladesh Liberation War. He served as the President of Jatiya Samajtantrik Dal.

== Death ==
Ahmed was attending a rally of Jatiya Samajtantrik Dal on 16 February 1999 in Kalidaspur Government Primary School, Kalidaspur, Daulatpur Upazila, Kushtia District. The rally was attacked by Purbo Banglar Communist Party, who killed Ahmed and four other politicians of Jatiya Samajtantrik Dal. On 30 August 2004, 10 people were sentenced to death and 12 were sentenced to life-imprisonment. In 2016, three of the convicts were hanged. One of those sentenced to death was arrested on 19 August 2021 by Rapid Action Battalion from Rajshahi.

Kazi Aref Parishad works to preserve Ahmed's memory.

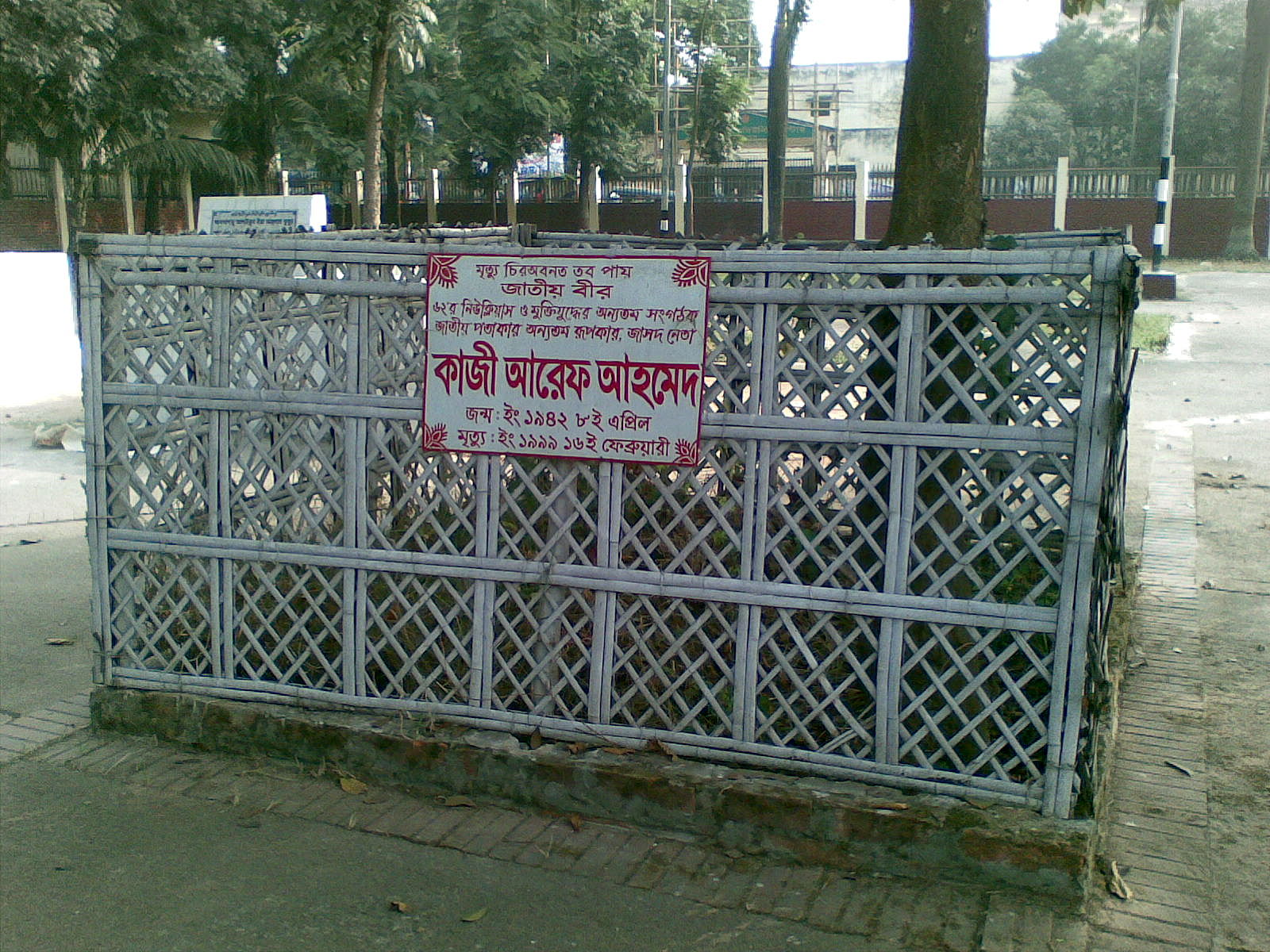
Grave of Ahmed in Martyred Intellectuals Graveyard, Mirpur
