= Serajul Alam Khan =

Bangladeshi politician (1941–2023)

- সিরাজুল আলম খান

General Secretary of East Pakistan Students' League
- In office 1965–1967
- President: KM Obaidur Rahman
- Preceded by: Sheikh Fazlul Haque Mani
- Succeeded by: Abdur Razzaq

Personal details
- Born: Nizam Mohammad Serajul Alam Khan; 6 January 1941 Begumganj, Bengal, British India
- Died: 9 June 2023 (aged 82) Dhaka, Bangladesh
- Citizenship: British subject (1941-1947); Pakistan (1947–1971); Bangladesh (1971-2023)
- Party: Jatiya Samajtantrik Dal (1972–1996)
- Education: Khulna Zilla School; Dhaka College; University of Dhaka
- Nicknames: Dadabhai; Kapalik

Military service
- Allegiance: Bangladesh
- Branch/service: Mukti Bahini
- Unit: Mujib Bahini
- Battles/wars: Bangladesh Liberation War

Nizam Mohammad Serajul Alam Khan (6 January 1941 – 9 June 2023), commonly known as Serajul Alam Khan (Bengali: সিরাজুল আলম খান), also called as Dada, Dadabhai and by his initials SAK, was a Bangladeshi politician, political analyst, philosopher and writer who spearheaded the Bangladesh liberation movement but also became one of the controlling forces of political polarization in post-independence Bangladesh.

Serajul Alam Khan joined politics in the 1950s–60s as a student and quickly rose to the helm of Chhatra League, the student wing affiliated with the Bengali nationalist Awami League party in Pakistan. He, along with others, founded the Swadhin Bangla Biplobi Parishad (which came to be known as 'Nucleus'), a secret organization whose existence is not directly documented but strongly supported by popular hearsay and conventional history. The organization played a significant role in the Bangladesh Liberation War. He along with Tofael Ahmed, Sheikh Fazlul Haque Moni and Abdur Razzaq formed and commanded the Mujib Bahini (a.k.a. Bangladesh Liberation Force).

== Early life ==
Khan was born on 6 January 1941 in Noakhali District in the then Bengal Presidency, British India. His father, Khorshed Alam Khan, was a government officer who retired in 1959 as the Deputy Director of Public Instruction. He graduated from Khulna Zilla School in 1956 and Dhaka College in 1958. He studied mathematics at the University of Dhaka from 1958 to 1962.

== Career ==
Khan as a student of the University of Dhaka created the Nucleus whose aim was the separation of East Pakistan along with Kazi Aref Ahmed and Abdur Razzaq. The Nucleus helped launch the Six point movement, Eleven Points Programme, designed the flag of independent Bangladesh, picked the national anthem, and the national slogan Joy Bangla. It gave the title of Bangabandhu to Sheikh Mujibur Rahman.

Khan served as the general secretary of the student political organization East Pakistan Chhatra League from 1963 to 1965.

Together with other members of the Nucleus, Khan created the Bangladesh Liberation Force and an armed wing called the Joy Bangla Bahini which would be present throughout East Pakistan by 1970. At the urging of Sheikh Mujibur Rahman, the command structure was expanded to include Sheikh Fazlul Huq Moni, and Tofail Ahmed. As a key member of Nucleus, he helped writing and editing Sheikh Mujibur Rahman's historic speech of the 7th March, 1971. During the Bangladesh Liberation War, the Bangladesh Liberation Force would be renamed to Mujib Bahini after Sheikh Mujibur Rahman.

Soon after returning to free the country from dissension within the pro-liberation mainstream power base, Khan became conspicuous between left-of-centre leadership and simmering far-left young radicals. He was involved in a political struggle with Sheikh Fazlul Haque Mani. He developed an ideological difference from Sheikh Fazlul Haque Mani, due to the former's advocacy of scientific socialism, thus forming the Jatiyo Samajtantrik Dal. In 1975, Sheikh Fazlul Haque Mani urged him to join BaKSAL, but he refused.

After the 7 November 1975 Bangladeshi coup d'état, Khan along with other leaders of Jatiyo Samajtantrik Dal were arrested. Khan was in jail from 26 July 1976 to 1 May 1981. After being released from jail, he started the publication of Ganakantha newspaper.

The government of Prime Minister Khaleda Zia prevented Khan from holding meetings at the government owned Hotel Sheraton.

== Illness and death ==
In 2006, he was hospitalised in London and underwent a bypass operation.

Khan died from respiratory failure at Dhaka Medical College Hospital on 9 June 2023. He was 82 at the time of his death.

== See also ==
- Swadhin Bangla Biplobi Parishad
