= Jatiya Samajtantrik Dal =

Political party in Bangladesh

Jatiya Samajtantrik Dal জাতীয় সমাজতান্ত্রিক দল
- Abbreviation: JaSoD
- Leader: Hasanul Haq Inu
- Founder: Serajul Alam Khan; A. S. M. Abdur Rab; Abu Taher; Mohammad Abdul Jalil
- Founded: 1972 October 31; 53 years ago
- Split from: Bangladesh Chhatra League (Awami League)
- Headquarters: 22/1 Topkhana Road (4th Floor), Dhaka
- Student wing: JASAD Chhatra League
- Armed wing: Gonobahini (1972–76); Biplobi Shainik Sangstha (1973–75)
- Ideology: Left-wing nationalism Historical: Scientific socialism
- National affiliation: Grand Alliance
- Colours: Red
- Bangladesh Parliament: 0 / 350

Party flag
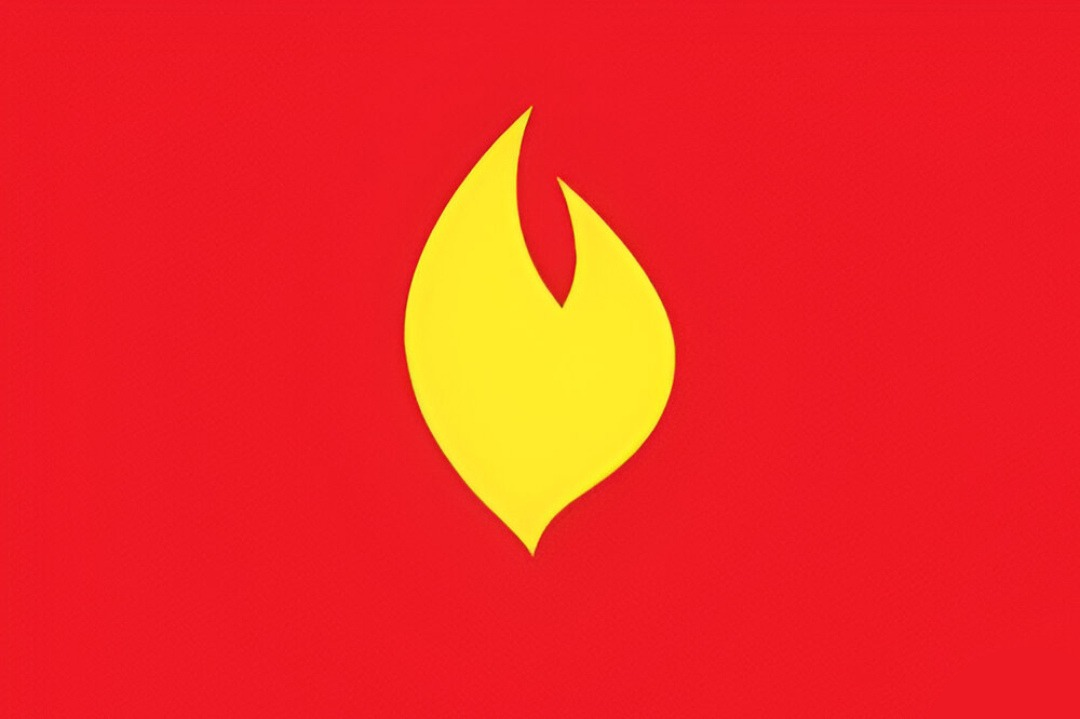

The Jatiya Samajtantrik Dal (Bengali: জাতীয় সমাজতান্ত্রিক দল, lit. 'National Socialist Party') is a political party in Bangladesh. The party was founded by Serajul Alam Khan. The party was dominant during the 1972–1975 Bangladesh insurgency. The current party president is Hasanul Haque Inu.

== History ==
Historical flag of the party

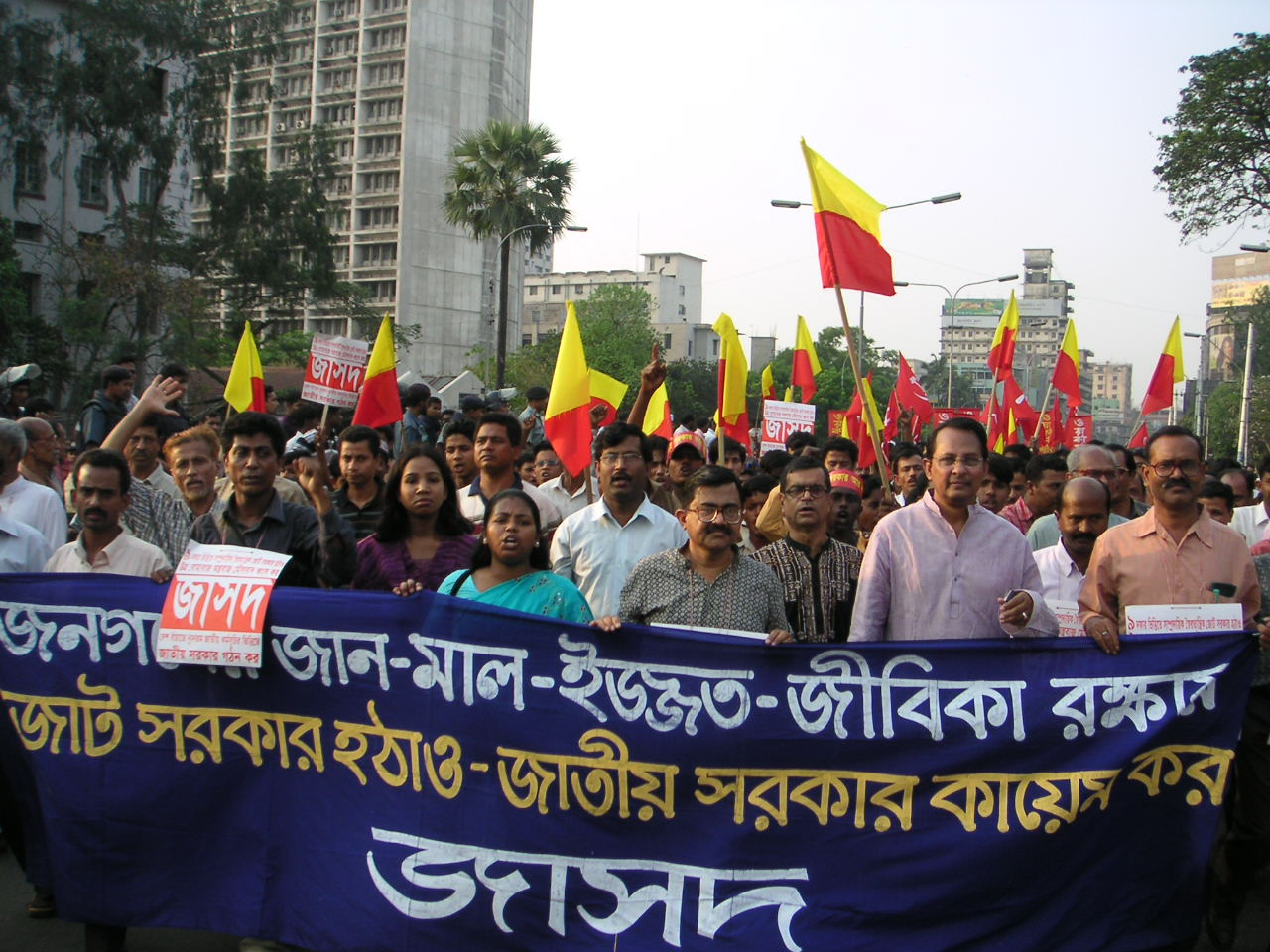
Jasad protesters at an opposition rally in 2005

The Jatiya Samajtantrik Dal (JASAD) was formed on 31 October 1972 when it split from Bangladesh Chhatra League, the student wing of the Bangladesh Awami League, under the leadership of Serajul Alam Khan, M. A. Jalil, ASM Abdur Rab and Shajahan Siraj. It had an armed wing, Gonobahini, led by Colonel Abu Taher and Hasanul Haq Inu, Kazi Aref Ahmed, Monirul Islam, Sharif Nurul Ambia that led a violent left-wing insurgency against the regime of Sheikh Mujibur Rahman. Their aim was to form a new left wing democratic national government, for facilitating establishing a socialist state with Bangladeshi characteristics. This led the government to use the pro-Mujib Jatiya Rakkhi Bahini to counter the insurgency by the Gonobahini.

=== Assassination of Sheikh Mujibur Rahman ===
Before the coup of 15 August 1975, Jatiya Samajtantrik Dal had planned to organize a mass upsurge to form a democratic national government replacing Sheikh Mujibur Rahman.

After Sheikh Mujibur Rahman and his family were assassinated on 15 August 1975, Jatiya Samajtantrik Dal leader Abu Taher showed his support and remarked: "The corpse of Sheikh Mujib should have been thrown into The Bay of Bengal".

On 7 November 1975, forces loyal to Colonel Abu Taher rescued army chief Ziaur Rahman from house arrest. When Ziaur Rahman realized that Abu Taher was moving the country into a direction of leftist communism, which contradicted Zia's right wing views, Zia declared martial law, formed the right wing Bangladesh Nationalist Party and cracked down on the Jatiya Samajtantrik Dal by executing Abu Taher and sentencing other leaders to various prison terms.

=== Factions ===
During Ziaur Rahman's rule, Jatiya Samajtantrik Dal split up twice. The party fragmented again during the regime of Hussain Muhammad Ershad in the 1980s, with ASM Abdur Rab and Shajahan Siraj heading two separate factions. Abdur Rab's faction, Jatiya Samajtantrik Dal-JSD, became the opposition after taking part in the 1988 elections, that were boycotted by all major political parties. After the Bangladesh Nationalist Party (BNP) came to power in 1991, Jatiya Samajtantrik Dal allied itself with former rivals Bangladesh Awami League to counter growing BNP and right wing influence in the country. ASM Abdur Rab later served as a minister from 1996 to 2001 in the Awami League-led government. After the BNP returned to power in 2001, Shajahan Siraj merged his party with it.

Meanwhile, Inu, who became MP after winning elections as a grand alliance nominee with the victorious Awami League's boat as his symbol in 2008, was made Information Minister. After another split, the general secretary of the Inu-led faction was Shirin Akhter.

== Election results ==
=== Jatiya Sangsad elections ===
Election	Party Leader	Votes	%	Seats	+/-	Position	Government
1973	Serajul Alam Khan	1,229,110	6.52%	1 / 300	New	▲3rd	Opposition
1979	Serajul Alam Khan	931,851	4.83%	8 / 300	▲7	▼4rd	Opposition
1991	Hasanul Haq Inu	171,011	0.50	0 / 300	▼8	▼11th	Opposition
2001	Hasanul Haq Inu	119,382	0.21	0 / 300	0	▲9th	Opposition
2008	Hasanul Haq Inu	506,605	0.72	3 / 300	▲3	▲4th	Coalition Government
2014	Hasanul Haq Inu	203,799	1.19	5 / 300	▲2	4th	Coalition Government
2018	Hasanul Haq Inu	610,044	0.72	2 / 300	▼3	▼6th	Coalition Government
2024	Hasanul Haq Inu	182,023	0.51%	1 / 300	▼1	▲4th	Coalition Government

== See also ==
- Jatiya Samajtantrik Dal (Rab)
