= Regiment of Artillery (Bangladesh) =

Artillery arm of the Bangladesh Army

- গোলন্দাজ বাহিনী
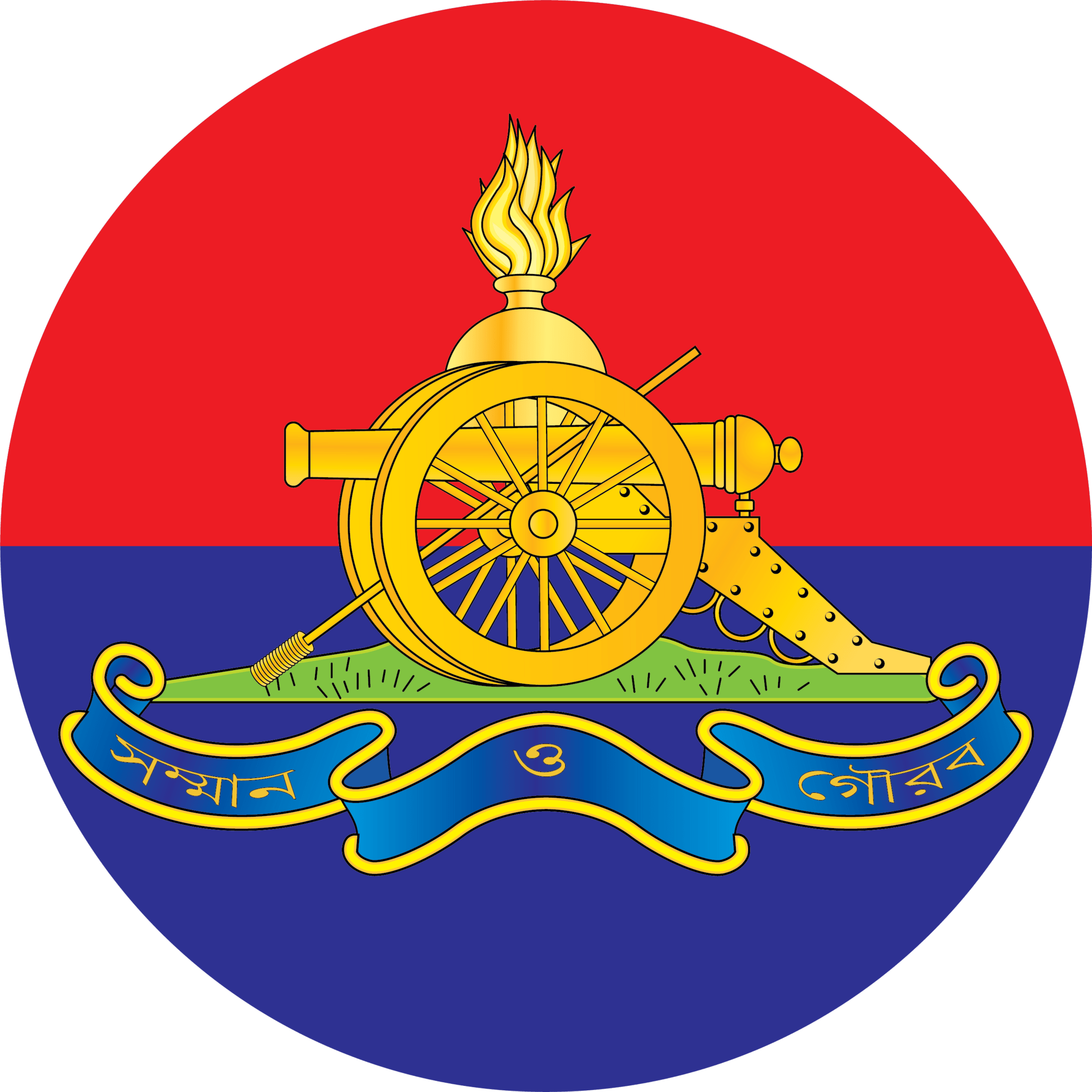
- Insignia of the Regiment of Artillery
- Active: 1971 – present
- Allegiance: Bangladesh
- Branch: Bangladesh Army
- Type: Artillery
- Garrison/HQ: Halishahar Cantonment
- Nickname: Gunners
- Mottos: Honor and Pride (Note: সম্মান ও গৌরব, Romanized: śammaan ō gaurab)
- Colors: Red and Blue
- Engagements: Military history of Bangladesh

Commanders
- Colonel Commandant: Major General Ashrafuzzaman Siddiqui
- Notable Colonel of the Regiment: Anwar Hussain; Muhammad Nurul Anwar; Aziz Ahmed; Atiqur Rahman

Regiment of Artillery is one of the combat arms of the Bangladesh Army.

== History ==
The regiment of artillery was established on 22 July 1971, through Mujib Battery. The artillery formation primarily consisted six 3.7 inches howitzer.

One of the early units of the regiment of artillery, the 2nd Field Artillery Regiment, played a vital role in the 15 August 1975 coup d'état. That time it was commanded by Khandaker Abdur Rashid. The same unit was also involved in the 3 November coup d'état of the same year; and then days later, during the 7 November coup d'état, the unit saved former Chief of Army Staff Ziaur Rahman, who was kept under house arrest. This paved his way of becoming the country's statesman.

The regiment also played a vital role in the upcoming military warfare. During the Chittagong Hill Tracts conflict, units of artillery regiments were deployed. G. M. Mushfiqur Rahman was the only officer of regiment of artillery who was awarded Bir Uttom after the Bangladesh Liberation War during the warfare. Units from the artillery regiment were part of Operation Dabanal and Operation Uttaran as well. It continues to conduct operation against militants in the Chittagong Hill Tracts.

Units of regiment of artillery worked for in aid to civil power, and has conducted humanitarian relief programs in various occasions.

== Units ==
There are several types of units under regiment of artillery, such as Field Artillery, Self Propelled Artillery, Medium Caliber, MLRS, Short range air defense missile regiment, Individual ADA and Air Defence Regiment.

The Air Defence was a part of the regiment of artillery, which was later raised as a new corps of the Army.

== Notable personnel ==
Several officers of the regiment of artillery have received gallantry awards.

Bir Uttom —

1. Kazi Nuruzzaman
2. Rafiqul Islam
3. Abu Taher Mohammad Haider
4. Mirza Aftabul Qader
5. G. M. Mushfiqur Rahman

Bir Bikrom —

1. Imamuzzaman Chowdhury

Bir Protik —

1. Rashed Chowdhury (revoked)
2. Quazi Sazzad Ali Zahir
