= Operation Kilo Flight =

Military operation taken by the Mukti Bahini

"Kilo Flight"
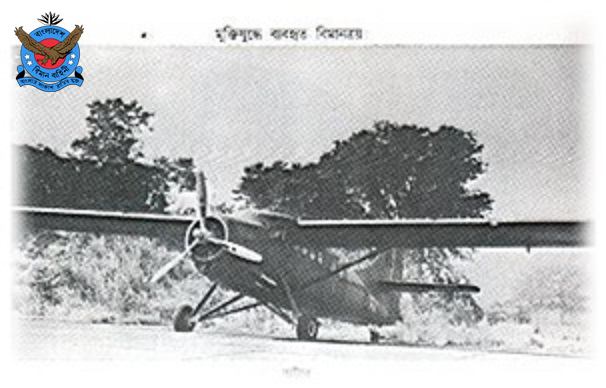
- The DHC-3 Otter used by the Mukti bahini aviation group
- Active: August 1971–March 1972
- Country: Bangladesh (Bangladesh)
- Allegiance: Provisional Government of the People's Republic of Bangladesh
- Branch: বাংলাদেশ বিমান বাহিনী Bānglādēśh Bimān Bāhinī
- Type: Military aviation
- Role: Hit and Run Raids, Supply runs, Air Rescue
- Part of: Bangladesh Armed Forces
- Nickname: BAF1
- Anniversaries: Armed Forces Day (November 21)
- Engagements: Bangladesh Liberation War

Commanders
- Chief of Air Staff: Group Captain A.K. Khandker BU
- Officer Commanding Kilo Flight: Flight Lieutenant Sultan Mahmud BU

Insignia
- Ensign

- Roundel

- Fin Flash

Aircraft flown
- Bomber: De Havilland Canada DHC -3 Otter (converted)
- Helicopter: Aerospatiale Alouette III (converted)
- Transport: Dakota

Kilo Flight was the code name for the Mukti Bahini combat aviation formation during the Bangladesh Liberation War in 1971. It consisted of one DHC-3 Otter plane and one Alouette III helicopter, both carrying rocket pods and machine guns for launching hit-and-run attacks on Pakistani targets, and one DC-3 Dakota for logistical missions. 9 Bengali pilots and 58 former PAF personnel formed the unit under the command of Group Captain A. K. Khandker in September 1971. The aircraft were supplied by Indian Authorities and the formation was led by Squadron Leader Sultan Mahmud under the operational control of IAF base Jorhat. The unit started training in October 1971 at Dimapur in Nagaland, and this unit was the first to launch airstrikes on Pakistani targets in East Pakistan on December 4, 1971, by attacking oil depots at Narayanganj and Chittagong. In total, the unit flew 90 sorties and 40 combat missions between December 4 and 16, 1971. After the war, this unit formed the core of the nascent Bangladesh Air Force.

== Background ==
The Partition of British India led to the assets and personnel of the Royal Indian Air Force being divided between India and Pakistan in 1947. Pakistan concentrated most of her military assets in West Pakistan, and the first combat aircraft deployed in East Pakistan was a squadron of Hawker Fury biplanes in 1956. No. 14 squadron flying F-86 Sabres were stationed in East Pakistan in 1964, and during the War of 1965 they earned the name "Tail Choppers" by launching successful raids on the Indian Air Force base at Kalaikunda, near Kharagpur in West Bengal, destroying several English Electric Canberra and de Havilland Vampire bombers on the ground. In March 1971, the eastern contingent of the PAF, under the command of Air Commodore Mitty Masud, had 1,222 personnel, of whom 645 were of Bengali origin, and two fully operational bases at Tejgaon and Chittagong. The PAF had 16 Sabres (No. 14 Squadron OC Wing Commander Muhammad Afzal Chawdhary), two T-33 trainers, and two Alouette III helicopters stationed in East Pakistan, while Pakistan Army "Log Flight" of Army Aviation Squadron No. 4 under Major Liakat Bukhari contained two Mil Mi-8 and two Alouette III helicopters in East Pakistan.

=== Bengali servicemen and political concerns ===
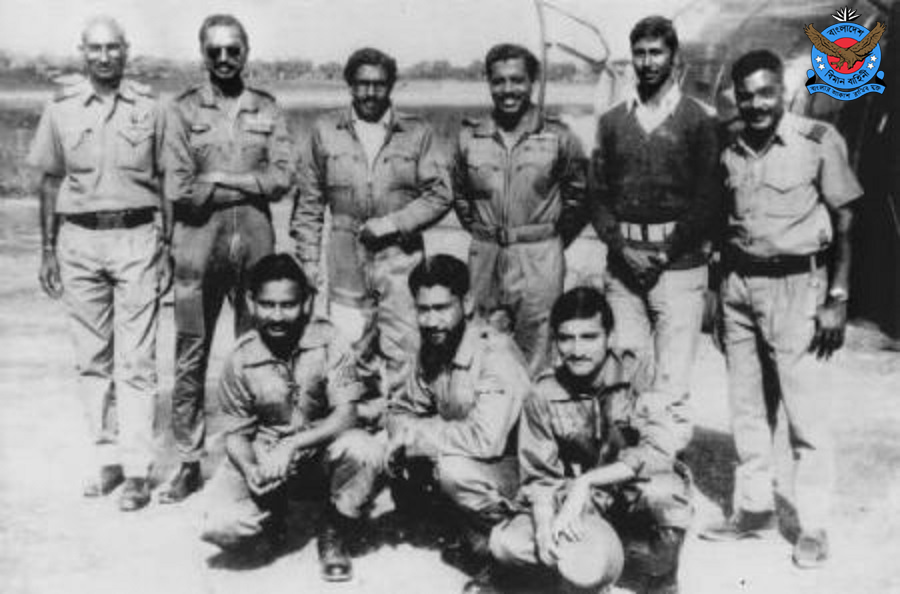
Kilo Flight personnel (1971)

The victory of Awami League in the 1970 elections was followed by a period of political uncertainty as General Yahia Khan delayed the transfer of power to Awami League. This eventually led to Awami League launching a non-cooperation movement that eventually confined the authority of the Pakistan Central government to the cantonments and government institutions in East Pakistan. The Pakistani government decided to launch a military crackdown and began to move soldiers in civilian clothes to Dhaka using PIA and PAF aircraft from February 1971.

Bengali military officers were alarmed by the buildup of Pakistani forces and concerned about their own safety. The Awami League leadership, attempting to find a peaceful political solution to the crisis, did not endorse any preemptive action or preparation for conflict by Bengali soldiers. Warnings by Bengali officers that the Pakistan Army was preparing to strike were ignored, and junior Bengali officers were told by their superiors to be prudent and avoid dealing with political issues, while Col. Osmani also advised the Bengali officers against taking any "rash" actions. The Pakistan Army caught the Bengali political leadership and soldiers by surprise when they initiated Operation Searchlight on March 25, 1971.

== Bengali PAF personnel in Mukti Bahini ==
Initial Bengali resistance to Operation Searchlight was spontaneous and disorganized. Bengali soldiers were largely unaware of the overall military situation in East Pakistan; many units continued to perform routine duties until March 31, rebelling only after coming under Pakistani attack. Group Captain A. K. Khandker, OC Administration Wing of PAF East Pakistan, had witnessed the departure of Yahya Khan from East Pakistan prior to the start of the Pakistani attack on March 25 and had warned Awami League members, and he had earlier also warned Sheikh Mujibur Rahman regarding the Pakistani troop buildup in Dhaka. However, no countrywide communication initially reached Bengali soldiers to begin the uprising; they rebelled when they came under attack or eventually heard about Pakistani attacks on Bengalis.

Air Commodore Mitty Masud had opposed Operation Searchlight on moral grounds in a meeting of Pakistani senior officers on March 15 and then had refused requests from the Army to commence airstrikes on March 29, 1971, in East Pakistan. He also had assured Bengali PAF staff of their personal safety on March 27 and on March 30 gave them the option of declining missions or going on leave, but also warned them against committing treason. Later, Bengali airmen and staff were laid off duty. Air Commodore Masud was relieved of his post on March 31 and was replaced by Air Commodore Inamul Haque Khan for the duration of the conflict. Several hundred Bengali officers and soldiers, airmen and naval personnel were deployed to West Pakistan between March and November 1971, while the Pakistan Army imprisoned 21 army and 4 air force officers and several hundred soldiers in East Pakistan. Forty-six Bengali army officers were killed by the Pakistani authorities between March and November 1971; however, no Bengali air force officers were victims of such a fate during that time period.

After March 26, Pakistani Army was initially confined to a handful of bases across the province, cut off and surrounded by the Mukti Bahini, but by mid-April the Army had occupied all the large towns, and by mid-June Mukti Bahaini had been driven across the border into India. Serving and retired PAF personnel, along with Bengali soldiers and officers, had begun to join Mukti Bahini after March 26. Eight Bengali officers of the PAF, including Group Captain Khandkar, had crossed the border in mid-May, and eventually, 44 officers and 729 airmen would join up between March and October 1971. Of the forty-four ex-PAF officers who joined Mukti Bahini, ten came out of retirement, eight were officer cadets of PAF before their defection to Mukti Bahini, nine officers joined up while they were on leave in East Pakistan, and three officers came from postings abroad. Most of the Air Force personnel joined the Mukti Bahini and fought shoulder to shoulder with the other freedom fighters in various Mukti Bahini sectors throughout 1971, and some later joined Kilo Flight when it was formed in September 1971. Bangladesh Airforce personnel will go on to earn one Bir Shreshtho, 5 Bir Uttam, one Bir Bikram and eleven Bir Protik medals for their contribution in the liberation war, while seventeen Bengali officers would continue to serve in the PAF in East Pakistan until December 16, 1971. Between March and November, 46 Bengali airmen died in combat.

=== Bengali airmen in Mukti Bahini ===
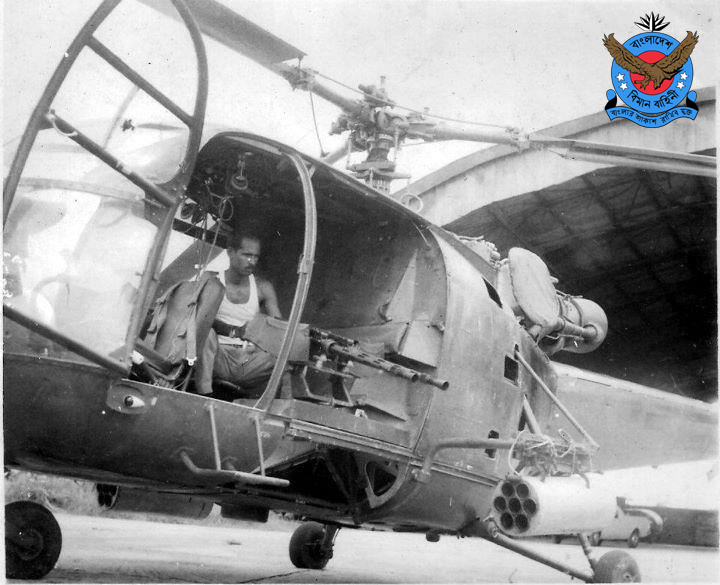
A Kilo Flight member on the helicopter (1971).

The Indian Army sometimes helped the Mukti Bahini, through Operation Jackpot, since May 1971, while the Indian Navy helped set up the Bengali Naval commando unit and then provided command staff for the Bengali gunboats, which were used to mine riverine craft and harass merchant marine operations in East Pakistan. The IAF had flown reconnaissance flights over East Pakistan since June 1971, but could not come to grips with the PAF until formal hostilities commenced. Former PAF officers and personnel were employed in various Mukti Bahani formations engaged in guerrilla warfare as they joined up, since Mukti Bahini lacked any aircraft or air defense equipment. Group Captain Abdul Karim Khandker became the deputy Chief of Staff of Mukti Bahini, Wing Commander Khademul Bashar, a veteran B-57 pilot, became Commander of Mukti Bahini Sector 6, with Squadron Leader Sadruddin as his deputy, Flt. Lt Sultan Mahmud led a guerrilla squad in Sector 1 before joining Kilo Flight, Flying Officer Badrul Alam, an ex F-6 Fighter Pilot of PAF, who had defected with the first batch of Air Force Officers in May 1971, initially joined as a Staff Officer at Mukti Bahini HQ and later joined Kilo Flight after its formation. During June–July, Mukti Bahini had regrouped across the border with Indian support given through Operation Jackpot and began sending 2000 – 5000 guerrillas across the border, the so-called Monsoon Offensive, which for various reasons (lack of proper training, supply shortage, lack of a proper support network inside Bangladesh, etc.) failed to achieve its objectives. By July–August, Pakistani authorities had concluded that they had contained the Mukti Bahini's Monsoon Offensive.

==== Mukti Bahini Air wing proposal ====
Group Captain Khandker, after becoming the Deputy Chief of Staff of Bangladesh Forces on July 19, 1971, continued to engage Bangladesh Government in Exile and Indian officials regarding obtaining aircraft for Mukti Bahini, being concerned that Bengali pilots were losing their skills due to lack of flying, and the possibility of launching air attacks against Pakistani targets between May and September with a Mukti Bahini air unit emulating the activity of Biafran Air Force. Bengali diplomats who had left their posts had sent information on aircraft procurement during April–August 1971 to Bangladesh Government, the purchase cost was to be funded by Bengali diaspora across the world, but this ultimately did not materialize. Since, Mukti Bahini lacked international recognition as a separate sovereign legal entity, the Indian Government could not sanction IAF to offer any modern aircraft or the use of its official facilities to Mukti Bahini.

Air Chief Marshall P.C. Lal, then Commander of IAF, Mrs Ila Lal and Khandker had met for dinner in August, and the idea of a Mukti Bahini air unit was again discussed. IAF then offered to donate two De Havilland Vampire for Mukti Bahini, or absorb Bengali pilots into Indian Air formations for the duration of the conflict. The Vampire aircraft were obsolete, and Bengali pilots had trained in aircraft not used by the IAF so would need lengthy conversion training, so Mukti Bahini ultimately did not take up the offers. P.C. Lal, however, gave a positive recommendation to the Indian government for helping create a Mukti Bahini air wing, and a few days later, IAF received permission and agreed to provide non-combat aircraft, logistical support and a training facility to Mukti Bahini. Gp. Capt. Khandker detailed Flt. Lt. Badrul Alam, who was then serving as a staff officer in the Mukti Bahini Headquarter to select pilots and airmen for Mukti Bahini Air wing from September 24, 1971.

== Formation and training ==
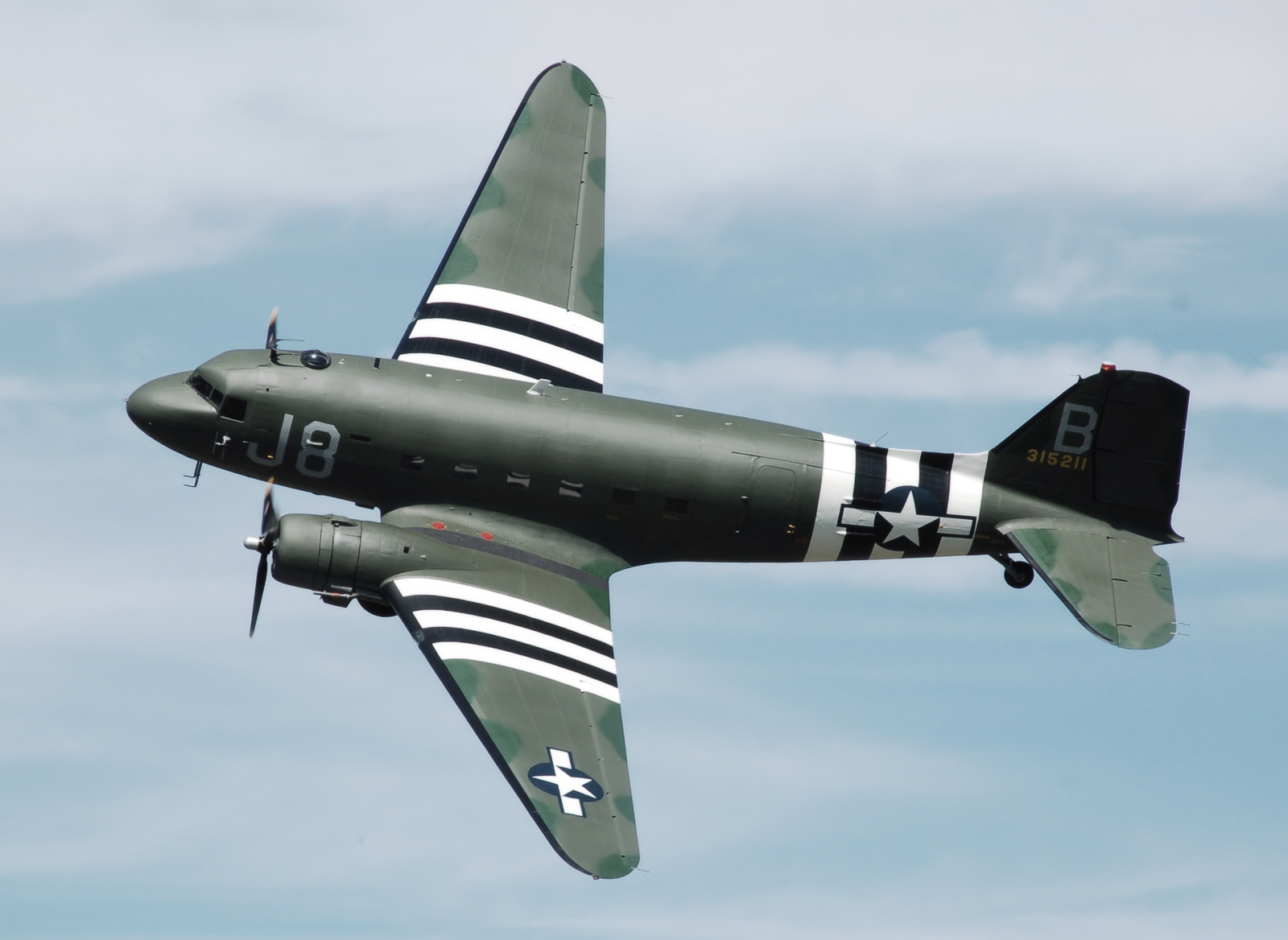
A former USAAF C-47A Skytrain which flew from a base in Devon, England, during the D-Day Normandy invasion and shows "invasion stripes" on her wings and fuselage.

Seven Bengali pilots and fifty-eight technicians, who were former members of the PAF, and then serving with the Mukti Bahini in various capacities - were gathered to form the Air Wing by September 28, 1971, at Dimapur in Nagaland. Indian civilian authorities and the IAF donated one DC-3 Dakota (given by the Maharaja of Jodhpor), one DHC-3 Otter plane, which had been in service with the IAF since 1959, and one Alouette III helicopter for the newborn Bangladesh Air Force. Bengali pilots were assembled at Dimapur on September 28, 1971. Most of them were flown in from Agartala. Training commenced on September 29. Captains Muqeet, Khaleque, and Satter were selected to fly the Dakota; Captains Akram, Sharafuddin and Flight Lt. Shamsul Alam were to convert in the Otter. Sqn. Ldr. Sultan Mahmud, an experienced PAF Helicopter pilot, Flt. Lt. Badrul Alam an ex-PAF F-6 Fighter Pilot, and Capt Shahabuddin, an ex-PIA pilot were to fly the Alouette.

These propeller-driven aircraft were to take advantage of the lack of night-fighting capability of the PAF to launch hit-and-run attacks on sensitive targets inside Bangladesh from the air. Gp. Capt. Khandker, along with Flight Lieutenant Shamsul Alam (an F-86 Sabre pilot who escaped from Pakistani captivity on August 5, 1971), flew to Dimapur via Gauhati on September 27, and in the presence of Air Chief Marshall P.C. Lal, took delivery and inaugurated the newly formed Bangladesh Air Force. The unit officially became active on September 28, 1971 – the birthday of the Bangladesh Air Force. The unit was dubbed "Kilo Flight", the first fighting formation of the nascent Bangladesh Air force.

=== Pilots ===
Nine pilots were assembled at Dimapur to fly the 3 aircraft. Flight Lieutenant Shamsul Alam, along with Flight Lieutenant Badrul Alam, were PAF trained pilots. They were later joined on October 14, 1971, by Squadron Leader Sultan Mahmud, who had been previously wounded in a guerrilla operation in Chittagong, which had delayed his arrival, and he became the commanding officer of this unit. Captains Abdus Sattar, Shahabuddin, and Muqeet were F-27 pilots from PIA, while Captain Khaleque was a PIA veteran with 10,000 hours in a Boeing 707. Captain Akram Ahmad worked for the East Pakistan Plant Protection Agency, and Captain Sharafuddin, deputed to the same agency, was actually an employee of Ciba-Geigy company.

Dimapur had a World War II-era 5000 ft runway, a single control tower, and some buildings, all surrounded by dense jungle. Bengali rank and file fixed up the World War II vintage runway at Dimapur, then took over the servicing duties for the 3 aircraft. Logistics and administration were coordinated by Group Captain Chandan Singh, station commander of IAF base Jorhat. After a few days of test-flying, the aircraft were taken and refitted at various IAF service stations. Squadron Leader Sanjay Kumar Chowdhury, who became liaison officer between IAF and Kilo Flight, and Flight Lieutenant Chandra Mohan Singla of IAF were attached as trainers.

== Refitted Kilo Flight aircraft ==
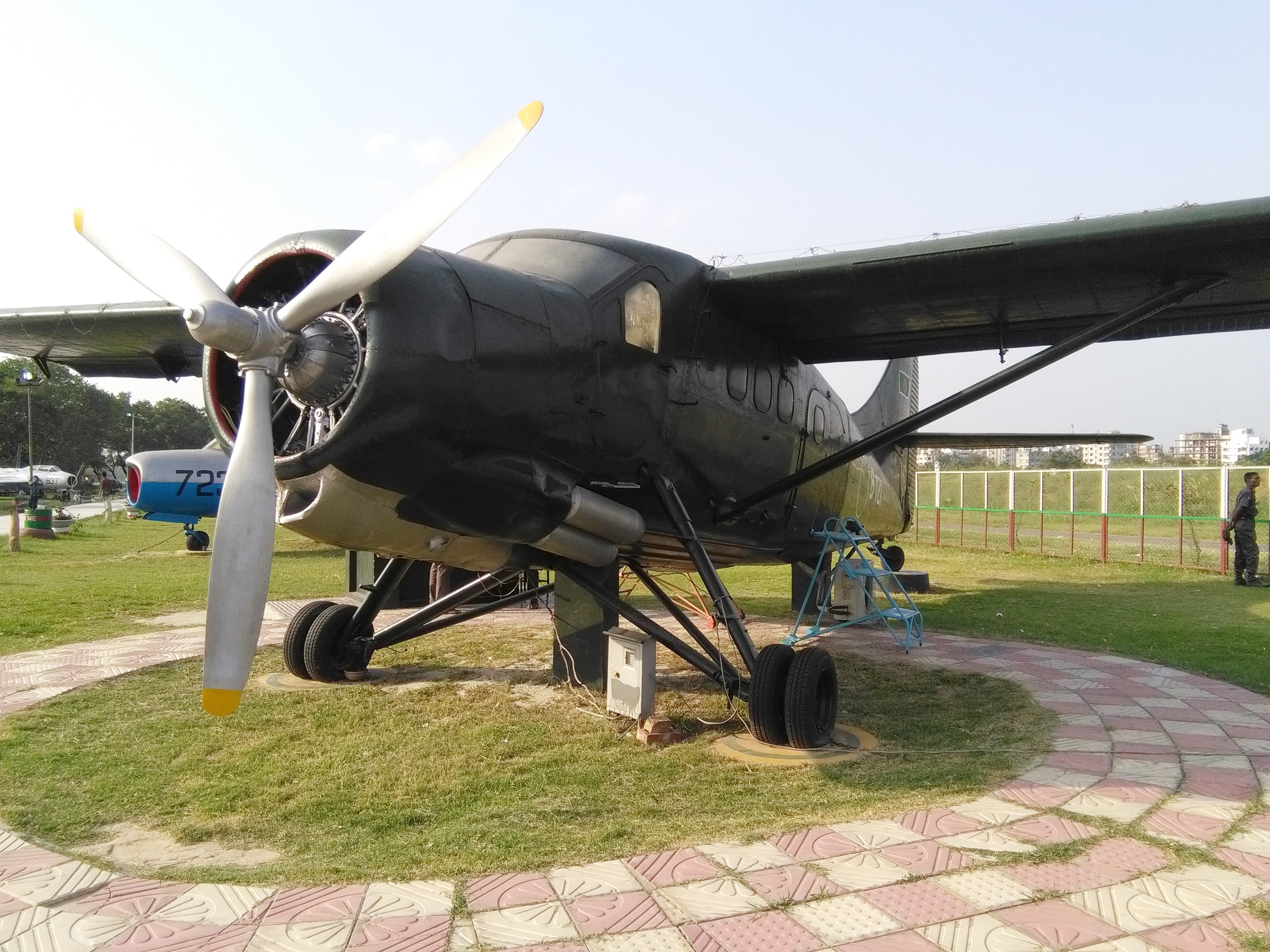
Replica of the Otter upgraded by Mukti Bahini in 1971

The Otter boasted 7 rockets under each of its wings and could deliver ten 25-pound bombs, which were rolled out of the aircraft by hand through a makeshift door. Flight Lt. Shamsul Alam, along with Captains Akram Ahmed and Sharfuddin Ahmad, flew the Otter. Flight Lieutenant Ghosal of the IAF converted these pilots into the Otter.

The Dakota was modified to carry ten 500-pound bombs, for low-level bombings. A section of the floor was cut out, and a jury-rigged devise was installed to drop the bombs on target. Near the back door of the Dakota, a bomb rack was installed to hold five 1000-pound bombs. An officer was to manually push them off the rack and one second interval, after the pilot signaled him with a bell. Captain Abdul Khaleque, Captain Satter, and Captain Abdul Muqeet, all destined to earn the Bir Pratik award, piloted the Dakota. Flight Lieutenant Sinha of IAF was the instructor and flight safety officer.

The helicopter was rigged to fire 14 rockets from pylons attached to its side and had a twin-barreled .303 Browning machine gun installed underneath the main helicopter pod, in addition to having 1-inch (25 mm) steel plate welded to its floor for extra protection. Squadron Leader Sultan Mahmood, Flight Lieutenant Badrul Alam, and Captain Shahabuddin, all of whom later won the Bir Uttam award, operated the helicopter.

=== Flying and firing training ===
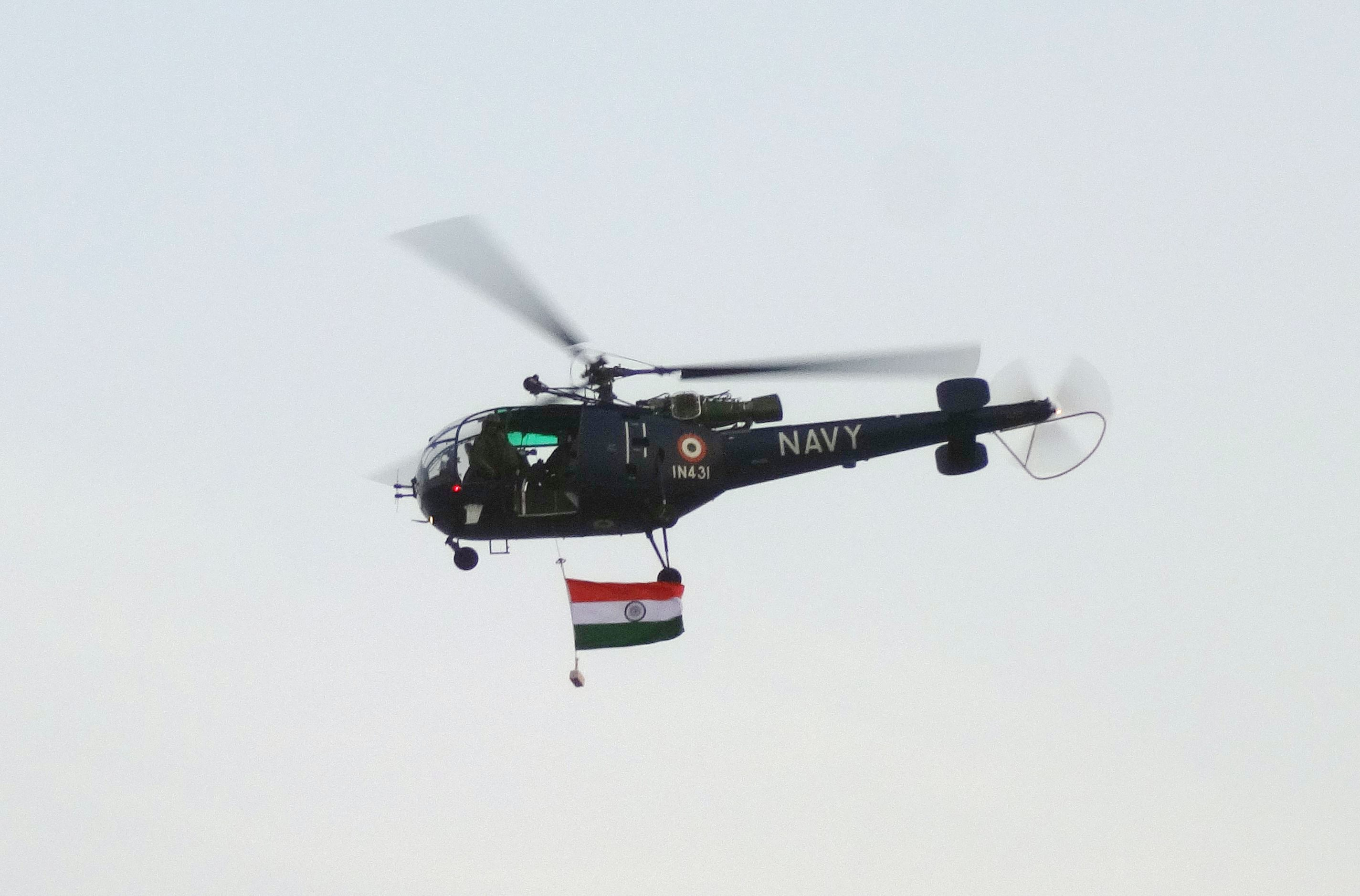
Indian Navy Chetak During IFR 2016, Pakistan Army Aviation and Air Force, Indian Air Force and Navy, and Bangladesh Air Force used Alouette III Helicopters in 1971. BAF installed machine guns and rocket pods in their craft.

The propeller-driven aircraft were slow and were no match for the F-86 Sabre aircraft of the Pakistan Air Force, and flying them in broad daylight for low-level strafing and bombing also risked getting hit by anti-aircraft fire. While the Bengali pilots went through their conversion training on the aircraft with their IAF trainers, BAF and IAF command decided that the initial missions of Kilo Flight would be carried out at night. The aircraft would fly low to avoid radar detection, then pop up to hit their targets, and fly back to base. Under the command of Squadron Leader Sultan Mahmud, guided by the Indian instructors, intense training took place in night flying and instrumental navigation. Dimapur was a remote place surrounded by dense jungle, so the training went unnoticed. A white parachute was dropped on a tree to serve as target, pilots would take off after 12 at night, navigate to their destinations, locate their target in the dark visually, and practice, diving, low angle approach, hitting the target with rockets and machine gun fire, and then flying back. Bengali pilots became proficient in the risky task of night flying and firing, while the Bengali crew serviced the aircraft during the day to keep them operational. All technical glitches were also ironed out; in one case, when it was found that the fuse of the 57 mm rockets was hitting the tail rotor of the helicopter when the rockets were fired, the fuses were changed.

=== Planned initial missions ===
After one month of training, the formation was declared fit for combat by the IAF instructors. Group Captain Chandan Singh briefed A. K. Khandker on the first three possible missions: the Dakota would bomb Dacca Airport, the helicopter was to hit the Air Fuel dumps at Godnail near Narayanganj, and the Otter would attack the Eastern Oil Refinery at Chittagong. The Otter and the Alouette would have to refuel on the way to their targets after starting from Dimapur, as the intended targets lay outside their operational range.

Two changes were made to the proposals before the final missions took place. It was found that when the Dakota pulled up in full throttle after its bombing run, the engine exhaust flames were clearly visible in the dark, making the plane an easy mark for anti-aircraft gunners; the risk was deemed unacceptable, and their combat mission was cancelled. The Dakota was sent to Barrakpur after November 2, 1971, and used to transport Bangladesh government officials and send supplies to remote areas. The Bangladesh government and Bangladesh force commanders vetoed the planned attack on the refinery, pointing out that it was essential for Bangladesh to have the facility intact and operational after Bangladesh was liberated. The target for the Otter was then switched to the fuel dumps of the refinery. The IAF command, aware of the significance of the Bangladesh Liberation War, allotted the honor of first strike against Pakistan from the air to Bengali pilots.

The first sortie was scheduled to take place on November 3, 1971; then it was moved to November 28, but again it was moved back 6 days to December 2, 1971. The Kilo Flight pilots were flown to Jorhat for their final briefings on December 1, 1971, then assembled at Kailashahar. The Otter - flown by Flight Lt. Shamsul Alam with co-pilot Captain Akram - was moved to Kailashsahar and was prepared for a mission against targets in Chittagong. The helicopter, piloted by Sqn.Ldr Sultan Mahmud and Flight Lt. Badrul Alam, was to hit Narayangang, flying from Teliamura.

== First blood: Kilo Flight strikes ==
The Pakistan Air Force initiated Operation Chengiz Khan on December 3, 1971, against several IAF bases in the Western Front around 6:00 PM. In response, the Kilo Flight Otter and helicopter took off to hit their respective targets. The night was a foggy, faintly moonlit one.

The Otter, piloted by Flt. Lt. Shamsul Alam, with Captain Akram as copilot, took off from Kailashahar Airport around 9:00 PM. They were accompanied by LAC Rustam Ali, air gunner, and Corporal Mujammel Haque, the designated bomb aimer in the rear cabin. With the aid of a compass, Flight Lieutenant Alam navigated the airplane as it flew 25 miles to Teliamura, where Kilo Flight ground personnel fired a flare to signal the aircraft to proceed. The Otter flew lower and lower to the ground to avoid rader detection and to navigate through the mist, and after an hour made it to Chittagong, which was 140 miles to the south. The city was observing a blackout, the only lights visible were some ships anchored at the port. The aircraft then turned southeast, located Chittagong Airport, then made a shallow dive to hit two fuel tanks with two rockets. It then made a second rocket attack on the depots and was met by anti-aircraft fire. The Otter pulled up, and on its way out hit a ship with rockets, then flew back north to Kumbhirgram Airport. The Otter pilots returned to Kilashahar the following day.

After the Otter had passed Teliamura, Sqn. Ldr Sultan Mahmud, accompanied by Flt. Lt. Badrul Alam and Sergeant Shahidullah, took off in the Alouette III, heading for Akhaura. The helicopter flew low, and as they passed Akhaura, machine gun and small arms fire from both Pakistani and Indian forces targeted the craft. The Mukti Bahini and the Indian army had attacked Pakistani positions on November 30, and the troops on the ground were on edge. Having crossed the war zone, the helicopter reached Elliotganj on the Dhaka Comilla Highway, then turned to follow the road, flying at treetop levels towards Demra. On the way, the helicopter narrowly avoided colliding with electric poles several times. The helicopter turned south towards Narayanganj along the Shitalakshya River, and at one time the crew realized they were flying very close to the water and had flown below some electric lines in the dark. After reaching the Godnail depot, the helicopter hit the fuel tanks with rockets (It was later confirmed by the locals that 5 tanks were damaged), and then returned to Teliamura, completing the three-hour round-trip with 12–15 minutes of fuel left.

== Further missions ==
The Unit moved from Kailashahar to Agartala to cut down fuel usage and turn around time after December 4, 1971, and used Shamshernagar as a forward base. The Otter flew 12 and the Alouette 77 sorties between December 4 and 16, 1971; about 40 of them were combat missions to attack ground targets in Sylhet, Comilla, Daudkandi and Narshigndi.

The Otter, piloted by Captan Akram, flew several sorties and hit Pakistani positions in Sylhet on December 5 and again on December 6, while on December 6 SqnLdr. Sultan Mahmud and Captain Shahabuddin flew four sorties in the helicopter and rocketed Pakistani troops in Moulvibazar, Sylhet, and on the Kushiyara River. On December 7, the Indian Army used helicopters to land troops in Sylhet. The Alouette, piloted by Flt. Lt. Singla of the IAF and Sultan Mahmud provided ground support by firing rocks and strafed targets near the Sylhet Circuit House and on Pakistani positions along the river Surma to contain the Pakistani attacks. The Alouette was repeatedly hit by small arms fire during these missions but sustained no significant damage.

The Alouette, piloted by Flt. Lt. Badrul Alam and Captain Shahabuddin, attacked Pakistani troops retreating from Sylhet to Bhairab on December 8, while Captain Sharafuddin in the Otter attacked Pakistani troops crossing the Kushiyara river on December 6, 7 and December 8 several times, and after one sortie skillfully landed the craft after its tail rotor was hit by small arms fire near Moulvibazar. The Pakistani army had destroyed the Bhairab bridge and on December 9, Meghna Heli Bridge dropped Mukti Bahini and Indian Soldiers at Riapura near Narshingdi. Kilo Flight aircraft were part of the air cover. Captain Shahabuddinn in the Alouette flew an unsuccessful sortie to rescue Squadron Leader R.C Sachdeva, who had bailed out near Naryanganj on December 10. The Alouette attacked Pakistani positions near Narshingdi on December 11. The Otter, flown by Flt. Lt. Shamsul Alam, was the first fixed-wing aircraft to land at Tejgaon on December 17, after the unconditional surrender of Pakistani Forces to the Joint Command of Bangladesh and Indian Forces the previous day.

== Aftermath ==
Tezgaon airport was made operational by December 25, 1971, through the joint efforts of Indian and Bangladeshi airmen and engineers and Bengali workers. Kilo Flight relocated to Tezgaon during that period. The newly formed Bangladesh Air Force lacked trained personnel, and for some time the base was administered by IAF Air Commodore Kingly. The Bangladesh government awarded six Bir Uttam medals. (Sqn.Ldr. Sultan Mahmud, Flt. Lt. Shamsul Alam, Flt. Lt. Badrul Alam, Captain Akram Ahmed, Shahabuddin Ahmed and Sharafuddin) and six Bir Protik medals (Captains A.S.M.A Khaleque, Kazi Abdus Satter, and Abdul Muqeet, Sergeant Shahidullah, Corporal Muzammel Haque and LAC Rustom Ali) to Kilo Flight personnel. IAF awarded Vir Chakra to Squadron Leader Sanjay Kumar Chowdhury and FL Chandra Mohan Singla for their service in Kilo Flight.

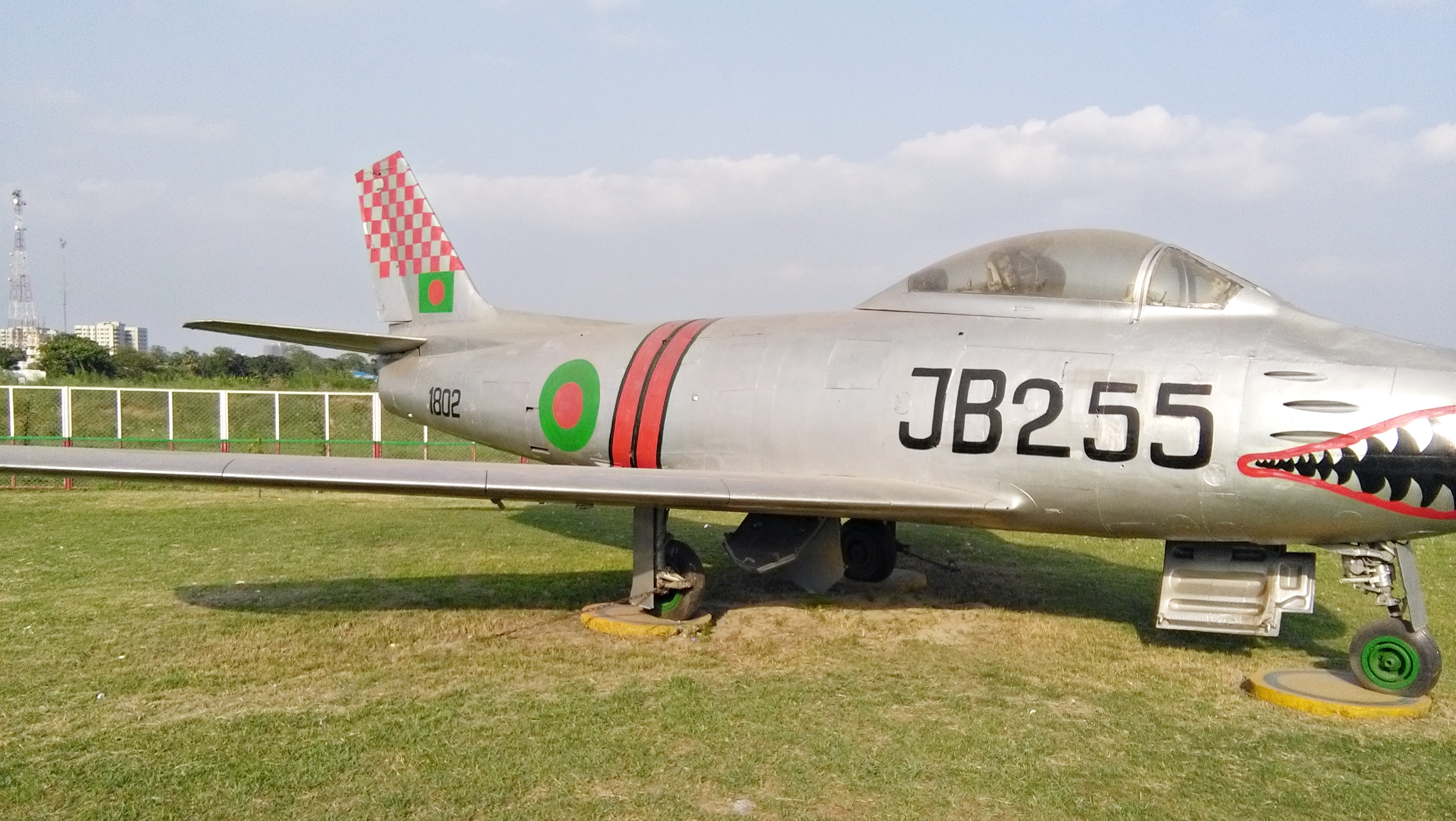
11 F-86 Sabres were disabled by the Pakistan Air Force in December 1971 before their surrender, 5 were returned to service in March 1972 by the Bangladesh Air Force

.

Under the leadership of Air Commodore A. K. Khandker, the newly formed Bangladesh Air Force began to organize itself. The DC-3 was given to Bangladesh Biman; however, it crashed during a training flight, claiming the lives of Kilo Flight members Captain Khaleque and Sharafuddin. Former PAF personnel and officers were requested to muster in Dhaka over radio, and the personnel were grouped into three squadrons under one operational wing under Wing Commander Manjoor. Squadron Leader Sultan Mahmud commanded Squadron No. 501, Squadron Leader Sadruddin Squadron No. 507. Pakistan forces had abandoned eleven Canadair F-86 Sabre jets, two T-33 Shooting Stars, one Alouette III and one Hiller UH-12E4 helicopter in Dhaka. The aircraft had been disabled by Pakistani personnel by cutting instrument wires before the surrender of Pakistani forces. The Hiller was taken over by the Bangladesh Army, while Bengali airmen set to work on fixing the aircraft. By March 1972, 8 Sabres, one T-33 and the Alouette were airworthy. Five of the Sabre fighters, the lone T-33 and the Alouette were activated for service. On March 26, 1972, to mark the first anniversary of Independence Day, the Bangladesh Air Force staged a fly past with two F-86 Sabres, one T-33, three Alouettes and one DHC-3 Otter. These aircraft remained operational until replaced by more modern aircraft after 1973.
