= Sharaf al-Din =

Sharaf al-Din (Arabic: شرف الدين, romanized: Sharaf al-Dīn, lit. 'Honor/Eminence of the Faith') is a masculine given name of Arabic origin. The Turkish form of the name is Şerafettin. Notable people with the name include:

== Given name ==
=== Sharaf al-Din ===
- Sharaf U Dheen (born 1984), Indian actor
- Sharaf ad-Din ibn al-Hasan (died 1258), Yazidi holy figure
- Sharaf al-Din Harun Juvayni (died 1286), Persian statesman and poet
- Sharaf Uddin Khashru (died 2026), Bangladeshi politician
- Sharaf al-Din Qaraqush (died 1212), Ayyubid commander and adventurer
- Sharaf al-Din Fazlullah Qazvini (died 1339), Persian poet and author
- Sharaf al-Din Sati (died 1388), Turkish Mevlevi Hanafi mystic, author, and manuscript producer
- Sharaf Eldin Shiboub (born 1994), Sudanese footballer
- Sharaf al-Din al-Tusi (1135–1213), Persian mathematician and astronomer
- Sharaf al-Din Ali Yazdi (died 1454), Persian historian

=== Sharafadeen ===
- Sharafadeen Alli (born 1963), Nigerian lawyer and politician

=== Sharafuddin ===
- Sharafuddin of Selangor (born 1945), Malaysian Sultan
- Sharafuddin Ashraf (born 1995), Afghan cricketer
- Sharafuddin Lutfillaev (born 1990), Uzbek judoka
- Sharafuddin Taqi, Afghan politician

=== Sharfuddin ===
- Sharfuddin (politician), Indian politician
- Sharfuddin Ahmad (born 1955), Indian politician
- Sharfuddin Ahmed (died 1972), Bangladesh Air Force officer
- Sharfuddin Ahmed Jhantu (1952–2018), Bangladeshi politician
- Sharfuddin Yahya Maneri (1263–1381), Indian Islamic scholar and Sufi saint

=== Şerafettin ===
- Şerafettin Elçi (1938–2012), Turkish politician
- Şerafettin Mağmumi (1860–1931), Ottoman intellectual and physician
- Şerafettin Turpcu (born 1955), Turkish politician
- Şerafettin Yıldız (born 1953), Turkish-Austrian writer and translator

== Surname ==
- Al-Hadi Sharaf ad-Din (1820–1890), claimant for the Zaidi imamate of Yemen
- Sabuncuoğlu Şerafeddin (1385–1468), Ottoman surgeon and physician
