= Ashfaque Hossain Khan =

Former Adviser of Petroleum Ministry of Bangladesh

- আশফাক হোসেন খান

Adviser for Petroleum and Mineral Resources
- In office 12 July 1977 – 29 June 1978
- President: Ziaur Rahman (acting)
- Preceded by: Abdul Gafoor Mahmud
- Succeeded by: A.Z.M. Enayetullah Khan

Ashfaque Hossain Khan (Bengali: আশফাক হোসেন খান) was an adviser for the petroleum ministry, today the Ministry of Power, Energy and Mineral Resources, in the advisory council of President Ziaur Rahman.
