= Halishahar (disambiguation) =

Halishahar is a coastal area in Chittagong. It may refer to:

- Halishahar Thana, a police station in Chittagong City Corporation
- Halishahar Cantonment a Cantonment in Chittagong
