= Muhammad Nurul Anwar =

Major General of Bangladesh Army

- Education: Bangladesh Military Academy
- Military career
- Allegiance: Bangladesh
- Branch: Bangladesh Army
- Service years: 1990–2026
- Rank: Major General
- Service number: BA - 3777
- Unit: Regiment of Artillery
- Commands: Director General of Department of Immigration & Passports; GOC of 55th Infantry Division; Commander of 33rd Artillery Brigade; Commander of 55th Artillery Brigade
- Conflicts: UNIKOM; MONUSCO

Muhammad Nurul Anwar (Note: ndc, hdmc, afwc, psc, G) is a retired two-star officer of the Bangladesh Army. He served as director general of the Department of Immigration & Passports and former commander of the 55th Infantry Division and Jessore area. Anwar is the 10th colonel of the regiment of artillery.

== Education ==
Anwar enlisted in the Bangladesh Military Academy in 1988 and was commissioned in June 1990 in the regiment of artillery. Anwar's parent unit was the 19th Medium Artillery Regiment at Rangpur Cantonment. He is a graduate of the Defence Services Command and Staff College, the Armed Forces War College, and the National Defence College. Anwar completed his gunnery staff course at artillery school at Halishahar Cantonment and obtained his high defence management course from National Defence University.

== Military career ==
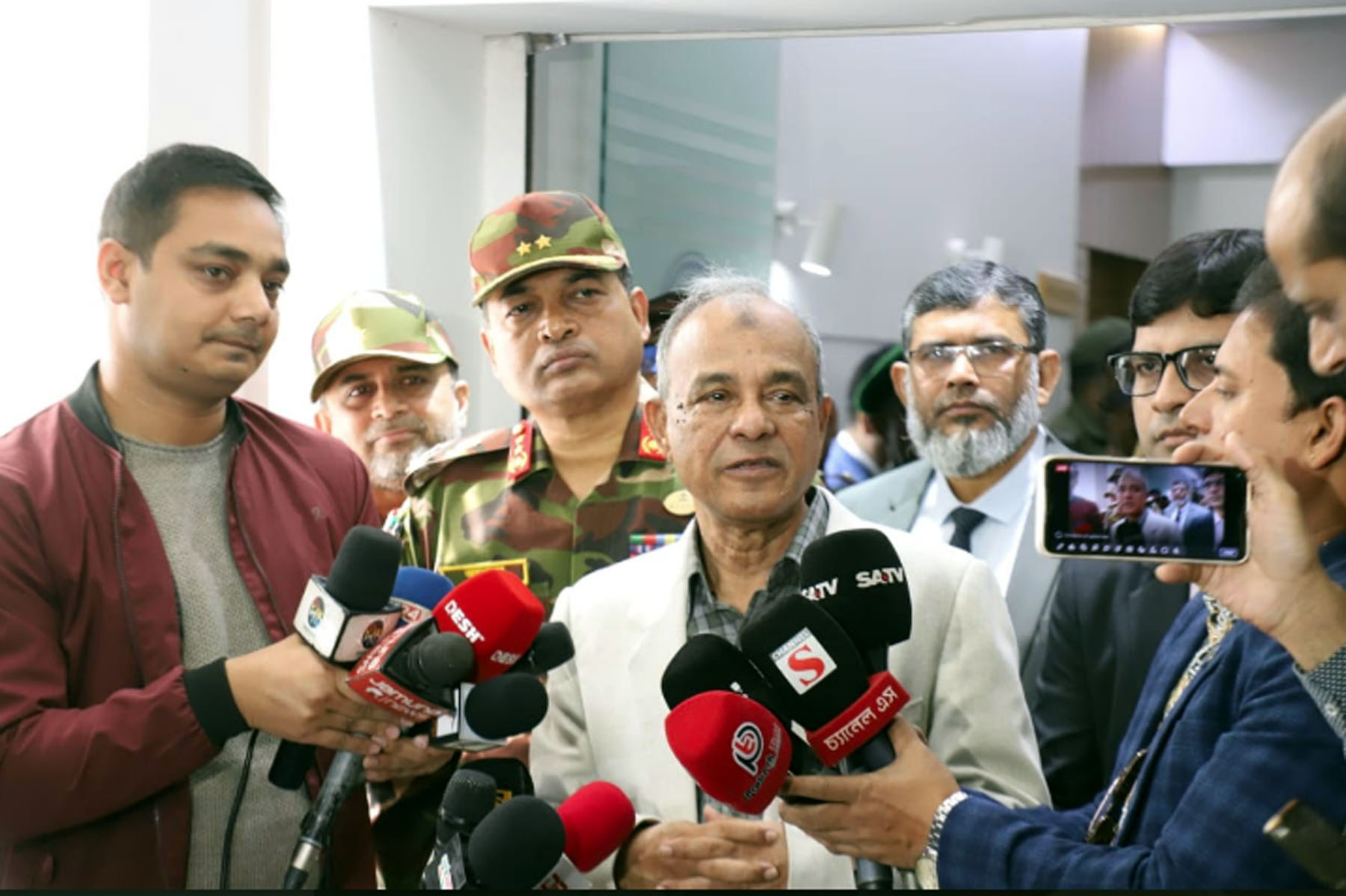
Anwar with Jahangir Alam Chowdhury at a press conference, c. 2025.

Anwar commanded two field artillery batteries, one rocket artillery battery, and one medium artillery regiment. Anwar was also the director general of the Operations and Plan Directorate of the Armed Forces Division. He performed United Nations assignments twice. Once in Kuwait and another time in the Democratic Republic of Congo.

Anwar furthermore served as commander of two artillery brigades and was promoted to major general in 2021. He commanded the 55th Infantry Division, where he was also entitled as chairman of the governing body of Military Collegiate School Khulna and Army Medical College, Jashore. He led Exercise Sampriti-10 a joint training with the Indian Army in Jessore Cantonment.
