= Mushfiqur Rahman (disambiguation) =

Mushfiqur Rahman (born 1980) is a Bangladeshi cricketer.

Mushfiqur Rahman may also refer to:

- Mushfiqur Rahman (politician), Bangladesh Nationalist Party politician and a former member of parliament for Brahmanbaria-4
- G. M. Mushfiqur Rahman (1966–1989), decorated Bangladeshi soldier

== See also ==
- Mushfiqur Rahim, Bangladeshi cricketer
