= Badrul Alam (officer) =

Bangladesh Air Force officer (1948–2023)

- বদরুল আলম
- Born: 13 February 1948; Singair, East Bengal, Pakistan
- Died: 27 October 2023 (aged 75); Dhaka, Bangladesh
- Spouse: Nadera Alam
- Military career
- Allegiance: Pakistan; Bangladesh
- Branch: Pakistan Air Force; Bangladesh Air Force
- Service years: 1968–1980
- Rank: Squadron leader
- Unit: No. 84 Squadron PAF
- Conflicts: Bangladesh Liberation War: Godanail Airstrike
- Awards: Bir Uttom; Independence Day Award
- Other work: Bangladesh Biman

Badrul Alam (13 February 1948 – 27 October 2023) was a squadron leader of the Bangladesh Air Force who fought in the Bangladesh War of Independence, for which the government of Bangladesh gave him the Bir Uttam award, the second highest award for individual gallantry in Bangladesh. In 2016, he received the Independence Day Award.

== Early life and education ==
Although Alam's ancestral home was Char Barai in Singair Upazila of Manikganj District, he grew up in Dhaka. He was the son of father Khandaker Mohammad Badruddoza and mother Hosne Ara Begum. He was married to Nadera Alam, with whom he had a son and daughter. He completed his matriculation from PAF College Lower Topa in 1965. Later he passed HSC during his training in Pakistan Air Force Academy.

== Career ==
He joined the Pakistan Air Force Academy on 22 February 1966. He was commissioned in Pakistan Air Force on 28 January 1968. Until mid-February 1971, he was posted at Sargodha Airbase in Pakistan as a flight lieutenant, after which he was posted to Dhaka. When the war of liberation started, he fled from Dhaka to India in the first half of May. At first, he worked as a staff officer at the Mukti Bahini headquarters, later joining the Bangladesh Air Force when it was formed, and was instrumental in recruiting and training pilots and airmen needed for the Air Force. Besides Godnail, he conducted several other air operations against Pakistani bases and convoys. Alam served in the Bangladesh Air Force until retirement. In 1975, he was sent to force retirement which was effected from March 1980. After retirement he began working for Biman Bangladesh Airlines.

== Contribution to the liberation war of Bangladesh ==
On 3 December 1971, Alam, along with co-pilots Sultan Mahmud and Sahabuddin Ahmed, flew an Alouette helicopter armed with 14 rockets and a machine gun from Dimapur, a hilly area in the Indian state of Nagaland, to strike and destroy a fuel depot of the Pakistan Army situated near Godnail, Narayanganj. They were accompanied by two operators. The Godnail depot supplied fuel for Pakistani ground, naval, and air vehicles. In preparation for an all-out war with India, the Pakistanis stockpiled huge quantities of fuel oil. The guerrillas of the Mukti Bahini tried but failed to damage the depot due to heavy security. He and his team were successful in destroying that oil depot.

== Death ==
Badrul Alam died on 27 October 2023, at the age of 75.
