= Mahbubur Rahman (army officer, died 1981) =

Bir Uttom Recipient

Mahbubur Rahman Bir Uttam
- মেহবুবুর রহমান
- Born: Begumganj, Noakhali, East Bengal, Dominion of Pakistan
- Died: 1 or 2 June 1981; Chittagong, Bangladesh
- Military career
- Allegiance: Bangladesh
- Branch: Bangladesh Army
- Service years: 1971–1981
- Rank: Lieutenant Colonel
- Unit: East Bengal Regiment
- Conflicts: Bangladesh Liberation War
- Awards: Bir Uttam

Mahbubur Rahman (died 1 or 2 June 1981) was a Bangladeshi army officer and decorated war hero of the Bangladesh Liberation War. He was awarded the title of Bir Uttam, the second-highest gallantry award in Bangladesh.

== Early life ==
Rahman was born in Banabaria village in Begumganj Upazila, Noakhali District. His father was Mustafizur Rahman and his mother was Lutfunnahar.

== Career ==
Rahman served in the Pakistan Army as a lieutenant in the 4th East Bengal Regiment. When the Bangladesh Liberation War broke out in 1971, he joined the fight for Bangladesh's independence.

He played a significant role in Sector 2 of the Mukti Bahini, specifically in the Nirvoypur sub-sector. He led several successful guerrilla operations against the Pakistan Army, including key battles in Comilla's Jagmohanpur, Dhanapur, Razar Mar Dighi, Phultali, and Chandpur's Hajiganj and Ashikati.

One of his most notable operations took place in August 1971, when he led an ambush on a Pakistani army camp in Miabazar, Comilla. The surprise attack forced the enemy to retreat. In October, he led two more raids on Pakistani camps in the same area, killing many enemy soldiers and disrupting their movements along the Comilla-Chittagong route. His actions made him a feared figure among enemy forces.

For his actions, Rahman was awarded the title of Bir Uttam. According to the 1973 government gazette, his gallantry number was 20.

== Death ==
Rahman was killed in Chittagong on either 1 or 2 June 1981, following the assassination of President Ziaur Rahman. At the time, he was a lieutenant colonel of the Bangladesh Army, and his uncle was General Muhammad Abul Manzur, the alleged mastermind of the assassination. He was unmarried at the time of his death.
