= Akram Ahmed =

Akram Ahmed BU
- আকরাম আহমেদ

Personal details
- Born: January 7, 1946 Jashore, Bengal Presidency, British India
- Died: December 7, 2020 (aged 74) Combined Military Hospital, Dhaka
- Resting place: Banani graveyard, Dhaka
- Citizenship: Pakistan (before 1971); Bangladesh
- Awards: Bir Uttom

Military service
- Allegiance: Bangladesh
- Branch/service: Bangladesh Air Force
- Rank: Captain
- Battles/wars: Bangladesh Liberation War

Akram Ahmed, BU (7 January 1946 – 7 December 2020) was a veteran of the Bangladesh Liberation War as a pilot as part of Operation Kilo Flight, the beginning of the Bangladesh Air Force. For his bravery in the war, the government of Bangladesh awarded him the title of Bir Uttom, one of a few civilians to have received the award.

== Early life ==
Akram Ahmed was born on 09 January 1946 in an aristocratic Bengali Muslim family in Jashore. In 1967, he was licensed as a commercial pilot. In April 1968, he joined Pakistan International Airlines as a pilot. He left for India on 07 April 1971 to participate in the War of Liberation.

== Career ==
In 1971, Akram Ahmed worked in the East Pakistan Plant Protection Directorate. At that time, the Plant Protection Directorate had its own crop duster to control insects. When the Bangladesh Liberation War started, he fled from Dhaka to India in May. There he met Khaled Musharraf and expressed interest in taking part in the ground war. Khaled Musharraf told him to stay in Agartala for some time. A few months later, the air wing of Mukti Bahini was formed. Ahmed took part in about 12 took part in the attack.

After midnight on 2 December 1971, Ahmed flew a small plane from an Indian airport to Bangladesh. He was accompanied by Shamsul Alam. Their target was the oil depot in Chittagong Port. They arrived at their target after flying for about three hours. They successfully bombed the airport with no navigation equipment except a compass.

After the Bangladesh Liberation War ended, Ahmed joined Bangladesh Biman, the national airline of Bangladesh. He was active in the Nirmul Committee.

Ahmed worked as a senior consultant for the Civil Aviation Authority of Bangladesh.

== Death ==
Ahmed died on 7 December 2020, at the Combined Military Hospital in Dhaka. He was hospitalized with pneumonia after catching COVID-19 during the COVID-19 pandemic in Bangladesh. He was buried in Banani graveyard with a guard of honor provided by the Bangladesh Air Force.
