= Mozahar Ullah =

Bangladesh Liberation War veteran and naval commando

- মোজাহার উল্লাহ্
- Born: Bhaluka, Mirsharai Upazila, Chittagong District, East Pakistan
- Died: 2008
- Military career
- Allegiance: Bangladesh
- Branch: Mukti Bahini
- Service years: 1971
- Rank: Naval Commando
- Conflicts: Bangladesh Liberation War
- Awards: Bir Uttom

Mozahar Ullah (died 2008) was a veteran of the Bangladesh Liberation War and naval commando who was awarded the Bir Uttom, the second-highest gallantry award of Bangladesh, for his contribution to the Bangladesh Liberation War of 1971.

== Career ==
Ullah was working in a private insurance company in Karachi, West Pakistan, in 1971. During a visit to his home in East Pakistan, the Bangladesh Liberation War broke out. He joined the resistance in Chittagong. After the initial phase of resistance, he went to India and joined the naval wing of the Mukti Bahini.

Ullah was one of the leaders of a daring naval commando operation at Chittagong Port on the night of 15–16 August 1971. A total of 61 naval commandos had gathered in Chittagong, divided into three teams with Ullah leading one of the teams. They carried heavy loads of about 20 kg each, including limpet mines, fins, grenades, and food, part of the way on foot from India. On the night of the operation, the teams swam across the Karnaphuli River to plant mines on targeted ships and barges. Despite torrential rain and heavy security, the commandos successfully mined multiple targets. Around ten enemy ships and installations were either destroyed or severely damaged. These included MV Al Abbas, MV Hormuz, two navy gunboats, the barge Orient, and several others.

Ullah remained onshore during the mission to provide cover and support. The operation was considered one of the most successful sabotage missions of the naval commandos during the war. Due to his involvement in the war, the Pakistani army detained and killed his father, Ali Azam. Their family home was also burned down. After the war, he resumed his career in the insurance sector.

== Personal life ==
Ullah's ancestral home is in Bhaluka village, Mirsarai Upazila, Chittagong District. He was married to Del Afroz, and they had one son and four daughters. His mother's name was Khairunnesa.

== Death and legacy ==
Ullah died in 2008 after a prolonged illness. According to his family, he did not receive adequate medical care during his illness. His wife, Del Afroz, has publicly appealed for a location or structure in Chittagong to be named in his honor.
