= Sharfuddin Ahmed =

Founder of Bangladesh Air Force

Sharafuddin Ahmed
- Native name: শরফুদ্দিন আহমেদ
- Born: Sultanpur, Kumarkhali, Kushtia, Bangladesh
- Allegiance: Bangladesh
- Branch: Bangladesh Air Force
- Service years: 1971–1972
- Conflicts: Bangladesh Liberation War
- Awards: Bir Uttam

Sharafuddin Ahmed was a founding officer of the Bangladesh Air Force and recipient of Bir Uttom, the second-highest gallantry award of Bangladesh, for his service during Operation Kilo Flight of the Bangladesh Liberation War.

== Early life ==
Ahmed was born in Sultanpur village of Kumarkhali, Kushtia District. His father, Shamsul Alam, was a lawyer, and his mother, Hasina Begum, was a homemaker. He completed his education to the Secondary School Certificate level.

== Career ==
Sharafuddin joined the Pakistan Army but left on 5 May 1971 to join the Bangladesh Liberation War. Later, during the war, he became part of the newly formed Bangladesh Air Force, operating from the Dimapur Air Base in Assam, India. Bangladesh Air Force was organised under Air Commodore A.K. Khondaker. He carried out bombing raids with Indian donated aircraft against the Pakistan Army during the war as part of the Operation Kilo Flight.

== Death ==
Sharafuddin died in a plane crash in Dhaka, Bangladesh in 1972.
