= Anjuman Ara Jamil =

Bangladeshi politician

Member of Parliament
- In office 14 July 1996 – 13 July 2001
- Constituency: Women's Seat-8

Personal details
- Born: 1938 Hashimpur, Kushtia
- Died: 29 November 2012 (aged 73–74)

Anjuman Ara Jamil was a former member of parliament and the widow of Brigadier General Jamil Uddin Ahmad.

== Early life ==
Anjuman Ara Jamil was born in Hashimpur, Kushtia in 1938. She married Jamil Uddin Ahmad. She was elected to parliament from Kushtia.

== Death ==
She died on 29 November 2012 from "old-age complications". She was buried in Dhaka Cantonment Graveyard.
