= Sultan Mahmud (air officer) =

Bangladeshi Air Force Officer (1944–2023)

- সুলতান মাহমুদ

Minister of Industries
- In office 1 June 1984 – 9 July 1986
- Prime Minister: Ataur Rahman Khan; Mizanur Rahman Chowdhury
- Preceded by: SM Shafiul Azam
- Succeeded by: Moudud Ahmed

6th Chief of Air Staff
- In office 23 July 1981 – 22 July 1987
- President: Abdus Sattar; A. F. M. Ahsanuddin Chowdhury; Hussain Muhammad Ershad
- Prime Minister: Shah Azizur Rahman; Ataur Rahman Khan; Mizanur Rahman Chowdhury
- Preceded by: Sadruddin Mohammad Hossain
- Succeeded by: Momtaz Uddin Ahmed

Personal details
- Born: 2 May 1942 Feni, Bengal, British India
- Died: 14 August 2023 (aged 81) Dhaka, Bangladesh
- Awards: Bir Uttom; Independence Day Award

Military service
- Allegiance: Pakistan (Before 1971); Bangladesh
- Branch/service: Pakistan Air Force; Bangladesh Air Force
- Years of service: 1962-1987
- Rank: Air Vice Marshal
- Unit: No. 6 Squadron PAF
- Commands: AOC of BAF Base Bashar; AOC of BAF Base Matiur Rahman; Director (Administration) at Air Headquarters; Director (Operations) at Air Headquarters
- Battles/wars: Bangladesh Liberation War

Air Vice Marshal Sultan Mahmud, Bir Uttom (2 May 1942 – 14 August 2023) was a former chief of the Bangladesh Air Force and a former deputy chief martial law administrator. As a member of Kilo Flight, he was one of the founders of Bangladesh's Air Force. He later served as the Minister of Industries. He received the Independence Award from the Government of Bangladesh in 2018.

== Early life and education ==
He was born on 2 May 1942 in Feni. He obtained his primary education from Armanitola Government High School. Later he was admitted to PAF College Sargodha. He completed his matriculation and Senior Cambridge from PAF College Sargodha in 1958 and in 1960 respectively. He joined the Pakistan Air Force as Cadet in 1960.

== Career ==
He joined the Pakistan Air Force on 19 August 1960. He was commissioned in the Pakistan Air Force on 1 July 1962. In 1971 he was posted to Karachi. In May 1971 he left Karachi to join the liberation war and went to Dhaka. After the independence he served in Bangladesh Air Force. He served as the commanding officer of BAF Bashar and BAF Matiur Rahman. He also served as the commandant of Bangladesh Air Force Academy and as director (operations) at BAF HQ. Mahmud was chief of the Bangladesh Air Force from 23 July 1981 to 22 July 1987. On 24 March 1982, he was appointed deputy chief martial law administrator by President Hussain Mohammad Ershad. On 1 June 1986, he was placed in charge of the Ministry of Industries. In 1992 he was charged with corruption after the government of President Hussain Mohammad Ershad relinquished power. He was acquitted of these charges 24 years later.

== Personal life ==
He was married to Ferdaus Ara Mahmud. They have a son and a daughter.

== Awards and decorations ==

Independence Day Award (Independence Day Award )	Bir Uttom (Bir Uttom)	Nirapattya Padak (Nirapattya Padak)	Rono Taroka (Rono Taroka)
Samar Padak (Samar Padak)	Mukti Taroka (Mukti Taroka)	Joy Padak (Joy Padak)	Songbidhan Padak (Songbidhan Padak)
Jesthata Padak II (Jesthata Padak II)	Jesthata Padak I (Jesthata Padak I)	Sitara-e-Harb 1965 War (War Star 1965)	Tamgha-e-Jang 1965 War (War Medal 1965)

== Death ==
Sultan Mahmud died in Dhaka on 14 August 2023, at the age of 81.

Military offices
Preceded by Air Vice Marshal Sadruddin Mohammad Hossain	Chief of Air Staff; 1981 – 1987	Succeeded by Air Vice Marshal Momtaz Uddin Ahmed
