= Shamsul Alam (Bir Uttam) =

Bangladeshi Air Force pilot (1947–2022)

- শামসুল আলম
- Born: 9 July 1947; Baufal, East Bengal, Pakistan
- Died: 8 December 2022 (aged 75); Dhaka, Bangladesh
- Military career
- Allegiance: Bangladesh; Pakistan (Before 1971)
- Branch: Bangladesh Air Force; Pakistan Air Force
- Service years: 1967-1984
- Rank: Group Captain
- Unit: No. 5 Squadron
- Commands: Sub-Commander of Sector – I; AOC of BAF Base Jessore; Commandant of Bangladesh Air Force Academy
- Conflicts: Bangladesh Liberation War: Operation Kilo Flight
- Awards: Bir Uttom

Shamsul Alam (18 August 1947 – 8 December 2022) was a veteran of Bangladesh Liberation war. For his bravery during Operation Kilo Flight the government of Bangladesh awarded him the title of Bir Uttom. He was awarded the Independence Day Award in 2017.

== Early life ==
Alam was born on 9 July 1947 in Patilapara, Baufal Upazila, Patuakhali District.

== Career ==
Alam joined Pakistan Air Force and was stationed in Rawalpindi, West Pakistan (now Pakistan) in 1971. When the Bangladesh Liberation war started, he kept looking for opportunities to join it. He came to Dhaka to join the war. He was immediately detained in Dhaka.

In August–September 1971, the Pakistani government announced a general amnesty for the detainees. Alam was released in the first week of September. A few days later he fled from Dhaka to India and joined the war. At that time the process of formation of the air wing of the Mukti Bahini had just started in India. He was included in the wing. Their training started a few days later. After a few weeks of training in Dimapur, Nagaland, he mastered the art of throwing bombs, rockets, etc. at the right targets with the help of civilian aircraft. Shamsul Alam operated at the Eastern Refinery in Chittagong. From Kamalpur, India, he and Akram Ahmed set off for Chittagong on an Otter plane in Operation Kilo Flight. The aircraft had no modern directional equipment other than a fork-compass.

Alam and Akram Ahmed flew along the coastline of Chittagong and reached the oil refineries of the Eastern Refinery in time. The scheduled time of the attack was midnight. The bombs were dropped one minute past midnight. The attack left oil depots around the Eastern Refinery on fire.

After the Independence of Bangladesh, he served in the Bangladesh Air Force. He established a number of institutions of the Air Force including Flying Training Academy.

== Death and legacy ==
Group Captain (Retd.) Shamsul Alam died on 8 December 2022 in a private medical. His sons, Hasan Mahmud Khan, an Awami League politician, and Shamsuddin Ahmed Riyadh, were accused in a murder case after the fall of the Sheikh Hasina led Awami League government. The plaintiff wanted to accuse four but the lawyer changed it to more than 2000 accused including Talukder who was in Canada at the time of the murder.
