= Momtaz Uddin Ahmed =

Mumtaz Uddin Ahmed

Chief of Air Staff
- In office 23 July 1987 – 4 June 1991
- President: Hussain Muhammad Ershad; Shahabuddin Ahmed (acting)
- Preceded by: Sultan Mahmud
- Succeeded by: Altaf Hossain Chowdhury

Military service
- Allegiance: Bangladesh
- Branch/service: Bangladesh Air Force
- Rank: Air Vice Marshal

Mumtaz Uddin Ahmed was a Bangladesh Air Force officer who served as chief of air staff from 1987 to 1991.

== Career ==
Ahmed became the chief of air staff on 23 July 1987. It was on his watch that the April 1991 Bangladesh cyclone badly damaged 44 Bangladeshi military planes and helicopters. The leader of the opposition, Sheikh Hasina, blamed the government for failing to take measures in advance to protect the craft. After an inquiry, President Shahabuddin Ahmed dismissed Mumtaz Uddin Ahmed on 4 June 1991. The president appointed Air Commodore Altaf Hossain Chowdhury to replace him.

Military offices
Preceded by Air Vice Marshal Sultan Mahmud	Chief of Air Staff; 1987 – 1991	Succeeded by Air Vice Marshal Altaf Hossain Chowdhury
