= Mujib Battery =

First artillery unit of the Bangladesh Army during the Liberation War of 1971

Mujib Battery was the first artillery unit formed under the command of the Mukti Bahini during the Bangladesh Liberation War in 1971. It played a pivotal role in supporting the Mukti Bahini during operations against the Pakistan Army. It was named in honor of Sheikh Mujibur Rahman, the founding president of Bangladesh.

== History ==
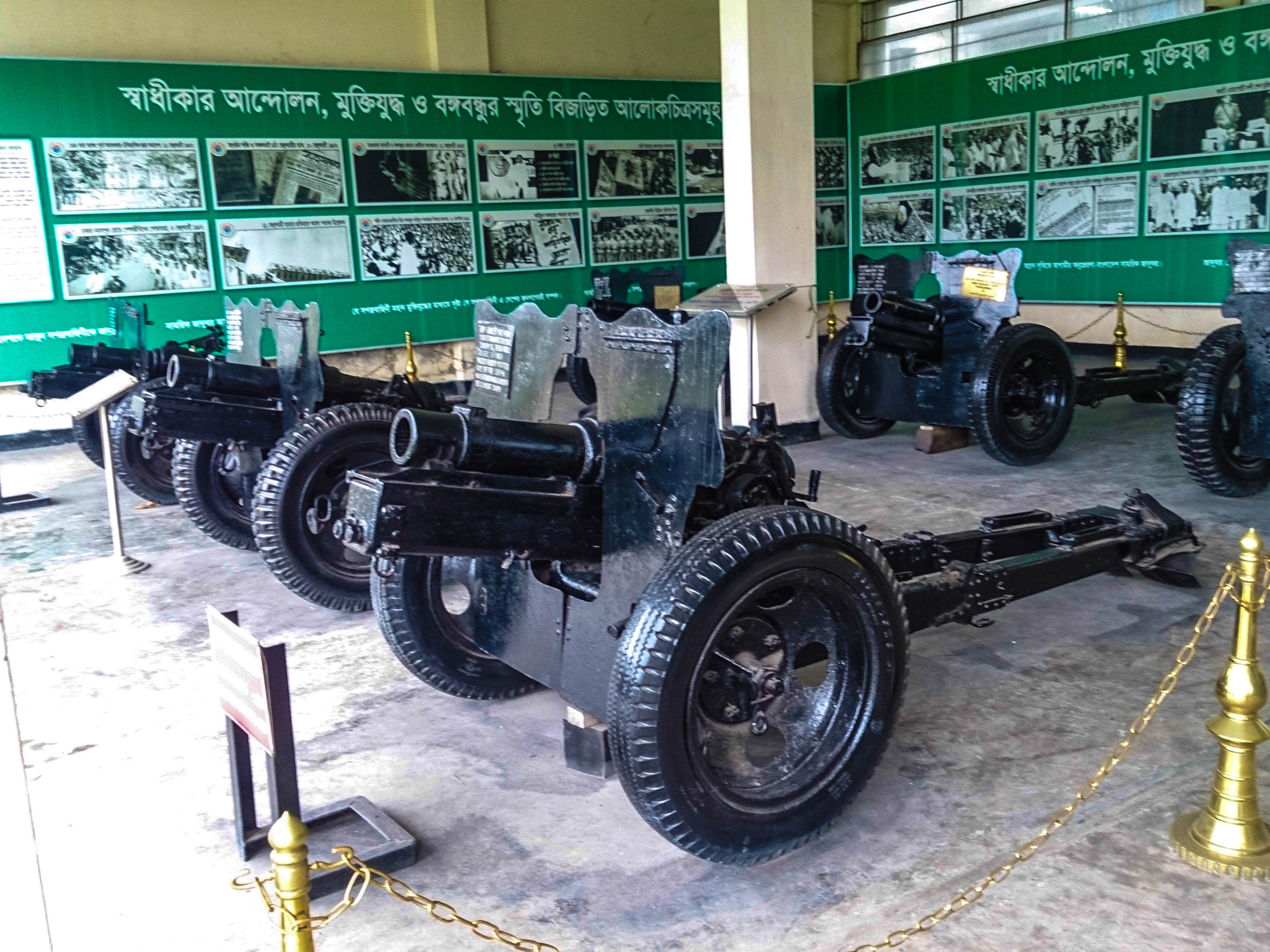
Artillery from Mujib Battery at the Bangladesh Military Museum

Mujib Battery was established on 22 July 1971 in Konaban, Tripura, India. The unit was initially equipped with six 3.7-inch howitzers, two of which were provided by the Indian Army. The artillery unit operated under the command of the "K Force" led by Major Khaled Mosharraf and was deployed primarily in Sector-2 of the battlefield. The first commander of Mujib Battery was Captain Abdul Aziz Pasha and later by Captain Anwarul Alam and Captain Mohammad Abdul Gaffar Halder.

The formation of the Mujib Battery marked a significant development in the Bangladesh Liberation War, as it provided much-needed artillery support to freedom fighters who were otherwise limited in terms of heavy weaponry. It served under major Abu Salek Chowdhury in an operation to capture Saldanodi Railway Station. As part of K Force, it provided artillery support for ground operations in eastern sectors of the conflict, particularly in areas near the Indian border and inside Bangladesh, including Feni and adjacent regions. It provided artillery support to the 9th East Bengal Regiment during the battle to capture Kasba. It served under the end stages of the war under Brigadier General Anand Sarup of the Indian Army and fought to liberate Feni in December 1971.

In 1975, Mujib Battery, led by Colonel Sayed Farooq-ur-Rahman was one the units which participated in the Assassination of Sheikh Mujibur Rahman, president of Bangladesh, in 1975.

== Legacy ==
The Mujib Battery is the origin of the Artillery Corps of Bangladesh Army.

In June 2011, the Government of India returned two of the original howitzers used by Mujib Battery as a goodwill gesture. The cannons entered Bangladesh through the Benapole land port and were received by a 15-member Bangladesh Army team led by Major Morshed of the Jessore Cantonment. A 12-member delegation of the Indian Army, headed by Major Ariar, facilitated the handover.

In April 2024, Prime Minister Sheikh Hasina inaugurated the Bangabandhu Sheikh Mujib Battery Complex at the Bangladesh Army Artillery Centre and School at Halishahar, Chittagong. A documentary on the Mujub Battery was screened at the event. After the fall of the Sheikh Hasina led Awami League government, the Bangabandhu Sheikh Mujib Battery Complex was renamed to Artillery Centre and School.
