= S. M. Imdadul Hoque =

Saleh Mohammad Imdadul Hoque
- সালেহ মোহাম্মদ ইমদাদুল হক
- Born: January 17, 1949; Jessore, East Bengal, Pakistan
- Died: 6 November 1971 (aged 22); Sylhet, Chittagong, Bangladesh
- Military career
- Allegiance: Pakistan (before 1971); Bangladesh
- Branch: Pakistan Air Force (before 1970); Pakistan Army; Bangladesh Army
- Service years: 1964-1971
- Rank: Corporal (Pakistan); Second Lieutenant (Bangladesh)
- Unit: East Bengal Regiment
- Conflicts: Indo-Pakistani War of 1965; Bangladesh Liberation War †
- Awards: Bir Uttom

S. M. Imdadul Hoque was a Bangladesh Army officer who fought and died in the Bangladesh Liberation war. He was posthumously awarded Bir Uttom, the second highest military honor in Bangladesh.

== Early life ==
Hoque was born in Parnakanda, Jessore, East Bengal, Pakistan, on 17 January 1949. He finished his Secondary School Certificate (SSC) in 1963 and in 1964 he enlisted in the Pakistan Air Force.

== Career ==
Hoque fought in the 1965 India-Pakistan War while stationed in the PAF Base Kohat. On 8 September 1966, he was promoted to corporal. while still in service he finished his Higher Secondary School Certificate (HSC) in 1968. On 14 May 1970, he joined the Pakistan Military Academy as an army officer cadet. The Bangladesh Liberation war started on 25 March 1971, he secretly left the academy soon after to join the war. He was appointed in the 8 East Bengal Regiment as the commander of C company. He led an attack in Sagarnal tea garden, Sylhet, on the Pakistan Army on 15 October 1971. The Pakistan Army machine gun post was destroyed and the army was forced to retreat.

== Death ==
Hoque led an attack on the Dhamai tea garden Pakistan Army camp on 6 November 1971. The Mukti Bahini under his command could not advance due to the machine gun fire from Pakistan Army. He crawled towards the machine gun post bunker with a grenade. He threw the grenade from a close range into the bunker. He died from a bullet wound while fighting. He was posthumously awarded Bir Uttom and commissioned into Bangladesh Army.
