= Quazi Sazzad Ali Zahir =

Veteran of the Bangladesh Liberation War

- কাজী সাজ্জাদ আলী জহির
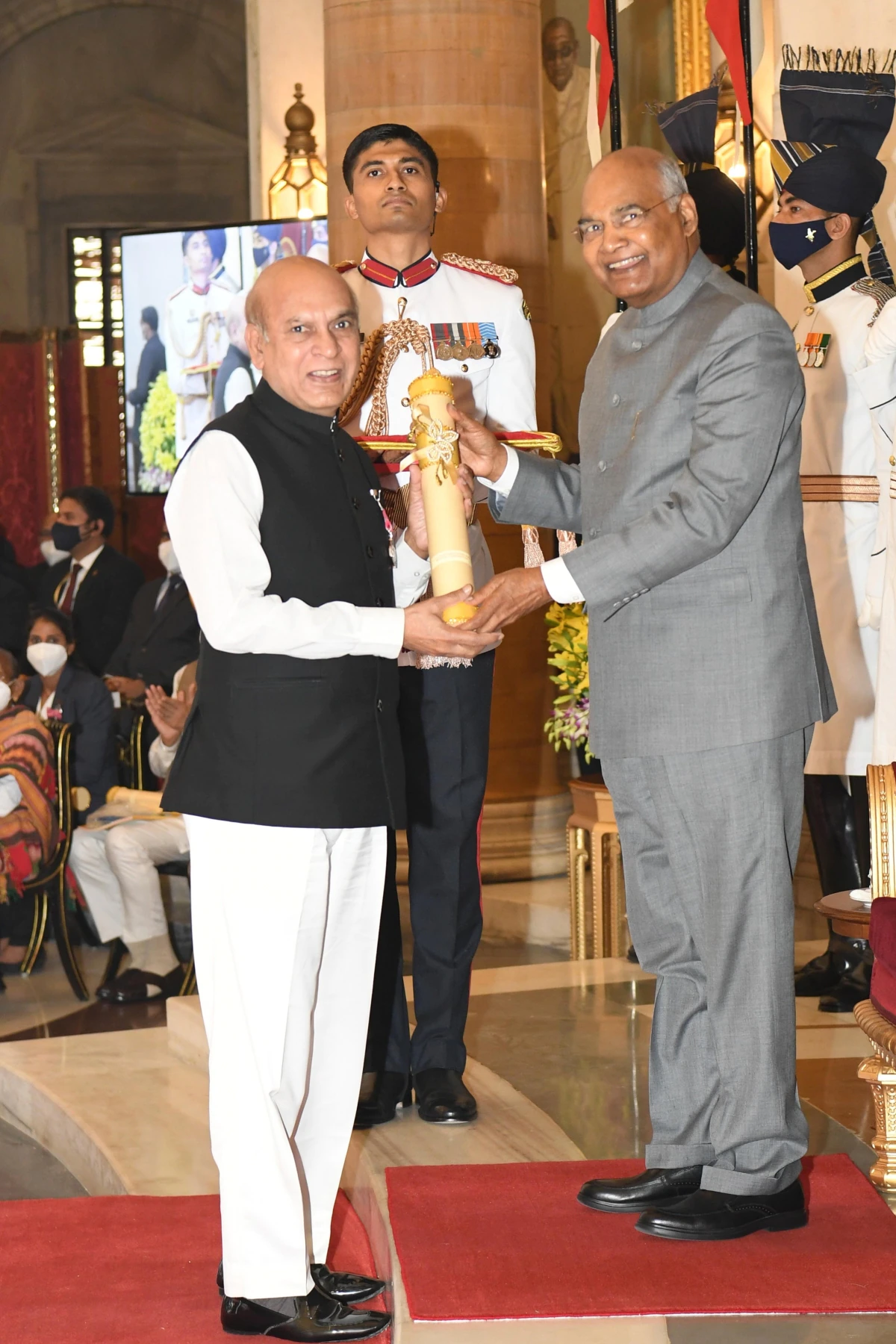
- Lt Col. Zahir receiving Padma Shri award from Indian President Ram Nath Kovind
- Born: 11 April 1951 (age 75); Daudkandi, East Bengal, Pakistan
- Military career
- Allegiance: Pakistan (Before 1971); Bangladesh
- Branch: Pakistan Army; Bangladesh Army
- Service years: 1971-1982
- Rank: Lieutenant Colonel
- Unit: Regiment of Artillery
- Commands: Company Commander of Z Force; Battery Commander of 2nd Field Artillery Battery; 2IC of 6th Field Artillery Regiment; CO of 12th Field Artillery Regiment; Instructor of Artillery Centre and School
- Conflicts: Bangladesh Liberation War
- Awards: Independence Award; Bir Protik; Padma Shri

Quazi Sazzad Ali Zahir (born 11 April 1951) is a veteran of the Bangladesh Liberation War. The Bangladesh government awarded him the Bir Protik gallantry award for his bravery in the war. He was conferred with the Independence Award, Bangladesh's highest civilian award, in 2013 and India's fourth highest civilian award, the Padma Shri, on 9 November 2021.

== Early life ==
Zaheer was born on 11 April 1951 in Chausai, Tipperah district, East Bengal, Dominion of Pakistan (now in Daudkandi Upazila, Comilla District, Bangladesh).

== Career ==
Zahir joined the Pakistan Army at the end of 1969 as a cadet. In 1971, he was training as a senior cadet at the Kakul Military Academy in Pakistan. Zahir was commissioned in the Artillery Corps of the Pakistan Army in August. He was posted to the 6th Field Artillery Regiment Sialkot. In 1971, he was an officer in the Pakistan Army and posted to 14 Para Brigade in Sialkot. When the Bangladesh Liberation War started, he fled from Pakistan at the end of August and came to India to join the war. He crossed the border with Pak Army deployment maps stuffed inside his boots and Rs. 20 in his pocket. Initially he was considered to be a Pakistani spy sent to distract the Indian Army prior to the launch of an invasion. He was interrogated by Indian Army officials before being taken to Pathankot for further grilling. Here he produced maps of troop deployments across the border. When it was established that he was not a spy but was a Pak defector who wanted to help with the war effort, he was sent to Delhi and lodged in a safe house for a further period of 9 months.

=== 1971 Liberation War of Bangladesh ===
Zahir joined the Bangladesh Liberation War in September 1971. He organized the 2nd Artillery Force under Sector 4 in the Sylhet region. At that time the Indian government gave six 105 mm artillery pieces to the Mukti Bahini, and with that a field artillery battery was formed for the Mukti Bahini. It is named Raushan Ara Battery. He was the co-captain of this group. Since October, the battery had assisted the Mukti Bahini Z Force in the greater Sylhet region with artillery fire support in various battles. He participated in the battles of Borolekha, Shamshernagar, Monglabazar, Juri, Kulaura, Fenchuganj, Sylhet town, etc., and took part in a number of operations along with the Indian battalions during the war. He raised 2 field batteries of artillery and operated as a forward observer in the battlefield.

=== Military career ===
For his valour in the battles, he was awarded the ‘Bir Protik’ gallantry award. He was awarded the Chief of Army Staff commendation two times for his excellent performance in training courses in India, the UK, and the US. He was the chief instructor of the Corps of Artillery and a staff officer in the Army Headquarters.

In 2013, Zahir was awarded the Bangladesh Independence Award, the highest civilian award, for his contribution to the liberation war.

Zahir approached Prime Minister Sheikh Hasina to provide awards and recognition to Indian soldiers killed in the Bangladesh Liberation War. He is co-coordinating the project with the government of Bangladesh to provide crests to Indian soldiers killed in the war. He founded Shuddhoi Muktijoddho to provide recognition to tribal veterans of the Bangladesh Liberation War.

He has been awarded Padma Shri for his contribution in the field of Public Affairs on 2021 by the president of India Shri Ramnath Kovind.

=== Academic career ===
After the liberation war, he has been at the vanguard of educating the next generation about all that happened during those turbulent years, during which millions of Bangladeshi patriots were tortured and sacrificed their lives for the sake of freedom. Among his other accomplishments, he pioneered the concept of producing graphic novels for children, focusing on the Mukti Joddhas' martyrdom and the Indian Army's role in the liberation of Bangladesh. He delivers lectures in universities and institutes abroad like CLAWS, India Foundation, Vivekananda Foundation, Jawaharlal Nehru University, Vidysagar University, Burdwan University, American University (Washington DC), Maryland University (Maryland), etc. He is a Faculty Member in the Department of Sociology of East West University where he is teaching the subject ‘Emergence of Bangladesh’.

=== Writings ===
He has authored 63 books and a large number of articles in Bangla and English newspapers and periodicals in Bangladesh and abroad on Liberation War, war crime and genocide committed by Pakistan Army and their collaborators in 1971. He researched and presented more than 1,700 episodes of television and radio programmes in various channels, winning best TV documentary award ‘Bazlur Rahman Memorial Award’ in 2011. These episodes revolved around mainly on Liberation War, war crime and genocide committed by Pakistan Army and their collaborators in 1971.

He is delivering lectures for Bangabandhu Memorial Trust on Liberation War, contribution of Bangabandhu, war crime and genocide, and anti-fundamentalism/anti-radicalization for last 11 years. He is teaching in institutes including Foreign Service Academy, Judicial Academy, BPATC, BIAM, Admin Academy, BBTA, BIBM, NDC (AFWC), DSCSC, Police Staff College, Social Welfare Training Academy, Youth Academy, Disaster Management Academy, Islamic academies, etc. on the subject of background and spirit of Liberation War, war crime and genocide.

He researched, documented and wrote citation of Friends of Bangladesh who were honoured in 9 phases which included 248 Indian citizens who had great contribution in the Liberation of Bangladesh. He perceived the concept and has been entrusted for implementing the project of honouring every Indian martyred soldier. He documented and conducted the programme and read out the citations of Indian martyrs in the ceremony held in New Delhi on 8 April 2017 and 16 December 2018 in Calcutta. He also perceived the concept of awarding Mujib Scholarship to Indian officers/soldiers inheritance and the process is ongoing.

He worked as editor of CLAWS (New Delhi) and worked for publication of 2 volumes on 1971 Liberation War. This idea was proposed to CLAWS by him and was the first effort in writing history together by war heroes of both countries. He was the Project Director and Executive Editor of Bangladesh Army History Project and completed writing of History of Bangladesh Army from 1948 to 2013 (5 volumes) and also edited Battles of 1971 (7 volumes).

== Awards and honours ==
- – Bir Protik Award, fourth highest gallantry award in Bangladesh.
- – Swadhinata Padak in 2013, highest civilian award in Bangladesh.
- – Padma Shri in 2021, fourth highest civilian award in India,
