= Khademul Bashar =

Bangladeshi air force officer

Khademul Bashar BU, TBt

3rd Chief of Air Staff
- In office 1 May 1976 – 1 September 1976
- President: Abu Sadat Mohammad Sayem
- Prime Minister: None
- Preceded by: Muhammad Ghulam Tawab
- Succeeded by: Abdul Gafoor Mahmud

Personal details
- Born: 1 September 1935 Bogra, Bengal, British India
- Died: 1 September 1976 (aged 41) Tejgaon, Dhaka, Bangladesh
- Awards: Bir Uttom; Tamgha-i-Basalat

Military service
- Allegiance: Bangladesh; Pakistan (Before 1971)
- Branch/service: Bangladesh Air Force; Pakistan Air Force
- Years of service: 1956-1976
- Rank: Air Vice-Marshal
- Unit: No.16 Squadron
- Commands: Commander of Sector – VI; AOC of BAF Base Tejgaon; Chief of Air Staff
- Battles/wars: Bangladesh Liberation War; Indo-Pakistani War of 1965

M Khademul Bashar, BU, psc (1 September 1935 – 1 September 1976) was a two star air officer who served as chief of air staff of the Bangladesh Air Force in 1976. He also held the office of deputy chief martial law administrator and was in charge of the Ministry of Petroleum, the Ministry of Food and Civil Aviation, and the Department of Tourism.

== Early life ==
Khademul Bashar was born in Bogra on 1 September 1935. He passed his matriculation from Satkhira Prananath High School and intermediate from Rajshahi College. He joined the Pakistan Air Force as a flight cadet in 1954.

== Career ==
Bashar enlisted in the Pakistan Air Force Academy in 1954 and was commissioned on general duties (pilot) on 17 June 1956. His initial parent unit was No. 16 Squadron. Before his repatriation, he served in different capacities, such as second in command of No. 7 Squadron and No. 25 Squadron. In 1960 he was posted to Dhaka Air Base as the flight safety officer. He served as the commanding officer of No. 8 Squadron and No. 406 Squadron of the Pakistan Air Force. He was promoted to the rank of wing commander in 1970 and was posted as a staff officer at then PAF Base Tejgaon. He was a senior operations officer of Tejgaon Air Base until 27 March 1971. He was awarded Tamgha-i-Basalat for the 1965 War.

Bashar, Group Captain A. K. Khandker, and several other East Pakistani pilots defected in May 1971 and escaped to India. He was one of only two air force officers during the Bangladesh Liberation War and was designated Mukti Bahini Commander Sector 6. Later on November 3, General M.A.G Osmani designated Muhammad Hamidullah Khan as commander of Sector 6.

After the independence of Bangladesh, Bashar was promoted to the rank of group captain in February 1972 and initially served in the army for establishing the 72nd Independent Infantry Brigade as deputy of Colonel Chitta Ranjan Dutta. He was then designated as air officer commanding the BAF Base Tejgaon. In October 1973, he was promoted to the rank of air commodore and returned to newly formed Air Headquarters as assistant chief of air staff (operations and training) and provost marshal. Bashar was then promoted to air vice marshal and was appointed the chief of air staff of the Bangladesh Air Force on 1 May 1976. On 3 May 1976 he was promoted to air vice-marshal. Within his truncated tenure, Bashar inaugurated the first two Shenyang J-6 squadrons (No. 5 squadron & No. 8 squadron) of the Bangladesh Air Force.

== Death and legacy ==
Khademul Bashar died on 1 September 1976 in an air crash. He was attending the inauguration of the Flying Instructors School at Tejgaon in Dhaka on an Air Tourer. On its maiden flight, an NZAI Air Tourer rolled over and crashed nose down into the airfield. Both the pilot, Squadron Leader Mofizul Haq, and Bashar were killed instantly.

The BAF base at Tejgaon, Dhaka, has been renamed Base Bashar in his honour.

Military offices
Preceded by Air Vice Marshal M. G. Tawab	Chief Of Air Staff; 1976	Succeeded by Air Vice Marshal Abdul Gafoor Mahmud
