= Abdus Salek Choudhury =

Recipient of Bir Uttam and Freedom Fighter

- আবদুস সালেক চৌধুরী
- Born: 20 September 1946; Dohar, Bengal, British India
- Died: 19 November 1972 (aged 26)
- Military career
- Allegiance: Pakistan (Before 1971); Bangladesh
- Branch: Pakistan Army; Bangladesh Army
- Service years: 1966-1972
- Rank: Major
- Units: Frontier Force Regiment; East Bengal Regiment
- Commands: Deputy Commander of K Force; Commander of K Force
- Conflicts: Bangladesh Liberation War
- Awards: Bir Uttom

Abdus Salek Choudhury (20 September 1946 - 19 November 1972) was a veteran of the Bangladesh Liberation War. For his bravery in the Bangladeshi war of independence, the government of Bangladesh awarded him the title of Bir Uttom. He held the rank of captain during the war. He served as commander of Sector-2.

== Career ==
Chowdhury was commissioned in the Pakistan Army in the 25th Frontier Force Regiment in 1966. In 1971, Chowdhury served in the Pakistan Army. At that time, he was working in Dhaka Cantonment. He was in Dhaka in March. He fled on 22 April and joined the Bangladesh Liberation War. Initially, he fought in Comilla under Khaled Musharraf (Bir Uttom). Later, when the Salda sector was formed, he was appointed as the captain of the Salda River sub-sector of sector two. When Khaled Musharraf was injured in October, Major Chowdhury became the commander of the Mukti Bahini 'K' Force.

At the end of September 1971, the entire area, including Nayanpur, near the Salda River railway station in Brahmanbaria District, was heavily defended by the Pakistan Army. In September, Pakistani forces strengthened their defenses, and the Mukti Bahini attacked, led by Chowdhury. They were able to force the Pakistan Army to retreat. Chowdhury managed to attack the rear of the Pakistan Army with artillery support from the Indian Army.

== Legacy ==
On 11 February 2010, a book was published about his life titled "Major Abdus Salek Chowdhury and the Salda War".
