= Mirza Aftabul Qader =

Freedom fighters of bangladesh

Mirza Aftabul Qader Bir Uttom
- Born: 25 December 1947; Lakshmipur, East Bengal, Pakistan
- Died: 27 April 1971 (aged 23); Ramgarh, Chittagong Tracts, Bangladesh
- Military career
- Allegiance: Pakistan (before 1971); Bangladesh
- Branch: Pakistan Army; Bangladesh Army
- Service years: 1968-1971
- Rank: Captain
- Unit: Regiment of Artillery
- Commands: Battery Commander of Sector – I
- Conflicts: Bangladesh Liberation war †
- Awards: Bir Uttom

Mirza Aftabul Qader was a Bangladesh Army officer who was killed in the Bangladesh Liberation War. He was posthumously awarded Bir Uttam by the government of Bangladesh.

== Early life ==
Qader was born in Lakshmipur, East Bengal, Pakistan, on 25 December 1948. He completed his SSC at Ananda Mohan College in Mymensingh and HSC at Anandamohan College. He entered the Dhaka University English Department.

== Career ==
While Qader was still a freshman at Dhaka University, he joined the 39 Long Course of Pakistan Military Academy on 16 November 1966. On 25 November 1968, he received his commission in the Pakistan Army and was stationed in the 40 Field Artillery Regiment. He arrived in Dhaka in February 1971 for a holiday. He witnessed the start of Operation Searchlight and the violence used by the Pakistan Army on 25 March 1971. He left home on 27 March 1971 to join the Bangladesh Liberation War. He initially joined up with Bengali members of the East Pakistan Rifles (present Border Guards Bangladesh), who were located near Shuvapur Bridge in Chittagong. He fought several battles there and in Rangamati district.

== Death ==
Qader's unit was attacked by a combined force of Pakistan Army commandoes and the Mizo Lion Brigade of the Mizo insurgency on 27 April 1971. He fought the ambush using his LMG; he was killed in action. His body was buried in Ramgarh Upazila near the battlefield. He was awarded Bir Uttom, the second-highest award for individual gallantry in Bangladesh. Shaheed Captain Aftabul Qader, Bir Uttam Memorial Trust Fund was set up in 2012 in his memory.

== Footnotes ==
- This article has been translated from the original report titled "তোমাদের এ ঋণ শোধ হবে না" published on 14 July 2011 in The Daily Prothom Alo. The Daily Prothom Alo has released a Creative Commons Attribution-Share-Alike 3.0 international license on Wikipedia (Permitted). The reports were written by Rashedur Rahman (also known as Tara Rahman) on behalf of The Daily Prothom Alo Liberation War Trust.
