= Şerafettin Mağmumi =

Turkish politician

Personal details
- Born: 1860 Constantinople, Ottoman Empire
- Died: 1931 (aged 70–71)

Şerafettin Mağmumi (1860–1931) was an Ottoman intellectual and physician. He was one of the original founders of the Committee of the Ottoman Union.
