= Jamil Uddin Ahmed =

Bangladeshi army general (1933–1975)

Jamil Uddin Ahmed Bir Uttom
- জামিল উদ্দিন আহমেদ
- Born: 1 February 1933; Kushtia, Bengal, British India
- Died: 15 August 1975 (aged 42); Dhanmondi, Dhaka, Bangladesh
- Burial place: Banani Military Graveyard
- Education: University of Dhaka
- Spouse: Anjuman Ara Jamil
- Children: 4
- Military career
- Allegiance: Pakistan; Bangladesh
- Branch: Pakistan Army; Bangladesh Army
- Service years: 1955–1975
- Rank: Brigadier General
- Unit: Corps of Signals
- Commands: Military Secretary to Prime Minister; Military Secretary to President; Director General of Forces Intelligence
- Conflicts: Indo-Pakistani War of 1965; Indo-Pakistani War of 1971; 15 August 1975 Bangladeshi coup d'état †
- Awards: Bir Uttom; Sitara-e-Harb; Tamgha-e-Jang; Tamgha-e-Jamhuria

Jamil Uddin Ahmed BU psc (1 February 1933 - 15 August 1975) was a career officer in the Pakistan Army Signal Corps and then the Bangladesh Army. Appointed as the military secretary to the president of Bangladesh in 1973, he was killed in the early hours of 15 August 1975, while he was on his way to aid the then president, Sheikh Mujibur Rahman who was assassinated that night during a military coup. In 2010, Ahmed was posthumously promoted to the rank of brigadier general and awarded the Bir Uttom, Bangladesh's second highest military honour.

== Early life and education ==
He was born on 1 February 1933 in Kushtia. He passed S.S.C. in 1948 from Jessore Zilla School. In the same year, he was admitted into the Jagannath College. He completed his higher secondary studies in 1950. He was admitted into the Dhaka University but dropped out as he joined the army when he was at 2nd year.

== Career ==
=== Pakistan Army ===
He joined Pakistan Military Academy in 1952 and was commissioned into the Corps of Signals in 1955. His parent unit was 10th Division Signals Regiment. In 1958, he was posted to the General Headquarters, signals directorate battalion. He spent long time of his career in Field Intelligence Unit and Inter-Services Intelligence. He was promoted to the rank of captain in 1959 and was posted to the 19th signals battalion and eventually served as adjutant in 1963. Later in the same year, he went to United States to complete his radio communication course from Signal School at Fort Monmouth. He returned to Inter-Services Intelligence in 1964 and was posted to the ISI's Khulna Branch as its GSO-3 in 1965. In 1966, he was posted to the Dhaka Branch. He was promoted to the rank of major in 1967. In 1969, he obtained his staff college course from command and staff college, Quetta and was posted to 16th signals battalion. Later in the same year, he was posted to IV Corps headquarters as grade staff officer second grade. In September 1971, he was posted to the 11th Signals Battalion as the second in command. He served there till February 1972. In February 1972, he was taken to Peshawar POW camp initially. He repatriated to Bangladesh on 13 October 1973.

=== Bangladesh Army ===
He was made a lieutenant colonel in 1973 and appointed in 1st signals Battalion. He was promoted to colonel in December 1973. On 17 January 1974, he was appointed as grade staff officer first grade in Directorate General of Forces Intelligence. Later on 1 March 1974, he was appointed as the military secretary to the prime minister of Bangladesh. When Sheikh Mujibur Rahman became president of Bangladesh, he was appointed as the military secretary to the president of Bangladesh on 11 March 1975. In July 1975, he was promoted to the rank of brigadier and appointed as the director general of DGFI but declined the post because of absence by Brigadier Abdur Rauf (then DG of Directorate General of Forces Intelligence).

== Death ==
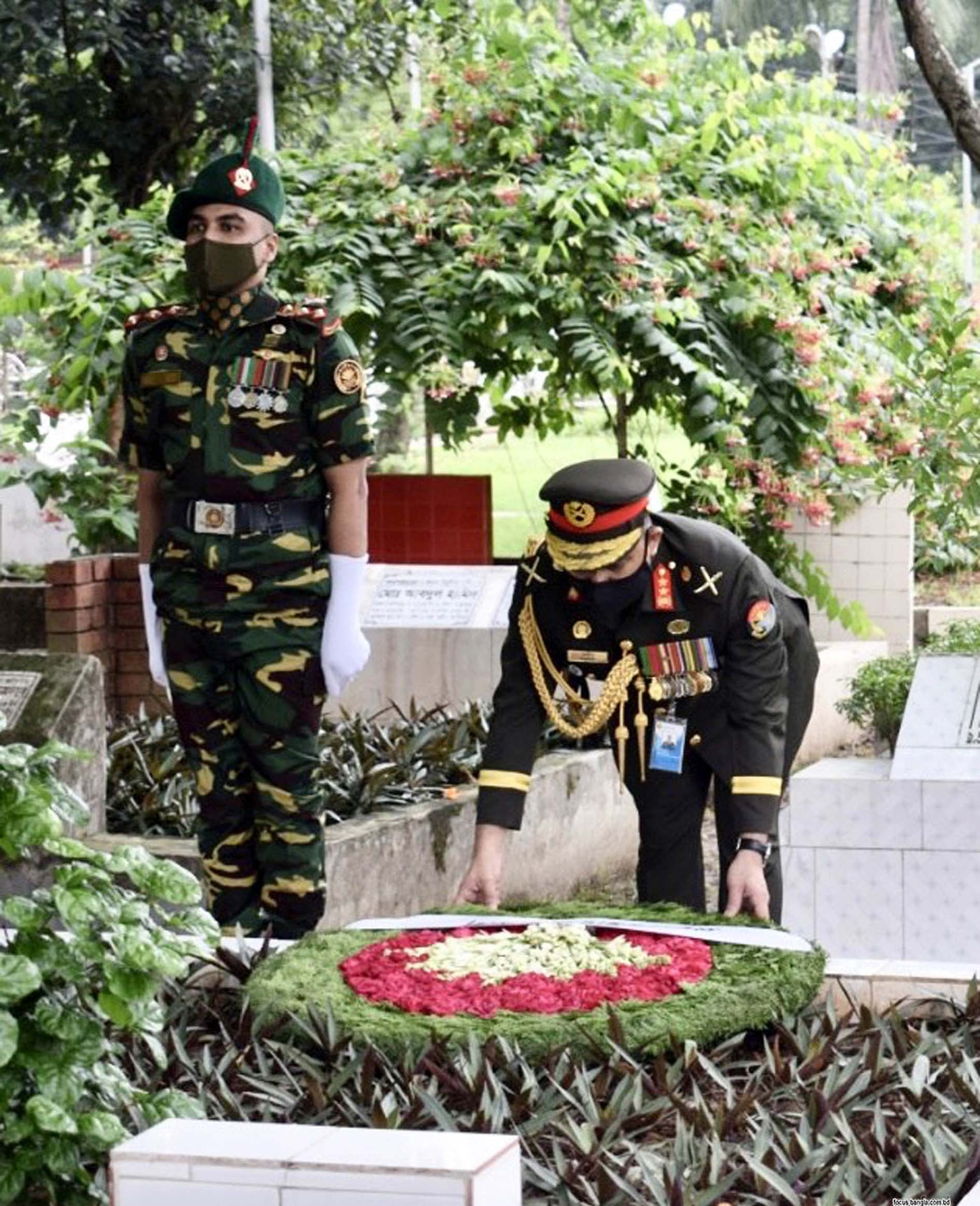
Grave of Ahmed in Banani military graveyard, Dhaka

On 15 August 1975, The then president, Mujibur Rahman called him for aid when his house was attacked by mutineers. He rushed towards Mujib's residence armed only with his side arm. He met soldiers of President Guard Regiment along the entrance and asked them to move towards the president's house but they were reluctant so he made decision to then rush ahead alone. He was killed in the early hours of 15 August. In 2010, Ahmed was posthumously promoted to brigadier general and awarded the Bir Uttam, Bangladesh's second highest military decoration.

== Personal life ==
He married Anjuman Ara Jamil. They had 4 daughters.

== Awards and decorations ==

Bir Uttom (Great Valiant Hero) (posthumous)	Sitara-e-Harb 1965 War (War Star 1965)	Tamgha-e-Jang 1965 War (War Medal 1965)	Tamgha-e-Jamhuria (Republic Commemoration Medal) 1956
