= G. M. Mushfiqur Rahman =

Lieutenant in the Bangladesh Army

G M Mushfiqur Rahman
- Born: Golam Mohammad Mushfiqur Rahman; 30 November 1966; Satkhira, East Pakistan, Pakistan
- Died: 8 September 1989 (aged 22); Guimara, Chittagong, Bangladesh
- Burial place: Meherpur, Khulna
- Education: Bangladesh Military Academy
- Military career
- Allegiance: Bangladesh
- Branch: Bangladesh Army
- Service years: 1986–1989
- Rank: Lieutenant
- Unit: Regiment of Artillery
- Commands: Camp Commander of 1st Field Artillery Regiment
- Conflicts: Chittagong Hill Tracts Conflict †
- Awards: Bir Uttom

Golam Mohammad Mushfiqur Rahman BU (30 November 1966 – 8 September 1989) was a lieutenant in the Bangladesh Army. Rahman was one of two military officers who were awarded Bir Uttom, the other being Brigadier Jamil Uddin Ahmed who died while trying to prevent the assassination of President Sheikh Mujibur Rahman, after the end of Bangladesh Liberation War.

== Biography ==
Rahman was born on 30 November 1966 in Satkhira District, East Pakistan, Pakistan. He was commissioned from the Bangladesh Military Academy in 1986 along with 15 Long Course. He was posted in 1 Field Artillery Regiment of Bangladesh Army in Chittagong Hill Tracts.

On 8 September 1989, Rahman led a 17-member team of Bangladesh Army soldiers and attacked a Shanti Bahini camp during the Chittagong Hill Tracts conflict. Lieutenant Rahman was injured during the clash and died on that day at 8:15 am. He was posthumously awarded with the Bir Uttom award on 8 September 1989. Shaheed Lt. G. M. Mushfique Bir Uttam High School in Chittagong was named after him.
