= A. G. Mahmud =

Bangladeshi military officer

A. G. Mahmud TBt
- আব্দুল গাফফার মাহমুদ

Adviser for Food
- In office 27 March 1982 – 15 January 1985
- Preceded by: Abdul Halim Chowdhury
- Succeeded by: Mohabbat Jan Chowdhury
- In office 6 September 1976 – 14 July 1977
- Preceded by: Khademul Bashar
- Succeeded by: Abdul Momen Khan

Adviser for Civil Aviation and Tourism
- In office 6 September 1976 – 3 July 1978
- Preceded by: Khademul Bashar
- Succeeded by: Kazi Anwarul Haque

4th Chief of Air Staff
- In office 5 September 1976 – 8 December 1977
- President: Abu Sadat Mohammad Sayem; Ziaur Rahman
- Prime Minister: None
- Preceded by: Khademul Bashar
- Succeeded by: Sadruddin Mohammad Hossain

Personal details
- Born: Abdul Ghaffar Mahmud; 1 March 1934 (age 92) Calcutta, Bengal, British India
- Awards: Order of the Rising Sun 2nd Class; Independence Day Award; Tamgha-i-Basalat

Military service
- Allegiance: Pakistan (before 1973); Bangladesh
- Branch/service: Pakistan Air Force; Bangladesh Air Force
- Years of service: 1954–1977
- Rank: Air Vice Marshal
- Unit: No. 14 Squadron
- Commands: Assistant Commandant Pakistan Air Force Academy; Director (Operations) at BBA; Base Commander of BAF Base Zahurul Haque; Air Secretary at Air Headquarters; ACAS (Operations) of Air Headquarters; Chief of Air Staff
- Battles/wars: Indo-Pak War of 1965; Indo-Pak War of 1971

A. G. Mahmud (born 1 March 1934) is a former chief of the Bangladesh Air Force. He negotiated the release of hostages from the hijacked Japan Airlines Flight 472. For his role in keeping the situation under control and securing the lives of every single passenger, the Japanese government conferred upon him the "Order of the Rising Sun, Gold and Silver Star" awards.

== Early life ==
AVM Mahmud was born on 1 March 1934 in a noble Muslim family. His father taught at an Aliya Madrasah, and Mahmud studied at a madrasah in Kolkata. After the 1947 partition of India, he and his family moved to East Pakistan. He passed his matriculation from Dhaka Collegiate School in 1949. He passed his intermediate from Jagannath College.

== Career ==
=== Pakistan Air Force ===
Mahmud joined the Pakistan Air Force on 14 July 1952 as a flight cadet. He was commissioned in the General Duties (Pilot) branch on 2 February 1954. After being commissioned, he was sent to PAF Base Masroor for his fighter pilot training. He was posted to No. 14 Squadron PAF in Peshawar. In 1955, he was sent to jet conversion school. After completing this course, he was posted to No. 15 Squadron PAF at PAF Base Masroor. He was sent to flying instructors school in September 1957 for a training course. After completing his course, he was posted to the Pakistan Air Force Academy as an instructor. In 1958 he was promoted to the rank of flight lieutenant. In 1960 he was sent to the United States to complete his basic instructor course. In 1964 he was sent to California State University to complete his aerospace safety and aircraft accident investigation course. He studied there for six months. Upon his return to Pakistan, he was appointed a member of the Central Aircraft Accident Investigation Board.

In 1965, he was posted to PAF Base Risalpur as the commanding officer of No. 4 Squadron PAF. He fought in the Indo-Pakistani war of 1965. He was awarded two war participation medals and the Tamgha-i-Basalat for gallantry by the Pakistan government. After the war he was posted to No. 2 Squadron PAF as its commanding officer. In 1967, he was posted to flying instructors school as its commanding officer. In 1968 he was promoted to the rank of wing commander. In 1969 he was appointed the assistant commandant of the Pakistan Air Force Academy. In 1970, he went to PAF Air War College to complete his staff course. After completing his staff course, he was posted to PAF HQ as the deputy director of flying training in July 1971.

=== Bangladesh Air Force ===
Mahmud was repatriated to independent Bangladesh in 1973 and was made director (operations and engineering) of Biman Bangladesh Airlines on the orders of General M. A. G. Osmani. He resigned from Biman Bangladesh Airlines after the chairman of the airlines revoked the suspension of a pilot without his consultation. He found himself at a disadvantage at the Bangladesh Air Force, where promotion priority was given to veterans of the Bangladesh Liberation War. After his departure from Biman Bangladesh Airlines, he was posted to Chittagong as the base commander of Chittagong Air Base. After the 15 August 1975 Bangladeshi coup d'état and assassination of Sheikh Mujibur Rahman, the chief of air staff, A. K. Khandker, was removed and posted to a diplomatic mission. Khandker was replaced by Muhammad Ghulam Tawab, who was replaced by Khademul Bashar. Mahmud succeeded Bashar, who died in a plane crash, as chief of air staff. In 1976, he was promoted to the rank of air commodore. In April 1976, he was made the assistant chief of air staff (operations and training) at the BAF HQ. He was the chief of the Bangladesh Air Force from 5 September 1976 to 8 December 1977. He was part of a delegation that asked President Abu Sadat Mohammad Sayem to relinquish power in favor of General Ziaur Rahman.

He served various fighter squadrons of the PAF and BAF and logged over 3,485 hours to his credit.

In 1977, Mahmud negotiated with the Japanese Red Army, who had hijacked Japan Airlines Flight 472 and landed the flight in Dhaka Airport. He worked to get the hostages freed. During the hostage crisis on 1 October, the 1977 Bangladesh Air Force mutiny took place. Group Captain Ansar Chowdhury was killed beside Mahmud. Captain Sadik Hasan Rumi led an operation to rescue Abdul Gafoor Mahmud, chief of air staff of the Bangladesh Air Force. His brother-in-law, Group Captain Raas Masud, was killed in the mutiny. Squadron Leader Md. Abdul Matin and Wing Commander Anwar Ali Shaikh were also killed in the mutiny. Mahmud resigned in December 1977 over the fallout of the mutiny and subsequent mass trials.

Mahmud became the minister for food, health, and rehabilitation in the cabinet of President Hussain Muhammad Ershad in 1982. He served there until January 1985.

In April 2017, Mahmud was awarded the Order of the Rising Sun, Gold and Silver Star, for his role in negotiating with the hijackers of Japan Airlines Flight 472.

== Personal life ==
Mahmud married Syeda Asiya Begum in 1957; they divorced in 1964. He remarried to Hasina Maya.

== Bibliography ==
- My Destiny (2013) - autobiography

== Awards and decorations ==

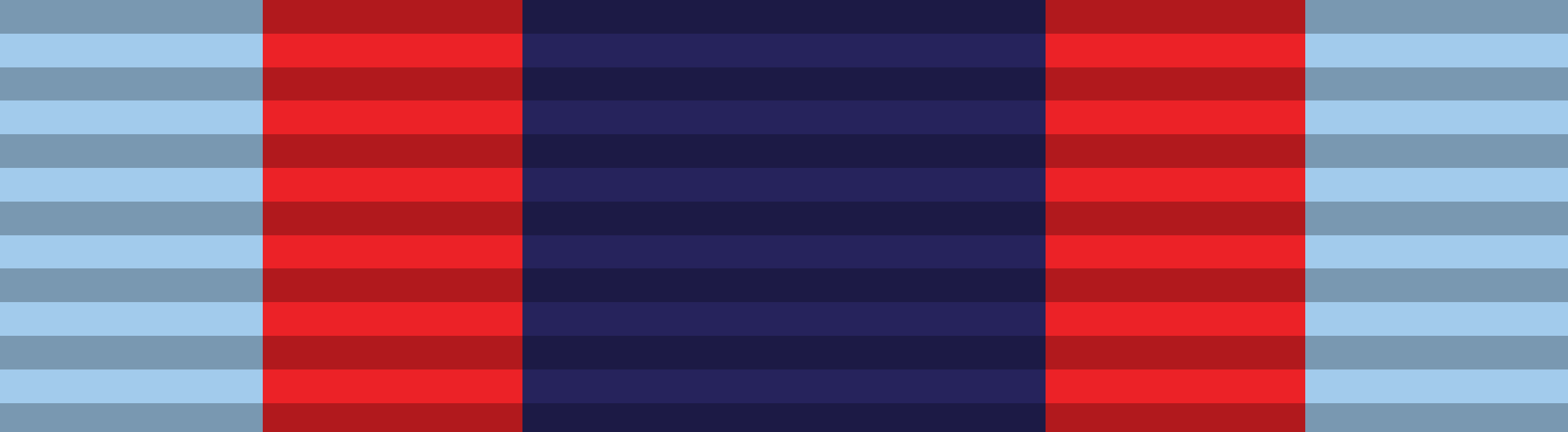

Independence Award	Order of the Rising Sun 2nd Class	Joy Padak	Songbidhan Padak
Tamgha-i-Basalat (Indo-Pakistani War of 1965)	Sitara-e-Harb 1965 War (War Star 1965)	Tamgha-e-Jang 1965 War (War Medal 1965)	Tamgha-e-Jamhuria (Republic Commemoration Medal) 1956

Military offices
Preceded by Air Vice Marshal Khademul Bashar	Chief of Air Staff; 1977 – 1981	Succeeded by Air Vice Marshal Sadruddin Mohammad Hossain
