= Sadruddin Mohammad Hossain =

Bangladeshi Air Force officer

Chief of Air Staff
- In office 9 December 1977 – July 1981
- President: Ziaur Rahman; Abdus Sattar
- Preceded by: Abdul Gafoor Mahmud

Personal details
- Awards: Bir Protik

Military service
- Allegiance: Bangladesh
- Branch/service: Bangladesh Air Force
- Rank: Air Vice Marshal
- Battles/wars: Bangladesh Liberation War

Sadruddin Mohammad Hossain, Bir Protik is a retired air vice marshal and former chief of the Bangladesh Air Force. He participated in Bangladesh Liberation War and was awarded Bir Protik for it.

On 8 December 1977, Air Vice Marshal A. G. Mahmud was retired. Sadruddin was promoted to air commodore and succeeded Mahmud as chief of air staff. According to political scientist Asish K. Roy, the replacement irritated other senior air force officers, and 11 of them resigned.

By February 1979, Sadruddin had been promoted to air vice marshal.

Sadruddin was still chief of air staff in June 1981, when Major General Abul Manzoor surrendered to police after the assassination of President Ziaur Rahman. Sadruddin argued to President Abdus Sattar and the army chief, General Hussain Muhammad Ershad, that Manzoor should not be handed over to the army. Meanwhile, the army seized Manzoor. He died in their custody in unexplained circumstances. Sadruddin was swiftly removed from command. Sadruddin said that he resigned from the post of chief of air staff in July 1981 because he disagreed with the imposition of martial law in the aftermath of the assassination of Ziaur Rahman.
