= Bir Uttom =

Second highest award for individual gallantry in Bangladesh

Bir Uttom (BU)
- Type: Military medal
- Awarded for: Brave warrior of the Liberation War of Bangladesh in 1971
- Description: The second highest award for individual gallantry in Bangladesh
- Presented by: Bangladesh
- Eligibility: All citizen of Bangladesh including forces at liberation war 1971
- Status: 15 December 1973
- Established: 1973
- First award: 15 December 1973
- Final award: 22 April 2010

Highlights
- Total: 69
- Total awarded posthumously: 22
- Total recipients: 69
- Ribbon bar

Precedence
- Next (higher): Bir Shrestho
- Equivalent: Bir Mrittunjoee
- Next (lower): Bir Bikrom

Bir Uttom (Bengali: বীর উত্তম, lit. 'Great Valiant Hero') is the second highest award for individual gallantry in Bangladesh after the Bir Sreshtho and the highest gallantry award for living individual.

Since the independence of Bangladesh in 1971, 69 people have been awarded the Bir Uttom.

== Recipients ==
This award was declared on 15 December 1973. A total of 67 people have been rewarded for their bravery and dedication in the liberation war of Bangladesh in 1971.

Lieutenant G. M. Mushfiqur Rahman Bir Uttam (1966–1989) was posted in 1 Field Artillery Regiment of Bangladesh Army in the Chittagong Hill Tracts. On 8 September 1989, he led a 17-member team of Bangladesh Army soldiers and attacked a terrorist Shanti Bahini camp. Lieutenant Rahman was injured during the clash and he died on 8 September 1989 at 8.15 am. He was posthumously awarded the Bir Uttom award.

In April 2010, Brigadier General Jamil Uddin Ahmad was posthumously conferred with the Bir Uttom for being the only army officer present and who was killed while trying to counter the successful assassination attempt on President Sheikh Mujibur Rahman on 15 August 1975.

The following list has been prepared from the Bangladesh Gazette of 15 December 1973:

=== Bangladesh Army ===
Sl. no.	ID no.	Rank (At the time of the award)	NAME
01	P.A.-5115	Major	Ziaur Rahman
02	P.R.R.-1550	Lieutenant colonel	Md. A. Rob, M.N.A.
03	P.A.-5121	Major	K. M. Shafiullah
04	P.A.-3613	Major	Chitta Ranjan Dutta
05	P.A.-2215	Major	Quazi Nuruzzaman
06	P.A.-5512	Major	Mir Shawkat Ali
08	P.A.-5553	Major	Khaled Mosharraf
09	P.A.-6030	Major	Abul Manzur
10	P. A.-6472	Major	Abu Taher
11	P.A.-182	Major	A. J. M. Aminul Haque
12	P.A.-6286	Captain	A. N. M. Nuruzzaman
13	P.A.-7210	Major	Rafiqul Islam
14	P.S.S.-7704	Captain	Abdus Salek Choudhury
15	-	Leader Gonobahini	Khwaja Nizamuddin Bhuyan (Shaheed)
16	P.A.-7942	Captain	Harun Ahmed Choudhury
16	P.S.S.-8544	Major	A.T.M. Haider
17	P.S.S.-10012	Captain	M.A. Gaffar Haldar
18	P.A.-10170	Major	Shariful Haque Dalim
19	P.A.-11521	Captain	Mohammad Shahjahan
20	P.A.-11562	Captain	Mahbubur Rahman
21	P.A.-6489	Major	Mohammad Ziauddin
22	P.A.-10561	Captain	Mirza Aftabul Qader (Posthumously)
23	P.A.-11038	Captain	Mahbubur Rahman (Shaheed)
24	-	Captain (2-E.Bengal)	Salah Uddin Momtaz (Posthumously)
25	P.A.-10244	Captain (2-E.Bengal)	Mohammad Azizur Rahman
26	N.Y.A.	Lieutenant (8-E. Bengal)	S. M. Imdadul Hoque (Shaheed)
27	N.Y.A.	2nd Lieutenant(1-E Bengal)	Mohammad Anwar Hossain (Shaheed)
28	S.S.-33	2nd Lieutenant(1-E Bengal)	Abu Mayeen Ashfakus Samad (Shaheed)
29	B.J.O.-26507	Subedar (3-East Bengal)	Aftab Ali
30	B.J.O.-3932129	Subedar	Fayez Ahmed
31	B.J.O.-3933821	Naib Subedar	Belayet Ahmed (Shaheed)
32	B.J.O.-3933525	Naib Subedar	Moinul Hossain (Shaheed)
33	N.Y.A.	Naib Subedar (3-East Bengal)	Habibur Rahman
34	3931908	Havildar	Md. Shah Alam (Shaheed)
35	3940899	Havildar	Nurul Amin
36	1240160	Havildar	Nasir Uddin (Shaheed)
37	3937853	Naik	Abdul Mannan (Shaheed)
38	3937853	Lance Naik	Abdul Latif (Shaheed)
39	14561	Lance Naik	Abdus Sattar
40	6804756	Sepoy	Nurul Haque (Shaheed)
41	-	Sepoy (8-E. Bengal)	Mohammad Shamsuzzaman (Shaheed)
42	-	Sepoy (9-E. Bengal)	Shafil Min (Shaheed)
43	B.J.O.-893	Subedar	Fazlu Rahman (Shaheed)
44	B.J.O.-8772	Naib Subedar	Mujibur Rahman (Shaheed)
45	6613	Naik	Shafiuddin Choudhury (Shaheed)
46	17663	Sepoy	Abu Taleb (Shaheed)
47	0259	Sepoy	Mohammad Salahuddin Ahmed
48	13075	Sepoy	Anwar Hossain (Shaheed)
49	6040	Sepoy	Ershad Ali (Shaheed)

=== Bangladesh Navy ===
Sl. no.	ID no.	Rank (At the time of award)	NAME
49	240241	Civilian	Muhammad Tanvirul Islam Shayeem
50	0148	Naval Commando	Mozahar Ullah
51	66059	L/S	Mohammad Zalal Uddin
52	66252	E-R-A	Mohammad Afzal Miah
53	640512	M-E-I	Mohammad Badiul Alam
54	620316	A-B	Mohammed Sirajul Moula
55	67981	Sub/Lt.	Abdul Wahid Choudhury
56	0230	Sub/Lt.	Matiur Rahman (Bir Bikrom)
57	0072	Naval Commando	Mohammad Shah Alam

=== Bangladesh Air Force ===
Sl. no.	ID no.	Rank (At the time of award)	NAME
58	B.D- 1300	Group captain	Abdul Karim Khandker
59	B.D. -3733	Wing commander	M Khademul Bashar
60	4295	Squadron Leader	Sultan Mahmud
61	4921	Flight Lieutenant	Shamsul Alam
62	4974	Flight Lieutenant	Badrul Alam
63	5121	Flying Officer	Liaquat Ali Khan

=== Civilians ===
Sl. no.	ID no.	Rank (At the time of award)	Name
64	-	Captain	Shahabuddin Ahmed
65	-	Captain	Akram Ahmed
66	-	Captain	Sharfuddin Ahmed
67	-	H. 2nd Lt.	M H Siddiqui
68	-	-	Abdul Kader Siddiqui

=== Post 1971 ===
Sl. no.	ID no.	Rank (At the time of award)	NAME	Note
69	B.A.-3176	Lieutenant (Posthumous)	G.M. Mushfiqur Rahman	For role in CHT conflict
70	-	Brigadier General (Posthumous)	Jamil Uddin Ahmad	For role in 1975 coup

== See also ==
- Bir Shreshtho
- Bir Bikrom
- Bir Protik
- Awards and decorations of the Bangladesh Armed Forces
