= Halishahar Cantonment =

Bangladeshi military cantonment

- হালিশহর সেনানিবাস
- Halishahar, Chittagong, Bangladesh

Site information
- Type: Cantonment
- Controlled by: Bangladesh Army

Garrison information
- Current commander: BA-5498 Brig Gen Md Abul Kalam Sumsuddin Rana, PBGM, ndc, afwc, psc, G (Commandant Artillery Center)

Halishahar Cantonment is a cantonment managed by the Bangladesh Army situated at Halishahar in Chittagong, Bangladesh. This is one of 34 cantonments across the country.

== Installation ==
- Artillery Center and School (AC&S)

== Education ==
- Halishahar Cantonment Public School & College
- Shaheed Lt. G. M. Mushfique Bir Uttam High School
- Gunners' English School
