= Latif Bahini =

Bangladeshi militia during the Bangladesh War of Independence

- লতিফ বাহিনী
- Other name: Polashdanga Youth Camp; Mirza Abdul Latif Bahini
- Founder: Abdul Latif Mirza
- Dates active: 1971
- Country: Bangladesh
- Headquarters: Sirajganj District (Note: Initially, It was raised in Vodroghat Village, near Kamarkhand Police Station, In Sirajganj District)
- Active regions: Bangladesh
- Size: 8,000 - 10,000

Latif Bahini (Also known as Mirza Abdul Latif Bahini) (Note: Bengali: লতিফ বাহিনী, romanized: Latipha bāhinī) was a militia during the Bangladesh War of Independence. Abdul Latif Mirza was a member in the Bangladesh Forces. He planned to build a force in Vodroghat village under Kamarkhand Police Station in Sirajganj District, Rajshahi Division.

== Formation ==
Initially, Abdul Latif Mirza organised a team filled with youths, and named it 'Polashdanga Youth Camp'. The force had only 7 rifles and 15 fighters. Later on, the group became significantly larger, with around 8,000 to 10,000 fighters in the militia. It later became known as the Latif Bahini. In addition to the branch of military training, the force later had political, intelligence and reconnaissance branches.

== Military engagements ==
Latif Bahini fought Pakistani troops and Razakar militias in various districts in North Bengal including Natore, Bogra, Rajshahi, Pabna and Sirajganj and attacked various Pakistani military camps and Razakar positions, This force fought in notable battles like, The Battle of Kashinathpur Bhab Bagan, The Battle of Ghatna, The Battle of Ullapar. One notable raid was on Tarash Police Station in Sirajganj. Numerous Pakistani troops and Razakars were killed in the raid, a Pakistani officer was captured and 13 troops were also captured, No casualty was reported on the Bengali side. On 11 December 1971, 630 fighters fought with Pakistani troops and on 13 December 1971, Tarash was liberated, 150 Pakistani troops were killed in the battle and 9 surrendered, including an officer and 2 members of the Latif Bahini were wounded in the result of the battle. Later on December 13, the national flag was hoisted in Tarash Upazila.

== See also ==
- Bangladesh Liberation War
- List of sectors in the Bangladesh Liberation War
- Mukti Bahini
- Gafur Bahini
- Mujib Bahini
- Baten Bahini
- Hemayet Bahini
- Kader Bahini
