= Mujib Bahini =

Bengali armed force against Pakistan (1971)

- Leaders: Sheikh Fazlul Haque Mani, Tofael Ahmed, Serajul Alam Khan and Abdur Razzaq.
- Dates active: December 1971
- Active regions: Bangladesh
- Ideology: Mujibism; Bengali nationalism
- Size: 10,000
- Wars: Bangladesh Liberation War

The Mujib Bahini, initially called the Bangladesh Liberation Force (BLF), was an politico-armed force formed during the Bangladesh Liberation War to fight against Pakistan in 1971. The force was mainly composed of activists drawn from the Awami League and its student front, the Chhatra League. At its height, it had reportedly 10,000 members. It was organised with the active assistance of Major General Sujan Singh Uban of the Indian Army and Research and Analysis Wing. Serajul Alam Khan and Sheikh Fazlul Haque Mani, Tofail Ahmed and Abdur Razzaq were the organizers of this force.

== 1971 War of Independence ==
Mujib Bahini's exact involvement in the war is disputed, with Zafrullah Chowdhury stating, "The Mujib Bahini did not fight the liberation war." In 2014, A. K. Khandker was sued for accusing the Mujib Bahini of hooliganism and looting during the war in his book 1971: Bhetore Baire.

Professor Serajul Islam Choudhury of Dhaka University opined that four unnamed leaders of Mujib Bahini were more successful at creating a rift between Sheikh Mujibur Rahman and Tajuddin Ahmad than Khandaker Mushtaq Ahmed, creating difficulties for Ahmad.

== After 1971 ==
After the Bangladesh Liberation War of 1971, the Mujib Bahini was merged with the auxiliary Jatiya Rakkhi Bahini, which became infamous for its own human rights abuses.

=== Recollection of former members ===
Zainal Abedin, a former student leader and a freedom fighter who crossed over to India in 1971 and joined the Mujib Bahini, reminiscing about how the Indian handlers and RAW agents treated them

Our Indian handlers and trainers indicated that they treated us (the Freedom Fighters) not as friends but as agents. The real Indian face lay bare after the surrender of Pakistani forces, when I saw the large scale loot and plunder by the Indian Army personnel. The soldiers swooped on everything they found and carried them away to India. Curfew was imposed on our towns, industrial bases, ports, cantonments, commercial centres and even residential areas to make the looting easier. They lifted everything from ceiling fans to military equipment, utensils to water taps. Thousands of Army vehicles were used to carry looted goods to India. History has recorded few such cruel and heinous plunders. Such a large scale plunder could not have been possible without connivance of higher Indian authorities.

Some former members were rewarded by the Indian government and decided to become Indian citizens themselves. Bimal Pramanik, the director of Centre for Research in India-Bangladesh Relations, was a former sector commander of Mujib Bahini. He fled Bangladesh in the aftermath of Mujib's assassination in 1975 and shifted to Kolkata in 1976; he has been living in the city since then.

== See also ==
- Kader Bahini
- Human rights in Bangladesh
- Freedom of religion in Bangladesh
- Hemayet Bahini
- Afsar Bahini
- Baten Bahini
- Akbar Bahini
- Khalil Bahini
