= Md. Robiul Awal =

Bangladeshi politician

- মোঃ রবিউল আওয়াল

Member of the Bangladesh Parliament for Tangail-6
- Incumbent
- Assumed office 17 February 2026
- Preceded by: Ahasanul Islam Titu

Personal details
- Born: January 1, 1967 (age 59)q Nagarpur Upazila, Tangail District
- Party: Bangladesh Nationalist Party

Md. Robiul Awal is a Bangladeshi politician of the Bangladesh Nationalist Party. He is currently serving as a member of parliament from Tangail-6.

== Early life ==
Awal was born on 1 January 1967 in Nagarpur Upazila in Tangail District.
