= Hemayet Uddin =

Bangladeshi militia leader

Subedar Hemayet Uddin Bir Bikrom
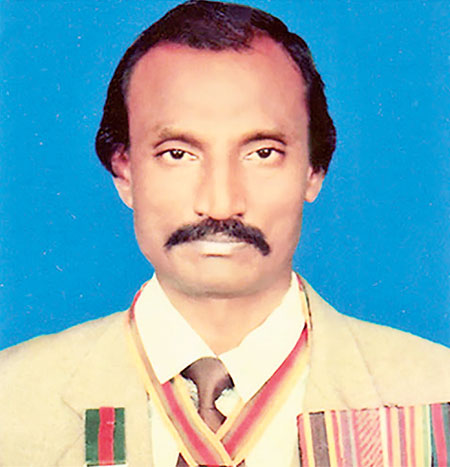
- Born: 3 December 1941; Kotalipara, Gopalganj
- Died: 22 October 2016 (aged 74); Dhaka
- Burial place: Kotalipara, Gopalganj
- Military career
- Allegiance: Bangladesh; Pakistan (before 1971)
- Branch: Pakistan Army
- Unit: East Bengal Regiment
- Commands: Hemayet Bahini
- Conflicts: Bangladesh Liberation War

Hemayet Uddin (BB) (Bengali: হেমায়েত উদ্দীন; 3 December 1937 – 22 October 2016), more widely known by his first name Hemayet, was a famous Bangladeshi militia leader and freedom fighter in the 1971 Liberation War of Bangladesh. For his valor, he was awarded the honor Bir Bikrom, a national award for gallantry and was conferred a military rank of Subedar after the war.

Apart from centrally coordinated Mukti Bahini and Mujib Bahini (Bangladesh Liberation Forces), a vast number of local resistance armies were formed during the liberation war of Bangladesh against Pakistani occupation. Hemayet Bahini (The Hemayet Force) was a notable one of them. It operated in the Gopalganj and Barishal region of the country and was successful in harassing and restricting the movement of Pakistani armed forces in the region.

Before the war, Hemayet Uddin was a Havildar of the East Bengal Regiment of Pakistan army. He also worked as an instructor at the Pakistan Military Academy in Abbottabad. He was cashiered from service in 1970 on account of political agitation.
