= Afsar Bahini =

Sub-group of the Mukti Bahini

- আফসার বাহিনী
- Founder: Afsaruddin Ahmed
- Dates active: 1971
- Country: Bangladesh
- Allegiance: Mukti Bahini
- Status: Dissolved
- Size: 4,500
- Part of: Mukti Bahini
- Wars: Bangladesh Liberation War

Afsar Bahini (also known as Afsar Battalion) was a sub-group within the Mukti Bahini during the Bangladesh War of Independence. Major Afsaruddin Ahmed organized fighters in Mymensingh to form this battalion. This battalion collected arms secretly from the Pakistan Army and developed captured areas in the region. The group had 4,500 members. Major Afsaruddin Ahmed was the Chief of Command of this group.

== See also ==
- Akbar Bahini
- Baten Bahini
- Khalil Bahini
