= Gautam Chakroborty =

Bangladeshi politician (1954–2022)

- গৌতম চক্রবর্তী

Member of Parliament for Tangail-6
- In office 14 July 1996 – 27 October 2006
- Preceded by: Khandaker Abu Taher
- Succeeded by: Khondokar Abdul Baten

State Minister of Water Resources
- In office 28 October 2001 – 27 October 2006
- Succeeded by: Mahbubur Rahman

Personal details
- Party: Bangladesh Nationalist Party

Gautam Chakroborty (1954 – 27 May 2022) was a Bangladesh Nationalist Party politician and a Jatiya Sangsad member representing the Tangail-6 constituency. He also served as the state minister of water resources.

== Early life ==
Born in East Pakistan, Gautam received his education up to LLB.

== Career ==
Chakroborty was elected to parliament from Tangail-6 (Nagarpur-Delduar) in 1996 and 2001 as a candidate of Bangladesh Nationalist Party (BNP) beating Bangladesh Awami League candidate Khondokar Abdul Baten twice. He received the nomination from the party in the 2008 Bangladesh General Election but lost the contest to Ahasanul Islam Titu of Awami League.

== Death ==
Chakroborty died from cardiac arrest in the afternoon/evening according to reports on 27 May 2022.
