= Khandaker Abdul Baten =

Bangladeshi politician (1946–2019)

- খন্দকার আবদুল বাতেন

Member of Parliament for Tangail-6
- In office 25 January 2009 – 29 January 2019
- Preceded by: Gautam Chakroborty
- Succeeded by: Ahasanul Islam Titu

Personal details
- Born: 17 May 1946
- Died: 21 January 2019 (aged 72)
- Party: Bangladesh Awami League

Military service
- Allegiance: Bangladesh
- Branch/service: Mukti Bahini
- Unit: Baten Bahini
- Battles/wars: Bangladesh Liberation War

Khandaker Abdul Baten (17 May 1946 – 21 January 2019) was a Bangladesh Awami League politician and a member of Parliament from Tangail-6.

== Early life ==
Baten completed his education up till the undergraduate level, securing a B.A. with honours.

== Career ==
Baten was a member of the Mukti Bahini during the Bangladesh Liberation War in 1971. He was a politician of the Jatiya Samajtantrik Dal party who joined the Bangladesh Awami League in 1992. He also took with him some of his followers. Some of the local Bangladesh Awami League politicians expressed disappointment when he joined. He lost the Tangail-6 (Nagarpur-Delduar) constituency election to Gautam Chakroborty – the Bangladesh Nationalist Party candidate, in 1996 and 2001. An inter Party feud led Bangladesh Awami League politicians to contest the polls as independent candidates costing Baten important votes. He was elected to Parliament in the 2008 Bangladeshi general election. He served on the Parliamentary Standing Committee on the Agriculture Ministry.
