= Noor Muhammad Khan =

Bangladeshi politician

Nur Mohammad Khan
- নূর মুহাম্মদ খান
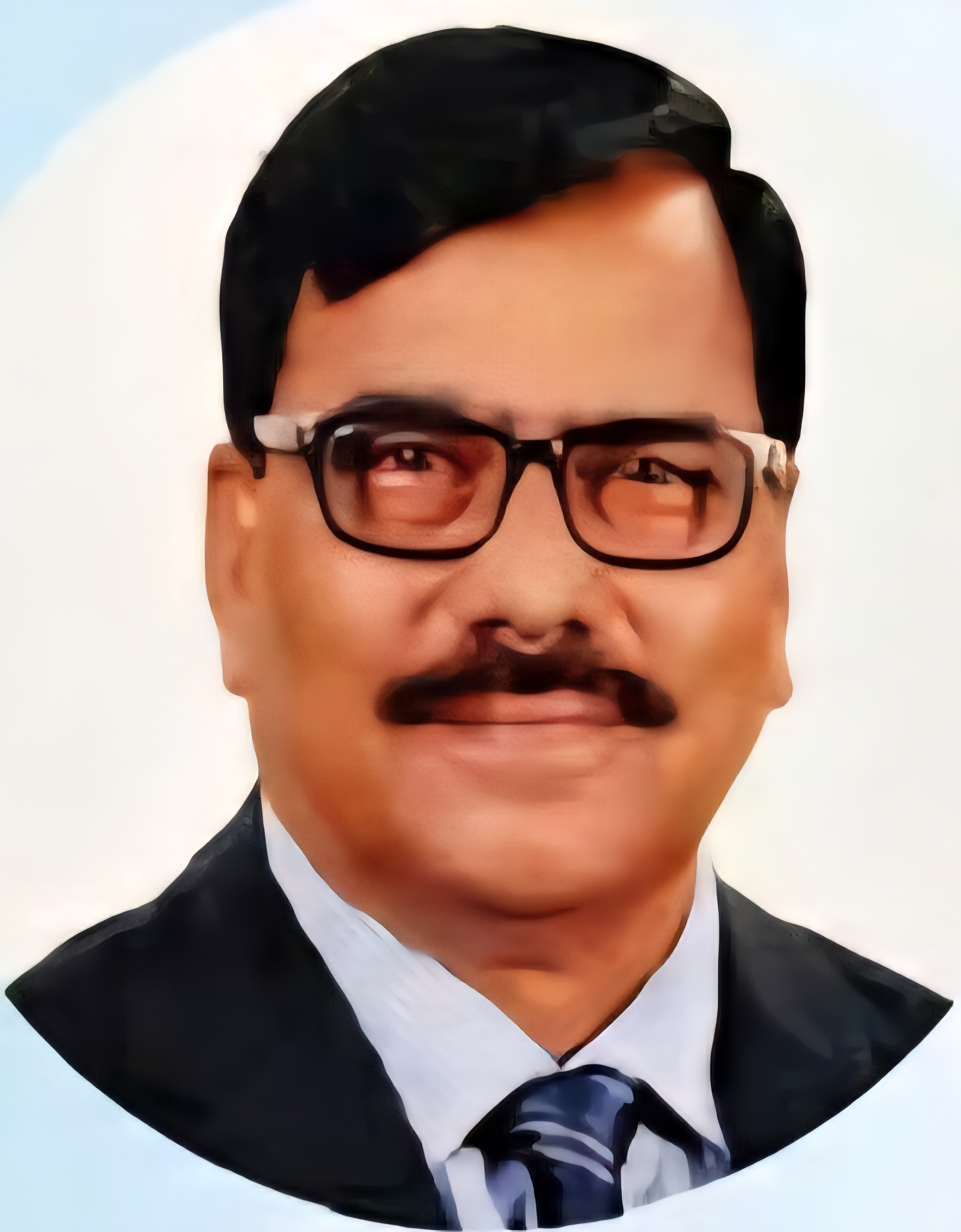
- Khan in 2024

Minister of Information and Broadcasting
- In office 24 November 1981 – 24 March 1982
- President: Abdus Sattar
- Preceded by: Shamsul Huda Chaudhury
- Succeeded by: Syed Najmuddin Hashim

Member of Parliament
- In office 2 April 1979 – 6 December 1990
- Preceded by: Abdul Mannan
- Succeeded by: Khandaker Abu Taher
- Constituency: Tangail-6

Personal details
- Born: 1 October 1947 (age 79) Tangail, Bengal Presidency now Bangladesh
- Party: Bangladesh Nationalist Party
- Other political affiliations: Jatiya Party (Ershad)
- Relations: Ishraque Hossain (son-in-law)
- Children: Nusrat Khan; Nafisa Khan; Nishat Khan

Noor Muhammad Khan (Bengali: নূর মুহাম্মদ খান), He is a Bangladeshi politician, a member of the Bangladesh Nationalist Party (BNP), and a former Member of Parliament for Tangail-6. He was a Minister in Ziaur Rahman's cabinet, Abdu Sattar's cabinet, and Ershad's cabinet.

== Career ==
Khan was elected to parliament from Tangail-6 as a Bangladesh Nationalist Party candidate in 1979.

Khan was elected to parliament from Tangail-6 as a Jatiya Party candidate in 1986 and 1988.

== Personal life ==
Noor Muhammad Khan is the father of three daughters: Barrister Nusrat Khan, Barrister Nafisa Khan, and Barrister Nishat Khan. His daughter, Barrister Nusrat Khan, is engaged to politician Ishraque Hossain.
