= Baten Bahini =

Militia during the Bangladesh Liberation War

- বাতেন বাহিনী
- Leaders: Khandaker Abdul Baten; Mir Shamshul Alam; Sahjada; A K M Azad; Shahzahan
- Founded: March 30, 1971
- Dates active: March 30, 1971–December 16, 1971
- Dissolved: March 9, 1972
- Country: Bangladesh
- Allegiance: Mukti Bahini
- Headquarters: Lauhati, Delduar Upazila, Tangail
- Active regions: Tangail, Manikganj, Pabna, Gazipur, Sirajganj District, Dhaka District
- Status: Disbanded
- Size: 21 companies, 63 platoons, 100 sections

Baten Bahini was an armed guerrilla force formed in Tangail district in support of independence during the Bangladesh Liberation War in 1971. It was named after its leader, Khandaker Abdul Baten. Throughout the war, it conducted a number of successful guerrilla campaigns in Tangail, Manikganj, Pabna, Gazipur, Sirajganj and some parts of Dhaka District. It was organized into 21 companies, 63 platoons, and 100 sections. Abdul Baten led a number of guerrilla attacks.

== Structure and history ==
During the Liberation War, Abdul Baten was the vice president of the Student Union of Government Saadat University College in Tangail. On March 30, 1971, after a student of Saadat University College, Jumrat Ali, was killed by Pakistani forces in Achimtal of Sakhipur Upazila, Abdul Baten returned to his native area Nagarpur and formed the Baten Bahini (Baten Force) with a few acquaintances. In the beginning, he collected two guns and 165 rounds of ammunition. Later, he collected another 8–10 guns. Meanwhile, in Konra of Abdul Baten's village Nagarpur, a 10-member resistance committee was formed under the leadership of Mir Shamsul Alam Shahzada, and they also joined the Baten Bahini.

The recruitment center of the force was established at Lauhati in Delduar Upazila of Tangail, and the training centers were in Tangail district and India. At the beginning, Mir Shamsul Alam Shahzada served as the head of security and civilian affairs, Upendra Nath Sarker as the head of information and intelligence, Delwar Hossain Harij as the deputy chief (recruitment and Joy Bangla Company commander), M A Rashid as the deputy chief (quartermaster and Bangabandhu Company commander), and Khandaker Abdus Salam served as the recruitment and management officer. In addition, the force had 9 assistant security and civilian officers, 2 assistant recruitment officers, a medical team of 11 members, and 4 persons in charge of food management.

The Baten Bahini started its combat on May 4, 1971, by attacking the Singair police station in Manikganj district. Later, one after another, they attacked and took control of Daulatpur, Saturia, and Ghior police stations in Manikganj district, Nagarpur police station in Tangail, and Chauhali police station in Sirajganj. On July 18, 1971, Baten went to India for weapons and training purposes. During this time, A K M Azad Shahjahan served as the chief of the force, and Mir Shamsul Alam Shahzada was the head of security. From late July to December, the war operations were conducted under their leadership.

On January 22, 1972, Abdul Baten returned to Bangladesh. After his return, the Baten Bahini surrendered their arms to the Government of Bangladesh—on January 25 at the Nagarpur Dak Bungalow, and on March 7 and 9 at Lauhati School field in Delduar. On February 4, Abdul Baten was given a reception.

== See also ==
- Kader Bahini
- Mujib Bahini
- Latif Bahini
- List of sectors in the Bangladesh Liberation War
