= Khandaker Abu Taher =

Bangladeshi politician

Member of Bangladesh Parliament
- In office 1991–1996
- Preceded by: Noor Muhammad Khan
- Succeeded by: Gautam Chakroborty

Personal details
- Party: Bangladesh Nationalist Party

Khandaker Abu Taher is a Bangladesh Nationalist Party politician and a former member of parliament for Tangail-6.

== Career ==
Taher was elected to parliament from Tangail-6 as a Bangladesh Nationalist Party candidate in 1991.
