= Tangail-6 =

Bangladeshi parliamentary constituency

Coordinates: 24.06°N 89.88°E

- Constituency for the Jatiya Sangsad
- District: Tangail District
- Division: Dhaka Division
- Electorate: 468,076 (2026)

Current constituency
- Created: 1973
- Party: Bangladesh Nationalist Party
- Member: Md. Robiul Awal
- ← 134 Tangail-5 136 Tangail-7 →

Tangail-6 is a constituency represented in the Jatiya Sangsad (National Parliament) of Bangladesh since 2026 by Md. Robiul Awal of the Bangladesh Nationalist Party.

== Boundaries ==
The constituency encompasses Delduar and Nagarpur upazilas.

== History ==
The constituency was created for the first general elections in newly independent Bangladesh, held in 1973.

Ahead of the 2008 general election, the Bangladesh Election Commission redrew constituency boundaries to reflect population changes revealed by the 2001 Bangladesh census. The 2008 redistricting altered the boundaries of the constituency.

== Members of Parliament ==
Election	Member	Party
1973	Abdul Mannan	Awami League
1979	Noor Muhammad Khan	Bangladesh Nationalist Party
Major Boundary Changes
1986	Noor Muhammad Khan	Jatiya Party
1991	Khandaker Abu Taher	Bangladesh Nationalist Party
Feb 1996	Khandaker Abu Taher	Bangladesh Nationalist Party
Jun 1996	Gautam Chakroborty	Bangladesh Nationalist Party
2001	Gautam Chakroborty	Bangladesh Nationalist Party
2008	Khondokar Abdul Baten	Independent
2014	Khondokar Abdul Baten	Awami League
2018	Ahasanul Islam Titu	Awami League
2026	Md. Robiul Awal	Bangladesh Nationalist Party

== Elections ==
=== Elections in the 2020s ===
General Election 2026: Tangail-6
Party	Candidate	Votes	%	±%
BNP	Md. Robiul Awal	150,952	54.3	N/A
Jamaat	A. K. M. Abdul Hamid	91,914	33.1	N/A
Independent	Md. Jewel Sarkar	15,161	5.5	N/A
IAB	Md. Akhinur Mia	12,068	4.3	N/A
Jatiya Party (M)	Tareq Shams Khan	3,489	1.3	N/A
Independent	Muhammad Ashraful Islam	2,996	1.1	N/A
JP(E)	Mohammad Mamunur Rahim	1,166	0.4	N/A
Majority		59,038	21.3	N/A
Turnout		277,746	59.3	N/A
BNP gain from AL				

=== Elections in the 2010s ===
General Election 2014: Tangail-6
Party	Candidate	Votes	%	±%
AL	Khondokar Abdul Baten	66,292	81.9	+50.2
Independent	Kazi ATM Anisur Rahman Bulbul	14,621	18.1	N/A
Majority		51,671	63.9	+46.6
Turnout		80,913	23.3	+6.0
AL gain from Independent				

=== Elections in the 2000s ===
General Election 2008: Tangail-6
Party	Candidate	Votes	%	±%
Independent	Khondokar Abdul Baten	134,297	49.0	N/A
AL	Ahasanul Islam Titu	86,799	31.7	−9.5
BNP	Gautam Chakroborty	45,598	16.7	−26.0
IAB	Md. Akhinur Mia	3,822	1.4	N/A
KSJL	Anwarul Islam Roton	1,731	0.6	−0.5
BDB	Monjur Rashed	870	0.3	N/A
Gano Forum	Mohammad Motasim Billah	714	0.3	N/A
Majority		47,498	17.3	+15.8
Turnout		273,831	87.4	+16.4
Independent gain from BNP				

General Election 2001: Tangail-6
Party	Candidate	Votes	%	±%
BNP	Gautam Chakroborty	55,173	42.7	+5.0
AL	Khondokar Abdul Baten	53,295	41.2	+5.6
Independent	Golam Mohammad Khan	16,462	12.7	N/A
IJOF	Md. Emdad Hossain	2,418	1.9	N/A
KSJL	Arif Khan Yusuf Zye	1,399	1.1	N/A
CPB	Md. Abdur Rouf	309	0.2	N/A
Independent	Md. Masudur Rahman	154	0.1	N/A
Jatiya Janata Party (Nurul Islam)	Md. Golam Mostafa	66	0.1	0.0
Jatiya Party (M)	Md. A. B. M. Borhan Uddin	54	0.0	N/A
Majority		1,878	1.5	−0.6
Turnout		129,330	71.0	+1.0
BNP hold				

=== Elections in the 1990s ===
General Election June 1996: Tangail-6
Party	Candidate	Votes	%	±%
BNP	Gautam Chakroborty	34,279	37.7	−1.1
AL	Khondokar Abdul Baten	32,329	35.6	+14.4
JP(E)	Noor Muhammad Khan	22,138	24.4	+23.6
Jamaat	A. K. M. Abdul Hamid	1,676	1.8	N/A
Zaker Party	Aminur Rahman	195	0.2	−2.1
Independent	Md. Saiful Alam Khan	170	0.2	N/A
Jatiya Janata Party (Nurul Islam)	Md. Golam Mostofa	140	0.1	N/A
Majority		1,950	2.1	−15.5
Turnout		90,927	70.0	+19.7
BNP hold				

General Election 1991: Tangail-6
Party	Candidate	Votes	%	±%
BNP	Khandaker Abu Taher	32,845	38.8	
AL	Abdul Mannan	17,936	21.2	
Independent	Kh. Enamul Kabir Shahid	14,079	16.6	
Jatiya Samajtantrik Dal-JSD	Khondokar Abdul Baten	11,694	13.8	
Independent	Md. Faizul Wara	2,234	2.6	
Zaker Party	Aminur Rahman	1,951	2.3	
Jatiya Oikkya Front	Ali Akbar	1,809	2.1	
CPB	Md. Daudul Islam	1,227	1.5	
JP(E)	Md. Wadur Rahman Khan	703	0.8	
Independent	Mir A. Shahjahan	104	0.1	
Majority		14,909	17.6	
Turnout		84,582	50.3	
BNP gain from JP(E)				
