= Kader Bahini =

Militia in the Bangladesh War of Independence

Kaderia Bahini Force of Kader
- কাদেরিয়া বাহিনী
- Other name: Kader Bahini
- Founding leader: Abdul Kader Siddique
- Military leader: Abdul Kader Siddique
- Civilian chief: Anwar Ul Alam Shaheed
- Founded: 19 April 1971
- Dissolved: 24 January 1972
- Split from: Mukti Bahini
- Allegiance: Bangladesh
- Headquarters: Mohanandapur, Sakhipur, Tangail District
- Newspaper: Ronangon (lit. 'Battlefield')
- Active regions: Tangail, Greater Pabna, Mymensingh, Dhaka
- Ideology: Bengali nationalism Bangladeshi separatism Mujibism
- Anthem: Amar Sonar Bangla (Note: National anthem of Bangladesh)
- Size: December 1971: 17,000 (active personnel); 72,000 (volunteers)
- Wars: Bangladesh Liberation War
- Flag: Flag of Bangladesh, 1971—1972 de facto flag of Mukti Bahini

Kaderia Bahini was an independent militia created during the Bangladesh War of Independence of 1971, the other being Mukti Bahini. It was named after its leader, Kader Siddique.

The militia operated against the Pakistan Army in Tangail. Siddique was wounded at the Makrar battle near Balla village. Kader Bahini is notable for the capture of a Pakistani ship with large quantities of arms and ammunition at Bhuapur. They also captured several armored cars along with bulletproof carriers.

The Kader Bahini fought 73 battles against the Pakistan Armed Forces and collaborators. Kader Bahini killed more than 3,000 Pakistani troops and collaborators, and took more than 10,000 Pakistani troops and Razakar militias as POWs in the entirety of the Bangladesh War of Independence.

== Background ==
A planned military operation carried out by the Pakistan Army – codenamed Operation Searchlight – started on 25 March to curb the Bengali nationalist movement by taking control of the major cities on 26 March, and then eliminating all opposition, political or military, within one month. Before the beginning of the operation, all foreign journalists were systematically deported from East Pakistan.

During the war, there were widespread killings and other atrocities – including the displacement of civilians in East Pakistan and widespread violations of human rights began with the start of Operation Searchlight on 25 March 1971.

== Formation ==
On 1 March 1971, the Tangail district unit of Swadhin Bangla Gono Mukti Parishad was formed. They organised the local youths and provided them with military training. After the launch of operation searchlight, local Mukti Bahini members in Tangail set up blockades on the road to Tangail at Goran-Satiachara in Mirzapur. The Pakistan Army entered Tangail on 3 April, breaking through the blockade. Abdul Kader Siddique who was then a leader of Chhatra League formed the Kader Bahini composed of Mukti Bahini members from Tangail soon after. Naik Habibur Rahman Mia, a veteran (since 1951) of the 2nd East Bengal Regiment and who had been a Weapons Instructor at EBRC, was one of the Company Commanders of the Kaderia Bahini. The in-charge of training was 41 year old Ghatail, Tangail native, retired Subedar Major of the 1st East Bengal Regiment, Khondokar Abu Taher, who was one of the first generation recruits of the 1st East Bengal Regiment in 1949, retired in 1970 as Sub. Maj and had been a Weapons Instructor at PMA Kakul. Lance Naik Mohiuddin and Sepoy Abdul Mazid of East Bengal Regiment were Commando Platoon Leaders. At its height the force had at its disposal more than 15,000 .303 and Chinese Rifles, 2,000 SLRs, 800 LMGs and MMGs, 200 Antitank Rocket Launchers, 80 odd 50 Cal Heavy Machine Guns, 150 60mm mortars, 40 81mm mortars, 12 105 mm Recoilless Guns, and 10 120 mm mortars.

== Area of operations ==
The Kader Bahini operated inside Tangail area and allied with the Afsar Battalion, fought against the Pakistan Armed Forces in Tangail. Throughout the War, the force stayed inside Bangladeshi territory and did not move to India, like many other units of the Mukti Bahini. Kader Siddiqui, the founder and leader of Kader Bahini was himself a native of Tangail.

== Jahazmara battle ==
On 10 August 1971, Kader Bahini in Tangail attacked two ships of the Pakistan army containing arms, ammunition and fuel. The two ships were named ST Razan and SU Engineers LC-3. They were attacked on the convergence point of Jamuna and Dhaleswari Rivers at Sirajkandi. After a brief battle, Kader Bahini emerged victorious. They destroyed the supplies harming the logistics of the Pakistan Army in the region. The Battle came to be known as Jahazmara (Ship Killing). The Public Works Department built a monument near the site of the battle.

== Capture of Tangail ==
On 10 December 1971, 2,000 Indian paratroopers landed in Tangail. They joined up with Kader Bahini. Together they captured Tangail from Pakistani rule. Captain Peter, a Bengali-Indian Army officer had arrived on 3 December to plan the landing of the Indian troops. New Tangail town was the last stronghold of Pakistan to fall in Tangail. Tangail was captured on 11 December 1971.

== Dissolution ==
After the surrender of Pakistan Army on 16 December 1971, Sheikh Mujib was still in Pakistan. He was sentenced to death by a military tribunal. Kader Siddique declared that he and his 50 thousand men would not surrender until Mujib returned. In 1972, after Mujib had returned from Pakistan, Kader and his men surrendered his arms to Mujib on Bindubasini Boys High School in Tangail town.

== Former members ==
- Kader Siddique was the founder of Kader Bahini, which was named after him. He surrendered his weapons to Sheikh Mujib after the war ended. He went underground after Sheikh Mujib was assassinated and carried out attacks against the Khondaker Mostaq Ahmad Administration, In the late 1990s, he formed his own party Krishak Sramik Janata League. He has been its president since its founding.
- Dr. Nuran Nabi worked as a messenger bring ammunition and arms from India in 1971 for the Kader Bahini. He helped plan the landing of Indian paratroopers in Tangail on 11 December 1971. After the war, he pursued a career in Biochemistry and became a lecturer at Dhaka University. He completed his PhD in Japan and joined Colgate toothpaste as a researcher. He wrote a book on the war called "Jonmechi Ei Banglae," or "Born in Bengal".
- Abdul Latif Siddiqui is the elder brother of Kader Siddique. He is former minister in the Awami League government from 2009 to 2015. He was telecommunications and information technology minister and jute and textiles minister. As jute minister, he saw the privatization of state owned jute mills. President Hamid terminated him from his post as telecommunication minister after he made comments on the Muslim Hajj that was seen as derogatory.
- Anwar Ul Alam Shaheed
- Rafiq Azad
- Mamunur Rashid

== See also ==
- Jatiya Rakkhi Bahini
- Mujib Bahini
- Afsar Bahini
