= Mukti Bahini =

Bangladeshi guerrilla movement

- মুক্তিবাহিনী; Liberation Army
- Mukti Bahini Flag
- Leaders: General M. A. G. Osmani, Commander-in-Chief; Major General M. A. Rab, Chief of Staff; Air Vice Marshal A K Khandker, Deputy Chief of Staff
- Dates active: March–December 1971
- Allegiance: Provisional Government of Bangladesh
- Groups: Bangladesh Army ∟ K Force ∟ S Force ∟ Z Force; Bangladesh Navy; Bangladesh Air Force; Bangladesh Rifles; Bangladesh Ansar; Bangladesh Police; Special Guerrilla Forces ∟ Gono Bahini ∟ Mujib Bahini ∟ Kader Bahini ∟ Hemayet Bahini ∟ Afsar Bahini ∟ Baten Bahini ∟ Akbar Bahini ∟ Khalil Bahini ∟ Gafur Bahini ∟ Crack Platoon ∟ NAP–Communist Party–Students' Union
- Headquarters: Mujibnagar, Meherpur (de jure); Calcutta, India (de facto)
- Active regions: East Pakistan
- Ideology: Bengali nationalism Republicanism; Separatism; Factions: Socialism
- Political position: Big tent
- Wars: Bangladesh Liberation War

The Mukti Bahini, (Note: Bengali: মুক্তিবাহিনী, romanised: Muktibāhinī, lit. 'Liberation Army/Force', pronunciation: [ˈmukt̪i ˈbaɦini]) also known as the Mukti Fauj and the Bangladesh Forces, was a big tent armed guerrilla resistance movement consisting of the East Pakistani military personnel, paramilitary personnel and civilians during the Bangladesh Liberation War that turned East Pakistan into Bangladesh in 1971.

On 7 March 1971, Sheikh Mujibur Rahman, the undisputed leader of then East Pakistan, issued a call to the people of East Pakistan to prepare themselves for an all-out struggle. Later that evening resistance demonstrations began, and the West Pakistani military began a full-scale attack with Operation Searchlight killing thousands in the early hours of 26 March 1971, which continued through May 1971. Before his arrest on 26 March, East Pakistani leaders declared the independence of Bangladesh, and ordered the people to engage in all-out war.

A formal military leadership of the resistance was created in April 1971 under the Provisional Government of Bangladesh. The military council was headed by General M. A. G. Osmani and eleven sector commanders. The Bangladesh Armed Forces were established on 4 April 1971. The most prominent divisions of the Mukti Bahini were the Z Force led by Major Ziaur Rahman, the K Force led by Major Khaled Mosharraf and the S Force led by Major K M Shafiullah. Awami League student leaders formed subgroups, including the Mujib Bahini, the Kader Bahini and Hemayet Bahini. The Communist Party of Bangladesh, led by Comrade Moni Singh, and activists from the National Awami Party (Muzaffar) also operated several guerrilla battalions.

Using guerrilla warfare tactics, the Mukti Bahini secured control over large parts of the Bengali countryside. It conducted successful "ambush and sabotage" campaigns, and included the nascent Bangladesh Air Force and the Bangladesh Navy. The Mukti Bahini received training and weapons from India, where people in West Bengal shared a common Bengali ethnic and linguistic heritage with East Pakistan.

During the Indo-Pakistani War of 1971, the Mukti Bahini became part of the Bangladesh-India Allied Forces. It was instrumental in securing the Surrender of Pakistan and the liberation of Dhaka and other cities in December 1971.

== History ==
=== Background ===
East Pakistan campaigned against the usage of Urdu as the sole official language of Pakistan. The Awami League had won the majority in the 1970 Pakistani general election. Sheikh Mujibur Rahman, as the leader of the Awami League, was prevented from forming a government. Bengali was the only language in Pakistan not written in the Persian-Arabic script. The merger of the provinces of West Pakistan into one administrative "unit" caused great suspicion in East Pakistan. Pakistan's unwillingness to give autonomy to East Bengal and Bengali nationalism are both cited as reasons for the separation. The 1970 Bhola Cyclone had caused the death of at least 200,000 and possibly as many as 500,000 people while the infrastructure, transport and other services were severely damaged. The central government of Pakistan was blamed for a slow relief response, which created resentment in the population of East Pakistan. The resentment helped the Awami League to win 167 of the 169 parliamentary seats allocated to East Pakistan which made the Awami League the majority party in the 313 seat parliament of Pakistan. After the 1970 elections, Yahya Khan hoped for a power sharing agreement between Mujib and Bhutto, though talks between them did not result in a solution. Mujib wanted full autonomy, Bhutto advised Yahya to break off talks. On 1 March 1971, General Yahya Khan suspended the National Assembly of Pakistan which was scheduled to be held on 3 March 1971.

On 7 March 1971, Sheikh Mujib made his now famous speech in Ramna Race course (Suhrawardy Udyan) where he declared "The struggle this time is for our freedom. The struggle this time is for our independence". East Pakistan television broadcasters started broadcasting Rabindranath songs, a taboo in Pakistan, while reducing the air-time of shows from West Pakistan. Civilian interaction with the Pakistan Army were decreased and they were increasingly seen as an occupying force, while local contractors stopped providing supplies to the Pakistan Army. The Pakistan Army also tried to disarm and dismiss personnel of Bengali origin in the East Pakistan Rifles, the police and the regular army. The Bengali officers mutinied against the Pakistan Army, and attacked officers from West Pakistan. The Pakistan Army's crackdown on the civilian population contributed to the revolt of East Pakistani soldiers, who escaped to India and formed the main body of the Mukti Bahini. Sheikh Mujib on 26 March 1971 declared the independence of Bangladesh, while Pakistan's president Yahya Khan declared Mujib a traitor during a national broadcast on the same day. The Pakistan Army moved infantry and armoured units to East Pakistan in preparation for the coming conflicts.

=== Early resistance ===
Flag of Bangladesh in 1971, used during the Bangladesh Liberation War.

On 25 March, martial law was declared, Sheikh Mujibur Rahman was arrested and Operation Searchlight started in East Pakistan. Foreign journalists were expelled and the Awami League was banned. Members of the Awami league, the East Pakistan Rifles, the East Bengal Regiment and others thought to be disloyal to Pakistan were attacked by the Pakistan army. The survivors of the attack would form the backbone of the Mukti Bahini. When the Pakistan Army started the military crackdown on the Bengali population, they did not expect prolonged resistance. Five battalions of the East Bengal Regiment mutinied and initiated the war for liberation of Bangladesh.

On 27 March, on behalf of Sheikh Mujibur Rahman, Major Ziaur Rahman declared Bangladesh's independence from Pakistan and fought his way out of Chittagong City with his unit of Bengali soldiers. In Dhaka, West Pakistani forces began the 1971 Bangladesh genocide with the massacre at Dhaka University. Civilians took control of arms depots in various cities and began resisting Pakistani forces with the acquired weapons supply. Chittagong experienced heavy fighting between rebel Bengali military units and Pakistani forces. The Bangladeshi Declaration of Independence was broadcast from Kalurghat Radio Station in Chittagong by Major Rahman on behalf of Sheikh Rahman.

Bengali forces took control of numerous districts in the initial months of the war, including Brahmanbaria, Faridpur, Barisal, Mymensingh, Comilla and Kushtia among others. With the support of the local population, many towns remained under the control of Bengali forces until April and May 1971. Notable engagements during this period included the Battle of Kamalpur, the Battle of Daruin and the Battle of Rangamati-Mahalchari waterway in the Chittagong Hill Tracts.

On 18 April, the Deputy High Commission of Pakistan in Kolkata defected and hoisted the flag of Bangladesh. On 17 April, the Mujibnagar Government was formed.

During May, Foreign Minister Zulfikar Ali Bhutto asked General Yahya Khan to hand over power in West Pakistan to his party. Khan refused on the grounds that doing so would support the view of Mukti Bahini and the Provisional Government of Bangladesh that East Pakistan was a colony of West Pakistan. Tensions were raised when Bhutto told his followers that "by November [he] would either be in power or in jail".

On 9 June, Mukti Bahini members hijacked a car and launched a grenade attack on Dhaka Intercontinental Hotel, the office of the Pro-Junta Morning Post and the house of Golam Azam.

=== July–November ===
==== July ====
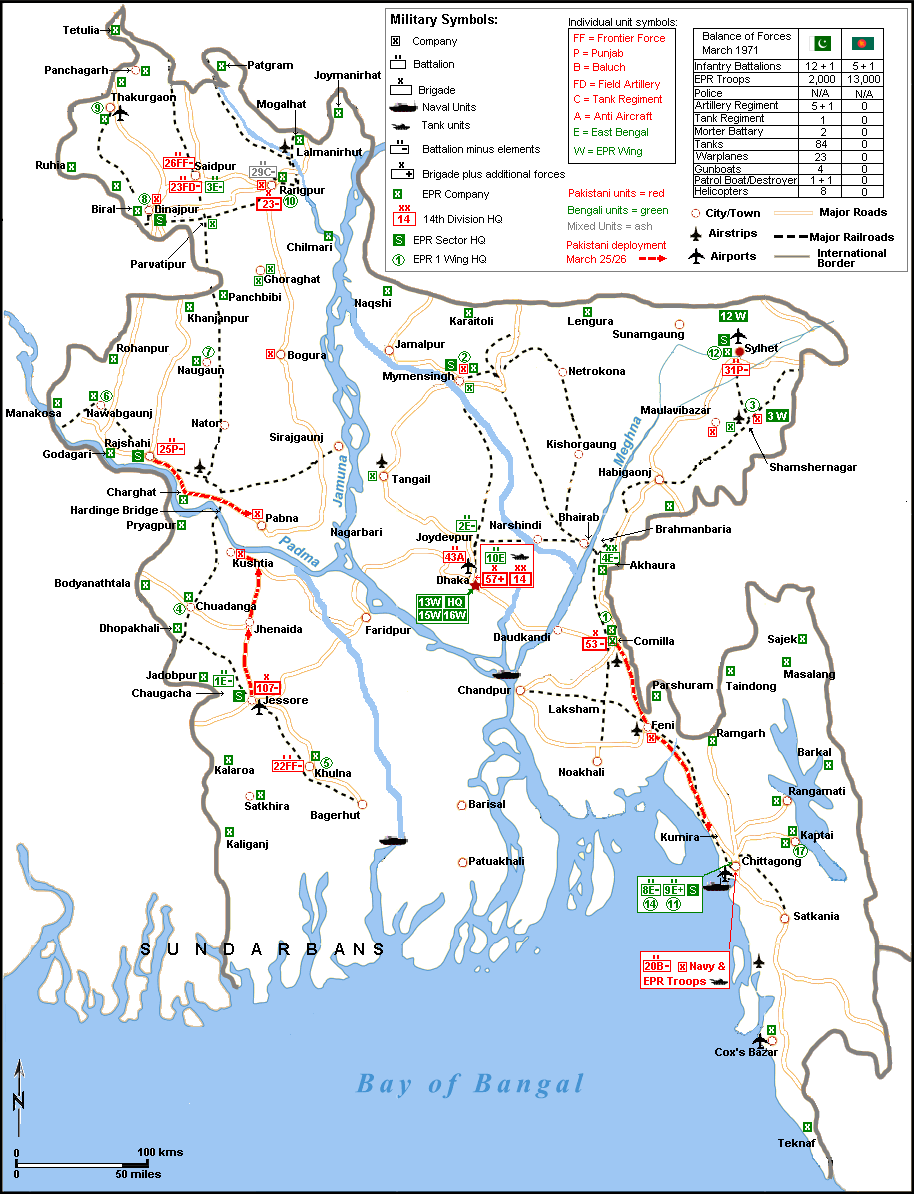
Location of West Pakistani (marked green) and rebel Bangladeshi (marked red) military units in March 1971.

The Mukti Bahini divided the war zone into eleven sectors. The war strategy included a huge guerrilla force operating inside Bangladesh that targeted Pakistani installations through raids, ambushes and sabotaging West Pakistani-controlled shipping ports, power plants, industries, railways and warehouses. The wide dispersion of West Pakistani forces allowed Bengali guerrillas to target smaller groups of enemy soldiers. Groups ranging in size from five to ten guerrillas were assigned specific missions. Bridges, culverts, fuel depots and ships were destroyed to decrease the mobility of the Pakistan Army. However, the Mukti Bahini failed in its Monsoon Offensive after Pakistani reinforcements successfully countered Bengali engagements. Attacks on border outposts in Sylhet, Comilla and Mymensingh had limited success. The training period slowed the momentum of the Bangladesh Forces, which began to pick up after August. After the monsoon, the Mukti Bahini became more effective while the Indian army created a number of bases inside East Pakistan for the Mukti Bahini. The railways in East Pakistan were almost completely shut down due to the Mukti Bahini's sabotage. The provincial capital, Dhaka, had become a ghost town with gun-fire and explosions heard throughout the day.

==== August ====
After a visit to East Pakistan refugee camps in India in August 1971, US Senator Ted Kennedy believed that Pakistan was committing a genocide. Golam Azam called for Pakistan to attack India and to annexe Assam in retaliation for India providing help to the Mukti Bahini. Azam accused India of shelling East Pakistani border areas on a daily basis. Oxfam predicted the deaths of over one hundred thousand children in refugee camps and that more could die from food shortages in East Pakistan because of the conflict.

==== September ====
Regular Mukti Bahini battalions were formed in September 1971, increasing the effectiveness of the Mukti Bahini. Sabotage and ambush missions continued to be carried out, demoralising the Pakistan army.

==== October ====
In October, conventional Bangladesh Forces mounted various successful offensives, capturing 90 of the 300 border outposts. The Mukti Bahini intensified guerrilla attacks inside Bangladesh while Pakistan increased reprisals on Bengali civilians, though the movement of Mukti Bahini into, out of, and inside East Pakistan became easier and more common.

==== November ====
In November, Indian involvement increased, with the Indian artillery and Indian Air force providing direct cover for the Mukti Bahini in some offensives. Attacks on infrastructure and the increase in the reach of the provisional government weakened the control of the Pakistan government.

=== Air operations ===
The Bangladesh Air Force (BAF) was established on 28 September 1971 under the command of Air Commodore A. K. Khandker. It initially operated from a jungle airstrip near Dimapur in Nagaland, India. When taking over liberated territories, the Bangladesh Forces gained control of World War II airstrips in Lalmonirhat, Shalutikar, Sylhet and Comilla in November and December. The BAF launched "Kilo Flights" under the command of Squadron Leader Sultan Mahmud on 3 December 1971. Sorties by Otter DHC-3 aircraft destroyed Pakistani fuel supplies in Narayanganj and Chittagong where targets included the Burmah Oil Refinery, numerous ships and oil depots.

=== Naval operations ===
The Bangladesh naval forces took shape in July. Operation Jackpot was launched by the Bangladesh Forces on 15 August 1971. Bangladesh Navy commandos sank vessels of the Pakistan Navy in Mongla, Chittagong, Chandpur and Narayanganj. The operation was a major propaganda success for Bangladeshi forces, as it exposed to the international community the fragile hold of the West Pakistani occupation. The Bangladesh Navy commandos targeted patrol craft and ships carrying ammunition and commodities. With Indian aid, the Mukti Bahini acquired two vessels, the Padma and Palash, which were retrofitted into gunboats with mine-laying capabilities. The boat crews extensively mined the Passur River in the Sundarbans, reducing the ability of Pakistani forces to operate from the Port of Mongla but were mistakenly bombed by Indian Air Force troops that resulted in the loss of both vessels and some of the lives of the Mukti Bahini and Indian personnel on board. The developing Bangladesh Navy carried out attacks on ships and used sea mines to prevent supply ships from docking in East Pakistani ports. Frogmen were deployed to damage and sabotage ships.

=== Bangladesh-India Allied Forces ===
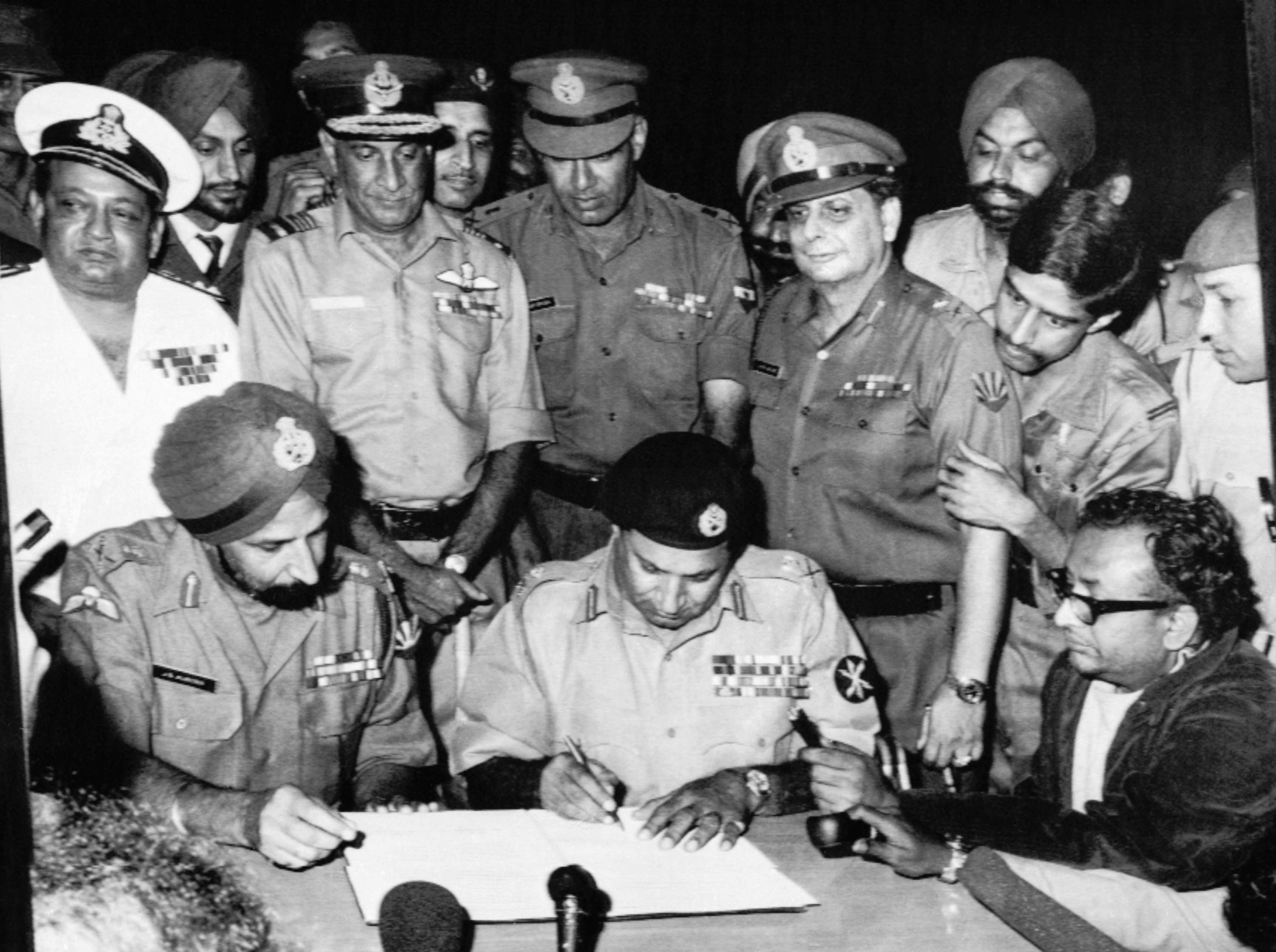
Pakistan's Lt. Gen. A. A. K. Niazi signing the Pakistani Instrument of Surrender in Dhaka on 16 December 1971, in the presence of India's Lt. Gen. Aurora. Standing behind them are various officers from India's Army, Navy and Air Force.

The launch of Operation Chengiz Khan by West Pakistan on North India finally drew India into the Bangladesh conflict and a joint command structure was established between the Bangladeshi and Indian forces. Three corps of the Indian Armed Forces were supported by three brigades of the Mukti Bahini and the Bengali guerrilla army. The Mukti Bahini and its supporters guided the Indian army and provided them with information about Pakistani troop movements. The Indian and Mukti Bahini greatly outnumbered the three Pakistani army divisions of East Pakistan. The Battle of Sylhet, the Battle of Garibpur, the Battle of Boyra, the Battle of Hilli and the Battle of Kushtia were major joint engagements for the Bangladeshi and Indian forces, who swiftly captured surrounding land by selectively engaging or bypassing heavily defended strongholds. For example, the Meghna Heli Bridge airlifted Bangladeshi and Indian forces from Brahmanbaria to Narsingdi over Pakistani defences in Ashuganj. The cities of Jessore, Mymensingh, Sylhet, Kushtia, Noakhali and Moulvibazar quickly fell to the Mukti Bahini-Indian joint forces. In Dhaka, the Pakistan Army and its supporting militias began the mass murder of Bengali intellectuals and professionals in a final attempt to eliminate the Bengali intelligentsia. Historian Yasmin Saikia writes that the Pakistani Army, and pro-Pakistani militias looted, raped, and killed civilians in East Pakistan. The Mukti Bahini liberated most of the Dhaka District by mid-December. In Western Pakistan, Indian forces advanced deep into Pakistani territory as the Port of Karachi was subjected to a naval blockade by the Indian Navy. Pakistani generals surrendered to the Mukti Bahini-Indian forces in Dhaka on 16 December 1971.

== Gafur Bahini ==
Gafur Bahini (Note: Bengali: গফুর বাহিনী, romanised: Gaphura bāhinī) was a militia that was formed in the beginning of the Bangladesh War of Independence. Abdul Gafur, Mohiuddin Manik and Benilal Das Gupta took an initiative to create a force, that would fight Pakistani troops in Barisal, It later on merged with the Force of Captain Shahjahan. Initially, this force was intended to resist Pakistani rule in southern Barisal. Later on, the militia became known as the Gafur Bahini. The group's weapons and ammunition support was given by Abul Hasnat Abdullah and help from commanders of the Kodaldoa Camp which was situated in Agailjhara, Barisal.

Gafur Bahini conducted successful guerilla operations in Banaripara, Jhalakathi, Pirojpur, Swarupkathi and other various areas in Barisal. Gafur Bahini had coordination with the Mujib Bahini and conducted several operations with the Mujib Bahini. According to The Daily Star, when Captain Shahjahan established his sub-sector in the southwestern area of Bangladesh, Gafur Bahini merged with his force. After the war, Abdul Gafur and Mohiuddin Manik were awarded Bir Protik for their contribution.

== Organisation ==
Mukti Bahini propaganda posters, one referencing Sheikh Mujibur Rahman's 7 March speech and calling all Bengali Muslims, Christians, Buddhists and Hindus to unite as one nation.

The "Mukti Bahini" was divided into two groups; the "Niomito Bahini" (lit. 'regular forces') – who came from the paramilitary, military and police forces of East Pakistan, and the Gonnobahini (lit. 'people's forces') – who were civilians. These names were given and defined by the government of Bangladesh. The Indians referred to the Niomito Bahini as "Mukti Fauj", and the Gonnobahini were called "freedom fighters".

M. A. G. Osmani, a Bengali veteran of the British Raj forces in World War II and the Pakistan army, established the Bangladesh Armed Forces on 4 April 1971. The Provisional Government of Bangladesh placed all Bangladeshi forces under the command of Osmani, who was appointed as the defence minister with the rank of Commander-in-Chief as a four star general. Osmani designated the composition of the Mukti Bahini into several divisions. It included the regular armed forces which covered the Army, Navy and Air Forces; as well as special brigades including the Z Force. Paramilitary forces, including the East Pakistan Rifles and police, were designated as the Niyomito Bahini (Regular Forces). They were divided between forward battalions and sector troops. Another civilian force was raised and known as the Gonobahini (People's Forces) consisting of lightly trained civilian brigades under military command; the Gonobahini also consisted of battalions created by political activists from the pro-Western Awami League, the pro-Chinese and socialist National Awami Party, led by Maulana Abdul Hamid Khan Bhashani, and the pro-Soviet Communist Party of East Pakistan.

The guerrilla movement was composed of three wings: well-armed Action Groups which took part in frontal attacks; military intelligence units; and guerrilla bases. The first conference of sector commanders was held during July 1971, starting on 11 July and ending 17 July. Prominent sector commanders included defector officers and soldiers from the Pakistan Armed Forces, including Major Ziaur Rahman, Major Khaled Mosharraf, Major K M Shafiullah, Captain A. N. M. Nuruzzaman, Major Chitta Ranjan Dutta, Wing Commander M Khademul Bashar, Major Nazmul Huq, Major Quazi Nuruzzaman, Major Abu Osman Chowdhury, Major Abul Manzoor, Major M. A. Jalil, Major Abu Taher and Squadron Leader M. Hamidullah Khan. The Mujib Bahini was led by Awami League youth leaders Serajul Alam Khan, Sheikh Fazlul Huq Moni, Tofael Ahmed and Abdur Razzak. An Australian war veteran, William A. S. Ouderland, organised guerrilla warfare in Dacca and provided vital intelligence to the Bangladesh Forces. He was awarded the Bir Protik for his actions by the government of Bangladesh. Left-wing politicians Kader Siddique, Hemayet Uddin and Moni Singh created several guerrilla units. Kader Siddique operated in the Tangail District. Hemayet was a former soldier in East Pakistan and his Bahini was raised almost entirely on local supplies.

The Independent Bangladesh Radio Station was one of the cultural wings of the Mukti Bahini. The Mukti Bahini operated field hospitals, wireless stations, training camps and prisons.

== Equipment ==
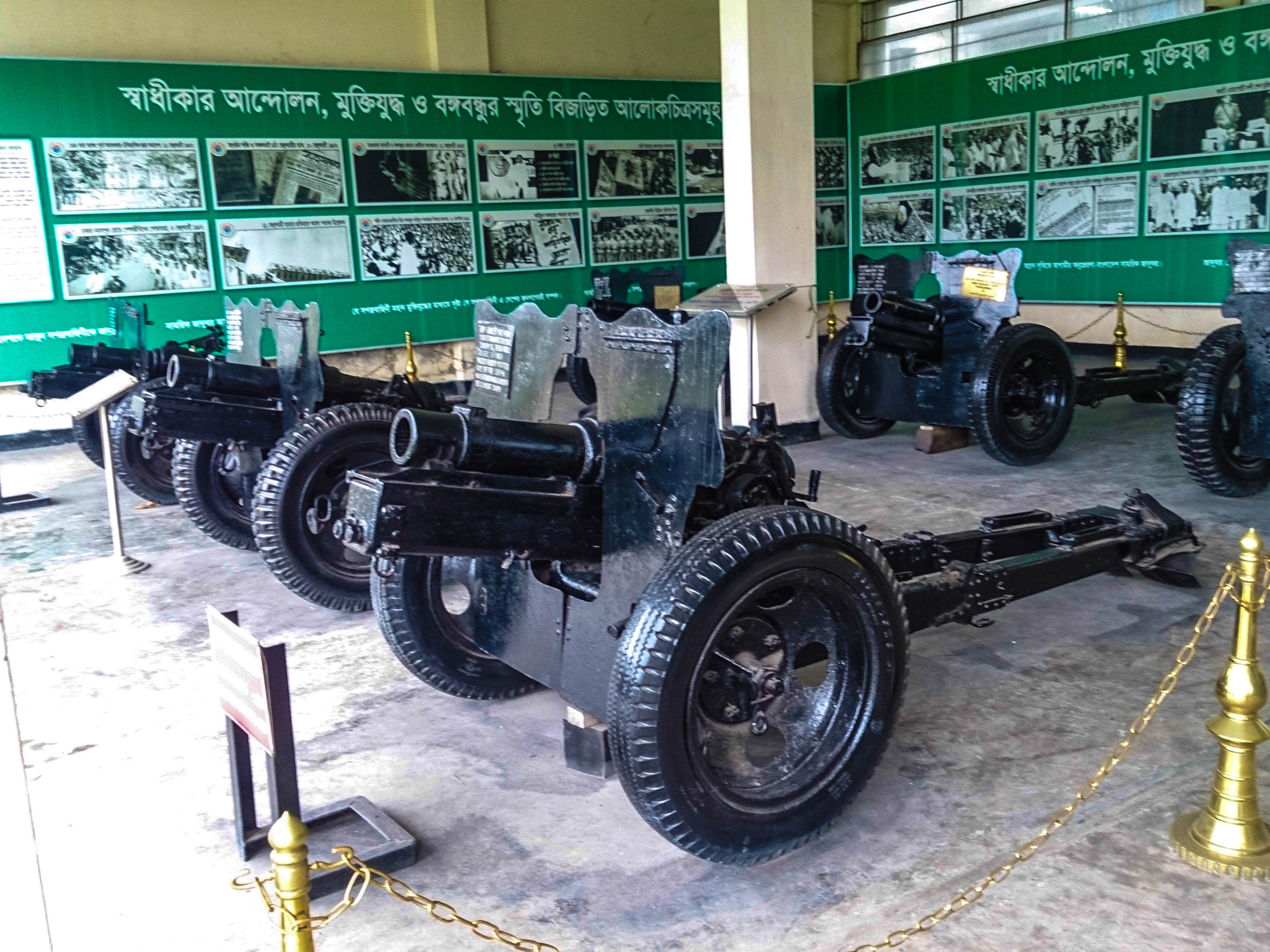
Italian howitzers used by the Mujib Battery; now preserved at the Bangladesh Military Museum.

The Mukti Bahini benefited from the early control of Pakistani arms depots, which were overtaken by Bengali forces during March and April 1971. The Mukti Bahini purchased large quantities of military-grade equipment through the arms market in Calcutta, including Italian howitzers, Alouette III helicopters, Douglas DC-3 and Otter DHC-3 aircraft. The Mukti Bahini also received a limited supply of equipment from the Indian military, as New Delhi allowed the Bangladeshi forces to operate an independent weapons supply through Calcutta Port. The Mukti Bahini used Sten Guns, Lee–Enfield rifles and Indian-made hand grenades. Some of the arms and equipment used by Mukti Bahini are given below:

- Smith & Wesson Model 10 Revolver
- SKS rifle
- British L1A1 SLR rifle (Mostly obtained from India)
- Sterling submachine gun
- Type 56 assault rifle
- Lee-Enfield .303 Rifle
- British Sten sub-machine gun
- HE-36 Grenade
- MG 42 Machinegun
- QF 3.7-inch Mountain Howitzer
- Bren gun
- British Lewis .303 Machine gun
- 120mm Heavy Mortar
- ZB-53 Czechoslovak machine gun
- G3
- Type 53 machine gun
- M40 recoilless rifle
- ENERGA anti-tank rifle grenade
- M18 Recoilless Rifle
- Tula Tokarev 33 Pistol,
- Italian 9mm 3842 Beretta Model 38 Sub-machine gun
- SA 44 Rifle

== International reactions ==
The genocide by Pakistani forces caused widespread international outrage against West Pakistan. In the United States, Democratic senator Ted Kennedy led a chorus of strong domestic criticism against the Nixon administration for ignoring the genocide of Bengalis in East Pakistan.

The Mukti Bahini enjoyed significant international public support. The Bangladeshi provisional government considered setting up an "International Brigade" with European and North American students. French Minister of Cultural Affairs André Malraux vowed to fight on the battlefield alongside the Bangladesh Forces.

The Soviet Union threw its weight behind the Bangladesh Forces and India after being convinced of Pakistan's unwillingness for a political solution. Separately, US efforts to woo China through Pakistan led to India signing a friendship treaty with Moscow in August 1971. India increased support to Mukti Bahini after the signing of the treaty. For India, the treaty was an important insurance policy against a possible Chinese intervention on the side of Pakistan. China had fought a brief war with India in 1962. Both the US and China, however, ultimately failed to mobilise adequate support for Pakistan.

=== India ===
Ten million Bengali refugees fled into neighbouring India because of famine and ravages of the Pakistan army, where the regions of West Bengal, Tripura and the Barak Valley shared strong ethnic, linguistic and cultural links with East Pakistan. The war sparked an unprecedented level of unity in the Bengali-speaking world. There was strong support for Bengalis and Mukti Bahini from the Indian media and public. India feared that if the movement for Bangladesh came to be dominated by communists then it would adversely affect its own fight with the left-wing Naxalites. It also did not want the millions of refugees to be permanently stranded in India.

Indian Prime Minister, Indira Gandhi, authorised diplomatic, economic and military support to the Bangladesh Forces in April 1971. The Provisional Government of Bangladesh established its secretariat in exile in Calcutta. The Indian Armed Forces provided substantial training and the use of its bases for the Bangladesh Forces. The Bangladesh liberation guerrillas operated training camps in the Indian states of Bihar, Arunachal Pradesh, Assam, Nagaland, Mizoram, Meghalaya, Tripura and West Bengal. Mukti Bahini were allowed by India to cross the border at will.

Some Mukti Bahini, especially those who served in the security services of Pakistan, were suspicious of Indian involvement and wished to minimise its role. They also resented the formation of the Mujib Bahini by India which was composed of Sheikh Mujib-loyalists but was not under the command of Mukti Bahini or the provisional government of Bangladesh.

On 6 December 1971, India officially recognised Bangladesh as an independent country only hours after Bhutan did the same.

== Women ==
Women had served in the Mukti Bahini during the Bangladesh Liberation War. The Mukti Bahini trained several female battalions for guerrilla warfare. Taramon Bibi is one of the two female war heroes of the Bangladesh Liberation War. Captain Sitara Begum is noted for setting up field hospitals for injured Mukti Bahini fighters. Professor Nazma Shaheen, University of Dhaka, and her sister were female members in the Mukti Bahini.

== Post-war ==
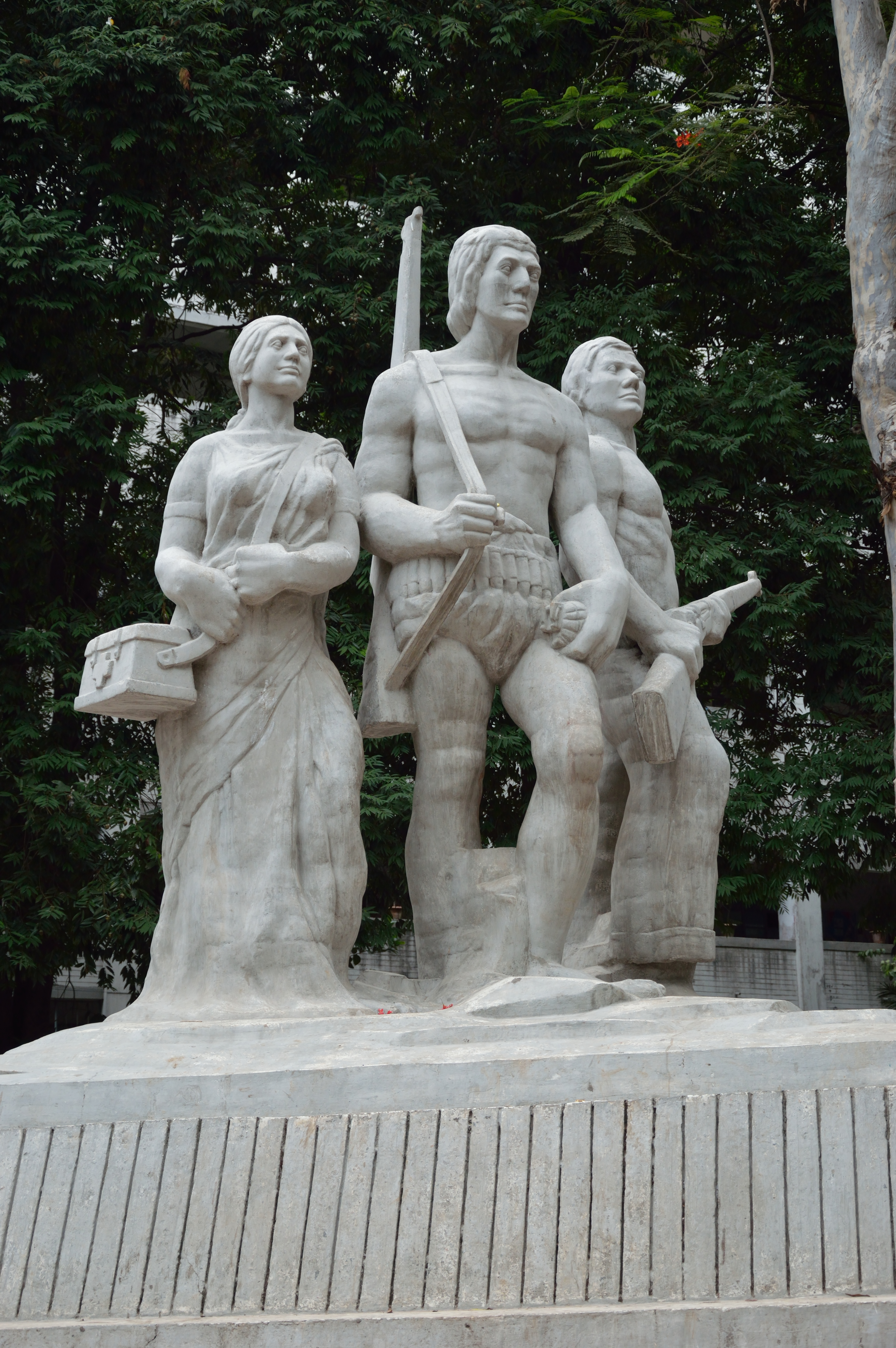
Aparajeyo Bangla (Unvanquished Bengal) was finished on 16 December 1978 by Syed Abdullah Khalid at University of Dhaka Campus, is a Monument to Mukti Bahini.

The Mukti Bahini was succeeded by the Bangladesh Armed Forces, the Bangladesh Rifles and the Bangladesh Police. Civilian fighters were provided with numerous privileges, including reservations in government jobs and universities. The Bangladesh Freedom Fighters Assembly was formed to represent former guerrillas. Bangladesh Liberation War ministry is responsible for looking after the welfare of Mukti Bahini members. The widespread availability of arms created serious law and order concerns for the Bangladesh government after the war. A few militia units are alleged to have taken part in reprisal attacks against the Urdu-speaking population following the Pakistani surrender.

=== Indemnity ===
On 28 February 1973 the government of Bangladesh enacted the National Liberation Struggle (Indemnity) Order to provide indemnity "to those persons in respect of acts done in connection with the national liberation struggle, the maintenance or restoration of order" which was to be enforced retrospectively from 26 March 1972.

== Criticism ==
=== Human rights violations ===
The Mukti Bahini has been accused of human rights violations by historians on West Pakistanis and Biharis.

On 27 March 1971, members of the Mukti Bahini were alleged to have massacred 15000 Biharis in the town of Santahar in the district of Naogaon. They are also accused of raping Bihari women during the war.

== Legacy ==
=== Cultural ===
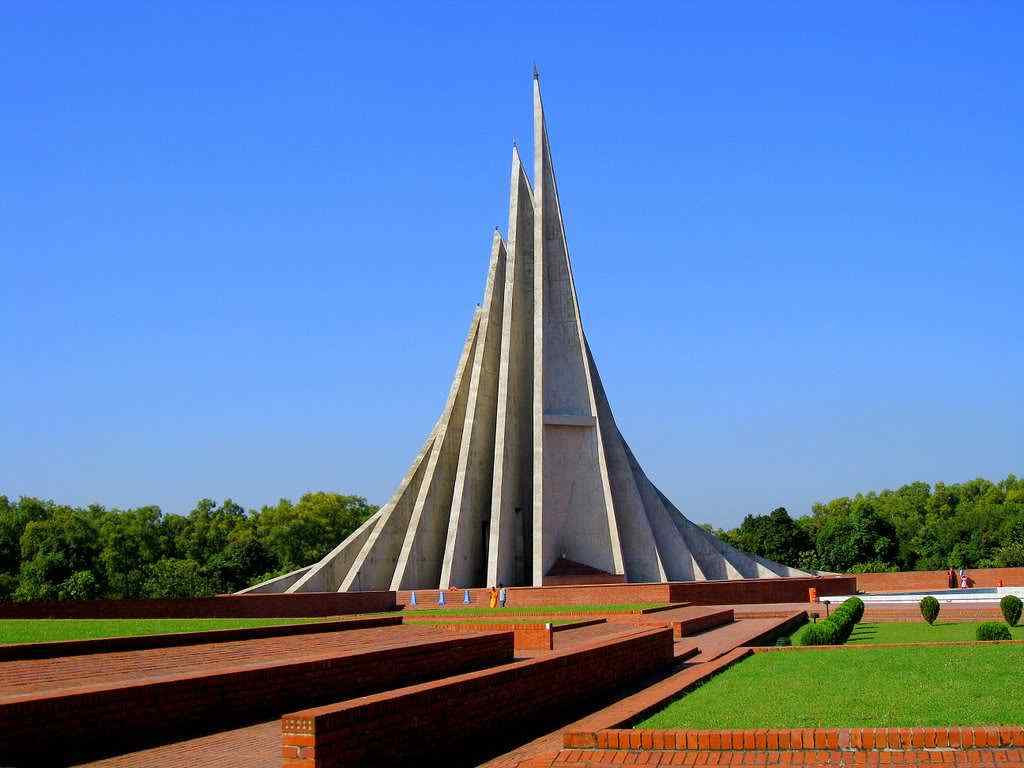
The National Martyrs' Memorial in Bangladesh

The Mukti Bahini has been the subject of numerous artwork, literature, films and television productions.

=== Honours ===
Bir Sreshtho (The Most Valiant Hero) is the highest military honour in Bangladesh and was awarded to seven Mukti Bahini fighters. They were Ruhul Amin, Mohiuddin Jahangir, Mostafa Kamal, Hamidur Rahman, Munshi Abdur Rouf, Nur Mohammad Sheikh and Matiur Rahman.

The other three gallantry awards in decreasing order of importance are Bir Uttom, Bir Bikrom and Bir Protik.

In the Section 2(11) of the Bangladesh Freedom Fighters Welfare Trust Act, 2018 (Act No. 51 of 2018) everyone participated in the liberation war is defined as Bir Muktijoddha (Bengali: বীর মুক্তিযোদ্ধা). The government issued an order by gazette notification on 29 October 2020 saying that the word Bir (heroic) will have to be added to the term freedom fighter. To compulsorily comply with the law, in the 13th meeting of the Standing Committee, the Ministry of Liberation War Affairs of the 11th National Parliament issued another order by gazette notification on 18 December 2021 stating that the word Bir (heroic) must be used as an honorific prefix before the names of freedom fighters and the English synonym for Bir Muktijoddha will be Heroic Freedom Fighter.

== See also ==
- Timeline of Bangladesh Liberation War
