= Ahasanul Islam Titu =

Bangladeshi Politician

- আহসানুল ইসলাম টিটু
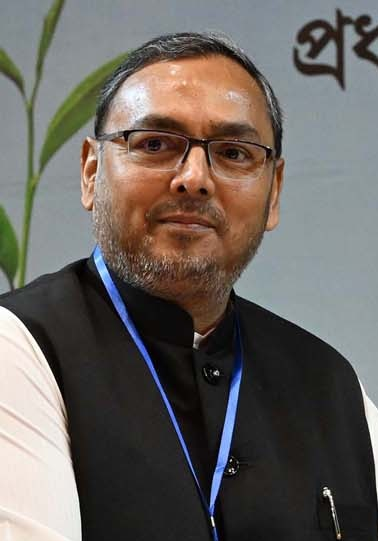
- Titu in 2024

Minister of State for Commerce
- In office 11 January 2024 – 6 August 2024
- Prime Minister: Sheikh Hasina
- Preceded by: Tipu Munshi

Member of the Bangladesh Parliament for Tangail-6
- In office 29 January 2019 – 6 August 2024
- Preceded by: Khandaker Abdul Baten

Personal details
- Born: 11 December 1969 (age 56) Tangail, East Pakistan, Pakistan
- Party: Bangladesh Awami League
- Education: Assumption University; Pittsburg State University

Ahasanul Islam Titu (born 11 December 1969) is a Bangladesh Awami League politician and a former Jatiya Sangsad member representing the Tangail-6 constituency. In January 2024, he was appointed the state minister of commerce.

== Education ==
Titu graduated from Assumption University (Thailand) with a BBA degree and got an MBA from Pittsburg State University, US, in 1993.

== Career ==
Titu was elected to parliament from Tangail-6 as a Bangladesh Awami League candidate on 30 December 2018. Titu was the founding president of the Dhaka Stock Exchange's Brokerage Association.

== Associations ==
Titu is a businessman who has a long history of involvement in the financial sector of Bangladesh. In 1998 he was the convener of "DSE Automation Process Committee" and automation of Dhaka Stock Exchange trading started on 10 August 1998. From 2005 to 2010 he was a member of the executive committee of the Bangladesh Insurance Association (BIA) and in 2012 was the vice president of BIA.

Titu was elected as the president of Dhaka Stock Exchange on 15 June 2013. Prior to that, he held the position of senior vice president of DSE from 16 March 2011, to 15 March 2012, after being elected director on 16 March 2011, for the third time. Before that he held the position of vice chairman of DSE from 30 March 2000, to 29 March 2001, and from 18 December 1997, to 30 March 2000, he was the councillor of DSE.
