= Akbar Bahini =

Volunteer force during the Bangladesh War of Independence

- আকবর বাহিনী
- Other name: Sreepur Bahini
- Founder: Akbar Hossain Miah
- Leader: Akbar Hossain Miah Mollah Nabuwat Ali
- Dates active: 1971
- Allegiance: Bangladesh
- Active regions: Bangladesh
- Status: Dissolved
- Size: 800
- Wars: Bangladesh War of Independence

Akbar Bahini (also known as Sreepur Bahini) (Note: Bengali: আকবর বাহিনী, romanized: Ākabara bāhinī) was a volunteer force during the Bangladesh War of Independence. Akbar Hossain Miah was the Chairman of Srikul Union in Sreepur Thana of Magura District. Immediately after the outbreak of war in East Pakistan, Akbar Hossain devoted himself in organising a group of fighters. The majority of the members of Akbar Bahini were extracted from amongst the locals of Sreepur area, but also included members of the East Pakistan Rifles. Akbar Hossain Miah, formed a group of fighters called 'Akbar Bahini'. Akbar Hossain was the commander, and Mollah Nabuwat Ali was its deputy commander.

== History ==
Akbar Bahini caused immense damage and inflicted heavy casualties to the Pakistan Army. The group fought in the battles of Alkapur and Sreepur, they launched an attack on Isakhada Razakar camp, Magura Ansar camp, and battles of Mashlia, Boroipara, Khamarpara, Bakol, Magura, Jessore and Faridpur, Even though the Akbar Bahini fought independently, they had good coordination with officers of Sector 8 of the Mukti Bahini.

the volunteer force reportedly had around 800 fighters. a few were killed in an operation which was conducted in October 1971, to capture Ranger and Razakar Camp in Magura, the position was not captured, but Pakistan forces suffered heavy casualties. the group waged successful campaigns and operations against Pakistani forces in Greater Jessore and Faridpur. the group captured Magura on December 7, 1971.

== See also ==
- Sreepur Upazila, Magura
