= Hemayet Bahini =

Militia in the Bangladesh Liberation War

- হেমায়েত বাহিনী
- Other name: Force of Hemayet
- Founder: Mohammad Hemayet Uddin
- Dates active: 1971
- Active regions: Bangladesh
- Status: Dissolved

Hemayet Bahini (Bengali: হেমায়েত বাহিনী; The Hemayet Force) was a guerrilla militia force of Bangladesh in the Bangladesh Liberation War of 1971. This small force was known by the name of its leader and organizer Mohammad Hemayet Uddin Bir Bikrom.

The area of operation of Hemayet Bahini was the Faridpur zone. Although Hemayet Uddin was a Havildar of the East Bengal Regiment of Pakistan army, his force was composed mostly of local youth. This guerrilla force used the riverine terrain to its advantage and disrupted the movement of Pakistan armed forces in the region.

Hemayet Bahini was very popular among the Bengalis and stories about their work reached mythic proportions. Hemayet Uddin, the leader, was affectionately addressed by the Mukti bahini headquarters as Himu. After the war, he was decorated by the gallantry award Bir Bikrom and was awarded the military rank of Subedar.

In 2020, the Government of Bangladesh built a museum in Gopalganj District dedicated to Hemayet Bahini and its contribution to Bangladesh Liberation war.
