= Khalil Bahini =

Militia during the Bangladesh War of Independence

- খলিল বাহিনী
- Dates active: 1971
- Country: Bangladesh
- Size: 400

Khalil Bahini (Note: Bengali: খলিল বাহিনী, romanized: Khalila bāhinī) was a militia during the Bangladesh War of Independence.

== Formation ==
Initially on 17 April 1971, 165 fighters went to India for military training including many who would later be part of this militia. Khalilur Rahman Khan led an armed group to enter Madaripur, 2 of the group's fighters were arrested during the attempt, Khalilur Rahman went to India for the second time and then re-entered Madaripur with a group of 20 members, led by Taslim Howladar, This militia changed positions multiple times, After the militia increased strength, Khalilur Rahman entered India for the third time, After his arrival was delayed, Alamgir Hossain led a force of 400 fighters, which was named as the Khalil Bahini. After a rumour, that Khalilur Rahman died, while returning home. Khalilur Rahman eventually returned home alive on 15 August 1971 but the name of the militia did not change. The group eventually became larger.

== Military engagements ==
Khalil Bahini raided, ambushed and fought and conducted operations against Pakistani troops in various areas, most notably, In Madaripur, Ukilbari Bridge, Charmugaria Jute Warehouse, Chokdar Bridge, Kamalapur, Kalagachia, Kalabari, Kalabari Bridge, Samaddar Bridge and targeted Razakar-Al Badr positions in Ghatakchar Bridge, Siddikkhola Bridge, Samaddar Bridge, Ghatakchar Razakar Camp and Amgram Bridge, Power Plant Brick Pool and attacked Shanti Committee member Rahmat Darji, At one-point, Khalil Bahini attacked the Pakistan Army Headquarters in AR Howladar Jute Mills using mortars. On 10 December 1971, 40-70 Pakistani troops including 14 Razakars surrendered to Khalil Bahini. 53 pro-independence fighters were killed in aftermath of the battle with Pakistani troops and local East Pakistani collaborators near the Samaddar Bridge in Madaripur-Takerhat Road.

== See also ==
- List of sectors in the Bangladesh Liberation War
