= List of educational institutions in Noakhali =

List of educational institutions

This is a list of educational institutions in Noakhali District, Bangladesh. Noakhali is the south coastal district of Bangladesh. Many public and private educational institutions are situated here.

== Higher secondary schools ==
There are nine higher secondary schools in the district.

=== Kabirhat Upazila ===
- Kabirhat government college
- Chaprashirhat Islamia Degree College

=== Begumganj Upazila ===
- Sultanpur Hanif Bhuiyan School and College

=== Chatkhil Upazila ===
- Hirapur Ideal High School and College
- Shahapur M.L.High School.Shahapur

=== Companiganj Upazila ===
- Companiganj Government College
- Hazari Hat High School and B. M. College

=== Hatiya Upazila ===
- Tamaraddi High School and College

=== Noakhali Sadar Upazila ===
- Aswadia Girls' School and College (1975)
- Noakhali Residential School and College
- Noakhali Biggan College

=== Senbagh Upazila ===
- Senbag Government Pilot High School, Noakhali.
- Batakandi Adarsha School and College (1993)

=== Subarnachar Upazila ===
- Hazi Mosharef Hossan School and College
- Purba Charbata High School and College

== Secondary schools ==
=== Begumganj Upazila ===
- A. K. G. Sayedul Hoque Adarsha High School
- Shaheed Aman Ullah Public High School, Alaiyarpur, kazir Hat
- Babupur Jirtoli Union High School (1928)
- Baluchara Ibrahim Mia High School
- Begumganj Government Pilot High School, Chowmuhani
- Begumgonj Government Technical High School
- Chandragonj High School
- Chaumuhani Modan Mohan High School, Chowmuhani
- Chhayani Girls' High School
- Chhayani High School
- Darul Islam Model Academy, Chowmuhani
- Delta Jute Mill's High School, Chowmuhani
- Dewan Golam Sarwar (N. A.) High School
- Durgapur High School (1937)
- Eklashpur High School
- Ganipur Pilot Girls' High School, Chowmuhani
- Ghatla Abdur Rob High School
- Ghatla High School (1915)
- Gopalpur Ali Haidar High School
- Hasan Hat High School
- Hazipur Abdul Mazid High School (1928)
- Jamidar Hat B. N. High School
- Janakallan Adarsha High School
- Jirtali Union High School
- Kadirpur High School (1915)
- Kalikapur Babupur Union High School (1929)
- Khurshida Girls' High School
- Krishnarampur High School
- Kutubpur Adarsha High School
- Lakshminarayanpur High School
- Latifpur High School
- Lautoli High School
- Mirkashem Bohumukhi High School (1948)
- Mirwarishpur Girls' High School
- Narottampur Union High School
- Noakhali Public High School
- North East Aklaspur Harun Or Rashid High School
- Ovirampur Afazia Girls' High School
- Rajgonj Union High School
- Shaheed Aman Ullah Public High School
- Shamsunnahar High School
- Shibpur Adarsha High School
- Sonapur Nurul Islam High School (1968)
- Taker Bazar High School (2013)
- Zainul Abedin Memorial Academy

=== Chatkhil Upazila ===
- Badal Kote High School
- Bhimpur ML High School (1919)
- Chatkhil Government Girls' High School (1969)
- Chatkhil Panch Gaon Government High School (1907)
- Chyani Tobga Azam Girls' High School (1974)
- Darul Islam Girls' High School
- Faorah High School
- Hat Pukuria High School
- Jib Nagar ML High School
- Kamalpur M. H. High School
- Karihati ML High School
- Khilpara ML High School (1914)
- Malliker Dighirpar High School
- Narayan Pur R. K. High School
- Omar Ali High School
- Palla Mahbub Adarsha High School
- Panch Gaon Girls' High School
- Parkote Dashgoria Union High School
- Ramnarayanpur High School
- Saptagaon Adarsha High School
- Shahapur ML High School
- Shing Bahura Girls' Academy
- Sompara Girls' High School
- Sompara High School
- Taltala Adarsha Girls' High School

=== Companiganj Upazila ===
- Abu Mazir Hat High School
- Abunaser Chowdhury Poura High School
- Achia Carman Girls' High School
- Bamni High School (1914)
- Basurhat A. H. C. Government High School (1911)
- Char Elahi High School
- Char Parbati Meherunnesha High School (1948)
- Char Parbati S. C. High School
- Charfakira High School
- Charkakra Academy High School
- Chowdhuryhat B. Zaman High School (1959)
- Companigonj Model High School
- Dhoni Para Junior School
- Gangchil Kabi Nazrul Junior High School
- Jogadia Girls' High School
- Jogida High School
- Kabijasim Uddin High School
- Madhya Charkakra High School
- Madhya Purva Charkakra High School
- Manikpur High School
- Maqsudah Government Girls' High School
- Mukti Joddah Shahid Kamal Secondary High School
- Musapur High School
- Naser High School (1988)
- Nurjahan Ajmat Chowdhurany Girls' High School
- Pashchim Charkakra Panditer Hat Secondary School
- Peshker Hat High School
- Rongmala Adarsha High School
- Santir Hat Moudud Ahamed Junior High School
- Shahjad Pur High School
- Shohid Muktijudda A. S. I. High School
- Sirajpur High School (1966)
- Sirajpur P. L. Academy

=== Hatiya Upazila ===
- A. Goni Girls' High School
- A. M. High School
- Azmeri Begum High School
- Birbiri Centre Bazar High School
- Boaliya High School
- Burir Char Syedia High School
- Burirchar Saheed Ali Ahmed Memorial High School
- Char Amanullah High School
- Char Iswar Roy Afazia High School
- Char Iswar Roy Dashar Hat High Sclhoo
- Char King Girls' High School
- Char King High School
- Choumuhani High School
- Hatiya Janakallan Shikkah Trust High School
- Hatiya Town Government Girls' High School
- Hatiya Union Model Pilot High School (1912)
- Jahajmara High School
- Jorekhali High School
- M. C. S. High School
- Maijdee High School
- Nanda Kumar Girls' High School
- Oskhali K. S. S. Government High School
- Oskhali S. T. Girls' High School
- Rehania Junior High School
- Sonadia Adarsh High School
- Sukchar Union Bang Bandhu High School
- Sukhchar Mofizia High School

=== Kabirhat Upazila ===
- Abdur Rahim High School
- Algi Bazar High School
- Baktarunnesa Girls' High School (1985)
- Bandatta High School
- Banga Bandhu Shek Mujibur Rahman Junior High School
- Bataiya Moudud Ahammed High School (1972)
- Bhuiyar Hat High School (1960)
- Chaprashir Hat High School (1913)
- Goshbag Kaderia High School (1967)
- Hazihat Hamedia High School (1960)
- KabirHat Government Model High School (1938)
- Kalamunshi High School
- Karam Box Adarsha High School (1993)
- Lamchi Prosad High School
- Mearhat High School
- Mosaref Hossain High School
- Naba Gram High School
- Nolua Bhuiyar Hat High School (1995)
- Oterhat High School
- Rameshwarpur M. M. High School (1971)
- Sadar Narottampur High School (1942)
- Tajul Islam Model Academy High School
- Uttar Rameshwarpur Jr. High School

=== Noakhali Sadar Upazila ===
- Adarsho Uchha Bidyalaya
- Ahmadia Model High School (1906)
- Al Madina Academy High School
- Al-Farooq Academy
- Arun Chandra High School, Maijdee (1914)
- Benodpur High School
- Bhater Tak High School
- Brother Andre High School (1857)
- Char Matua Pre-Cadet Academy
- Charkawnia Anwar Hossain High School
- Collegiate School, Sonapur
- Dharampur Hajeerhat High School
- Feroj Sha Maiz Vandary High School
- Gouripur Girls' High School
- Harinarayan Pur Union High School
- Ishaqpur Major Manan High School
- Islamgonj Janata High School
- Jamidar Hat High School
- Kali Tara Muslim Girls' Achdemy
- Karmulla High School
- Khalifar Hat High School
- M. A. Rasid Girls' High School
- M. A. Sattar High School
- Maijdee Balika Bidya Nikaton, Maijdee
- Maijdee Girls' Academy
- Mohabbatpur Girls' High School
- Motipur Model High School
- Mridhar Hat High School
- Nalpur High School
- Neazpur Union ML High School
- Noakhali Bangla Bazar High School
- Noakhali Government Girls' High School (1934)
- Noakhali High School
- Noakhali Union High School
- Noakhali Zilla School (1853)
- Noannai Union High School
- Obaid Ullah Memorial High School
- Pana Mea T. F. Hgih School
- Paura Kalyan High School (1940)
- Ramballavpur High School
- Saidul Haque High School
- Santir Hat High School
- Shibpur Muslim High School
- Thakeer Hat Hazi Ahamed Ullah High School
- West Charuria Model High School
- West Ewazbali Junior High School

=== Senbagh Upazila ===
- Bejoybagh Nabakrishna High School (1939)
- Chandpur Model High School
- Chaterpaiya High School
- Domurua Z. A. Chowdhury Girls' High School (1994)
- Earpur High School
- Gazirhat High School (1974)
- Hazi Moksudur Rahman Muslim High School
- Joy Nagar High School
- Kankir Hat Girls' High School
- Kankirhat Bohumukhi High School
- Khajuria Asira Khatun High School
- Kutuber Hat T. A. High School
- Lemua High School
- M. M. Chowdhury Memorial High School
- M. A. Ali High School
- Mohammadpur Ramendra Model High School (1916)
- Nabipur Girls' High School (1985)
- Nabipur High School
- Nolua Adarsha High School (1990)
- Porikot High School (1985)
- Senbag Government Pilot High School (1940)
- Senbag Government Girls' High School
- Sher-E-Bangla High School
- Shilonia Union High School (1952)
- Sreeponddi Model High School (1995)
- Tamuhani Abdur Rashid Bauiyn High School (1974)
- Tunku Abdul Rahman Memorial Academy
- Universal Academy, Senbagh

=== Sonaimuri Upazila ===
- Abirpara Madhyamic Bidya Niketan
- Amber Nagar High School
- Amirabad High School
- Amisha Para Krishak High School
- Bazra ML High School (1919)
- Bhuiyar Bazar Hanufa Khatun High School
- Bir Srestha Shahid Ruhul Amin Academy
- Chongow Girls' High School
- Flora Shikkha Niketon
- Gandhi Memorial Institute
- Joyag Bohumukhi High School
- Kalikapur High School, Sonaimuri
- Kashipur High School
- Keshar Khil Girls' High School
- Khalilur Rahman High School
- Mahbuben Nesa Girls' High School
- Morshid Alam High School
- Muhurigonj Abdul Matin Patowari High School
- Nadona Adarsha High School
- Nandia Para High School
- Nateswar Abul Khair High School
- Nazrul Academy High School
- Nilamhat Adarsha High School
- Palli Mangal High School
- Pitamber Pur High School
- Rajibpur High School
- Rashidpur High School
- Rubirhat Bangabandhu High School
- Soheed Mukttizodha Ideal High School
- Sonaimuri Girls' High School
- Sonaimuri Model High School
- Sonapur Ali Akber High School
- Thanar Hat High School
- Udayan School
- Wasekpur High School

=== Subarnachar Upazila ===
- Char Clerk High School
- Char Aman Ullah High School
- Char Aman Ullah Model High School
- Char Bata Sowdagorhat High School
- Char Bata Girls' High School
- Char Hasan Bhuiyarhat High School
- Char Mazid Sesdp Model High School
- Charbata Khasherhat High School
- Charbata R. G. High School
- Jublie Habib Ullah Miar Hat High School
- Karamat Pur Bagar High School
- Keramotpur M. S. High School
- Lord Leonard Cheshire High School
- Shahid Joynal Abedin High School
- Somirhat Madhamic Girls' School
- Thanar Hat Model High School

== Madrasahs and specialized institutions ==
- Chatkhil Government Technical School and College
- Maijdi Government Technical School and College
- V.V.T.C. Technical School
- Agriculture Training Institute (ATI), Begumganj
- Noakhali Medical Assistant Training School
- Noakhali Paramedical College
- Rabeya Nursing Institute
- Bamni Asiria Fazil/Degree Madrasah, Bamnia, Rampur
- Noakhali Islamia Alia Madrasa, Sonapur
- Noakhali Karamatia Kamil Madrasha
- Bosontobug Islamia Fazil Madrasha
- Bamni Asiria Fazil Madrasah
- Kashipur Fazil Madrasah, Sonaimuri, Noakhali
- Chachua Hazi Ali Akbar Alim Madrasha, Senbag, Noakhali

== See also ==
- Education in Bangladesh
- List of schools in Bangladesh
- List of colleges and universities in Noakhali District
