= Agriculture Training Institute =

Bangladeshi technical college, est. 1947

Coordinates: 22.9415°N 91.1015°E

Agriculture training institute, Noakhali
- কৃষি প্রশিক্ষন ইনষ্টিটিউট, নোয়াখালী
- Other names: ATI Noakhali
- Motto: God give us knowledge প্রভু জ্ঞান দাও
- Established: 1947
- Principal: Dr. Mozammal Hossain (acting)
- Students: 1500+
- Location: Chowrasta, Begumganj Upazila, Noakhali, Chittagong, 3820, Bangladesh
- Campus: 52 acres; Urban
- Language: Bengali
- Colors: Navy blue, white
- Website: atibn.jimdo.com

Agriculture Training Institute, Noakhali (Bengali: কৃষি প্রশিক্ষন ইনষ্টিটিউট,নোয়াখালী) is a combined government technical college in Noakhali, a city in Bangladesh. It was established in 1947. It is situated in Chowrasta, Begumganj Upazila, Noakhali. This is an Agricultural Diploma institute.

== History ==
The school, in the center of Begumganj Upazila, was established in 1947. Initially the school conducted only one shift.

== Facilities ==
The school has three academic buildings, an administrative building. There is a large field and a pond in the school arena. Other facilities include workshop, auditorium, canteen, and library. There are fifteen teachers and twenty staff. The school has two laboratories. The institute contains two student hostels, one mosque, staff quarters and one rest house.

== Extracurricular activities ==
- BNCC (Bangladesh National Cadet Core)
- Scouting
- Games and sports (mostly athletics, cricket, Badminton and football)
- Debating
- Math and language competitions.
- Picnic
- Social Development

== See also ==
- Education in Bangladesh
- List of educational institutions in Noakhali
- List of schools in Bangladesh
