= Rubi Rahman =

Bangladeshi poet and politician

- রুবি রহমান

Member of the Bangladesh Parliament for Reserved Women's Seat-27
- In office 19 March 2009 – 24 January 2014
- Preceded by: Selima Rahman
- Succeeded by: Navana Akter

Personal details
- Born: 3 December 1946 (age 79) Noakhali District, Bengal Province, British India
- Party: Bangladesh Awami League
- Spouse: Nurul Islam
- Children: 2
- Education: University of Dhaka
- Occupation: Poet, politician
- Awards: Bangla Academy Literary Award (2010)

Rubi Rahman (born 3 December 1946) is a poet and a former Jatiya Sangsad member of the government of Bangladesh during 2009–2014. Her notable poetry includes Bhalobasar Kabita (1983), Je Jiban Fariger (1991), Kanpete Achi and Moumachi (2006). She was awarded the 2010 Bangla Academy Literary Award and 2022 Jatiya Kabita Parishad Award.

== Early life ==
Rubi Rahman was born on 3 December 1946 in the village of Noakhola, Chatkhil, Noakhali District in the then Bengal Province, British India.

== Personal life ==
Rubi Rahman was married to Nurul Islam. Together, they had a son, Tamohar Islam Puchi, and a daughter, Moutushi Islam. Nurul was the president of the Ganotantri Party and the Bangladesh Trade Union Kendra. Nurul and Tamohar died in a fire incident on 3 December 2008 at their Lalmatia residence in Dhaka. Rahman and Moutushi alleged foul play in their deaths.
