= Dhannapur =

South Dhannapur দক্ষিণ ধন্যপুর
- Village
- South Dhannapur
- Location in Bangladesh
- Coordinates: 23°3′N 90°57.5′E
- Country: Bangladesh
- Division: Chittagong Division
- District: Noakhali District
- Union Parishad: Mohammadpur Union
- Ward: 4

Area
  - Total: 1.5 km^{2} (0.58 sq mi)

Population (2022)
  - Total: 1,500
- Time zone: UTC+6 (BST)
- Postal code: 3871

South Dhannapur (Bengali: দক্ষিণ ধন্যপুর, romanized: South Dhannapur) is a village in Mohammadpur Union, Chatkhil Upazila, Noakhali District, Chittagong Division, Bangladesh. It is located at 23.0500°N 90.9583°E. According to the 2011 Bangladesh census, Dhannapur had 228 households and a population of 1,207.

== History ==
During the Bangladesh Liberation War of 1971, some of the people of this village were freedom fighters such as Muhammad Abul Khayr ibn Zaynul Abidin and Muhammad Abul Hashim ibn Ali Miah. Abdul Matin ibn Sikandar Miah is a notable Bangladesh Nationalist Party politician from South Dhannapur.

== Facilities ==
It is in close proximity to the Palla Bazar marketplace. There is an eidgah in the south side of the village. The Sunrise Community Welfare Council (Bengali: সূর্যোদয় সমাজ কল্যাণ পরিষদ, romanized: Shurzodoy Shomaz Koillan Horishod) is a local charity operating in Southern Dhannapur.
