= Noakhali Government Women's College =

- নোয়াখালি সরকারি মহিলা কলেজ
- Motto: Knowledge is power
- Type: Government college
- Established: 1970
- Affiliations: Bangladesh National University, Board of Intermediate and Secondary Education, Comilla
- Location: Noakhali, Bangladesh; 22.8629°N 91.1041°E
- Campus: Maijdee

Noakhali Government Women's College is a public college in Noakhali, Bangladesh established in 1970. In 2015, the Higher Secondary Certificate (HSC) pass rate of students at the college was 68.1%.
