= Palla Mahbub Adarsha High School =

Palla Mahbub Adarsha High School Founder Abdul Bari
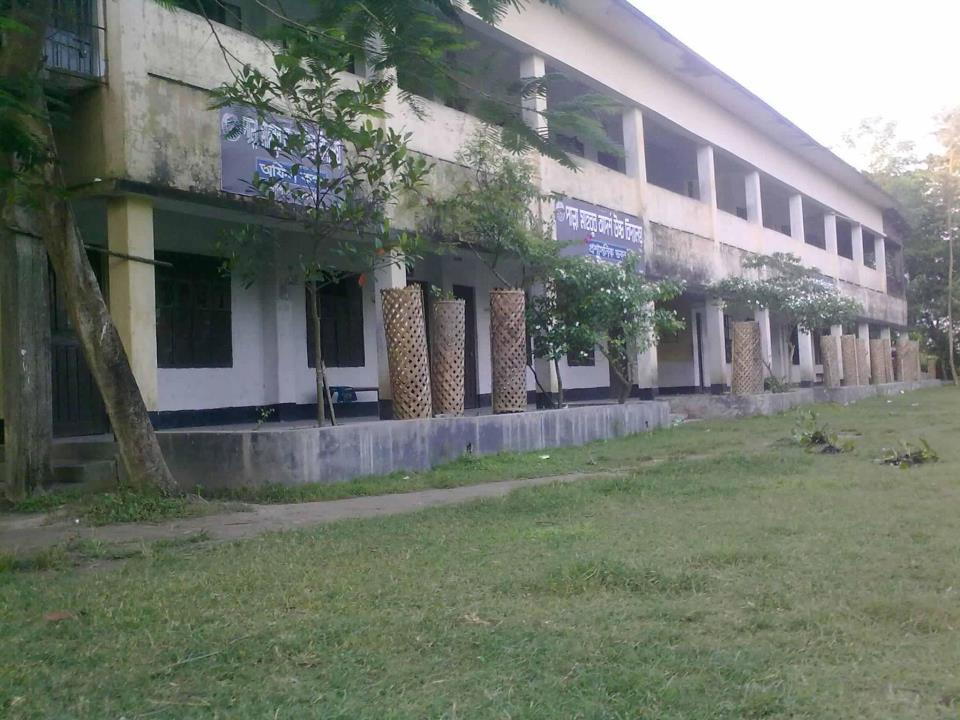

Location
- Chittagong; Bangladesh
- Coordinates: 23.0785°N 90.9850°E

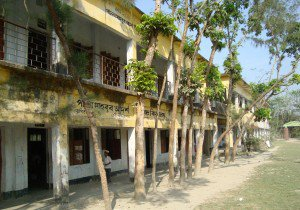
Palla Mahbub Adarsha High School old

Palla Mahbub Adarsha High School is a secondary school situated at Palla Bazar, Chatkhil Upazila, Noakhali, Chittagong, Bangladesh. The EIIN of the school is 107261.
