= Noakhali Medical College =

Medical college in Noakhali, Bangladesh

- নোয়াখালী মেডিকেল কলেজ
- Former names: Abdul Malek Ukil Medical College
- Motto: Learn to serve
- Type: Public medical school
- Established: 2008
- Academic affiliations: Chittagong Medical University
- Principal: Abdus Salam
- Location: Noakhali, Bangladesh; 22.951°N 91.104°E
- Campus: Urban
- Language: English

Noakhali Medical College (Bengali: নোয়াখালী মেডিকেল কলেজ), formerly Abdul Malek Ukil Medical College, is a public medical school in Noakhali, Bangladesh. The college was established in 2008, and renamed in October 2024 as part of a nationwide effort to remove individual names from medical schools and to reference their communities instead.

It provides five-year MBBS degree and it offers all the opportunities of advanced medical science. One-year internship after graduation is compulsory for all graduates. The degree is recognized by the Bangladesh Medical and Dental Council.

== History ==
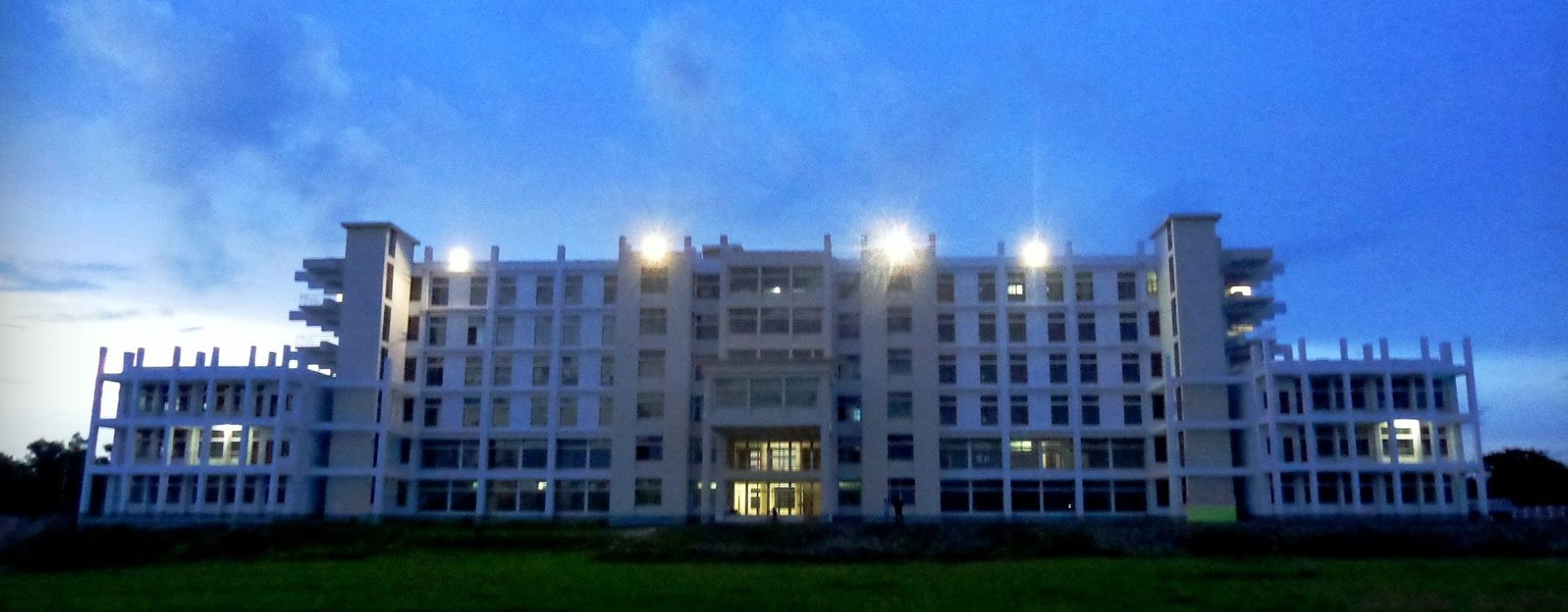
Noakhali Medical College

In the year 1978-79 Bangladesh government planned to establish medical colleges at Bogra, Comilla, Dinajpur, Faridpur, Kushtia, Khulna, Noakhali and Pabna with a view to improve the healthcare services in the country. Subsequently, the programme was abandoned. Than the government felt the need for more medical colleges for medical education facilities. Accordingly, the government committed to establish two new medical colleges at Noakhali and Cox's Bazar with annual intakes of 50 students at each. The college was established in 2008. In 2008 it started educational service in a part of general hospital. After some day it has been shifted to Chowmuhani new campus and continue educational service.

Now it is a modern and technology based medical college and it is running with 250 beds hospital. Its students have made excellent results in Chittagong board every year.

== Organization and administration ==
Noakhali Medical College is affiliated under Chittagong University. The students receive MBBS degree from Chittagong University after completion of their fifth year and passing the final Professional MBBS examination. The Professional examinations are held under the university and results are given thereby. Internal examinations are also taken on regular interval namely Card completions, term end and regular assessments.

== Admissions ==
Noakhali Medical College admits 100 students into the MBBS degree programme yearly under the government medical admission test. NMC is under DGHS and curriculum by BMDC (Bangladesh Medical and Dental Council). Like other government medical colleges, to be admitted into Noakhali Medical College need to be follow DGHS rules.

The admission test is conducted centrally by Director of Medical Education under DGHS (nearly 70,000 applicants sat for the medical college entrance examination in Bangladesh). The test comprises a written MCQ exam, which is held simultaneously in all government medical colleges on the same day throughout the country. Candidates are selected for admission based on national merit and district, whether they are sons or daughters of freedom fighters, and to fill tribal quotas. For foreign students, admission is through the embassy of Bangladesh in their respective countries.

== Clubs and other activities ==
The students of this college are also involved in many extracurricular and social welfare activities.

== Criticism ==
According to a 2015 Dhaka Tribune report, the hospital has 250 beds but it admits about 600 new patients everyday. Many of the patients, unable to get beds, sleep on the floors of corridors and rooms. Its does not have an adequate water supply or catering services and the cleaning crew is understaffed.

== See also ==
- List of medical colleges in Bangladesh
