= Noakhali Government Girls' High School =

- নোয়াখালি সরকারি বালিকা উচ্চ বিদ্যালয়

Location
- Maijdee, Noakhali District; 3800; Bangladesh; 22.8658°N 91.1021°E

Information
- Type: High school
- Established: 1934; 92 years ago
- School board: Board of Intermediate and Secondary Education, Comilla
- Faculty: 46
- Gender: Girls
- Enrolment: 1450
- Colour: Green

Noakhali Government Girls' High School is a girls' school in Noakhali Sadar Upazila, Noakhali District, Bangladesh, established in 1934, founded by late Uma Devi, in Maijdee town for girls' education. Noakhali Government Girl's High School is situated in the center of Maijdee.

Noakhali Government Girls High School was formed on 21 January 1963 by merging Government Girls' M. E School (established 1926) and Uma Girls' High School (1935).
