= Navana Akter =

Bangladeshi politician

Member of Bangladesh Parliament
- In office 10 April 2014 – 30 December 2018
- Preceded by: Rubi Rahman

Personal details
- Party: Bangladesh Awami League

Navana Akter (Bengali: এডভোকেট নাভানা আক্তার) is a Bangladesh Awami League politician and a former member of the Bangladesh Parliament from a reserved seat.

== Early life ==
Akter was born on 9 February 1975. She was a practicing lawyer before joining politics.

== Career ==
Akter was elected to parliament from a reserved seat as a Bangladesh Awami League candidate in 2014.
