= Sonaimuri Model High School =

- সোনাইমুড়ী মডেল উচ্চ বিদ্যালয়

Location
- Sonaimuri; Bangladesh
- Coordinates: 23.0416°N 91.0952°E

Information
- Campus: Sonaimuri

Sonaimuri Model High School is a secondary school located in Sonaimuri town, the administrative headquarters of Sonaimuri Upazila, Noakhali District, Bangladesh. The EIIN of the school is 107373
