= Noakhali Medical Assistant Training School =

Coordinates: 22.867460°N 91.102022°E

Medical Assistant Training School, Noakhali
- চিকিৎসা সহকারী প্রশিক্ষণ বিদ্যালয়, নোয়াখালি
- Maijdee; Bangladesh

Information
- Established: 1975
- Enrollment: 102/session
- Campus: Maijdee town

Noakhali Medical Assistant Training School provides 4 years Medical Assistant Training course followed by 6 months training under Bangladesh State Medical Faculty. Medical Assistant Training School, Noakhali is an organization under Directorate General of Medical Education (DGME).This diploma course makes an individual assistant of doctor.Noakhali MATS is one of 16 MATS along with Bagerhat, Kushtia, Sirajganj, Tangail, Comilla, Faridpur, Jhenaidah, Satkhira, Naogaon, Gazipur, Rajbari, Madaripur, Manikganj, Gopalganj, Sirajganj Kajipur.
