= Chatkhil Upazila =

Chatkhil চাটখিল
- Upazila
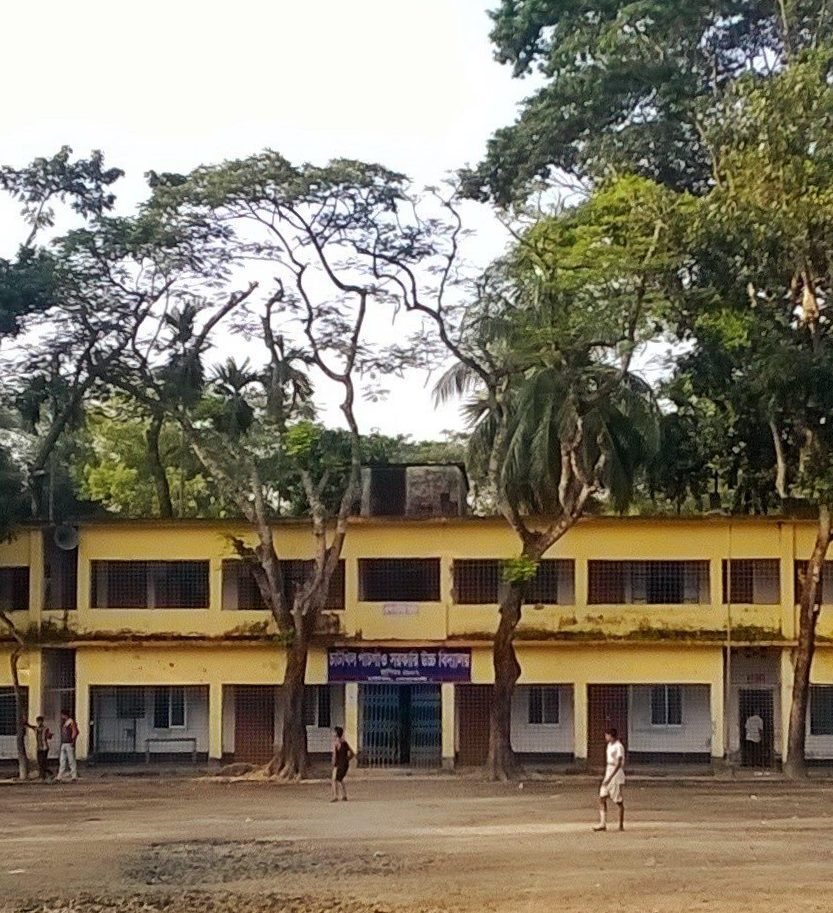
- Chatkhil Panch Gaon Government High School, Chatkhil

- Coordinates: 23°3′N 90°57.5′E
- Country: Bangladesh
- Division: Chittagong
- District: Noakhali

Area
  - Total: 133.89 km^{2} (51.70 sq mi)

Population (2022)
  - Total: 258,794
  - Density: 1,932.9/km^{2} (5,006.1/sq mi)
- Time zone: UTC+6 (BST)
- Postal code: 3870
- Area code: 0321
- Website: chatkhil.noakhali.gov.bd

Chatkhil Upazila mauza geocode map

Chatkhil (Bengali: চাটখিল) is an upazila of Noakhali District in Chittagong Division, Bangladesh. Chatkhil thana was formed in 1977 and was upgraded into an upazila in 1983.

== Geography ==
Chatkhil is located at 23.0500°N 90.9583°E. It has 46,044 household units and a total area 133.89 km^{2}. It is bounded by Manoharganj and Shahrasti Upazila on the north, Lakshmipur Sadar Upazila on the south, Begumganj Upazila on the east, and Ramganj Upazila on the west.

== Demographics ==
Religions in Chatkhil Upazila (2022)
Religion	Percent
Islam	96.93%
Hinduism	3.05%
Other or not stated	0.02%

According to the 2022 Bangladeshi census, Chatkhil Upazila had 59,019 households and a population of 258,794. 10.71% of the population were under 5 years of age. Chatkhil had a literacy rate (age 7 and over) of 85.27%: 85.63% for males and 84.98% for females, and a sex ratio of 84.16 males for every 100 females. 47,618 (18.40%) lived in urban areas.

According to the 2011 Census of Bangladesh, Chatkhil Upazila had 46,044 households and a population of 233,253. 54,246 (23.26%) were under 10 years of age. Chatkhil had a literacy rate (age 7 and over) of 65.57%, compared to the national average of 51.8%, and a sex ratio of 1159 females per 1000 males. 44,775 (15.67%) lived in urban areas.

The town is now a municipality with an area of 6.07 km^{2} and population 28,817; male 48.45%, female 51.55%. It has 9 wards and 18 mahallas. Literacy rate among the town people is 54.8%.

== Administration ==
Chatkhil police station was established in 1977 and was turned into an Upazila in 1983.

Chatkhil Upazila is divided into Chatkhil Municipality and nine union parishads: Badalkot, Hat Pukuriaghatlabag, Khilpara, Mohammadpur, Noakhala, Panchgaon, Porokote, Ramnarayanpur and Sahapur. The union parishads are subdivided into 108 mauzas and 129 villages.

Chatkhil Municipality is subdivided into 9 wards and 16 mahallas.

The hub of the Upazila is Bhimmpur village which consists of Chatkhil Bazar and the administration office of Chatkhil Upazila.

== Notable residents ==
- Shirin Sharmin Chaudhury- politician
- Munier Choudhury, writer
- Kabir Chowdhury, writer
- Muhammed Abul Manzur, general
- Ferdousi Mazumder, actress
- Habibur Rahman (bn), professor
- Rubi Rahman, poet and politician

== See also ==
- Dhannapur, a village in Chatkhil
