= Chatkhil Panch Gaon Government High School =

Higher secondary school in Noakhali District, Bangladesh

- চাটখিল পাঁচগাঁও সরকারী উচ্চ বিদ্যালয়
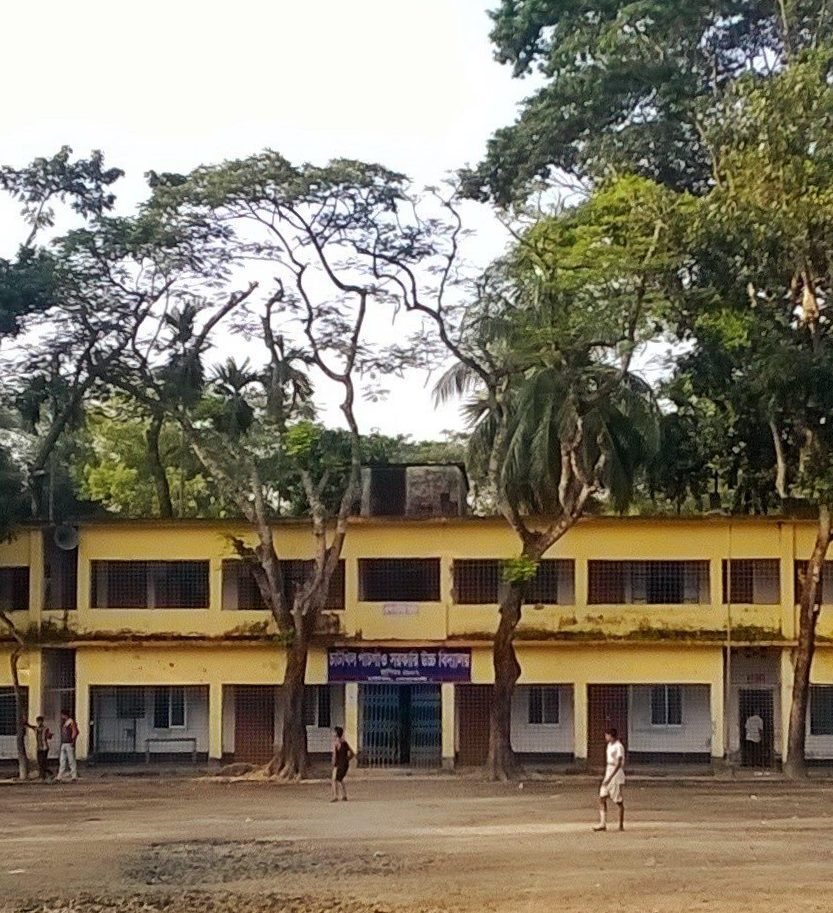
- PG high School

Location
- Chatkhil, Noakhali District; Bangladesh
- Coordinates: 23.0601°N 90.9843°E

Information
- Type: Secondary school
- Motto: Diligite Lumen Sapientiae
- Established: 1907
- School board: Comilla Education Board
- Enrollment: 570

Chatkhil Panch Gaon Government High School is a government higher secondary school in Chatkhil town of Chatkhil, Noakhali District, Bangladesh. The school was established in 1907.

== Facilities ==
The school has four buildings. A big field is by the school. 25 teachers work there. Other facilities include an auditorium, a pond, canteen, shaheed minar, library, upazilla science club, and computer lab. The school offers science laboratories. The school organizes morning assembly, annual sports and games, and an annual prize ceremony.

== Sections ==
The school has classes from the 6th to 10th grades. Two sections are available for each grade.

== Uniform ==
The boys' uniform is a white shirt with white full pants and white shoes and a black belt. The school monogram appears on the shoulder.

The girls' uniform is a navy blue frock, white payjama and white orna.

== Admission ==
Students are typically admitted in class 6. Admission can be considered in other classes given a vacancy or if someone is transferred from another government school. The admission test is generally taken in the first week of January.

== Curriculum ==
This school follows the national education curriculum. The curriculum includes secondary academic subjects. Classes in computing are compulsory for grades 6–10. Students of secondary (9 and 10) classes elect one of two major groups: Business Studies and Science.

== Extracurricular activities ==
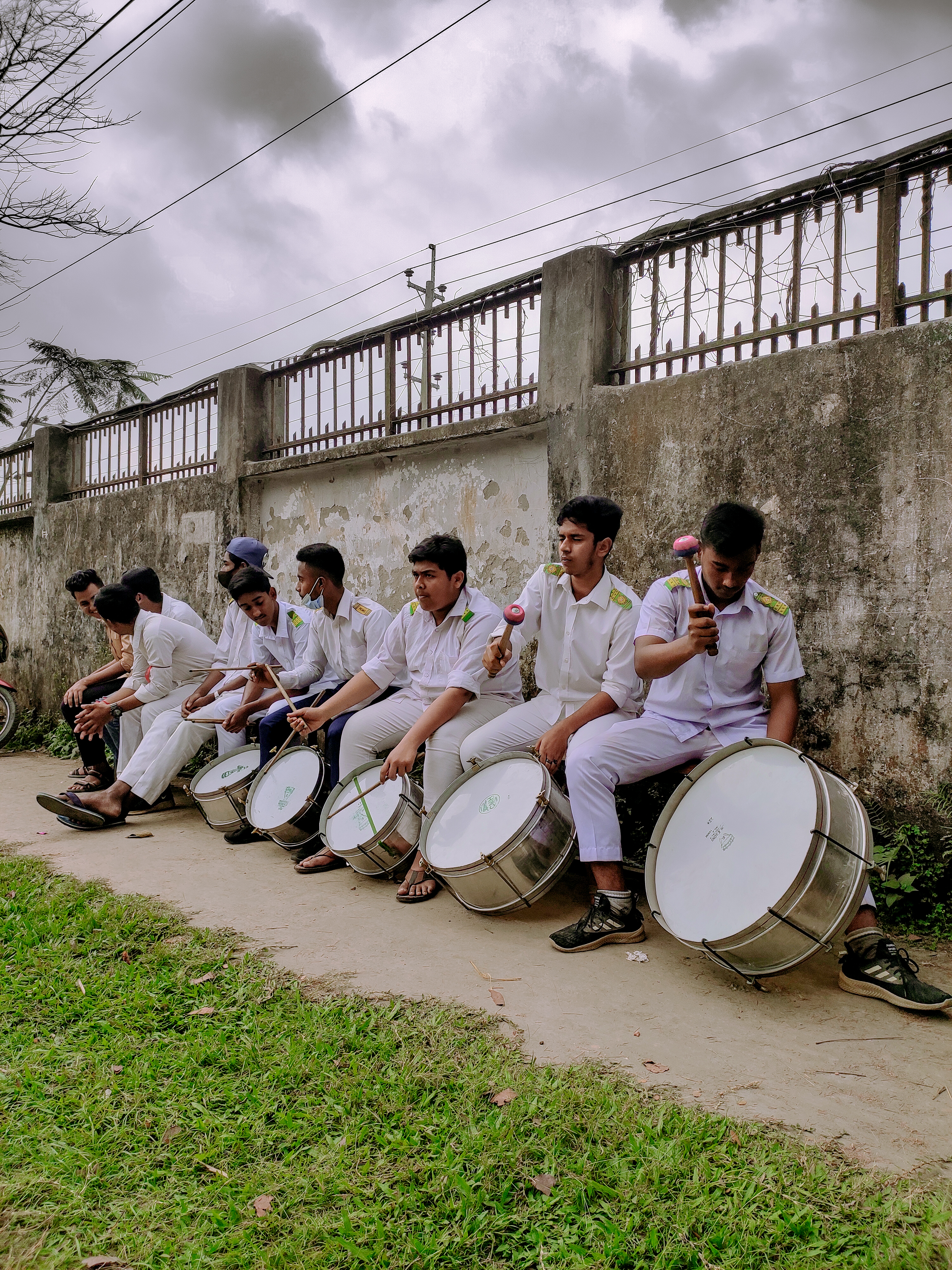
Drum team of Chatkhil PG School

- Scouting
- Red Crescent functions
- Games and sports (Cricket, Football, Badminton)
- Debating
- Science fair
- Cultural and Religious Programmes
- Study tour
