= Noakhali District =

District in Chattogram Division

Noakhali District নোয়াখালী জেলা
- District of Bangladesh
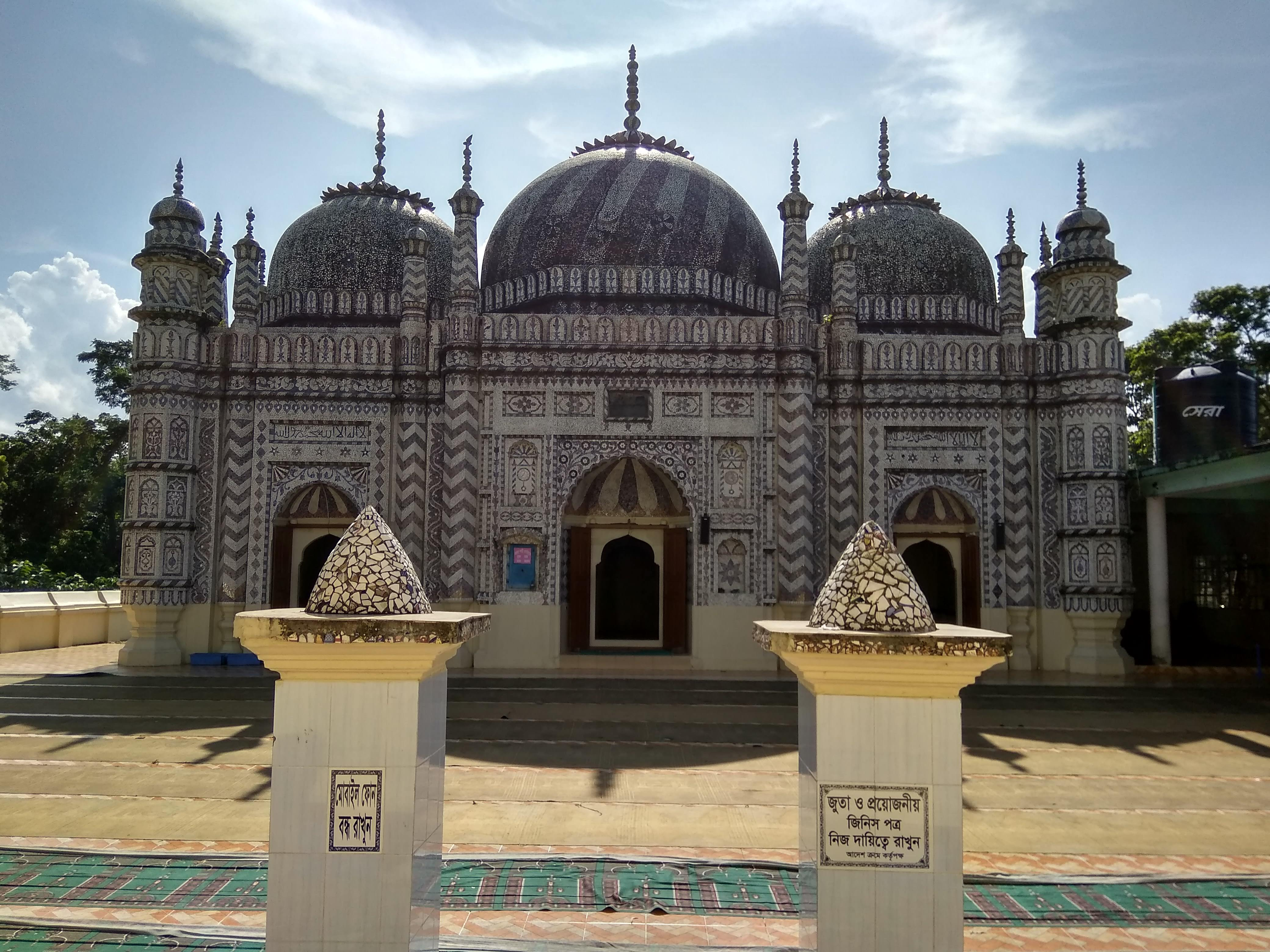
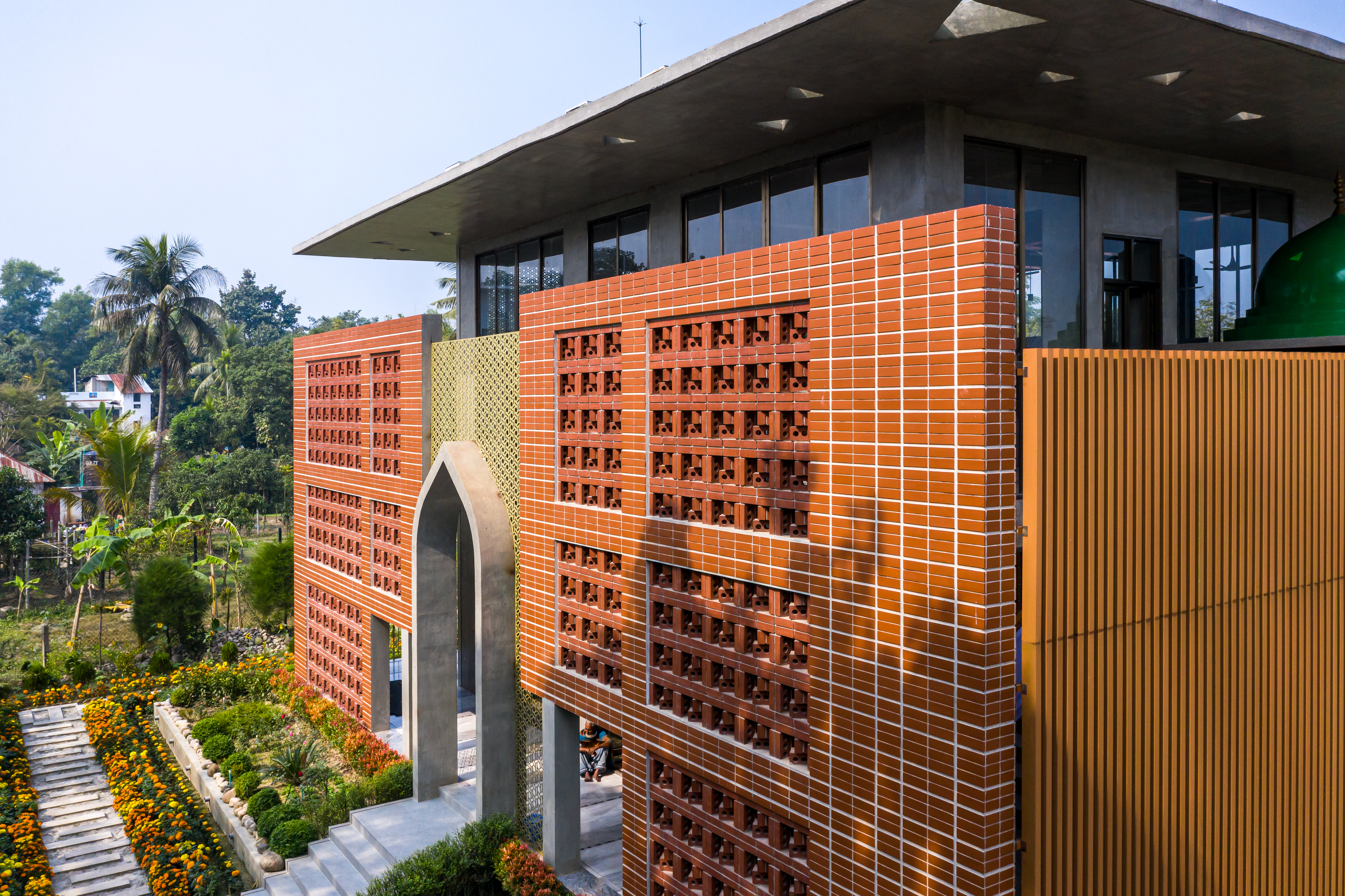
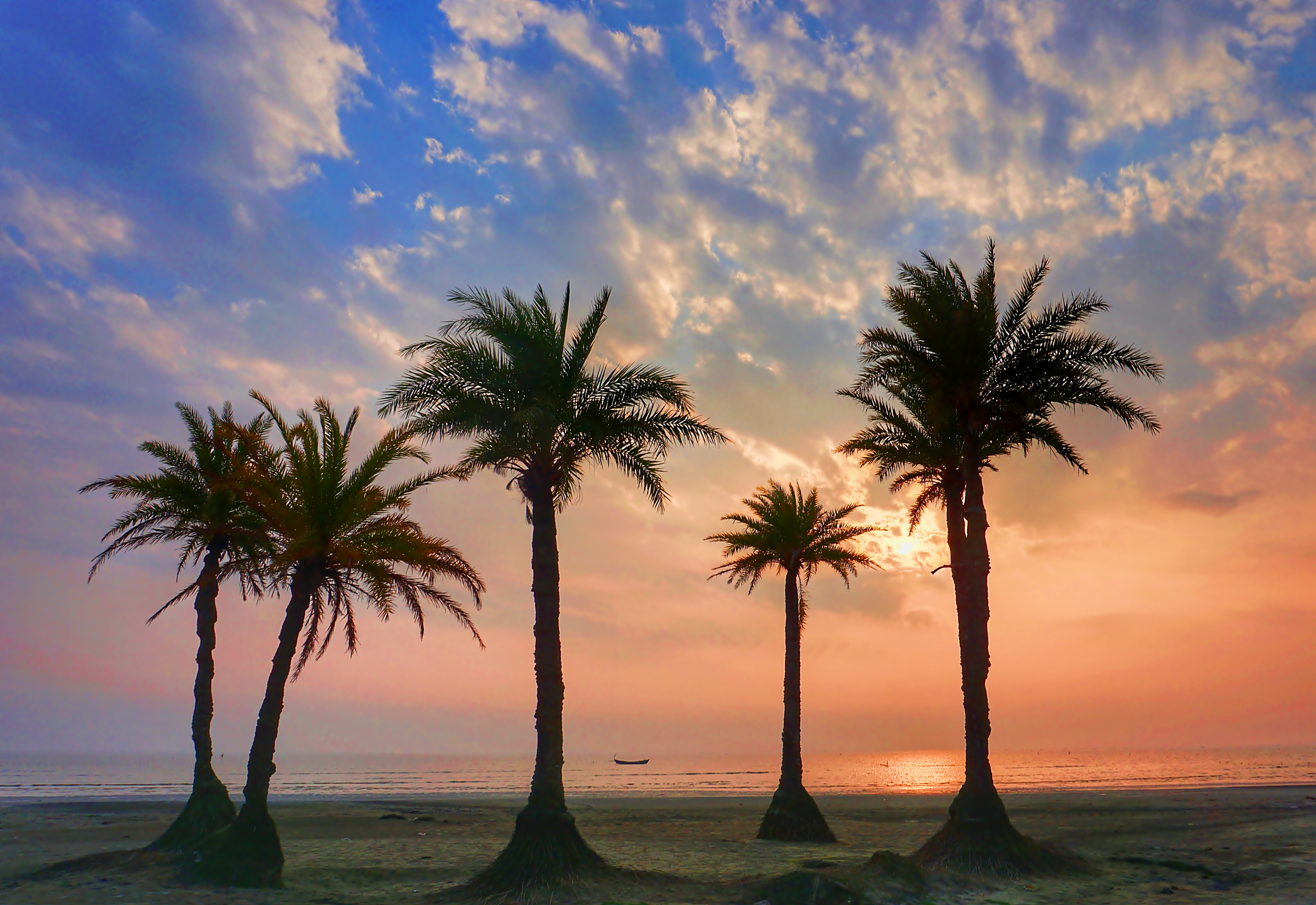
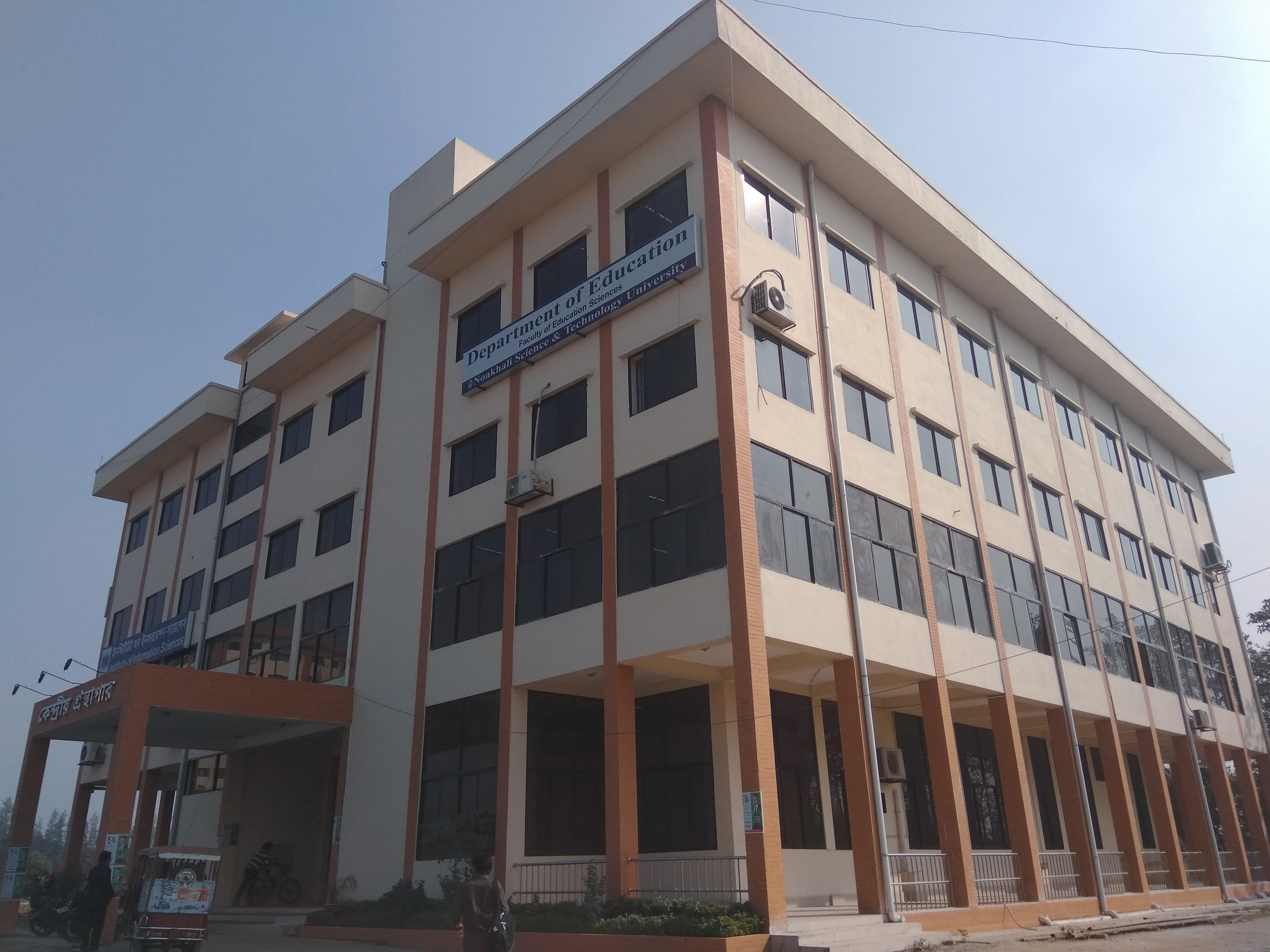
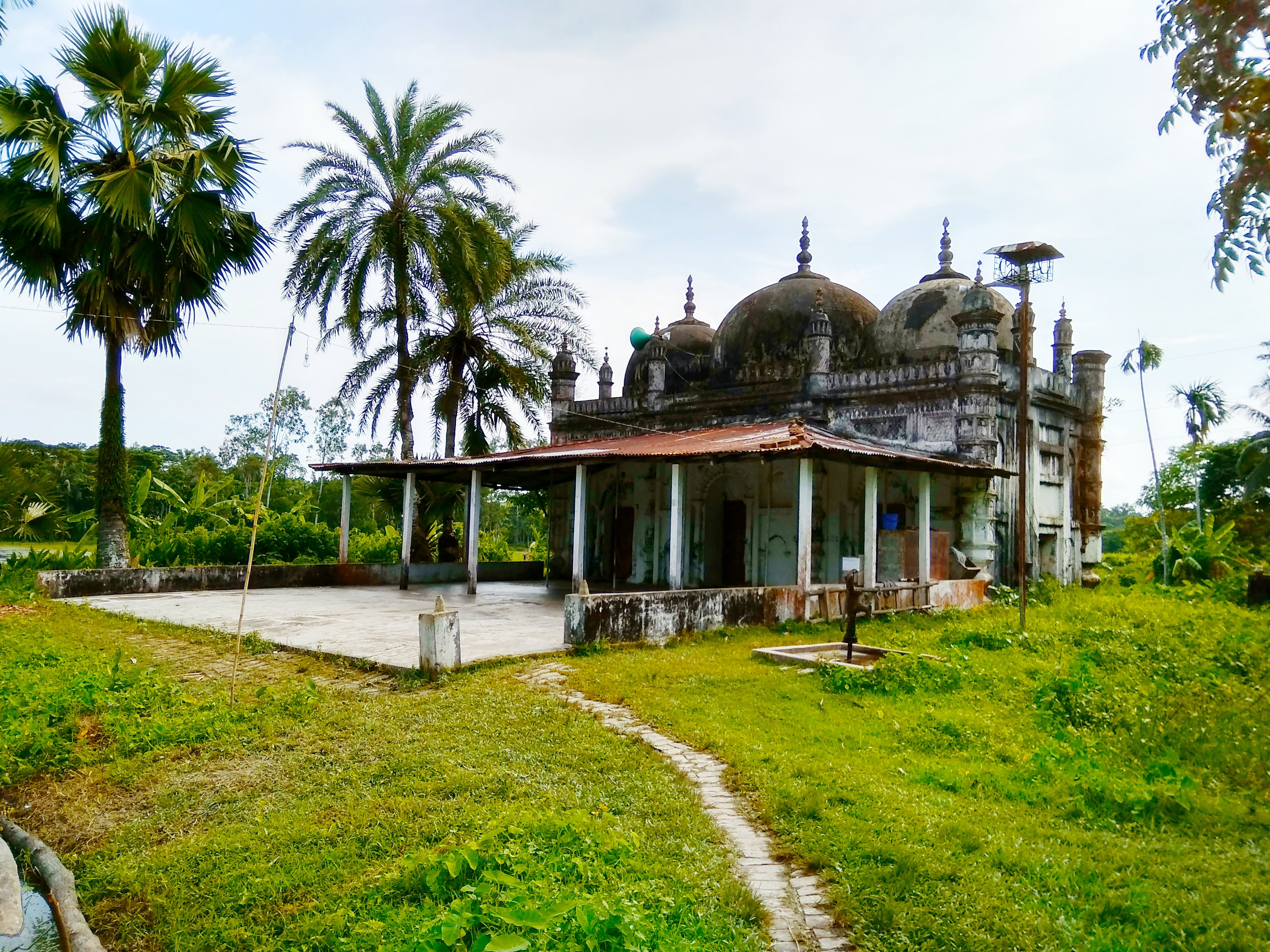
- Clockwise from top-left: Bajra Shahi Mosque, Nolua Miah Bari Jame Masjid, Nijhum Dwip, Central Library of NSTU, Ramjan Miah Masjid, Noakhali Waterfall

- Location of Noakhali District in Bangladesh
- Expandable map of Noakhali District
- Coordinates: 22.70°N 91.10°E
- Country: Bangladesh
- Division: Chittagong Division
- Established: 1821
- Headquarters: Maijdee

Government
  - Deputy Commissioner: Ahmed Kamrul Hasan

Area
  - Total: 4,202 km^{2} (1,622 sq mi)

Population (2022)
  - Total: 3,625,442
  - Density: 862.8/km^{2} (2,235/sq mi)
- Demonym: Noakhailla
- Time zone: UTC+06:00 (BST)
- Postal code: 3800
- Area code: 0321
- ISO 3166 code: BD-47
- HDI (2022): 0.661 medium · 18th of 22
- Notable sport teams: NoFeL SC Noakhali Express
- Website: www.noakhali.gov.bd

Noakhali District (Bengali: নোয়াখালী জেলা), historically known as Bhulua (Bengali: ভুলুয়া), is a district in southeastern Bangladesh, located in Chattogram Division. It was established as a district in 1821, and officially named Noakhali in 1868. The district's administrative center is situated in the town of Maijdee, governed by Noakhali municipality, within Noakhali Sadar Upazila. Notably, Noakhali is the only district in Bangladesh whose capital city does not share the district's name.

== Etymology and names ==
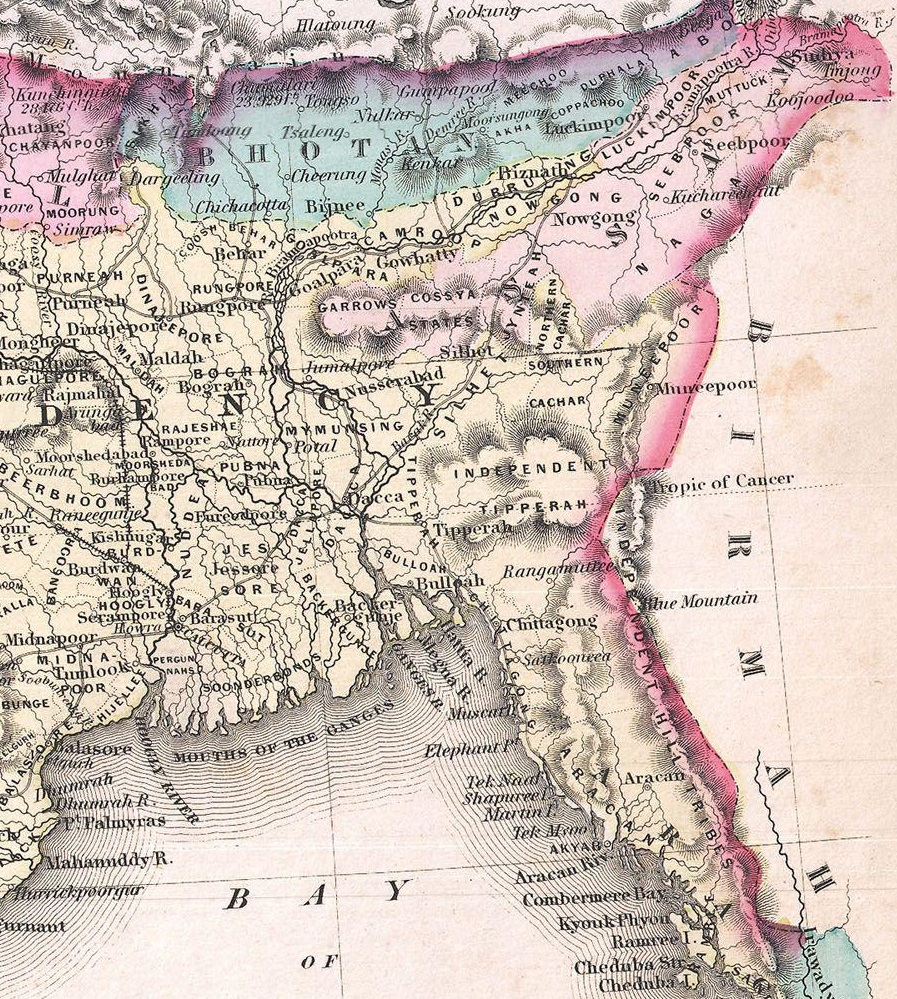
An 1855 map of Bengal by J. H. Colton showing the boundaries of "Bulloah".

The name of Noakhali District comes from the town of Noakhali (নোয়াখালী), which was the former headquarters of the old district. It is a compound of two words; Noa (meaning new in Bengali) and Khali (a diminutive of Bengali word khal meaning canal). The history behind its naming is traced back to a canal that was dug in the 1660s in response to devastating floods which had affected the area's agricultural activities. The canal ran from the Dakatia through Ramganj, Sonaimuri and Chowmuhani, to divert water flow to the junction of the Meghna River and Feni River. After its excavation, locals began calling it "Noakhali" (a new small canal) and a town with this name emerged around it in Sudharam.

Prior to changing its name to Noakhali District in 1868, the district was formerly referred to as the District of Bhulua (ভুলুয়া). Former spellings by the British East India Company include "Bhullooah" and "Bulloah" though these were less consistent with the Bengali pronunciation and spelling. When the district was ruled by the Mughal Empire, it was known by its Urdu variant which was Bhalwa (بهلوا). According to local Hindu mythology, the etymology of Bhulua is related to an incident experienced by Adi Sura's ninth son, Bishwambhar Sur, who had passed through the region during his travels. Sur rested in the area and had a dream in which he saw that Varahi would make him the sovereign of this territory with the condition that Sur worships her. On a cloudy day in 1203 CE, Sur built an altar for Varahi and sacrificed a goat. When the clouds moved away, Sur realized that he had sacrificed the goat to the west, which was not acceptable in Hinduism. As a result, he screamed bhul hua (it was wrong), from which the name Bhulua was said to have come from.

== History ==
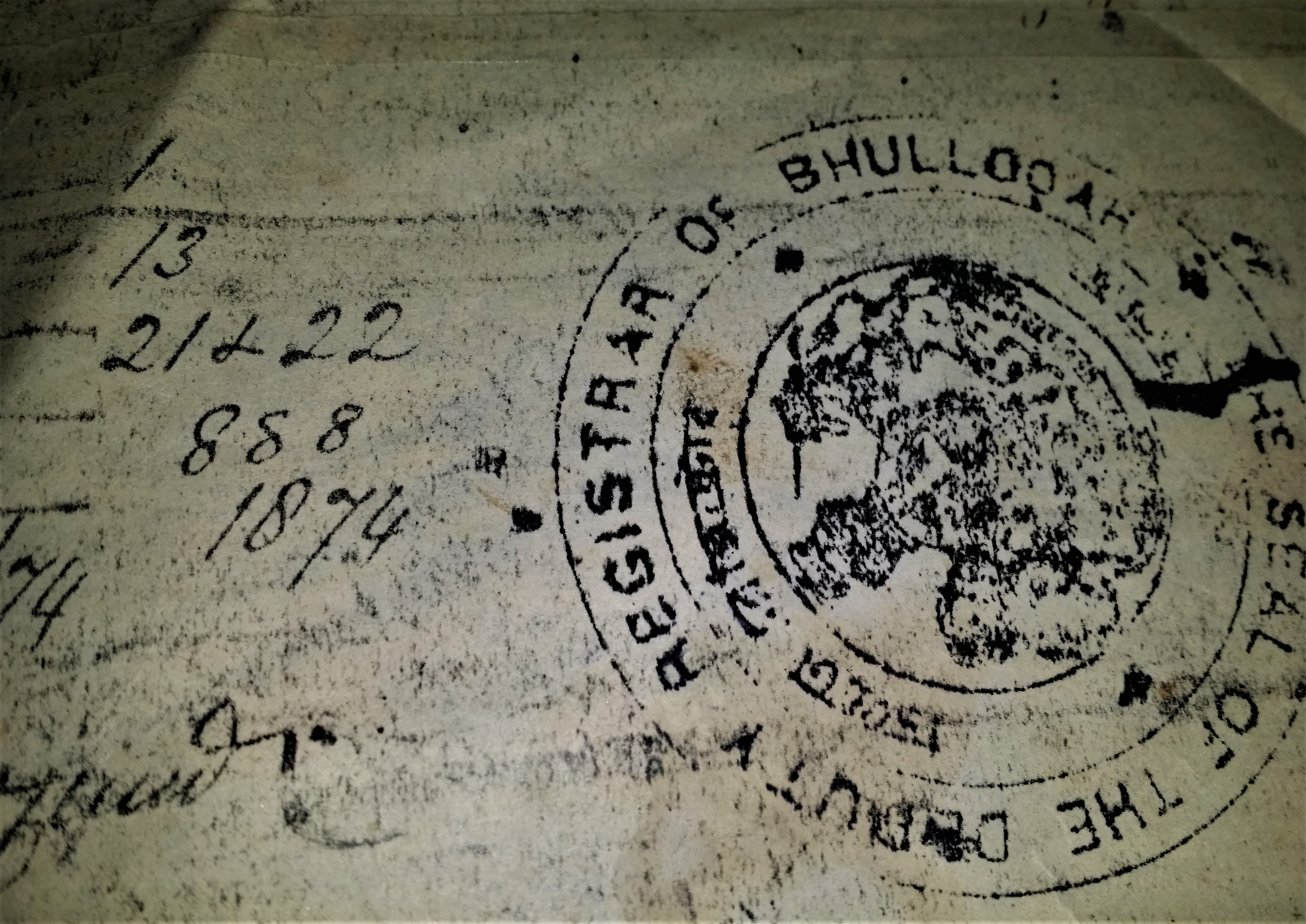
A seal of Bhullooah (Noakhali) Registrar Office sealed on 20 March 1874.

Noakhali is situated on relatively young alluvial deposits, therefore its human history dates from a more recent time than other parts of Bengal. It was in ancient days under the rule of Samatata, Pundra and Harikela Kingdom of ancient Bengal. In the early mediaeval period, the region was under the reign of Khadga, Chandra, Sena and Deva dynasty. The Bhulua Kingdom was founded in the 13th century, and ruled over the region until the 16th century. After the invasion of Muslims in eastern Bengal, Bhulua became a vassal of the Bengal Sultanate, and was continually on the border between the Tripura and Arakan. During this time, many Muslim pirs arrived in the region and the Bhulua kings employed Muslims in many administrative posts. After the collapse of the Sultanate, Bhulua was aligned with the Baro-Bhuyan rulers. During their suppression of the Baro Bhuiyan insurgency, the Mughals under Sarhad Khan conquered Bhulua, bringing it under Mughal Empire. It became part of the Sarkar of Sonargaon. They successfully defended it against Magh raids, and ruled it until 1762 when the East India Company took control of Bengal.

The Noakhali District was established in 1868 as a renaming of the Bhulua district, which the British founded on 29 March 1822. It headquarters was in the town of Noakhali until the town vanished in the river-bed in 1951, as a result of the Meghna River erosion. A new headquarters for the Noakhali District was then established at Maijdee.

In 1964 under the Government of East Pakistan, the Sadar subdivision was divided into two sub-divisions; Noakhali Sadar and Lakshmipur though the Feni subdivision remained how it was. In 1984, the District of Noakhali was further divided into three districts for administrative convenience; Noakhali District, Lakshmipur and Feni.

== Economy ==
The people of Noakhali play a vital role in Bangladesh's economy, especially in the remittance sector. Agriculture plays a vital role in the regional economy. 30% of the regional GDP comes from agriculture with 45% of the population employed in the sector. Employment in the fishing industry is also dominant in the poorer sectors of the population. Annually, 15%–20% of labor is involved in this sector (boating, fishing, drying, net and boat making and repairing, transporting fish from one location to other). Poorer communities are involved in crop production during the winter but in other periods they are involved in fishing, either working for themselves or selling their labour to the mohajan. Around 40% of the population works abroad playing a vital role in the national economy. The main sources of income dependent on non-agricultural labour 3.43%, industry 0.84%, commerce 14.74%, transport and communication 3.83%, service 16.11%, construction 1.49%, religious service 0.39%, rent and remittance 7.97% and others 10.58%.

=== Agriculture ===
The economy of Noakhali is predominately agricultural. Of the total 544,943 holdings of the district 65.37% of the holdings are farms that produce varieties of crops, namely: local and hybrid rice, wheat, vegetables, spices, cash crops, pulses, betel leaves, boro and Aman paddy, peanut, varieties of pulses, chili, sugarcane, potato, and others. Various fruits like mango, banana, jack fruit, papaya, litchi, palm coconut, and betel nut are grown.

Fish of different varieties are found in the sea and rivers and paddy fields in the rainy season. Fishes like ruhi, katla, mrigel, kala baush, koi, grass carp, silver carp, talapia, nilotica, and different species of local deshi fishes have also been introduced for commercial pisciculture (fish farming) in ponds and water lands.

Timber and forest trees are grown in this district including koroi, sheel koroi, garjan, jarul, shimul, mahogany, and bamboo.

== Administration ==
Noakhali District upazila geocode map

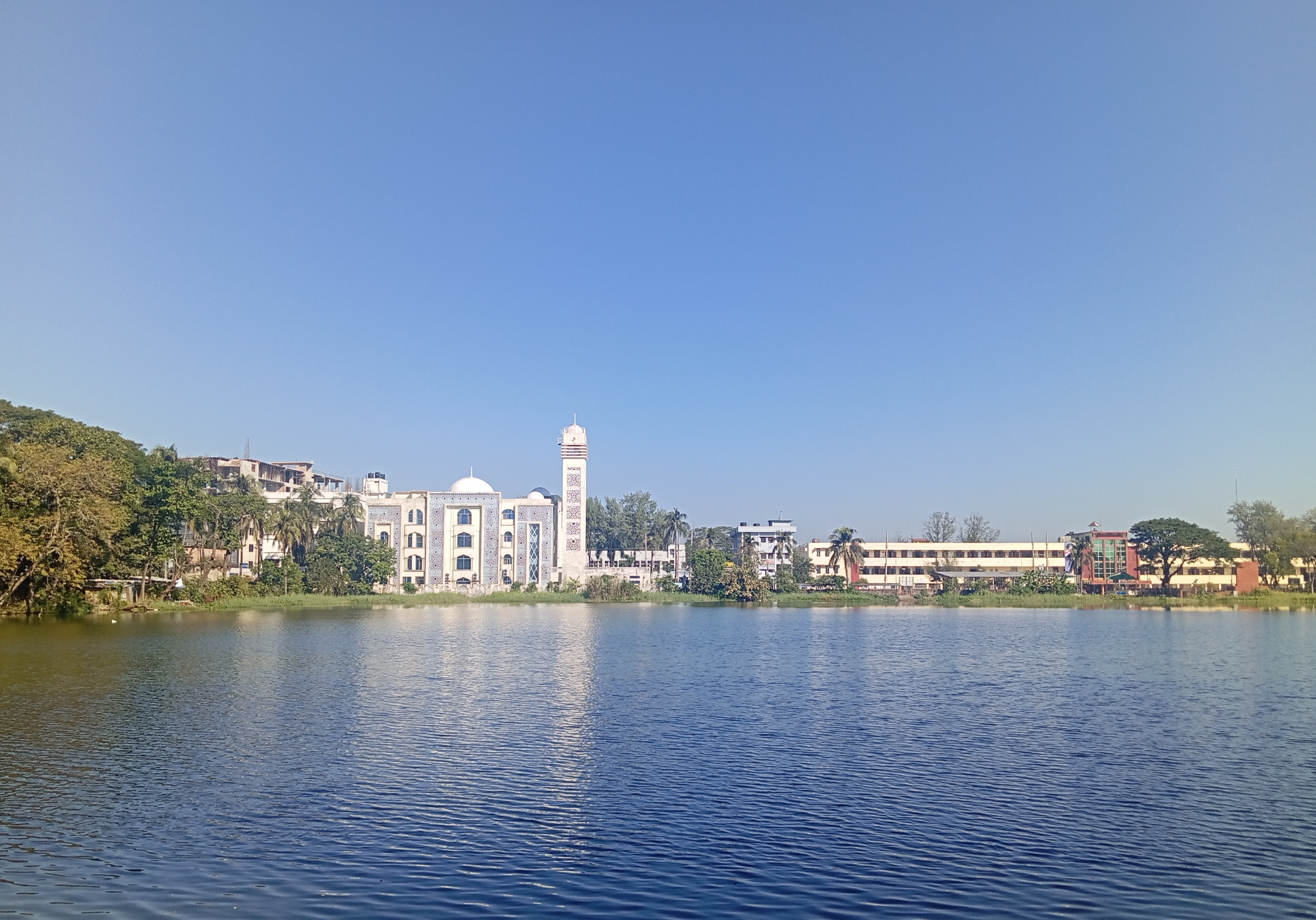
District Commissioner Office on right situated close to Model Mosque, Maijdee

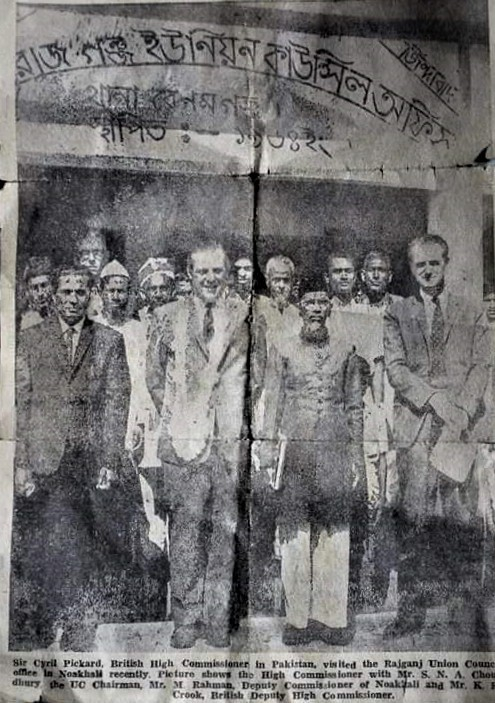
Syed Nur Alam Chowdhury, former chairman of Rajganj Union, pictured with British high commissioner.

Noakhali District consists of nine upazilas, eight municipalities, 72 wards, 153 mahallas, 91 unions, 882 mouzas and 967 villages.

Upazila	Population (2022)	Area (sq. k.m.)	Municipality	Population (2022)
Noakhali Sadar	642,471	336.06	Noakhali	132,185
Begumganj	611,081	238.37	Chowmuhani	100,048
Chatkhil	258,786	133.89	Chatkhil	39,755
Companiganj	301,295	380.95	Basurhat	38,479
Hatiya	537,355	1507.35	Hatiya	57,449
Kabirhat	238,733	185.25	Kabirhat	21,507
Senbagh	310,871	159.36	Senbagh	22,958
Sonaimuri	368,828	169.14	Sonaimuri	44,737
Subarnachar	355,902	575.47	-	-

The district's administrative headquarters are located in Noakhali Municipality encompassing Maijdee, which is the most populous municipality in the district, situated within Noakhali Sadar Upazila, the most populated upazila. Conversely, Kabirhat Upazila and its corresponding municipality have the lowest population. In terms of land area, Hatiya Upazila is the largest, while Chatkhil Upazila is the smallest.

== Geography ==
Noakhali District is bordered by Comilla District to the north, the Meghna estuary and the Bay of Bengal to the south, Feni and Chittagong districts to the east and Lakshmipur and Bhola districts to the west. The district has an area of 4,202 km^{2} (1,622 sq mi). The district represents an extensive flat, coastal and delta land, located on the tidal floodplain of the Meghna River delta, characterised by flat land and low relief. The area is influenced by diurnal tidal cycles; the tidal fluctuations vary depending on seasons, and are most pronounced during the monsoon season. On three sides of Noakhali, an alluvial plain that is inundated annually and fertilised by silt deposits from the Meghna estuary. The swift currents that course down from the Himalayas carry rich fertile silt. When it reaches the Bay of Bengal the silt settles along the coast gradually forming new land called the "chars". The district of Noakhali has actually gained more than 73 km^{2} (28 sq mi) of land in the past fifty years. In addition to the Meghna, the district is home to other rivers such as the Feni River and Banmi as well as the Noakhali, Mahendra, Dakatia, Chandraganj canals.

=== Climate ===
Noakhali has a tropical climate and has significant rainfall in most months of the year, with a short dry season. In Noakhali, the average annual temperature is 25.6 °C (78.1 °F) and the average annual rain fall is about 3,302 mm (130.0 in). With an average temperature of 45.6 °C (114.1 °F), May is the warmest month. At 19.5 °C (67.1 °F) on average, January is the coldest month of the year. The driest month is January with 8 mm (0.31 in) of precipitation. In July, the rainfall reaches its peak, with an average of 671 mm (26.4 in).

=== Flora and fauna ===
Flora Noakhali is one of the coastal districts at the fringe of the Bay of Bengal with vast char land of recent origin in the south. Plantlife is confined generally to variations belonging to the lower Gangetic plane and of other districts in the southern region of the country. Except for the Government-sponsored afforestation program for the coastal belt, there is no organized forestry in the district.

However, all homesteads are usually covered by dense and lush green foliage of a wide variety of trees. Most of the trees grown in homestead forests are fruitbearing. Mangoes, although poor in quality, grow in abundance. Almond or badam (Arachis hypogea) are unusual. Other common trees are jack fruit (Artocarpus heterophyllus), blackberry (Syzygium cumini), tamarind (Tamarindus indica), jalpai (Elaeocarpus tectorius), bel (Aegle marmelos), chalta (Dillenia indica), boroi, guava (Psidiumguagava), etc. Banana (Banana musa sapientum) is seen almost everywhere but the fruit quality is rather poor.

Litchi (Litchi chinensis), kamranga (Averrho karmbola), ata, haritaki (Terminalia chebula), amloki (Phyllanthus emblica), gaab (Dioaspyros precatorius), etc. grow abundantly. The juice of the gaab fruit mixed with charcoal is used in colouring boats and stiffening fishing nets. Coconut (Cocos nucifera) is abundantly produced in Noakhali.

Indigenous timber trees include Koroi, sheel koroi (Albizia procera), garjan (Dipterocarpus turbinatus), jarul (Iegerstroemia speciosa), shimul (Bombax ceiba), etc. However, various exotic trees like teak, mahogany (Swietenia macrophylla), sissu (Dalbergia sissoo), etc. have been produced as wayside trees as well as in farm forestry.

Mandar (Erythrina variegata), a thorny tree mostly used as fuel and fencing, is seen in almost every household forest. Kadom (Anthocephalus cadamba) are very common and are preferred for manufacturing matchsticks. The fruit of shimul or karpas is used for stuffing mattresses and pillows and has a silky appearance. Newly introduced trees include eucalyptus and pine.

Mango wood is not good as a timber, but owing to its abundance, it is much used. The wood of the tamarind and the kul is hard-grained and of good quality. The amaltas is used for house and rough furniture construction. Jarul is used for boat building and pillars of houses.

The luxuriant growth of palms is the most characteristic feature of the vegetation. Betel nut palm or supari (Areca catechu) plantations are more and more abundant towards the north and the west of the district and grow almost lie forests. Coconuts are grown abundantly throughout the district. Toddy palms or tal (Borassus flabellifer) and date palms or khejur are also very common. Date palm is a valuable tree. The juice is extracted and made into gurr, the leaves are made into mat. Tal wood is used for posts of houses and other building purposes. Its leaves are used for making handmade mats and large hand fans. Betel nut and coconut are a good sources of household income.

Shade trees include banyan or bot (Ficus benghalensis), pipal (Ficus religiosa) and nim (Azadirachta indica) and are seen commonly.

There are several varieties of cane, a good deal of bamboo of different varieties, and thatching grass or chhan although their plantations are gradually but steadily decreasing. Use of bamboo is widespread for posts and fencing for houses, basket making and producing trays of various kinds. Bet is used for making baskets, binding and thatching. In the marshes are found sola (Aeschynomene aspera) and murta or mostak (Schumannianthus dichotomus ) which is extensively used for making various types of mats famously known as shital pati and baskets.

The forest department of the government of Bangladesh created mangrove forests in Nijhum Dwip. The most common type of planted tree species on the island is keora, also known as kerfa, which has fast growing roots holding the sandy land. The tree occurs on newly accreted soil in moderately to strongly saline areas and is considered as a pioneer species in ecological succession.

Fauna

Owing to the absence of organized forest and other natural conditions, no large or medium-sized carnivores are seen in the district. However, the following mammals have still seen the district although their number is gradually decreasing: jackal (Canis aureus), fox (Vulpes bengalensis), large Indian civet or bagdas (Viverra zibetha), otter or uud (Lutra lutra), Irrawaddy, kath biral (Callosciuruspy gerythrus), Bengal mongoose or beji (Herpestes edwards), different kinds of rats and several species of bats.

Buffalo is found in char and on Hatia island. The vast offshore areas and the emerging islands of the Noakhali district have become potential places for raising buffalo.

Almost all varieties of birds that are seen throughout Bangladesh are also commonly seen in Noakhali. Raptors include: white-rumped vulture (Gyps bengalensis), lanner falcon or baj (Falco biarmicus), marsh harrier or gochila (Circus aeruginesus), pariah cheel (Milvus migyans lineatas), several species of stork like pond heron or kani boga (Ardeola greyii), cattle egret or go boga (Babulcus ibis) and black bittern or kala boga (Dupeter plovicollis), crows (Corvus splendens) and kingfisher (Alcedo atthis), etc.

Ducks are represented by a number of species including winter migrants like: greenleg goose (Anser anser), rajhans (Anser indicus), the pintail (Anas acuta) and some other domestic species. Water birds include: the little cormorant or pankawri (Phalacrocorax niger), waterhen or dahuk (Amaurornis phonicurus), kora (Gallicrex cinarea).

Cuckoo or kokil (Cuculus micropterus), black-hooded oriole or halde pakhi (Oriolus xanthornus), kingcrow or finge (Dicrurus adsimilis), moyna (Sturnus malabarica), shalik (Acridotheres tristis), redvented bulbuli (Pycnotus cafer), tuntuni (Orthotomus sutorious), shayma (Copsyehus malabaricus), sparrow (Passer domesticus), flowerpecker (Dicacum erythrochynchos), babui (Plocus phillippinus) famous for their artistic nest building, and several species of pheasant quails (Eudynamis scolopscea), pigeons and doves are also present.

Reptiles include snakes, lizards and tortoises. The snakes include varieties of cobra, urgabora, dughadabora, kuchiabora and jinlabora, all poisonous. The lizards include gecko, calotis, wall lizard and monitor lizard. There are amphibians like toads, frogs and tree frogs.

There are many species of sea and fresh water fish available in the district. The list of the varieties is too long to include here. Although Noakhali is coastal district, most of the fish supply comes from ponds and tanks, canals and low-lying areas inundated by rain water, popular varieties include: the carp tribe (Cyprinidoes), ruhi (Labeo rohita), katla (Catla catla), mrigel (Cirrhinus mrigala) and kalabaush (labeo calbasu), airh (Sperata aor), pangas (Pangasius pangasius), tengra (Mystus vittatus) of several types, magur (Clarias batrschus), singi (Saccobranchus fossilis) and koi (Mystus vittatus) are considered to be delicious, shoul (Channa striatus), boal (Wallago attu), gozar (Channa marulius), chitol (Chitala chitala), foli (Notopterus notopterus) and pabda (Ompok pabda) are available in abundance.

Hilsa (Tenualosa ilisha), baila (Awaous guamensis), bhetki (Lates calcarifer), bata (Labeo bata), and loitta fish are also available in abundance.

Prawn, crayfish (icha) and crabs are also found. Tilapia, Muralla, Punti, Khoksha, Kajuli, Kakila, Khailsha, Bain and Chela are small fish like Mola, Kachki are found all over the district in abundance.

Created mangrove forests in Nijhum Dwip are the habitat of about 5,000 cheetral or spotted deer. This island has been declared as an eco-tourist spot for its ideal natural setup with rich bio-diversification factors and its perennial mangrove forest with wild animals like spotted deer, wild boar and rhesus macaque and for the ideal habitat for fish resources.

== Culture ==
=== Language ===
The official language of Noakhali is Bengali. It is used in education and all government affairs in the district. The main Bengali dialect spoken here is called Noakhailla.

Noakhailla dialect is also spoken in Feni, Lakshmipur and parts of southern Comilla. It is very much mutually intelligible with neighbouring dialect Sandwipi. Some Bengali People of Indian state of Tripura also speak Noakhailla dialect, and along with standard Bengali, this Bengali dialect is used as the lingua franca among some Indian tribes in the district of South Tripura. These Indians tribes are Twipra, Chakma, Mog, Marma and Reang.

Other languages spoken by non-Bengali minorities include Tripuri and Urdu by the Tripuri and Bihari people respectively.

=== Literature ===
Bengali literature in Noakhali dates back several centuries, with the puthi tradition being one of the principal genres and Muhammad Qasim of Jogdia being a prominent 18th-century poet. Shaykh Basania of Asadia composed the Chowdhurir Larai, a ballad written in literary Bengali, dealing with a historic battle fought by Zamindar Raj Chandra Chowdhury of Babupur. The work inspired other authors such as Yaqub Ali, Balak Faqir, Muhammad Farid and Muhammad Yunus who wrote their own adaptations. In the 20th century, Mukarrim Billah Chowdhury wrote Noakhalir Itihas, an important work relating to the history of Noakhali. In the medieval period, some local Bengalis were also writing in the Persian and Arabic languages. Notable examples include Muhammad Habibur Rahman, Muhammad Musa, and the Persian-language poets Mawlana Nuri and Wazir Ali.

=== Architecture ===
The intense building of mosques that took place during the Sultanate era indicates the rapidity with which the locals converted to Islam. Today, mosques are present in every Muslim-inhabited village. Bengali mosques are normally covered with several small domes and curved brick roofs decorated with terracotta. Ponds are often located beside a mosque. Major archeological works in the district include the 18th-century mosques of Bajra and Ramadan Mia. The Rajganj Mia Bari in Begumganj is a prominent zamindar palace in the district and was built by honorary magistrate Syed Sultan Alam Chowdhury.

Architecture of Noakhali

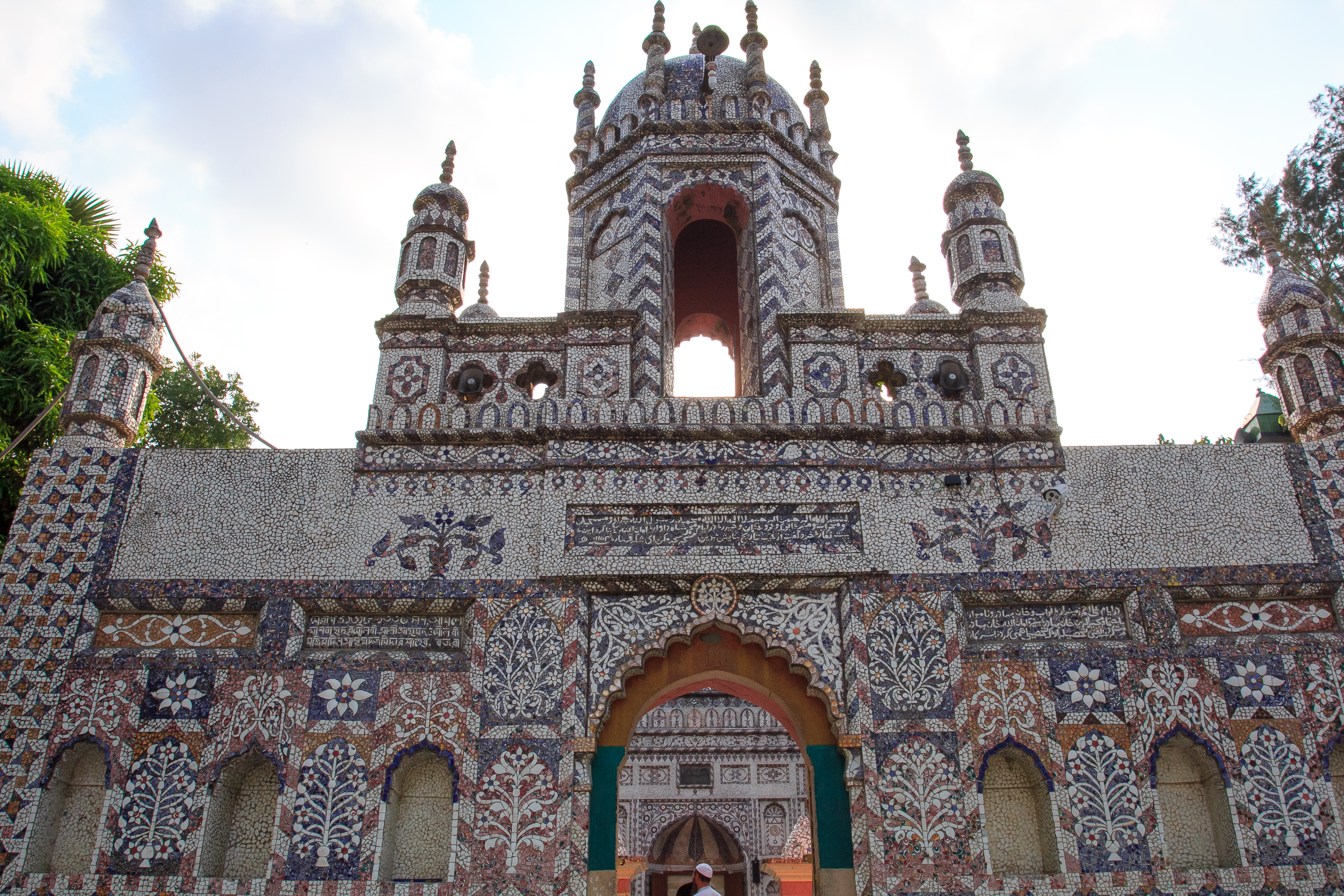
Bajra Shahi Mosque

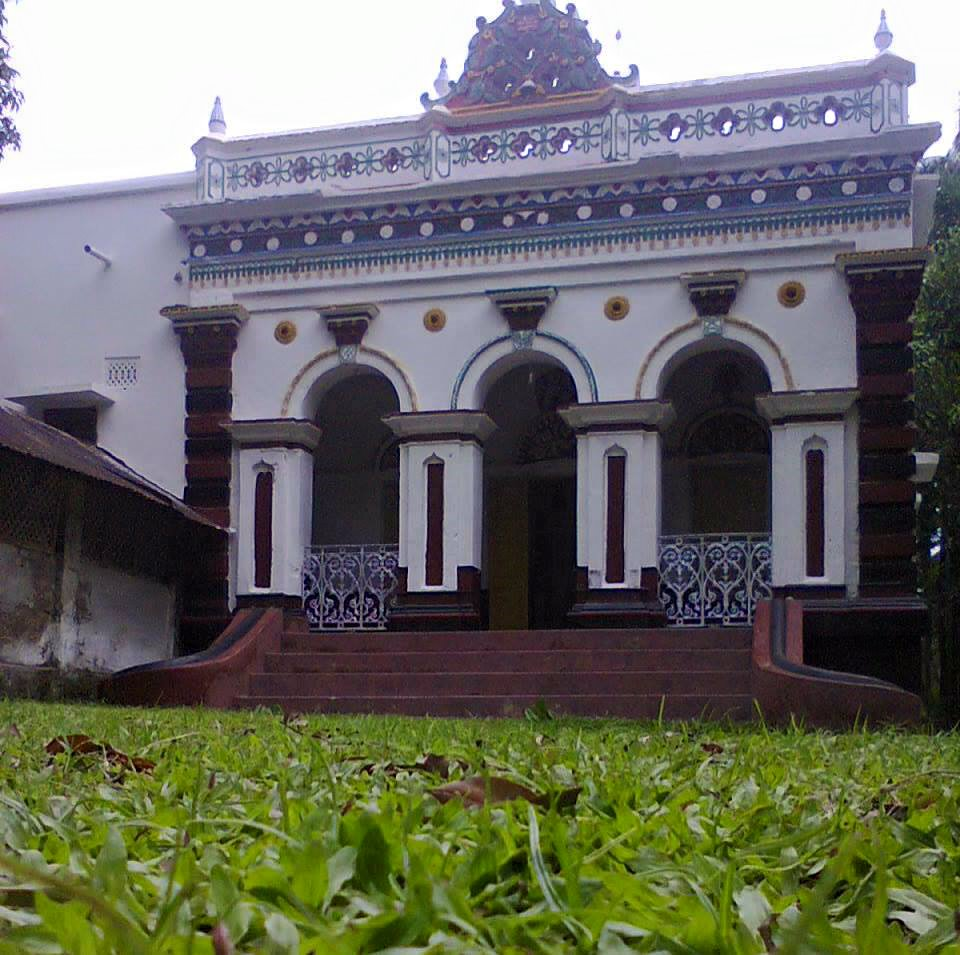
Rajganj Mia Bari

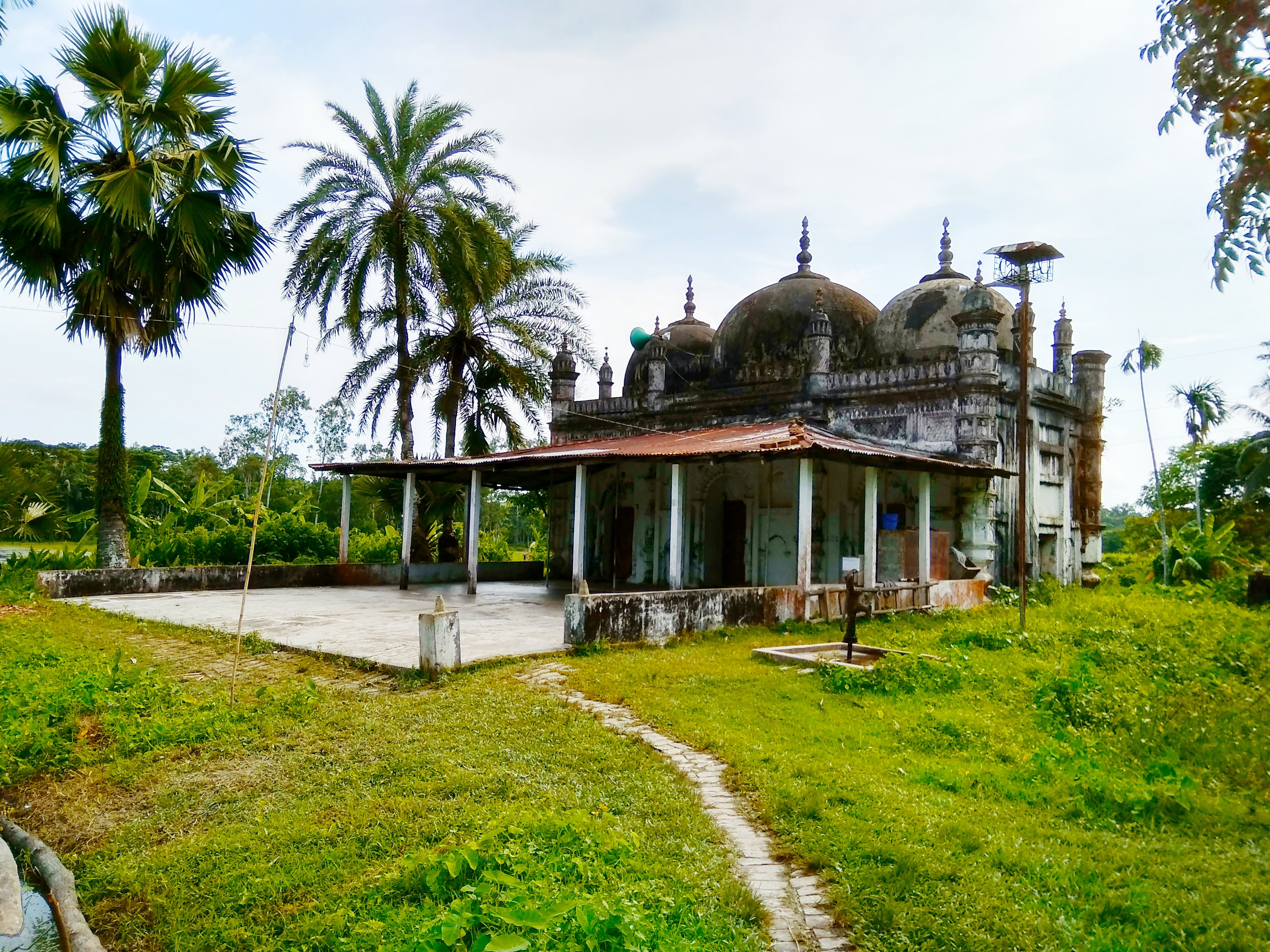
Ramadan Miah Mosque

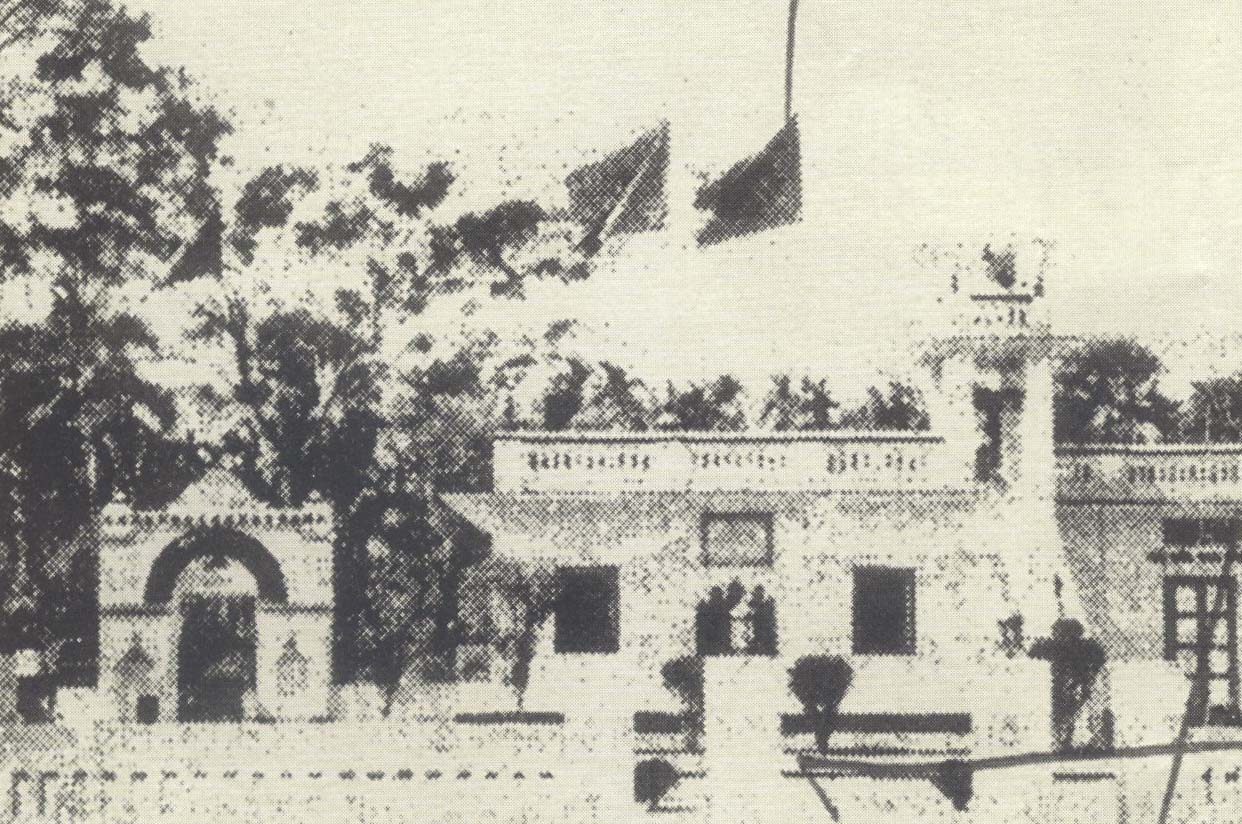
Dayra Sharif of Shyampur

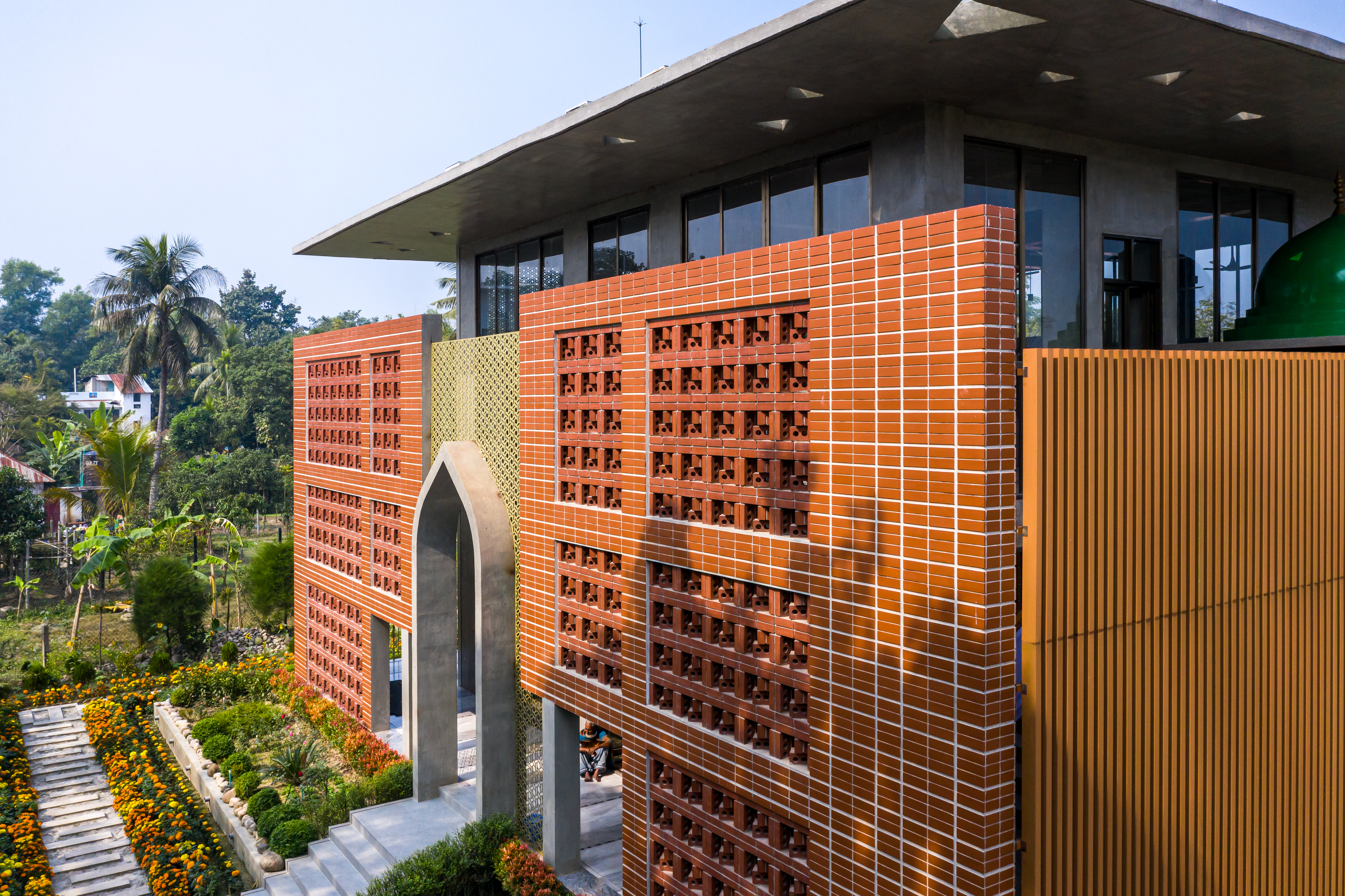
Nolua Miah Bari Jame Masjid, Senbagh

=== Sports and games ===
Cricket is a popular sport in Noakhali, and players from this district form a part of the East Zone. Football is also a common sport and the multi-use Shaheed Bulu Stadium is known to have hosted the National Football League and the Bangladesh Football League. It is also the home ground of Greater Noakhali's own football team, NoFeL SC. Board and home games such as Dosh Fochish and its modern counterpart Ludu, as well as Carrom Board, Sur-Fulish, Khanamasi and Chess, are very popular in the region. Nowka Bais is a common traditional rowing competition during the monsoon season when rivers are filled up, and much of the land is under water. Fighting sports include Kabaddi, Latim and Lathi khela.

== Demographics ==
Historical population
Year	Pop.	±% p.a.
1974	1,355,636	—
1981	1,796,909	+4.11%
1991	2,216,685	+2.12%
2001	2,577,244	+1.52%
2011	3,108,083	+1.89%
2022	3,625,442	+1.41%

According to the 2022 Census of Bangladesh, Noakhali District had 776,070 households and a population of 3,625,442 with an average 4.62 people per household. Among the population, 823,404 (22.71%) inhabitants were under 10 years of age. The population density was 984 people per km^{2}. Noakhali District had a literacy rate (age 7 and over) of 75.52%, compared to the national average of 74.80%, and a sex ratio of 1094 females per 1,000 males. Approximately, 18.00% of the population lived in urban areas. The ethnic population was 1,004.

Religions in Noakhali District (2022)
Religion	Percent
Islam	95.89%
Hinduism	4.06%
Other or not stated	0.05%

Religion in present-day Noakhali District
Religion	1941 (Note: 1941 figures use Ramganj, Begumganj, Senbagh, Sudharam, Companiganj and Hatiya thanas of erstwhile Noakhali district. District and thana (now Upazila) borders have shifted slightly since. As Ramganj was divided into Ramganj and Chatkhil upazilas in 1984, current population ratios have been used to estimate the 1941 population of the current Chatkhil upazila and religious distributions inside thanas were assumed to be homogenous.)		1981		1991		2001		2011		2022	
Religion	Pop.	%	Pop.	%	Pop.	%	Pop.	%	Pop.	%	Pop.	%
Islam	764,183	81.80%	1,664,972	92.66%	2,070,660	93.41%	2,439,333	94.65%	2,965,950	95.43%	3,476,457	95.89%
Hinduism	169,044	18.09%	129,469	7.21%	142,070	6.41%	136,140	5.28%	140,541	4.52%	147,154	4.06%
Others (Note: Including Christianity, Buddhism, or not stated)	1,010	0.11%	2,468	0.13%	3,955	0.18%	1,771	0.07%	1,592	0.05%	1,831	0.05%
Total population	934,237	100%	1,796,909	100%	2,216,685	100%	2,577,244	100%	3,108,083	100%	3,625,442	100%

Islam is the largest religion, with nearly 96% of the population. Hinduism is the largest minority religion, with over 4% of the population. In 2011, Muslims were 95.43% of the population while Hindus were 4.52%. There is a small population of 900 Catholics mainly in Noakhali Sadar upazila dating to the Portuguese influence over Bengal and some 800 Buddhists in Noakhali city along with Sonaimuri and Senbagh upazilas.

== Education ==
School attendance rate is 74.40% for the five to 24 years age group.

In Noakhali, there are 1,243 Primary Schools (Government: 776, Non-government: 329, Community: 76, Satellite: 62), 289 High Schools, 161 Madrashas (Senior Madrasha: 30, Dakhil and Alim Madrasha: 131), five Technical Institutions (Youth Training Center: two, PTI: one Technical School and College: two, 35 Colleges (Government: eight, Private: 27), one Medical Assistant Training School (MATS), one Agricultural Training Institute, one Government Medical College, one Homeopathic Medical College, one Textile Engineering College and one Science and Technology University.

=== History of education system ===
The quality of the education system in this district is commendable. But it is necessary to look back at what the education system was like before. At the beginning of the Mughal and British rule, the education system was generally dependent on ‘tol’ schools and maktabs. These taught Arabic, Persian and Sanskrit. However, the education system gradually improved and the Minor School was established. There was only one English high school in the year of 1857. There were 69 students. In the next four years, the number of students stood at 71. But in the year 1871, the students' number reach number at 596, as well as the number of government and aided schools reached 26. In the survey of 1872, there were 74.66% of the Muslim population but their literacy rate was only 20% of the total population at that time. However, the literacy rate of Muslims increased very significantly in the next decade. The total number of schools was 2,775 in the year 1895. At that time, some changes in education policy closed many schools, so the number of schools dropped to 1,330 in the year of 1898. The number of students in this district was more than 12,000 in the year. In Noakhali, there were only five English high schools in 1905. Among them were Noakhali Zilla School, which was established in 1850 and was included as a Zilla School in 1853, Feni High School (now Feni Government Pilot High School) which was established in 1886, Lakshmipur High School (now Lakshmipur Adarsha Samad Government High School) which was established in 1889, Sandwip Kargil High School now Kargil Government High School (1902). Since then, educational institutes increased a lot until 1950. In the year of 1914, there were 5 more high schools were established in this district. They are Arun Chandra High School which was founded by the Bhulua Zamindar called Arun Chandra Singh Bahadur, Rajganj Union High School which was founded by Syed Sultan Alam Chowdhury and Rajgonj Banik family, Noakhali Ahmadiya High School, Begumganj High School and Khilpara High School which was situated at Ramganj Police Station. Noakhali Government Girls' High School was established in 1934 by Uma Devi. The number of high schools reached around 60 in the middle of the twentieth century. However, there was no other college besides Feni Government College, which was founded in 1922. So Chowmuhani College was established in 1943, laying the foundation by Dr. Magnad Saha. This college is now known as Chowmuhani Government S.A College. SA College was named after the fighter, Saleh Ahmed. On the other hand, Noakhali Government College was established in 1963, Noakhali Government Women's College in 1970, Noakhali Science and Technology University in 2005 and Abdul Malek Ukil Medical College, Noakhali was established in 2008. From then till today the education system of this district has reached the threshold of improvement.

=== Educational institutions ===
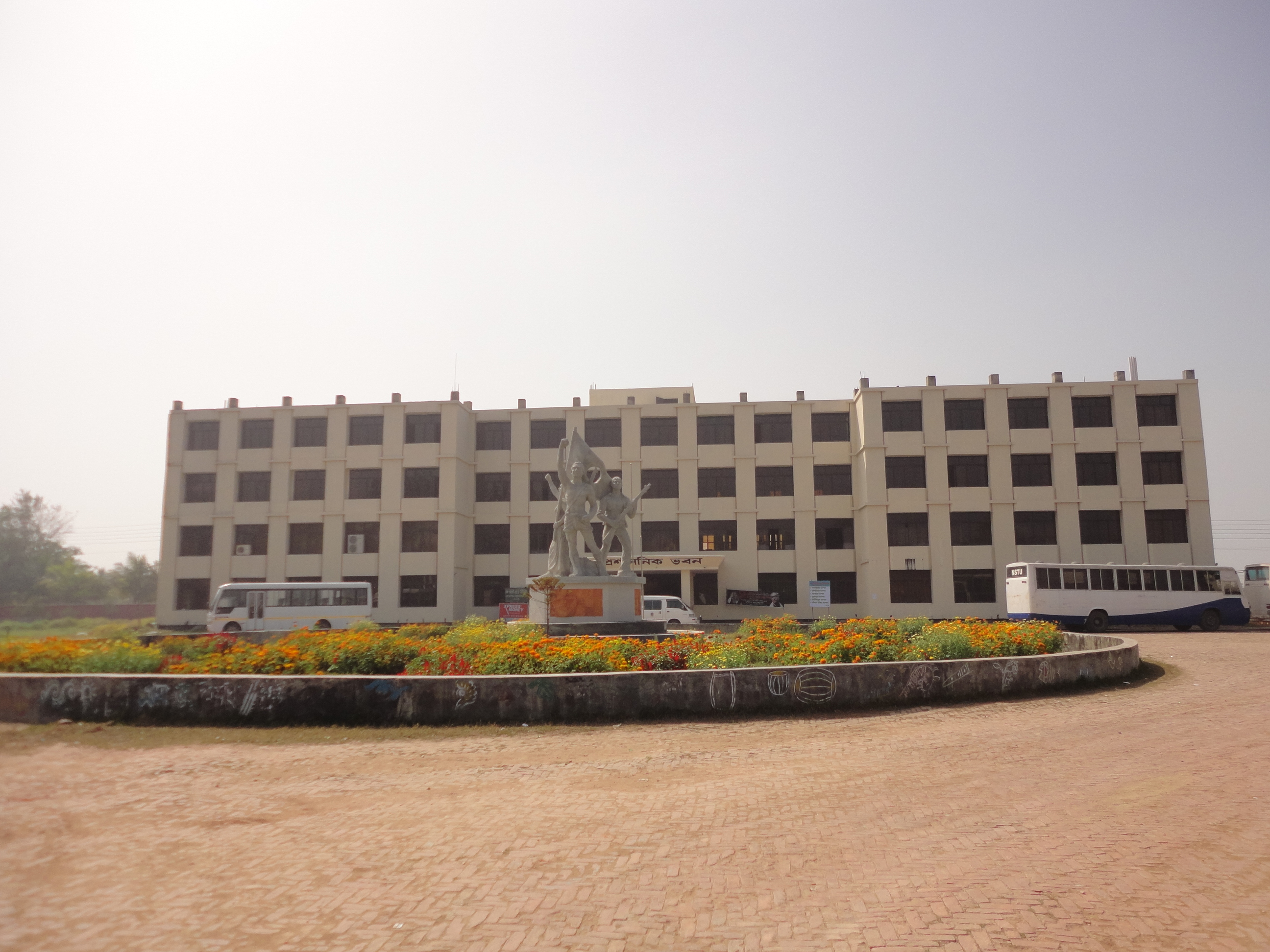
The Noakhali Science and Technology University.

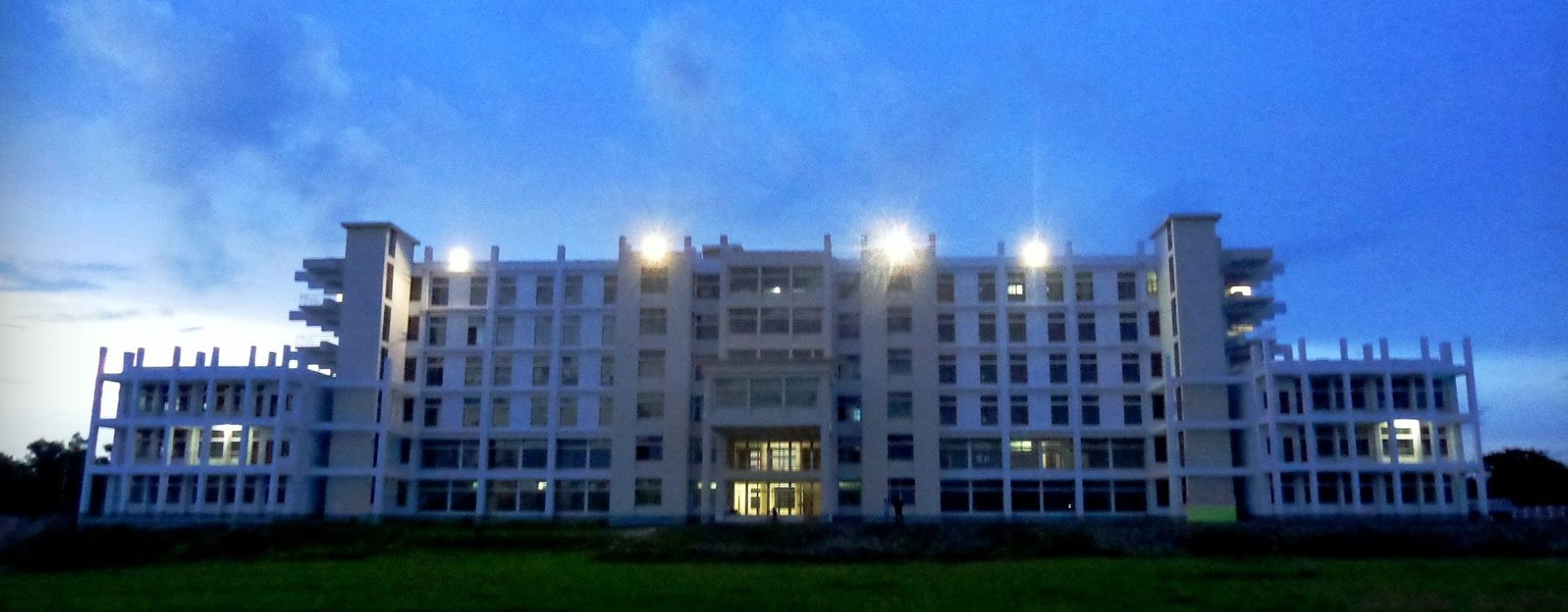
The Noakhali Medical College in Chowmuhani.

University

- Noakhali Science and Technology University

Medical Colleges

- Noakhali Medical College, Chowmuhani

Colleges

- Begumgonj Textile Engineering College, Noakhali, Chowmuhani
- Chowmuhani Government Saleh Ahmed College
- Noakhali Government College, Maijdee
- Noakhali Government Women's College, Maijdee
- Sonapur College, Noakhali

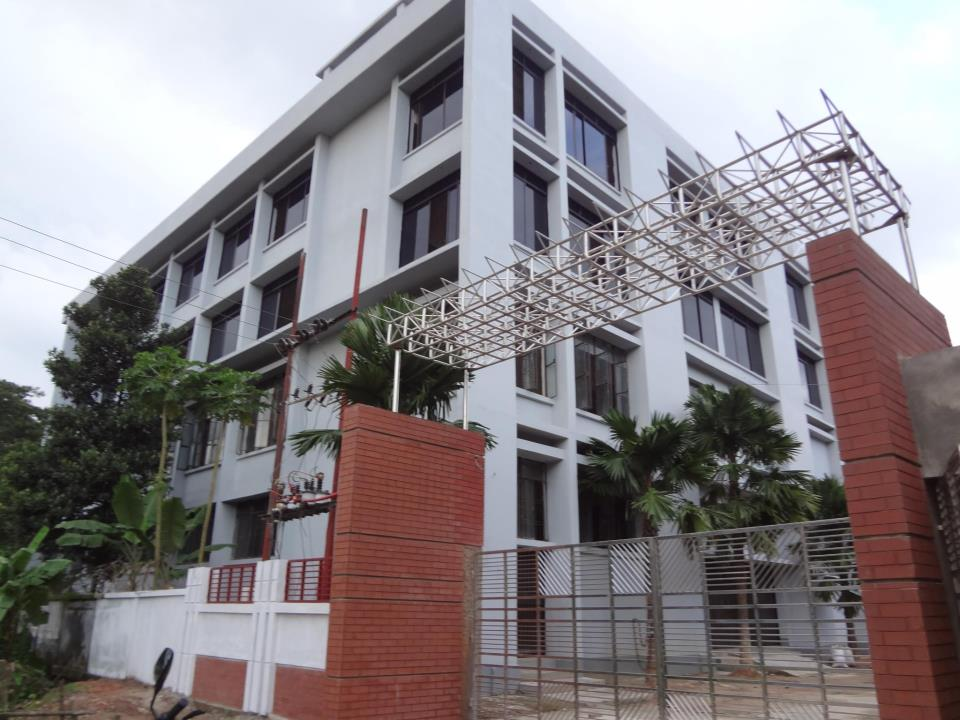
Campus of Begumgonj Textile Engineering College.

Schools

- Basurhat A. H. C. Government High School, Companigonj
- Chatkhil P.G. Govt. High School, Chatkhil
- Noakhali Govt. Girls' High School, Maijdee
- Noakhali Medical Assistant Training School, Maijdee
- Noakhali Zilla School, Maijdee
- Sonaimuri Model High School, Sonaimuri

=== Health ===
Noakhali district has one medical college, one general hospital (250 beds), eight Upazila health complexes (total 331 beds), 25 union sub-centers, 59 Union health and family welfare centers, one TB clinic, two school health clinics, one NGO clinic and three mother and children welfare clinics (Total 30 beds). There are 60 private hospitals and 115 diagnostic centers. 247 community clinics are now functioning. The activities of the Medical College Hospital is now in General Hospital.

Coverage of households having access to safe drinking water is 90%, and coverage of households having access to sanitary latrines is 75%.

== Transport ==
Noakhali district is connected by road, railway and waterway.

Airport

The Bangladesh government has declared the constitution of an airport in Noakhali Sadar Upazila, which is Maijdee.

Road

Noakhali is well connected with the Bangladeshi capital city of Dhaka and the port city of Chittagong. By road the distance between Dhaka and Noakhali is 151 km (94 mi). The distances from Chittagong and Comilla are 134 km (83 mi) and 95 km (59 mi) respectively. Buses are the most common form of transport and run to a wide range of destinations within and outside the district. A number of independent transport companies operate buses, trucks and other vehicles from different parts of Noakhali to Feni, Chandpur, Comilla, Dhaka and Chittagong. Trucks carry the majority of goods transported in the district.

Rail

Inter-City train the "Upakul Express" and Mail train "Noakhali Express" operate between Noakhali station and Kamalapur Railway Station in Dhaka. The local train that operates between Noakhali station and Laksam Railway Junction of Comilla stops at seven railway stations in Noakhali District—Noakhali (Sonapur), Harinarayanpur, Maijdee Court, Maijdee, Chowmuhani, Bazra and Sonaimuri.

Water transport

The Southern part of the Noakhali District and Hatiya Upazila is well connected by water transport. Hatiya island is isolated from the mainland but is accessible from Noakhali by sea-truck, from Chittagong by steamer, and from Dhaka by launch.

== Places of interest ==
=== Nijhum Dwip ===
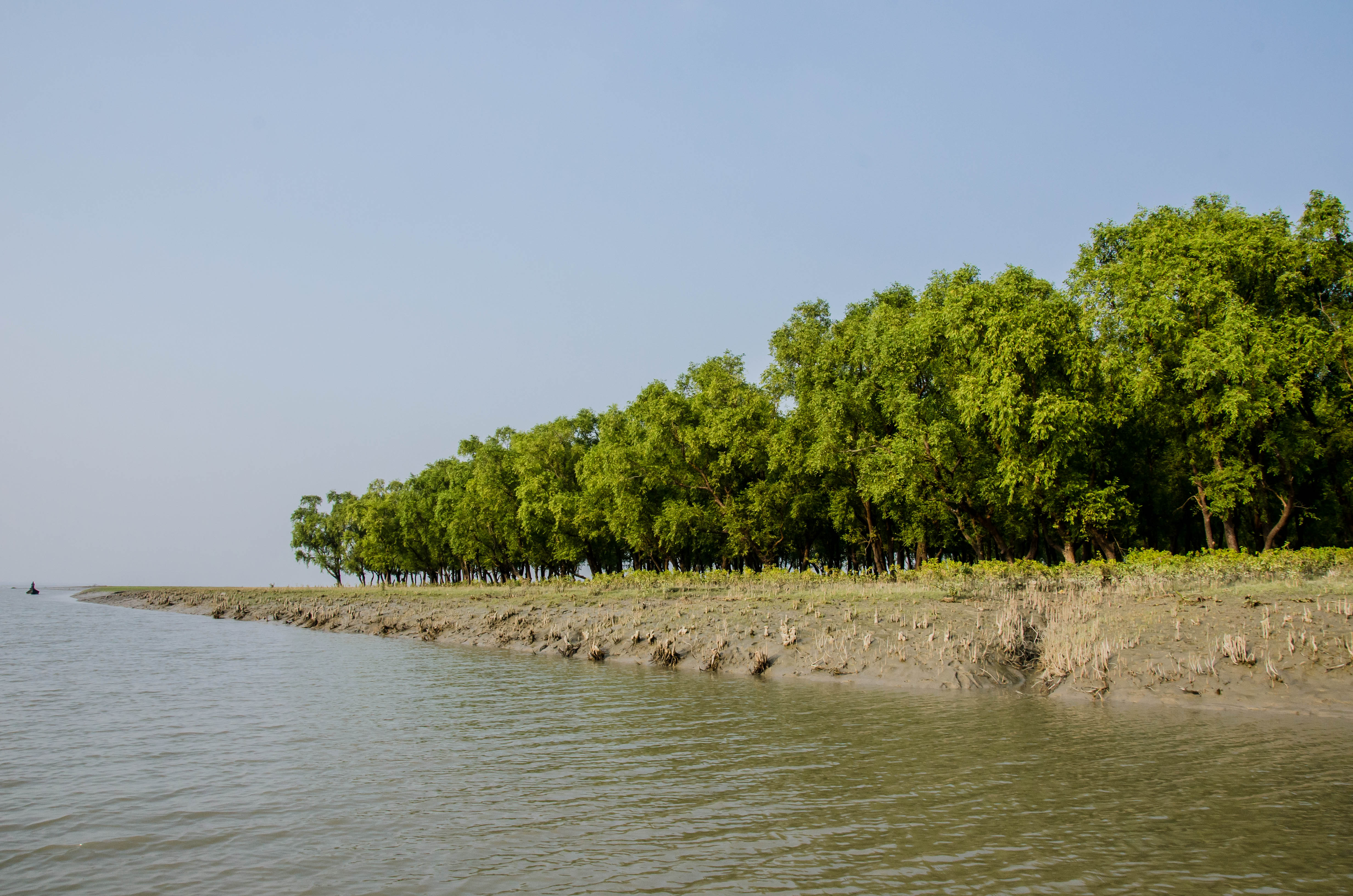
Nijhum Dwip (03)

Nijhum Dwip (Char Osmani, Baluar Char, Golden Island ) is a small island under Hatiya upazila of Noakhali. A cluster of islands (mainly, Ballar Char, Kamlar Char, Char Osman and Char Muri) emerged in the early 1950s as alluvium in the shallow estuary of the Bay of Bengal on the south of Noakhali. These new sandbanks first drew the attention of a group of fishermen, who named it Baular Char. In 1974 the Forest Department began an aforestation program for twenty years on the north side of the island. Covering an area of 9,000 acres (3,600 ha), it has now developed into a deep forest with a variety of plant species. Among the trees Keora is often seen. Besides this Gewa, Kankra, Bain, Babul, Karamja, Pashur and many other species are in evidence. It was renamed 'Nijhum Dweep' by former Minister Amirul Islam Kalam in 1979 after observing its isolation and mild nature.

During winter, thousands of migratory birds flock to the island. The fishermen use the airy and sunny land as an ideal place for drying their catches from the sea. Sometimes they construct straw huts on the island as seasonal residences.

On 8 April 2001, the then government declared the 40,390 acres (16,350 ha) of forest of the Jahajmara range including 9,550 acres (3,860 ha) of forest land on Nijhum Dweep as a national park to protect the development of the biodiversity of the forest.

=== Musapur Closure ===
It is located on the bank of the Feni river, in Companygonj upazila. The Musapur Closure Dam, which was constructed at a cost of Tk 194 crore at Musapur under Companiganj Upazila of the district, has ushered in a new prospect to the people living around it. The dam was constructed applying workforce of around 6,000 labourers and is supposed to prevent salinity to about 1.30 lakh hectares of cropland under 14 upazilas in Noakhali, Comilla and Chandpur districts. However, a certain portion of the dam was washed away within three hours of its construction; later with the joint efforts of locals and the Water Development Board (WDB) here, the erosion could be prevented.

== Notable residents ==
- Moeen U Ahmed, was the thirteenth chief of army staff of the Bangladesh Army from 15 June 2005 to 15 June 2009. He was born in Alipur village, Begumganj, Noakhali.
- Moudud Ahmed, former Vice President of Bangladesh, Prime Minister of Bangladesh, was member of 8th Parliament for the Noakhali-5 constituency.
- Muzaffar Ahmad, popularly known as "Kakababu", one of the founders of the Communist Party of India, was educated at Noakhali Zilla School.
- Kamrul Ahsan, Served as Ambassador of Bangladesh to Russia, Canada and Singapore and former Secretary to the Government.
- Bir Sreshtho Mohammad Ruhul Amin, Bangladesh Navy engine room artificer posthumously awarded the nation's highest bravery award for service during the Bangladesh War of Independence
- Jharna Dhara Chowdhury, social activist and Secretary of the Gandhi Ashram Trust in Noakhali. Awarded the Ekushey Padak for social service (2015) and Padma Shri award (2013).
- Kabir Chowdhury, was an academic, essayist, materialist, translator, cultural worker, civil society activist in Bangladesh
- Motaher Hussain Chowdhury, a Bengali writer, was born in Noakhali. Special work: Songskriti Kotha
- Mufazzal Haider Chaudhury, educator and a martyr of the Bangladesh War of Independence, was born in Khalishpur village in what is now Begumganj Upazila
- Munier Choudhury, Bangladeshi educator, playwright, literary critic and political dissident. He was a victim of the mass killing of Bengali intellectuals in 1971
- Shirin Sharmin Chaudhury, First lady speaker of the Bangladesh parliament.
- Zahurul Haq, a sergeant in the Pakistan Air Force, whose arrest in the Agartala Conspiracy Case and 1969 death in custody led to mass protests, graduated from Noakhali Zilla School.
- Abu Belal Muhammad Shafiul Haque, was a four-star rank army general and the Former (17th) chief of army staff of the Bangladesh Army, in office from 2015 to 2018.
- M. A. Hashem, was a Bangladeshi businessman and the founding chairman of Partex Group. He served as member of Parliament as part of the Bangladesh Nationalist Party.
- Annisul Huq, was an entrepreneur, TV show host and the former mayor of Dhaka North City Corporation. He was born in Kabirhat, Noakhali.
- Tabarak Husain, career foreign service officer, former foreign secretary of Bangladesh and former Bangladesh ambassador to United States.
- Muhammad Ishaq, Bangladeshi historian
- Abul Kashem, pioneer and the architect of the historic Language Movement
- Serajul Alam Khan, is a political theorist and founder of "Sadhin Bangla Nucleus" a secret organisation, which theorised the creation of Bangladesh
- Wahiduddin Mahmud, an adviser of the interim government of Bangladesh.
- A. B. M. Musa, awarded the Ekushey Padak for journalism in 1999, attended Noakhali Zilla School.
- Obaidul Quader, Former general secretary of the Bangladesh Awami League and Minister of Road Transport and Bridges, was born in Bara Rajapur village
- Abdus Salam (1910–1977), former editor of the Pakistan Observer, later the Bangladesh Observer, Ekushey Padak winning journalist
- Golam Sarwar, Secretary-General of the SARRC.
- Abdus Shakur, was a former Secretary to the Government and a leading litterateur and musicologist
- Abdul Malek Ukil, a drafter of the Constitution of Bangladesh, member of parliament, Minister of Health, and Minister of Home Affairs, was born in Rajarampur village, Noakhali Sadar Upazila.

== See also ==
- Districts of Bangladesh
- Administrative geography of Bangladesh
