= Maijdee Court =

City in Chattogram Division, Bangladesh

Maijdee মাইজদী
- City
- Noakhali Municipality
- Location within Chittagong division Location within Bangladesh
- Coordinates: 22°50′N 91°6′E
- Country: Bangladesh
- Division: Chittagong
- District: Noakhali
- Upazila: Noakhali Sadar
- Incorporated: 1953

Area
  - Total: 23.79 km^{2} (9.19 sq mi)

Population (2022)
  - Total: 132,185
  - Density: 5,556/km^{2} (14,390/sq mi)
- Time zone: UTC+6 (BST)
- Postal code: 3800
- Website: Noakhali Municipality

Maijdee Court (Bengali: মাইজদী কোর্ট), or just Maijdee (Bengali: মাইজদী) is a city in Noakhali District, in south-eastern Bangladesh. It contains the administrative headquarters of Noakhali District in Chattogram Division, Bangladesh. The governing municipality, called Noakhali Municipality, had a population of 132,185 at the 2022 census, in an area of 23.79 square kilometres (9.19 sq mi). It consists of 9 wards and 36 mahallas.

== Background ==
In 1948, the district headquarters at Sudharam, considered the main city of Noakhali, were submerged by the Meghna River. As a temporary measure, the affected population was relocated eight kilometers to the north to Maijdee. In 1953, the establishment of Noakhali Municipality was officially announced through a gazette notification. It encompassed various mouzas of Kadir Hanif Union, including the old town areas of Kalitara, Sonapur, and Maijdee. Concerns arose about the risk of Maijdee facing a similar fate due to river erosion, prompting authorities to consider relocating the headquarters again. However, protests by locals in the 1960s led to a decision to retain Maijdee as the district headquarters. Subsequently, Maijdee emerged as the new urban center of Noakhali.

== Demographics ==
Religions in Noakhali Municipality (2011)
Religion	Percent
Islam	91.21%
Hinduism	8.23%
Other or not stated	0.56%

According to the 2022 Bangladesh census, Noakhali Municipality had a population of 132,185 and a literacy rate of 90.12%.

At the 2011 Bangladesh census, the municipality had 20,222 households and a population of 107,654. 20,909 (19.42%) were under 10 years of age. It had a literacy rate (age 7 and over) of 75.34%, compared to the national average of 51.8%, and a sex ratio of 959 females per 1000 males.

== Climate ==
Climate data for Majidee (1991–2020, extremes 1883-present)
Month	Jan	Feb	Mar	Apr	May	Jun	Jul	Aug	Sep	Oct	Nov	Dec	Year
Record high °C (°F)	30.5 (86.9)	34.5 (94.1)	36.6 (97.9)	39.3 (102.7)	38.0 (100.4)	38.0 (100.4)	37.0 (98.6)	36.6 (97.9)	37.0 (98.6)	36.4 (97.5)	34.0 (93.2)	31.2 (88.2)	39.3 (102.7)
Mean daily maximum °C (°F)	24.9 (76.8)	28.3 (82.9)	31.8 (89.2)	33.5 (92.3)	33.3 (91.9)	32.1 (89.8)	31.2 (88.2)	31.6 (88.9)	31.9 (89.4)	31.7 (89.1)	29.5 (85.1)	26.0 (78.8)	30.5 (86.9)
Daily mean °C (°F)	18.7 (65.7)	21.9 (71.4)	25.9 (78.6)	28.3 (82.9)	28.9 (84.0)	28.8 (83.8)	28.4 (83.1)	28.6 (83.5)	28.6 (83.5)	27.8 (82.0)	24.6 (76.3)	20.4 (68.7)	25.9 (78.6)
Mean daily minimum °C (°F)	14.0 (57.2)	16.7 (62.1)	20.9 (69.6)	23.9 (75.0)	25.1 (77.2)	26.0 (78.8)	26.0 (78.8)	26.1 (79.0)	26.0 (78.8)	24.8 (76.6)	20.8 (69.4)	16.1 (61.0)	22.2 (72.0)
Record low °C (°F)	4.8 (40.6)	10.0 (50.0)	12.0 (53.6)	14.5 (58.1)	19.6 (67.3)	20.9 (69.6)	19.8 (67.6)	22.9 (73.2)	22.0 (71.6)	18.8 (65.8)	10.6 (51.1)	10.4 (50.7)	4.8 (40.6)
Average precipitation mm (inches)	8 (0.3)	22 (0.9)	65 (2.6)	131 (5.2)	332 (13.1)	561 (22.1)	672 (26.5)	533 (21.0)	393 (15.5)	245 (9.6)	48 (1.9)	7 (0.3)	3,017 (118.8)
Average precipitation days (≥ 1 mm)	1	2	3	7	14	20	25	24	19	10	2	1	128
Average relative humidity (%)	79	76	76	78	81	86	88	87	86	83	80	80	82
Mean monthly sunshine hours	211.0	219.1	239.2	229.5	204.3	148.5	135.6	158.1	163.4	213.5	233.5	214.8	2,370.5
Source 1: NOAA
Source 2: Bangladesh Meteorological Department (humidity 1981-2010)

== See also ==
- Upazilas of Bangladesh
- Districts of Bangladesh
- Divisions of Bangladesh
- Upazila
- Thana
