= Harun ur Rashid =

Bangladeshi police officer

- হারুন অর রশিদ
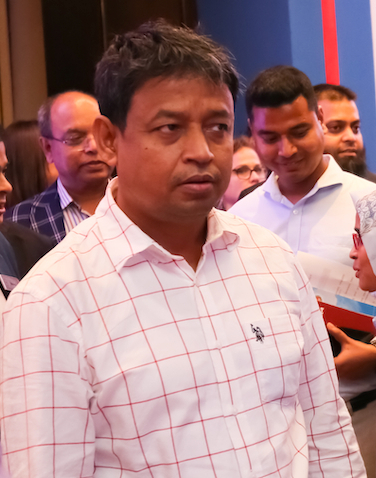
- Harun ur Rashid at the US Embassy Dhaka in 2023

Chief of DMP Detective Branch
- In office 13 July 2022 – 31 July 2024
- Appointed by: Minister of Home Affairs
- Succeeded by: Moha. Ashrafuzzaman

Personal details
- Born: Mithamain, Kishoreganj District, Bangladesh
- Education: University of Dhaka
- Awards: BPM (bar)(revoked); PPM (bar)(revoked)

Harun ur Rashid (Bengali: হারুন অর রশিদ; commonly known as DB Harun) is a former police officer who served as the chief of the DMP detective branch of Bangladesh police. On 13 August 2024, he was named as one of the 7 accused in the illegal shooting and killing of various students across Dhaka during the Bangladesh Quota Reform Movement, along with former prime minister Sheikh Hasina, former minister Obaidul Quader, former minister Asaduzaman Khan Kamal, and police officer Biplob Kumar Sarker.

== Early life ==
He was born in Hossainpur village, Mithamain Upazila, Kishoreganj. His parents are Abdul Hashem and Jahura Khatun. He pursued his academic career in sociology, earning both an honours and an MSS degree from the University of Dhaka. He later completed his LLB from Jahangirnagar University.

== Career ==
Harun ur Rashid, deputy commissioner of the Lalbagh Division of the Dhaka Metropolitan Police, assaulted Zainul Abdin Farroque, Bangladesh Nationalist Party's member of parliament and chief opposition whip, during an anti-government protest. A. B. M. Ashraf Uddin, member of parliament, filed an attempted murder case of Zainul Abedin Farroque against 25 police officers, including Harun and ASP Biplob Kumar Sarker. Mohammad Hasibul Haque, Dhaka metropolitan magistrate, rejected the case against the police officers on 4 September 2012.

On 9 December 2012, he was present at the murder of Biswajit Das but did not intervene.

In February 2013, he was awarded a medal by the Bangladesh Police, which The Daily Star described sarcastically as an award for beating up an opposition member of parliament.

Harun ur Rashid was elected secretary general of the Bangladesh Police Service Association in January 2016 while Asaduzzaman Mia was president of the association. On 5 May 2016, Sub Inspector Azharul Islam demanded 50 million taka from Amber Denim, part of Amber Group, which Showkat Aziz Russell owned, and threatened to destroy his business on behalf of his senior officer Harun ur Rashid. Showkat Aziz Russell sent letters to various branches of the government and trade bodies seeking protection from Harun ur Rashid, then superintendent of police of Gazipur District. Harun was provided an address in the United States where he demanded the money be sent. Journalists in Gazipur District reported being harassed by personnel of the Detective Branch for reporting on extortion activities of Harun ur Rashid. He was briefly transferred following allegations by the Bangladesh Nationalist Party that he was supporting government candidates during local elections.

On 2 December 2018, Harun ur Rashid was appointed superintendent of police of Narayangaj District before the general election after the previous superintendent of police, Anisur Rahman, was transferred at the request of the Bangladesh Nationalist Party, as his wife, Fatema Tuzzahura, was a member of parliament of the Awami League. The Bangladesh Nationalist Party used the expression "Out of the frying pan into the fire" to describe the situation following the transfer.

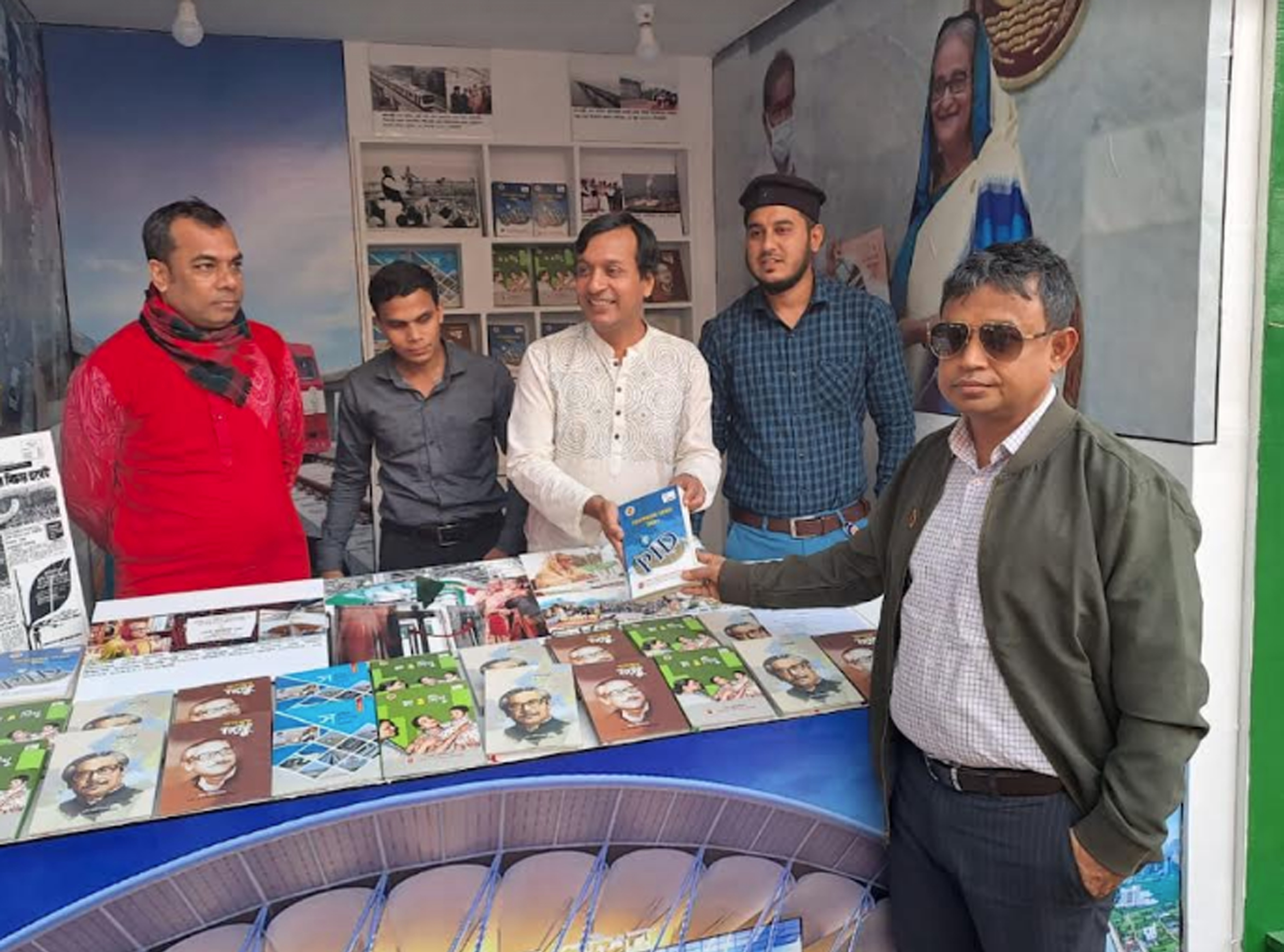
Rashid at the 2023 Ekushey book fair

In August 2019, Harun ur Rashid received a medal from the Bangladesh Police Dhaka range.

Harun ur Rashid claimed Detective Branch unit of Narayanganj District arrested the wife and minor son of Showkat Aziz Russell, son of the founder of Partex Group M. A. Hashem, and allegedly recovered drugs, bullets, and liquor from their car in Narayanganj on 2 November 2019. His account did not held up, as CCTV footage from the residence of Showkat Aziz Russell in Gulshan, Dhaka, showed his family members being detained at his residence without informing the Gulshan Police Station per the law. On 3 November 2019, Harun ur Rashid was transferred from the post of superintendent of police of Narayanganj District to the Training and Reserve unit at the police headquarters while facing a number of criminal allegations. The transfer order was signed by Dhananjay Kumar Das, the deputy secretary at the Ministry of Home Affairs. Showkat Aziz Russell secured bail from the Bangladesh High Court on 4 November 2019 and alleged Harun-or-Rashid tried to extort money from him. M. A. Hashem claimed Harun ur Rashid tried to extort 80 million taka from his son Showkat Aziz Russell and filed cases over drugs because of his refusal to pay. Asaduzzaman Khan, minister of home affairs who had refused to talk to Harun at a public function, assured the media of an investigation against Harun ur Rashid in the presence of AKM Mozammel Haq, head of the cabinet committee on law and order. On 13 November 2019, Harun ur Rashid and his fellow police officers assaulted the referee of a friendly football match. He was the secretary general of the Bangladesh Police Service Association.

Harun ur Rashid was appointed deputy commissioner of Dhaka Metropolitan Police on 14 May 2020.

On 2 May 2021, Harun ur Rashid was promoted to additional deputy inspector general.

He was promoted to deputy inspector general on 13 May 2022, just after 1 year of being promoted to additional DIG. He was appointed chief of the Detective Branch of DMP on 13 July 2022 from additional commissioner of the Detective Branch.

On 31 July 2024, the chief of the Detective Branch of Dhaka Metropolitan Police (DMP), DIG Harun ur Rashid, was transferred to become additional commissioner (crime and operations) of DMP. This was done as a result of allegations of police brutality against student activists amid the quota reform movement.

On 5 August 2024, senior officials, including Harun, gathered at the Central Command and Control Unit in Dhaka. Police officers across the city were instructed to escalate their use of force, guided by surveillance footage. Harun, confident in quelling the student protests, reportedly urged the deputy commissioner of police in Uttara to disperse demonstrators by firing on them. The deputy commissioner, however, indicated that the large crowd—over 25,000 people—made it impossible to control the situation through force alone.

Despite this, Harun and other senior officials continued to pressure officers to use force as the protesters advanced towards key locations like Banani and the Prime Minister's Office. Orders to open fire were issued, but some officers refused to comply, stating the situation was beyond control. Harun, confident in an impending military intervention, continued to issue orders. However, when the crowd reached the Ganabhaban, Harun reportedly became silent and motionless, witnessing the events unfold on surveillance cameras.

After the fall of the Sheikh Hasina-led Awami League government, many cases were filed against him, including crimes against humanity and murders.

== Internet meme ==
Harun ur Rashid gained wide public attention for videos in which he was seen offering meals to various public figures, including politicians of the opposition party, actors, businessperson, and models who visited the Detective Branch office. The footage, which he publicized himself, became widely discussed and later turned into an internet meme, with some informally referring to the practice as "Haruner bhater hotel" (Harun's rice hotel).
