= Feni Sadar Upazila =

Feni Sadar ফেনী সদর
- Upazila
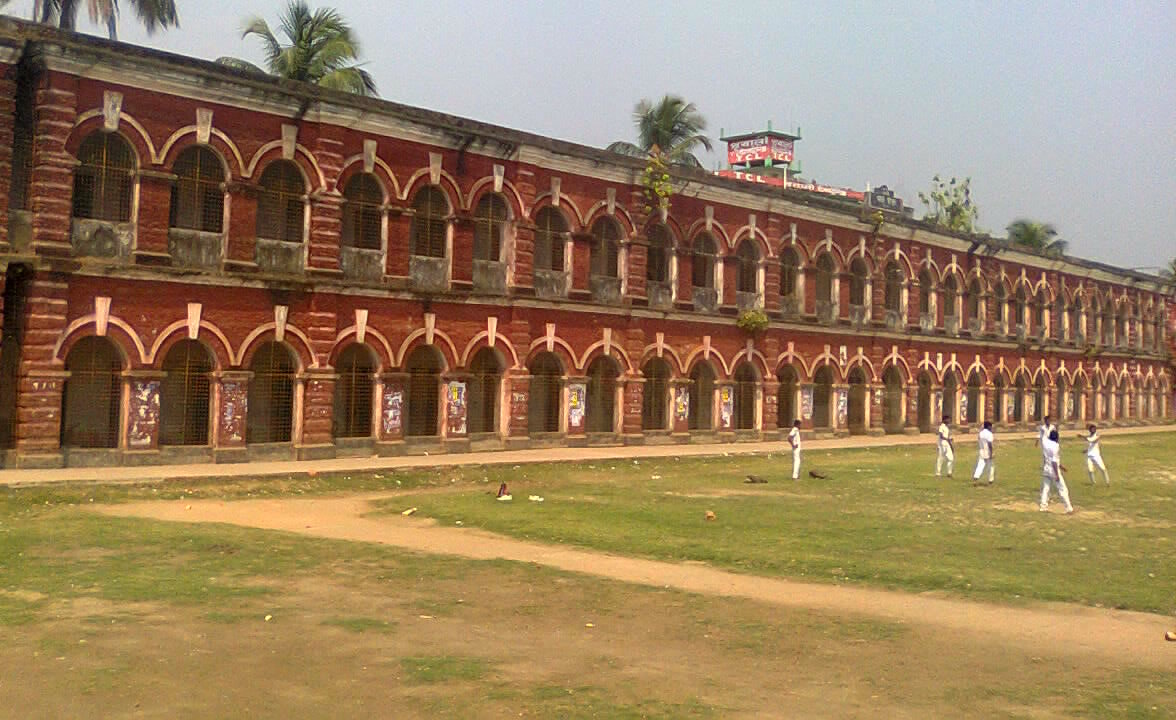
- Feni Govt. Pilot High School, Feni Sadar upazila

- Coordinates: 23°1′N 91°23.5′E
- Country: Bangladesh
- Division: Chittagong
- District: Feni
- Headquarters: Feni

Area
  - Total: 226.19 km^{2} (87.33 sq mi)

Population (2022)
  - Total: 634,321
  - Density: 2,804.4/km^{2} (7,263.3/sq mi)
- Time zone: UTC+6 (BST)
- Postal code: 3900
- Area code: 0331
- Website: sadar.feni.gov.bd

Feni Sadar Upazila mauza geocode map

Feni Sadar (Bengali: ফেনী সদর) is an upazila of Feni District in the Division of Chittagong, Bangladesh. The district headquarters and all other administrative offices are located here.

== Geography ==
Feni Sadar is located at 23.0167°N 91.3917°E. It has 97,869 households and a total area of 226.19 km^{2}.

== Demographics ==
Religions in Feni Sadar Upazila (2022)
| Religion | Percent |
| Islam | 93.26% |
| Hinduism | 6.64% |
| Other or not stated | 0.10% |

According to the 2022 Bangladeshi census, Feni Sadar Upazila had 144,296 households and a population of 634,321. 9.34% of the population were under 5 years of age. Feni Sadar had a literacy rate (age 7 and over) of 83.17%: 84.87% for males and 81.55% for females, and a sex ratio of 96.18 males for every 100 females. 272,382 (42.94%) lived in urban areas.

As of the 2011 Census of Bangladesh, Feni Sadar had 97,869 households and a population of 512,646. 113,461 (22.13%) of the inhabitants were under 10 years of age. Feni Sadar had an average literacy rate of 62.84%, compared to the national average of 51.8%, and a sex ratio of 1012 females per 1000 males. 156,971 (30.62%) of the population lived in urban areas.

== Points of interest ==
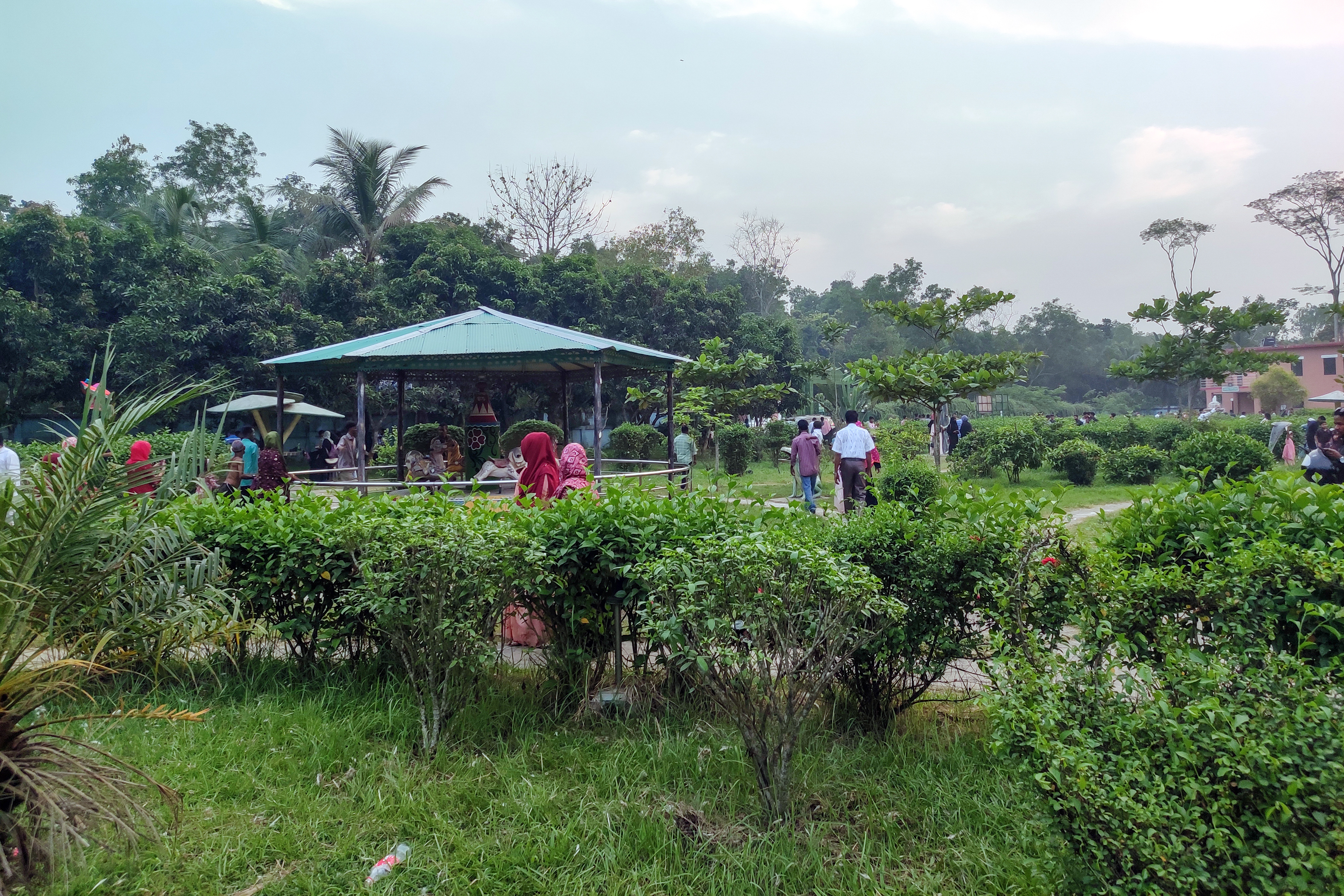
Paved paths lead visitors around Kazirbag Eco-Park.

Kazirbag Eco-Park, on the north side of the Feni, Bangladesh–Parshuram road about 4.5 kilometres (2.8 mi) from the center of Feni, is a 4.75 acres (1.92 ha) landscaped park with animals in enclosures.

== Administration ==
UNO: Md. Nazmul Hasan.

Feni Sadar Upazila is divided into Feni Municipality and 12 union parishads: Baligaon, Chonua, Dholia, Dhormapur, Fazilpur, Farhadnagar, Kalidah, Kazirbag, Lemua, Motobi, Panchgachia, and Sarishadi. The union parishads are subdivided into 134 mauzas and 125 villages.

Feni Municipality is subdivided into 18 wards and 35 mahallas.

== Notable people ==
- Khawaja Ahmed, member of parliament

== See also ==
- Upazilas of Bangladesh
- Districts of Bangladesh
- Divisions of Bangladesh
- Administrative geography of Bangladesh
