= Barkat Ullah Bulu =

Bangladeshi politician

- বরকত উল্লাহ বুলু

State Minister of Commerce
- In office 10 October 2001 – 23 May 2003

Member of Parliament
- In office 25 January 2009 – 20 November 2013
- Preceded by: Mahbubur Rahman
- Succeeded by: Md. Mamunur Rashid Kiron
- Constituency: Noakhali-3
- In office 5 March 1991 – 13 July 2001
- Preceded by: Mostafizur Rahman
- Succeeded by: MA Hashem
- Constituency: Noakhali-2

Personal details
- Party: Bangladesh Nationalist Party

Barkat Ullah Bulu (born 20 December 1956) is a Bangladesh Nationalist Party politician and a former Jatiya Sangsad member representing the Noakhali-2 and Noakhali-3 constituencies in the 5th, 6th, 7th and 9th parliament. He served as the state minister of commerce during 2001–2003.

== Career ==
Bulu was elected to parliament from Noakhali-3 as a Bangladesh Nationalist Party (BNP) candidate in 2008. He is the joint secretary general and vice-chairman of the BNP.
