= Mahmudur Rahman Belayet =

Bangladeshi politician

Member of Bangladesh Parliament
- In office 1986–1988
- Preceded by: A B M Taleb Ali
- Succeeded by: Mahbubur Rahman

Personal details
- Party: Bangladesh Awami League
- Spouse: Farida Khanam

Mahmudur Rahman Belayet was a Bangladesh Awami League politician and a member of parliament for Noakhali-3.

== Career ==
Belayet was elected to parliament from Noakhali-3 as a Jatiya Party candidate in 1986 and 1988. He is a former president of the Noakhali District unit of the Bangladesh Awami League.
