= Zainul Abdin Farroque =

Bangladeshi politician

- জয়নুল আবেদীন ফারুক
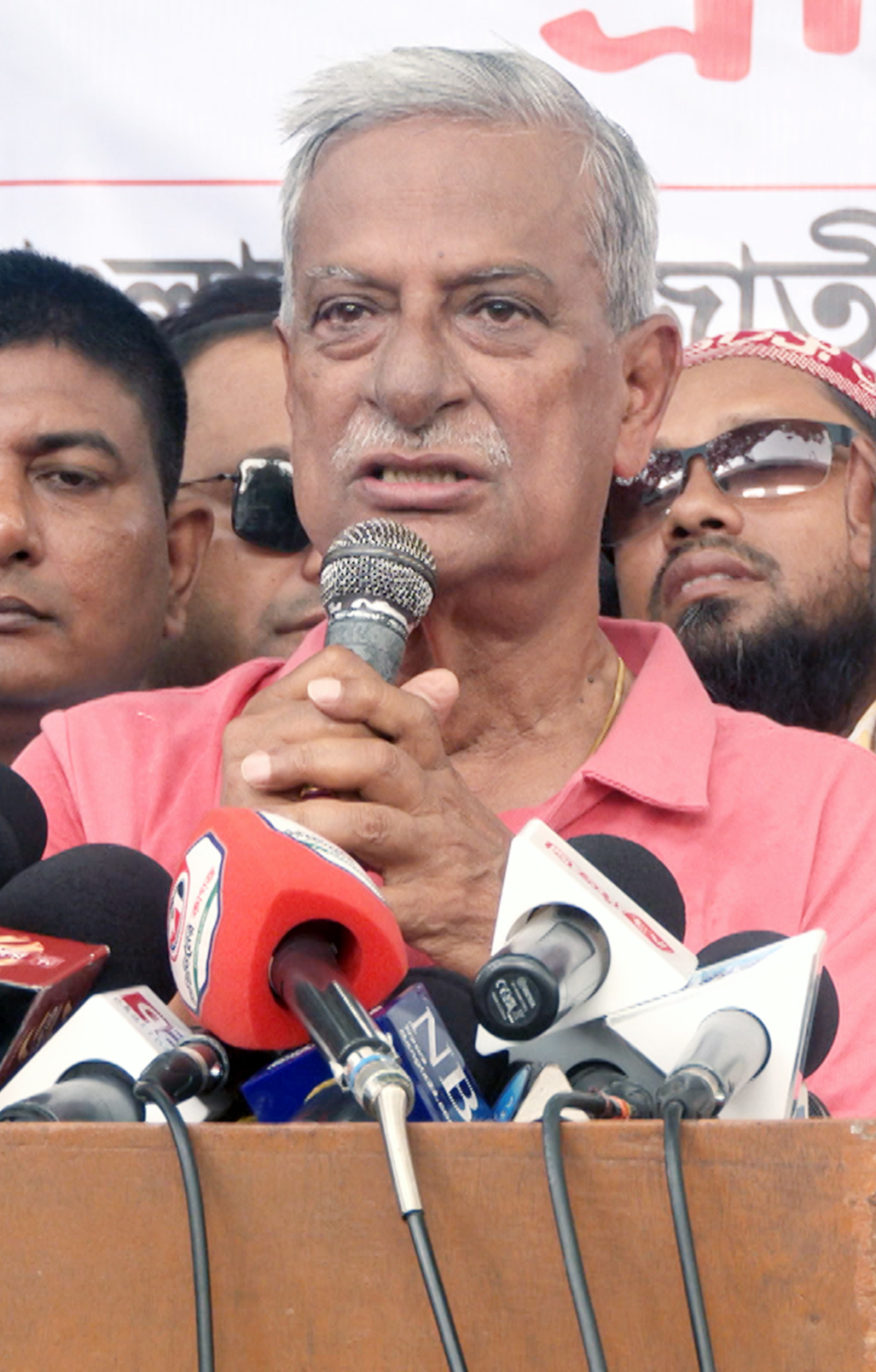
- Zainul Abdin Farooq, adviser to BNP Chairperson Khaleda Zia, at a protest meeting organized in front of the National Press Club.-2024

Member of National Parliament
- Incumbent
- Assumed office 17 February 2026
- Preceded by: Morshed Alam
- Constituency: Noakhali-2
- In office 29 December 2008 – 9 January 2014
- Preceded by: MA Hashem
- Succeeded by: Morshed Alam
- Constituency: Noakhali-2
- In office 20 March 1991 – 29 October 2006
- Preceded by: Moudud Ahmed
- Succeeded by: Mahbub Uddin Khokon
- Constituency: Noakhali-1

Personal details
- Born: 10 December 1949 (age 76) Noakhali District, East Pakistan
- Party: Bangladesh Nationalist Party

Military service
- Branch/service: Mukti Bahini
- Battles/wars: Bangladesh Liberation War

Zainul Abdin Farroque (Bengali: জয়নুল আবেদীন ফারুক; born 10 December 1949) is a Bangladeshi politician from the Bangladesh Nationalist Party and a member of parliament representing Noakhali-2 constituency. Earlier he also represented Noakhali-1in Bangladesh Jatiya Sangsad.

== Early life ==
Zainul Abdin Farroque was born on 10 December 1949.

== Career ==
In 2009, Farroque was elected to parliament as an opposition member and appointed the opposition whip. On 6 July 2011 he was injured by members of the Bangladesh Police in an opposition demonstration near the Bangladesh Parliament. He sued the police officers involved and filled a 100 million taka lawsuit against the government. The case was dismissed after investigators submitted a Metropolitan Magistrate Mohammad Hasibul Haque blaming Farroque for the incident.

Farroque was arrested on 3 July 2017 by the Bangladesh Police on cases that accused him of sabotage during protests against the government. He was granted bail on 6 September 2017 in two cases over protests against the Bangladesh Awami League government. He is an adviser to former prime minister and chairman of Bangladesh Nationalist Party, Khaleda Zia.

== Police harassment ==
=== Police attack in 2011 ===
On July 6 and 7, 2011, the Bangladesh Nationalist Party (BNP) called for a hartal (strike). During the first day of the strike, Manik, along with opposition Chief Whip Farroque and party MPs, led a protest march in front of the Parliament House. At that time, the police tried to stop the protest. During a heated exchange with the police, Additional Police Commissioner Harun-Ur-Rashid and Assistant Commissioner Biplob Kumar Sarkar attacked Zainul Abedin Farroque. The police officers began beating the MP and kicked him with their booted feet. As they started hitting him with batons and rifle butts, he became bloodied and ran for his life.

When BNP MPs tried to file a case regarding the incident that day, BNP MP Ashraf Uddin Nizam was not allowed to enter the police station. The case was later filed in court, but the court dismissed it. On the other hand, the police filed a case against Zainul Abedin Farroque and 11 others.

After the fall of the Awami League government during the student and public uprising on August 5, 2024, Zainul Abedin Farroque filed an attempted murder case against the police on August 19 at Sher-e-Bangla Nagar Police Station. Harun-Ur-Rashid and Biplob Kumar Sarkar were named as accused in the case. The case was filed under sections 323, 325, 326, 307, 206, 109, and 34 of the Bangladesh Penal Code.

Zainul Abedin Farroque, advisor to BNP chairperson Khaleda Zia, at a protest meeting in front of the National Press Club on October 2, 2024.

=== Arrest in 2013 ===
During a protest against the government, the Bangladesh Police arrested Farroque on July 3, 2013, accusing him of sabotage. He was granted bail in September 2007 in two cases related to protests against the Bangladesh Awami League government. He is an advisor to former prime minister and Bangladesh Nationalist Party chairperson Khaleda Zia.

== Personal life ==
Farroque was married to BNP politician Kaniz Fatema, who died in 2026. The couple has one daughter.
