= Mujibpedia =

Encyclopedia on Sheikh Mujibur Rahman

- Cover of Mujibpedia
- Editor: Kamal Chowdhury; Farid Kabir; Abu Md. Delwar Hossain
- Original title: মুজিবপিডিয়া
- Language: Bengali
- Subject: Sheikh Mujibur Rahman
- Genre: Encyclopedia
- Publication date: December 2022
- Publication place: Bangladesh
- Media type: Printed
- Pages: 1000
- Website: mujibpedia.org

Mujibpedia is an encyclopedia of the history of Bangladesh's related movements and the history of independence and the personal and political career of Sheikh Mujibur Rahman. It was published in 2022.

== Editors ==
The two-volume encyclopedia was edited by Kamal Chowdhury, Farid Kabir and Abu Md. Delwar Hossain. History and Culture Circle Bangladesh Limited published the first edition of the encyclopedia on 7 December 2022.

== Statistics ==
Mujibpedia is written by 97 authors, researchers, historians and journalists. It contains 591 entries and 750 historical photographs. The online version of the encyclopedia also has about 100 specially created videos.

== History ==
Mujibpedia's articles and historical photographs have been researched for two years. On 19 October 2021, History and Culture Circle Bangladesh officially started to prepare the encyclopedia. The study included details of Sheikh Mujibur Rahman's personal and political life, actions and ideals, Mujib's involvement in various political struggles, as well as the history of Bangladesh's independence. The City Bank funds its research and publications. It was planned for release on Victory Day 2021. Later on 7 December 2022 its first edition was published. As a single book, Mujibpedia gets a sales center under its own name at the Ekushey Book Fair 2023.
