= Rafiquzzaman Bhuiyan =

Bangladeshi politician

Member of Bangladesh Parliament
- In office 1979–1986
- Preceded by: Khawaja Ahmed
- Succeeded by: Mostafizur Rahman

Personal details
- Political party: Bangladesh Nationalist Party

Rafiquzzaman Bhuiyan is a Bangladesh Nationalist Party politician and a former member of parliament for Noakhali-2.

== Career ==
Bhuiyan was elected to parliament from Noakhali-2 as a Bangladesh Nationalist Party candidate in 1979.
