= Noakhali-3 =

Bangladeshi parliamentary constituency

Coordinates: 22.94°N 91.10°E

- Constituency for the Jatiya Sangsad
- District: Noakhali District
- Division: Chittagong Division
- Electorate: 392,330 (2018)

Current constituency
- Created: 1973
- Party: Bangladesh Nationalist Party
- Member: Barkat Ullah Bulu
- ← 269 Noakhali-2 271 Noakhali-4 →

Noakhali-3 is a constituency represented in the Jatiya Sangsad (National Parliament) of Bangladesh since 2026 by Barkat Ullah Bulu of the Bangladesh Nationalist Party.

== Boundaries ==
The constituency encompasses Begumganj Upazila.

== History ==
The constituency was created for the first general elections in newly independent Bangladesh, held in 1973.

Ahead of the 2008 general election, the Election Commission redrew constituency boundaries to reflect population changes revealed by the 2001 Bangladesh census. The 2008 redistricting altered the boundaries of the constituency.

== Members of Parliament ==
Election	Member	Party
1973	A B M Taleb Ali	Awami League
1986	Mahmudur Rahman Belayet	Jatiya Party
1988	Mahbubur Rahman	Jatiya Party
1991	Salah Uddin Kamran	Bangladesh Nationalist Party
1996	Mahbubur Rahman	Bangladesh Nationalist Party
2008	Barkat Ullah Bulu	Bangladesh Nationalist Party
2014	Mamunur Rashid Kiron	Awami League
2026	Barkat Ullah Bulu	Bangladesh Nationalist Party

== Elections ==
=== Elections in the 2010s ===
Mamunur Rashid Kiron was elected unopposed in the 2014 general election after opposition parties withdrew their candidacies in a boycott of the election.

=== Elections in the 2000s ===
General Election 2008: Noakhali-3
Party	Candidate	Votes	%	±%
BNP	Barkat Ullah Bulu	98,537	43.6	−14.9
Independent	Mamunur Rashid Kiron	74,246	32.8	N/A
Independent	Minhaz Ahmed	46,637	20.6	N/A
AL	Mosammat Lutfunnahar Begum	4,098	1.8	−30.7
IAB	Najir Ahmad	2,688	1.2	N/A
Majority		24,291	10.7	−15.3
Turnout		226,206	79.6	+12.9
BNP hold				

General Election 2001: Noakhali-3
Party	Candidate	Votes	%	±%
BNP	Mahbubur Rahman	50,378	58.5	+13.1
AL	Mahmudur Rahman Belayet	27,978	32.5	+3.3
IJOF	Abu Sufian	6,037	7.0	N/A
Independent	Salah Uddin Kamran	883	1.0	N/A
JSD	Nurul Amin Bhuyan	478	0.6	N/A
Bangladesh Samajtantrik Dal (Mahbub)	A. F. M. Mahbubul Haque	241	0.3	−0.2
Jatiya Party (M)	A. Wahab	145	0.2	N/A
Majority		22,400	26.0	+9.8
Turnout		86,140	66.7	+4.0
BNP hold				

=== Elections in the 1990s ===
General Election June 1996: Noakhali-3
Party	Candidate	Votes	%	±%
BNP	Mahbubur Rahman	25,570	45.4	+23.2
AL	Mahmudur Rahman Belayet	16,458	29.2	N/A
Jamaat	Md. Ullah	6,038	10.7	−2.6
JP(E)	Abu Sufian	5,895	10.5	+2.2
Jatiya Samajtantrik Dal-JSD	Md. Nurul Amin Bhuiyan	1,539	2.7	−7.3
BKA	Md. Mir Omar Faruk	335	0.6	−0.4
Bangladesh Samajtantrik Dal (Mahbub)	A. F. M. Mahbubul Haque	255	0.5	−17.0
Gano Forum	Md. Bazlur Rashid Chowdhury	165	0.3	N/A
Zaker Party	Mohammad Ali	66	0.1	N/A
Majority		9,112	16.2	+13.7
Turnout		56,321	62.7	+24.7
BNP hold				

General Election 1991: Noakhali-3
Party	Candidate	Votes	%	±%
BNP	Salah Uddin Kamran	11,378	22.2	
CPB	Nurul Islam	10,082	19.7	
Bangladesh Samajtantrik Dal (Mahbub)	A. F. M. Mahbubul Haque	8,948	17.5	
Jamaat	Shamsuddin	6,803	13.3	
Jatiya Samajtantrik Dal-JSD	Md. Nurul Amin Bhuiyan	5,097	10.0	
JP(E)	Abu Sufian	4,274	8.3	
Independent	Fakhrul Islam	3,489	6.8	
BKA	Delwar Hossain	529	1.0	
NAP (Bhashani)	Harun Rashid	194	0.4	
Jatia Mukti Dal	Nur Mohammad Khan	143	0.3	
Independent	Mahmudur Rahman Belayet	100	0.2	
Independent	A. K. M. Aamin Ullah	43	0.1	
NDP	Md. Jahurul Haq	39	0.1	
Independent	T. I. M. Nurunnabi	38	0.1	
FP	A. B. M. Anwar Hossain	32	0.1	
Majority		1,296	2.5	
Turnout		51,189	38.0	
BNP hold				
