= Salah Uddin Kamran =

Bangladeshi politician

Member of Bangladesh Parliament
- In office 1991–1996
- Preceded by: Mahbubur Rahman
- Succeeded by: Mahbubur Rahman

Personal details
- Political party: Bangladesh Nationalist Party

Salah Uddin Kamran is a Bangladesh Nationalist Party politician and a former member of parliament for Noakhali-3.

== Career ==
Kamran was elected to parliament from Noakhali-3 as a Bangladesh Nationalist Party candidate in 1991.
