= Noakhali-1 =

Constituency of Bangladesh's Jatiya Sangsad

Coordinates: 23.06°N 90.97°E

- Constituency for the Jatiya Sangsad
- District: Noakhali District
- Division: Chittagong Division
- Electorate: 347,671 (2018)

Current constituency
- Created: 1973
- Party: Bangladesh Nationalist Party
- Member: Mahbub Uddin Khokon
- ← 267 Feni-3 269 Noakhali-2 →

Noakhali-1 is a constituency represented in the Jatiya Sangsad (National Parliament) of Bangladesh since 2026 by Mahbub Uddin Khokon of the Bangladesh Nationalist Party.

== Boundaries ==
The constituency encompasses Chatkhil Upazila and Sonaimuri Upazila but excluding these four union parishads of Sonaimuri Upazila: Ambarnagar, Baragaon, Bazra and Nateshwar.

== History ==
The constituency was created for the first general elections in newly independent Bangladesh, held in 1973.

Ahead of the 2008 general election, the Election Commission redrew constituency boundaries to reflect population changes revealed by the 2001 Bangladesh census. The 2008 redistricting altered the boundaries of the constituency.

== Members of Parliament ==
| Election | Member | Party |
|---|---|---|
| 1973 | A. B. M. Musa | Bangladesh Awami League |
| 1979 | Zafar Imam | Bangladesh Nationalist Party |
| 1986 | Moudud Ahmed | Jatiya Party |
| 1988 by-election | K. M. Hossain | Jatiya Party |
| 1991 | Zainul Abdin Farroque | Bangladesh Nationalist Party |
| Feb 1996 | Zainul Abdin Farroque | Bangladesh Nationalist Party |
| June 1996 | Zainul Abdin Farroque | Bangladesh Nationalist Party |
| 2001 | Zainul Abdin Farroque | Bangladesh Nationalist Party |
| 2008 | Mahbub Uddin Khokon | Bangladesh Nationalist Party |
| 2014 | H. M. Ibrahim | Bangladesh Awami League |
| 2018 | H. M. Ibrahim | Bangladesh Awami League |
| 2024 | H. M. Ibrahim | Bangladesh Awami League |
| 2026 | Mahbub Uddin Khokon | Bangladesh Nationalist Party |

== Elections ==
=== Elections in the 2010s ===
H. M. Ibrahim was elected unopposed in the 2014 general election after opposition parties withdrew their candidacies in a boycott of the election.

=== Elections in the 2000s ===
Ganatantri Party candidate Nurul Islam died days before the 29 December 2008 general election. Voting in the constituency was postponed until 12 January 2009. H. M. Ibrahim, who had earlier withdrawn in favor of Nurul Islam, ran in his place as the Grand Alliance candidate.

General Election 2008: Noakhali-1
| Party | Candidate | Votes | % | ±% |
|---|---|---|---|---|
| BNP | Mahbub Uddin Khokon | 105,380 | 54.8 | −7.1 |
| AL | H. M. Ibrahim | 80,658 | 41.9 | +8.7 |
| IAB | Abdur Rahim | 3,458 | 1.8 | N/A |
| BKA | Md. Ziaul Haq | 725 | 0.4 | N/A |
| Independent | Golam Moula | 531 | 0.3 | N/A |
| KSJL | Md. Amin Ulla | 460 | 0.2 | N/A |
| Independent | Mahbubur Rahman | 386 | 0.2 | N/A |
| Independent | Khandaker Ruhul Amin | 320 | 0.2 | N/A |
| National People's Party | Md. Mosarraf Hossain | 221 | 0.1 | N/A |
| JSD | Mohammed Harun Rashid | 161 | 0.1 | −0.4 |
| Jatiya Samajtantrik Dal-JSD | Deen Mohammad Buiyan | 50 | 0.0 | N/A |
| Majority | | 24,722 | 12.9 | −15.8 |
| Turnout | | 192,350 | 77.7 | +14.6 |
| BNP hold | | | | |

General Election 2001: Noakhali-1
| Party | Candidate | Votes | % | ±% |
|---|---|---|---|---|
| BNP | Zainul Abdin Farroque | 57,555 | 61.9 | +15.6 |
| AL | Jafar Ahmad Chowdhury | 30,876 | 33.2 | +10.3 |
| IJOF | Shibu Prasad Chandra | 3,897 | 4.2 | N/A |
| JSD | Md. Tajul Islam | 506 | 0.5 | N/A |
| Jatiya Party (M) | S. M. A. Wahab | 177 | 0.2 | N/A |
| Majority | | 26,679 | 28.7 | +5.3 |
| Turnout | | 93,011 | 63.1 | −3.1 |
| BNP hold | | | | |

=== Elections in the 1990s ===
General Election June 1996: Noakhali-1
| Party | Candidate | Votes | % | ±% |
|---|---|---|---|---|
| BNP | Zainul Abdin Farroque | 31,187 | 46.3 | +14.3 |
| AL | Md. V. P. Mostofa | 15,440 | 22.9 | +2.9 |
| JP(E) | Moudud Ahmed | 15,181 | 22.5 | −6.6 |
| Jamaat | Abu Shakher Md. Zakaria | 4,682 | 6.9 | N/A |
| Bangladesh Samyabadi Dal (Marxist-Leninist) | Mohi Uddin | 311 | 0.5 | N/A |
| Zaker Party | Nasir Uddin | 277 | 0.4 | +0.1 |
| Islami Shasantantra Andolon | Mohammad Mohsin | 184 | 0.3 | N/A |
| Independent | Master Nur Islam | 115 | 0.2 | N/A |
| Majority | | 15,747 | 23.4 | +20.5 |
| Turnout | | 67,377 | 66.2 | +33.0 |
| BNP hold | | | | |

General Election 1991: Noakhali-1
| Party | Candidate | Votes | % | ±% |
|---|---|---|---|---|
| BNP | Zainul Abdin Farroque | 21,418 | 32.0 | |
| JP(E) | Moudud Ahmed | 19,508 | 29.1 | |
| AL | Rafiq Uddin Ahmad | 13,395 | 20.0 | |
| Independent | Zafar Ahmed | 9,058 | 13.5 | |
| BKA | Nurullah Kashemi | 1,360 | 2.0 | |
| Bangladesh Janata Party | Osman Gani | 1,114 | 1.7 | |
| JSD | Kazi Md. Solaiman | 327 | 0.5 | |
| Independent | Md. Mostafa Bhuiyan | 215 | 0.3 | |
| Zaker Party | Abu Lais Ansary | 173 | 0.3 | |
| Bangladesh Inqualab Party | Ruhul Aamin Chowdhury | 129 | 0.2 | |
| FP | Md. Abduj Jaher Chowdhury | 89 | 0.1 | |
| NAP (Bhashani) | Abdul Motaleb | 61 | 0.1 | |
| Independent | Md. Khalilur Rahman Majumdar | 57 | 0.1 | |
| Bangladesh Muslim League (Yusuf) | M. N. Taher Khan | 48 | 0.1 | |
| Independent | M. A. Bari | 48 | 0.1 | |
| Majority | | 1,910 | 2.9 | |
| Turnout | | 67,000 | 33.2 | |
| BNP gain from AL | | | | |
