= Partex Group =

Bangladeshi conglomerate

- Type: Private
- Industry: Conglomerate
- Founded: 1962; 64 years ago
- Founder: MA Hashem
- Headquarters: Dhaka, Bangladesh
- Key people: Aziz Al Kaiser (chairman, Partex Star Group), Aziz Al-Mahmood (managing director, Partex Star Group), Rubel Aziz (managing director, Partex Group)
- Products: Food & beverages, steel, real estate, furniture, plastics, paper, power & energy, jute, agribusiness, shipyards, shipping, cotton, textile, construction, IT, cables, aviation, PVC, ceramics, telecommunication, oil, logistics, fisheries
- Revenue: US$800 million (2010)
- Number of employees: Over 70,000
- Website: www.partexstar.com, www.partexgroup.com, www.partex.net

Partex Group is a family-run conglomerate in Bangladesh, consisting of over 70 factories. The industries under this conglomerate include foods and beverages, steel, real estate, furniture, agribusiness, and plastics.

== History ==
The company was begun in 1962 by industrialist M. A. Hashem, with commodity trading. Now it owns over 70 subsidiaries from tobacco to consumer goods, furniture, textiles and the IT sector. It is now split into two groups to improve management of its subsidiaries - Partex Group and Partex Star Group.

Hashem founded two private banks in Bangladesh – The City Bank and United Commercial Bank Limited (UCB).

== List of companies ==
- Amber Board Mills Limited
- Amber Cotton Mills Limited (UNIT-1)
- Amber Cotton Mills Limited (UNIT-2)
- Amber Denim Limited
- Amber IT Limited
- Amber Super Paper Limited
- Amber Super Yarn Limited
- BD Hub
- Bhawal Resort and Spa
- Corvee Maritime Co. Limited
- Daily Cola Ltd.
- Danish Condensed Milk (BD) Ltd
- Danish Dairy Farm Limited
- Danish Distribution Network Limited
- Danish Foods Limited
- Danish Milk Bangladesh Limited
- Dhakacom Limited
- Fabiana Flour Mills Ltd.
- Fairhope Housing Ltd.
- Ferrotechnic Limited
- Geometric Business Development Ltd.
- Giovana Denim Mills Ltd.
- MUM Water Ltd.
- New Era Milk Processing Ltd.
- New Horizon Farms Ltd.
- New Light Star Apparels Ltd.
- Partex Accessories Ltd.
- Partex Aeromarine Logistics Ltd.
- Partex Agro Limited
- Partex Aviation Ltd.
- Partex Beverage Limited
- Partex Board Mills Limited
- Partex Builders Limited
- Partex Cables Limited
- Partex Cafe Limited (Cafe de Partex)
- Partex Ceramics Ltd.
- Partex Dairy Limited
- Partex Denim Limited
- Partex Denim Mills Limited
- Partex Energy Limited
- Partex Fashions Limited. (Red Origin)
- Partex Fisheries Ltd.
- Partex Foundry Limited
- Partex Furniture
- Partex Healthcare Ltd.
- Partex Holdings
- Partex Housing Limited
- Partex Jute Limited
- Partex Laminates Limited
- Partex Limited
- Partex Oil Tankers
- Partex Paper Mills Limited
- Partex Petro Ltd.
- Partex Plastics Limited
- Partex Power Generation Company Ltd.
- Partex Properties Limited
- Partex Pulp & Paper Mills Limited
- Partex PVC Industries Limited
- Partex Rotor Spinning Mills Limited
- Partex Shipyards Limited
- Partex Sporting Club
- Partex Sugar Mills Limited
- Partex Tissue Ltd.
- Reluce
- Royal Crown Cola Ltd.
- Rubel Steel Mills Limited
- Shubornobhumi Housing Ltd.
- Star Adhesives Ltd.
- Star Gypsum Board Mills Limited
- Star Particle Board Mills Limited
- Star Vegetable Oil Mills Ltd.
- Triple Apparels Ltd.
- Voicetell Ltd.

== See also ==
- List of companies of Bangladesh
