= Mamunur Rashid Kiron =

Bangladeshi politician

Muhammad Mamunur Rashid Kiron
- মোঃ মামুনুর রশীদ কিরন

Member of the Bangladesh Parliament for Noakhali-3
- In office 29 January 2014 – 6 August 2024
- Preceded by: Barkat Ullah Bulu

Personal details
- Born: 20 April 1961 (age 64) Noakhali, East Pakistan, Pakistan
- Party: Bangladesh Awami League

Mohammad Mamunur Rashid Kiron is a Bangladesh Awami League politician and a former Jatiya Sangsad representing the Noakhali-3 constituency. He is one of the Director of Globe Pharmaceuticals group of companies.

== Early life ==
Kiron was born on 20 April 1961. He has B.A. degree.His family have close tied to the Awami League for many generations.

== Career ==
Kiron was elected to the parliament on 5 January 2014 as a Bangladesh Awami League candidate. He is a Member of the Treasury Bench of the Parliament.
