= BRAC Bank-Samakal Literature Award =

BRAC Bank-Samakal Literary Award
- Country: Bangladesh
- Presented by: BRAC Bank and Daily Samakal
- Reward: BDT 200,000
- First award: 2011-present
- Website: www.bracbank.com/link/bracbank_samakal.html

The BRAC Bank and Daily Samakal Literature Award was launched in 2011. Later, the Young Writer's Award was dedicated in memory of the late novelist Humayun Ahmed. The award is also known as the BRAC Bank-Samakal Shahitya Puroshkar, and has three categories; poetry and novels, essays, autobiographies, travel stories and translations, and Humayun Ahmed Young Writer.

== Winners list ==
=== 2011 ===
- Syed Shamsul Haq
- Dravid Saikot
- Hasan Azizul Haq

=== 2012 ===
- Professor Dr. Anisuzzaman
- Bulbul Chowdhury
- Shuvashis Sinha

=== 2013 ===
- Moinul Ahsan Saber
- Mashrur Arefin
- Badrun Nahar

=== 2014 ===
- Harishangkar Jaldas
- Sushmita Islam
- Muzib Erom

=== 2015 ===
- Nirmalendu Goon
- Rajkumar Singha
- Swakrita Noman

=== 2016 ===
- Ahmad Rafique
- Jyoti Prakash Dutta
- Mazhar Sircar

=== 2017 ===
- Jatin Sarker
- Syed Manzoorul Islam
- Pias Majid

=== 2018 ===
- Sanjida Khatun
- Selina Hossain
- Swaralipi

=== 2019 ===
- Prof Serajul Islam Choudhury
- Helal Hafiz
- Mozaffor Hossain

=== 2020 ===
- Afsan Chowdhury
- Mohammad Rofiq
- Ronjona Bishwas
