= H. M. Ibrahim =

Bangladeshi politician

- এইচ এম ইব্রাহিম

Member of the Bangladesh Parliament for Noakhali-1
- In office 30 January 2014 – 6 August 2024
- Preceded by: Mahbub Uddin Khokon

Personal details
- Born: 6 September 1958 (age 67) Noakhali District, East Pakistan, Pakistan
- Party: Bangladesh Awami League

H. M. Ibrahim (born 6 September 1958) is a Bangladesh Awami League politician and a former Jatiya Sangsad member representing the Noakhali-1 constituency.

== Early life ==
Ibrahim was born on 6 September 1958. He studied up to HSC.

== Career ==
Ibrahim was defeated in the Noakhali-1 Parliamentary election by Bangladesh Nationalist Party Candidate Mahbubuddin Khokan on 13 January 2009. The election was held after Ganatantri Party president and AL-led alliance candidate Nurul Islam died in a fire 26 days before the election on 3 December 2008. He was elected to Parliament from Noakhali-1 in 2014, 2018 and in 2024 general elections from Awami League .
