= United Commercial Bank (Bangladesh) =

A private bank of Bangladesh

United Commercial Bank PLC

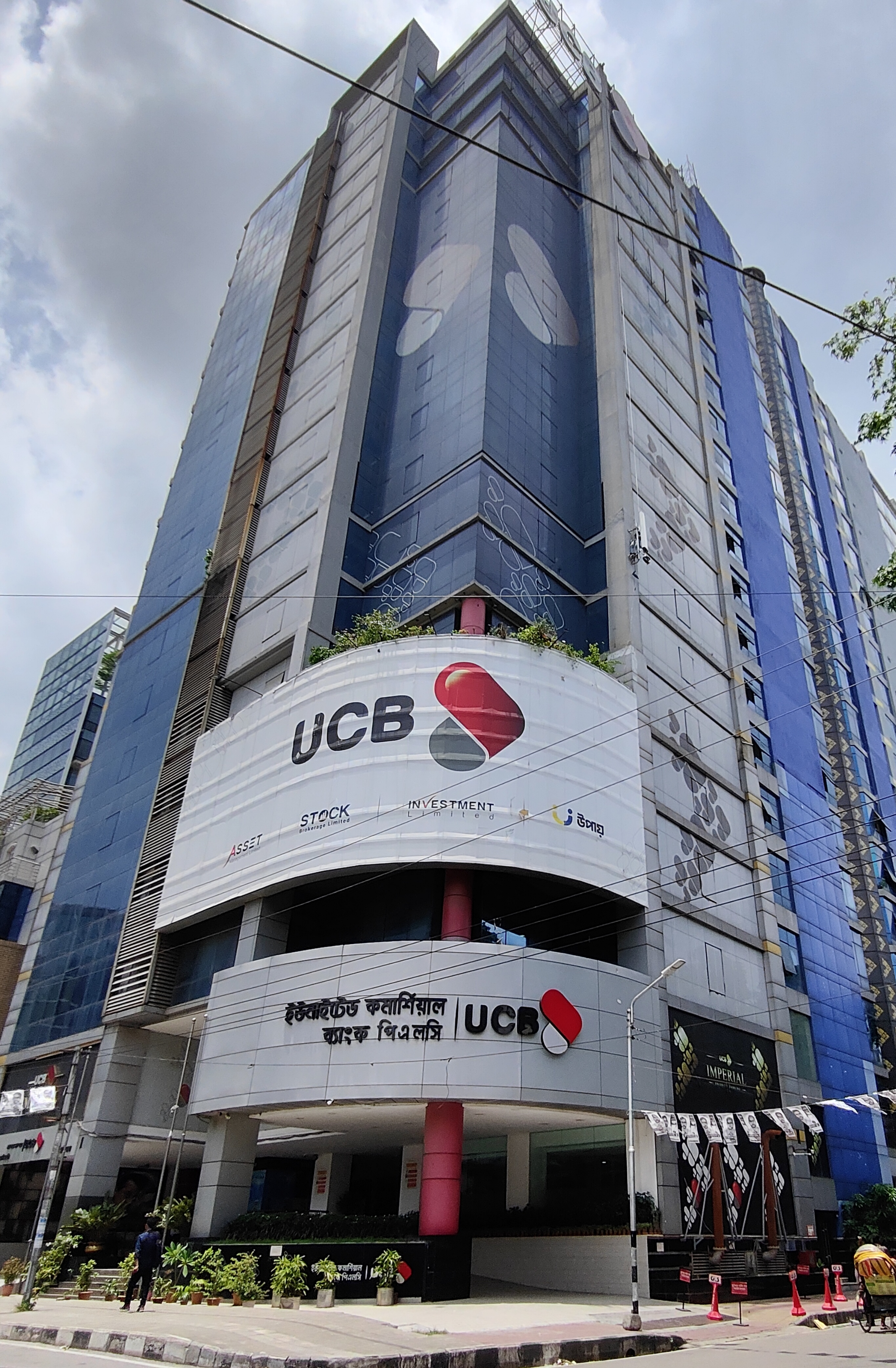
- The headquarters of UCB at Gulshan Avenue
- Native name: ইউনাইটেড কমার্শিয়াল ব্যাংক পিএলসি
- Formerly: United Commercial Bank (Bangladesh)
- Type: Public limited company, commercial bank
- Traded as: DSE: UCB; CSE: UCB
- ISIN: BD0108UCBL05
- Industry: Banking; Financial services
- Founded: June 27, 1983; 43 years ago
- Headquarters: Gulshan, Dhaka, Bangladesh
- Number of locations: 714 ATMs; 234 Branches; 187 Sub-Branches
- Area served: Bangladesh
- Key people: Sharif Zahir, Chairman & Shareholder Director; Tanvir Khan, Shareholder Director; Sajjad Hossain, Independent Director; Yusuf Ali, Independent Director; Obaidur Rahman Independent Director
- Services: Banking services; Consumer banking; Corporate banking; Islamic banking; Credit card; SME finance
- Operating income: ▲$105.7 million (2022)
- Net income: ▲$37.1 million (2022)
- Total assets: ▲$5.8 billion (2022)
- Total equity: ▲$382.9 million (2022)
- Number of employees: 5060 (2021)
- Subsidiaries: Upay; UCB Stock Brokerage Ltd.; UCB Fintech Company Ltd.; UCB Asset Management Ltd.; UCB Investment Ltd.
- Rating: AA
- Website: www.ucb.com.bd

United Commercial Bank PLC (UCB) is a commercial bank in Bangladesh. It was established in 1983.

== History ==
The bank was incorporated on 26 June 1983. The government owns shares in the bank. The bank was listed in the Dhaka Stock Exchange (DSE) by 1986 and Chittagong Stock Exchange (CSE) by 1995.

On 8 April 1993, Humayun Zahir, the first chairman of the United Commercial Bank was murdered following a dispute with other bank directors. Akhtaruzzaman Chowdhury Babu, director of UCB was suspected for the murder. On 26 August 1999, Akhtaruzzaman forcefully seized control of UCBL's board of directors during a meeting with his son, Saifuzzaman Chowdhury by gunpoint with 40 armed men. Again another chairman, Zafar Ahmed Chowdhury was forced to resign. Bangladesh Police declined to initiate any action against him citing the close association between Akhtaruzzamanu and Prime Minister Sheikh Hasina. Later, Zafar Ahmed returned to the board of directors with a court verdict in his favor.

Bangladesh Bank appointed an observer to United Commercial Bank due to ownership disputes. In 2010, Akhtaruzzaman became a director. The Anti-Corruption Commission (ACC) sued four officials of UCB and a managing director of a real estate company for embezzling 90 million Bangladeshi taka from the bank. Between 2007 and 2012, four officials of the bank stole 100 million taka from the bank using forged credit cards until they were detected in May 2012. In 2012, the Anti-Corruption Commission sued six for embezzling 129 million BDT from UCB.

In March 2016, a Chittagong Court sentenced an official of UCB to jail for allegedly helping a businessman secure 181.8 million BDT loan against a property, which was already mortgaged to Bangladesh Krishi Bank, through fraud and then laundering the money outside of Bangladesh.

In September 2017, United Commercial Bank provided loan waiver to Russel Vegetable Oils Limited, a company linked to bank director, Sultana Hashem, wife to M. A. Hashem, chairman of Partex Group. The loan waiver violated banking rules of Bangladesh.

Humayun Zahir was the first chairman of the United Commercial Bank. In 2013, Humayun Zahir's elder son Sharif Zahir was elected as the vice chairman of the bank. In 2013, M. A. Hashem was re-elected chairman of UCB.

In September, Bangladesh Bank asked UCB to provide clarifications regarding their suspected profiting from selling dollars at inflated prices during the foreign exchange market crisis. Later the complaint has been resolved, resulting in the bank being mandated to allocate 50% of its profit from dollar trading to its corporate social responsibility (CSR) funds, while the remaining 50% can be retained as income. In July, MNH Bulu, A Bangladeshi businessman filed a lawsuit against UCB seeking BDT 400 million in damages for alleged defamation caused by false charges. In May 2023, according to a report prepared in accordance with International Accounting Standard (IAS)-34, UCB disclosed a decline in its operating profit along with an increase in operating expenses.

In 2024, Sharif Zahir become the chairman of the Bank who said he was removed from the bank forcefully with the knowledge of Prime Minister Sheikh Hasina.

== Operations ==
With a network of 234 branches and 187 sub-branches, the bank offers a range of banking services. Its consumer products, including UCB Cards, have experienced growth since their introduction in 2006, reaching approximately 40,000 cardholders.

The bank listed in Dhaka Stock Exchange Limited and Chittagong Stock Exchange Limited.

== Financial activities ==
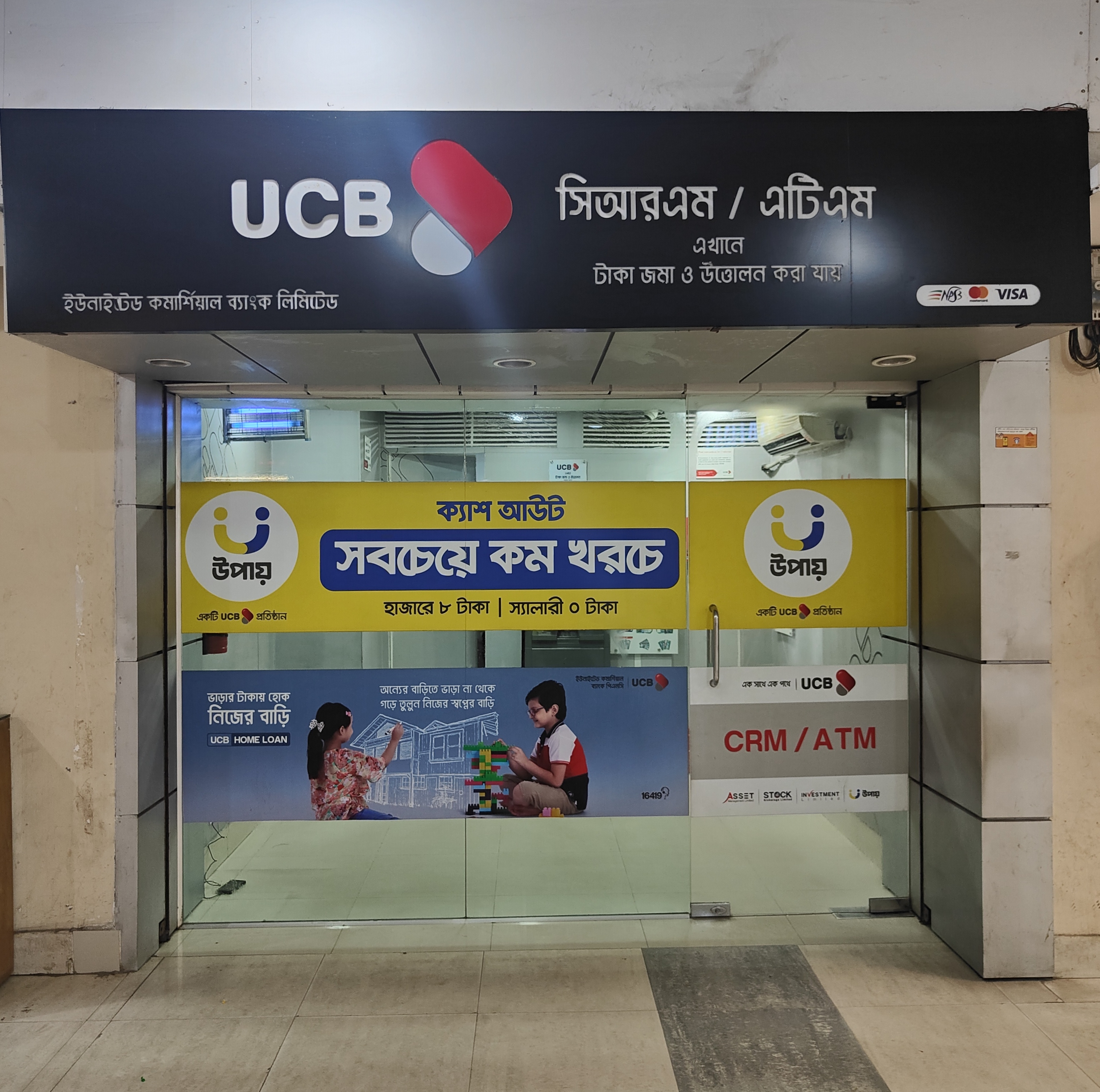
CRM/ATM booth of UCB in Mirpur

In 2009, United Commercial Bank signed a contract with the Bangladesh Cricket Board to become the official sponsor of the Bangladesh national cricket team. In September 2015, United Commercial Bank launched a new logo, designed by Rafiqun Nabi and Mustafa Manwar.

Mobile financial service (MFS), Ucash, was introduced in 2013. After eight years of services the name has been changed to Upay. In November 2020, United Commercial Bank PLC inaugurated its subsidiary, UCB Investment Ltd.

In 2021, UCB launched the MFS called Upay (উপায়), a digital financial service brand owned by UCB Fintech Company Limited, a United Commercial Bank affiliate. Upay had acquisitions with Grameenphone, Robi, and Banglalink to ensure that their users will not need an active internet connection to use the Upay application.

In 2022, UCB achieved its highest profit, exceeding US$39 million, representing a growth rate of 32% compared to the previous fiscal year. The bank plans to establish a subsidiary at this year in Singapore the United Arab Emirates and Qatar to handle remittances.

In 2024, UCB planned to take over National Bank, UCB indicated interest in purchasing NBL, which was hit hard by high loan default rates in 2022, resulting in Tk 3,285 crore in losses—the most ever recorded by Bangladesh's banking industry.

In 2025, UCB signed a five-year contract with the Bangladesh Football Federation to become the official sponsor of the Bangladesh national football team.

== Subsidiaries ==
- UCB Stock Brokerage
- UCB Investment
- UCB Asset Management
- UCB Fintech Company Limited

== Awards and recognition ==
- Received an award for excellence in the category of "Mastercard Contactless (Acquiring)" in the 'Mastercard Excellence Awards 2022'.
- Global SME Finance Award 2022
- Bangladesh's Best Bank for CSR 2023
