= Mashrur Arefin =

Bangladeshi writer, novelist, poet, translator and banker (born 1969)

- মাসরুর আরেফিন
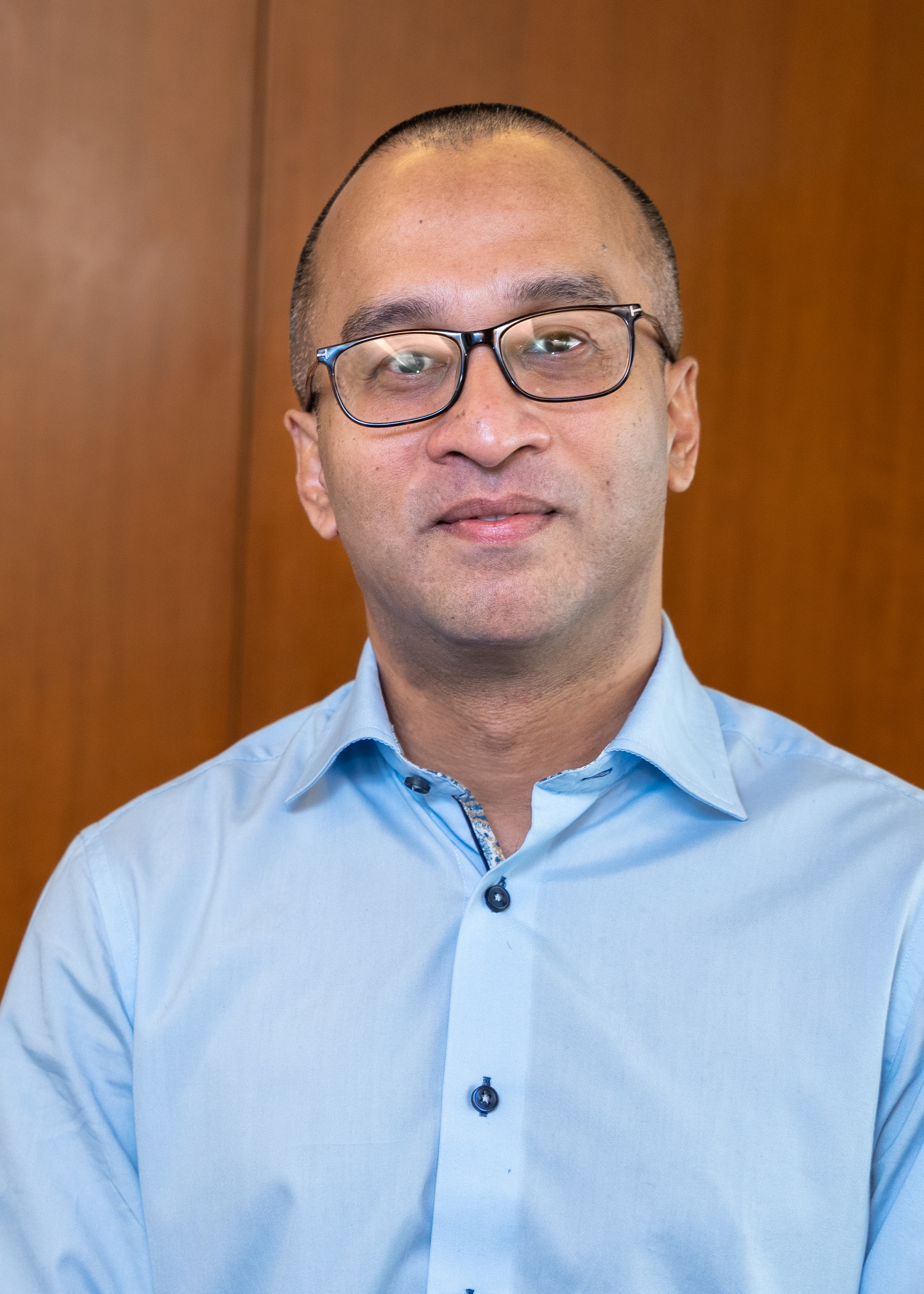
- Mashrur Arefin in 2021
- Born: S M Mashrur Arefin; 9 October 1969 (age 57); Barishal, Bangladesh
- Education: Victoria University, Melbourne; Aligarh Muslim University; University of Dhaka
- Occupations: Writer and banker
- Writing career
- Language: Bengali
- Period: 1990–present
- Notable works: Ishwardi Mayor O Mule er Golpo (Poetry), August Abchaya (The Eclipse of August, 2019), Prithibi Elomelo Sokalbelay (Poetry), Althusser (Novel), Underground (Novel), Ariyal Kha (Novel), Franz Kafka Golpo-Shomogro (Translation), Eliad (Translation)
- Notable awards: BRAC Bank-Samakal Literature Award, Gemcon Shahitya Puroshkar for August Abchaya (Novel, 2019), IFIC Bank Sahitya Puraskar 2019 for August Abchaya

Mashrur Arefin (born 9 October 1969) is a Bangladeshi writer, novelist, poet, translator and banker. He is known for his Bengali translation of Homer’s Iliad and Franz Kafka's stories, and his novels, August Abchchaya (The Eclipse of August, 2019) and Althusser (2020). He received the BRAC Bank-Samakal Literature Award for his translation of Franz Kafka's stories in 2013, he won the Gemcon Shahitya Puroshkar 2020 for his first novel August Abchhaya (The Eclipse of August). and he received IFIC Bank Literary Award 2019 for the novel August Abchaya.

Mashrur Arefin writes article about literature and literary piece on newspaper and literary supplements.

== Early life ==
He was born in Barishal. Later his family moved to Khulna and Mashrur Arefin grew up there.

After passing S.S.C and H.S.C from Barishal Cadet College he studied English Literature at Aligarh Muslim University. He then got his M.A from Dhaka University.

In 1995, Mashrur Arefin started his career at ANZ Grindlays Bank Limited as a management trainee. He completed his MBA from Victoria University, Melbourne, Australia.

== Career ==
He started his career as a management trainee at ANZ Grindlays Bank in 1995 and worked in its Australia headquarters. Later he became the Head of Consumer Finance, Bangladesh of ANZ. He also worked in Standard Chartered Bank, Qatar and ANZ Banking Group in Melbourne, Australia. He was the Director for American Express Bank, Bangladesh and also worked at Citibank N.A. for a short period as its Resident VP, Bangladesh. He was the Head of Consumer Banking at Eastern Bank Ltd after that he joined The City Bank.

Mashrur joined City Bank in 2007 as Head of Retail Banking. In January 2019 he has been appointed as the Managing Director & CEO of The City Bank Limited. He also served the bank as its Chief Communications Officer & Chief Operating Officer among other roles. He is a Director of the Bank's subsidiary remittance company in Malaysia and its merchant bank subsidiary as well.

== Writing ==
=== Ishwardi Mayor O Mule er Golpo (Poetry) ===
Ishwardi Mayor O Mule er Golpo, a book of a long poem was published in 2001 from 'Da' Prokashoni. It was his first book. Ishwardi Mayor O Mule er Golpo was an attempt to explore a new prose and imagery with Bangla language. There are few aspects readers can expect in Mashrur Arefin's writing, like twist of syntax and sentence, but he does not stick to any predetermined style. He aims to experiment with the aesthetic and come up with a new kind of taste for prose.

=== August Abchaya (Novel) ===
August Abchaya (The Eclipse of August) is his first novel. The novel is a fictional work on the assassination of the first president of Bangladesh Sheikh Mujibur Rahman. It was first published in the Ekushey Book Fair, 2019. In an interview with the Dhaka Tribune after winning the Gemcon Literary Prize, 2020, Mashrur Arefin noted:

All I can say is, ‘August Abchhaya’ is touted as a historical novel. But is it really so? It definitely isn’t one that gives its own version of why things happened the way the things happened.I believe that due to the convenience of putting books certain categories, we call 'August Abchhaya' a historical fiction just because that historical killing business is the pivot of the novel. But a pivot is only a pivot. A lot more actually happens in the outer, larger perimeters or circumference of any center.

=== Althusser (Novel) ===
His second novel is Althusser. It was named on the famous French philosopher Louis Althusser. It was first published in the Ekushey Book Fair, 2020.

=== Prithibi Elomelo Sokalbelay (Poetry) ===
Prithib Elomelo Sokalbelay is his second poetry book. It was first published in the Ekushey Book Fair, 2020.

== Recognition ==
=== Prizes for books ===
- 2013: BRAC Bank-Samakal Literature Award for Franz Kafka's stories (Translation, 2013)
- 2020: Gemcon Shahitya Puroshkar for August Abchaya (Novel, 2019)
