= Noakhali-2 =

Constituency of Bangladesh's Jatiya Sangsad

Coordinates: 22.99°N 91.23°E

- Constituency for the Jatiya Sangsad
- District: Noakhali District
- Division: Chittagong Division
- Electorate: 273,851 (2018)

Current constituency
- Created: 1973
- Party: Bangladesh Nationalist Party
- Member: Zainul Abdin Farroque
- ← 268 Noakhali-1 270 Noakhali-3 →

Noakhali-2 is a constituency represented in the Jatiya Sangsad (National Parliament) of Bangladesh since 2026 by Zainul Abdin Farroque of the Bangladesh Nationalist Party.

== Boundaries ==
The constituency encompasses Senbagh Upazila and three union parishads of Sonaimuri Upazila: Ambarnagar, Baragaon, and Nateshwar.

== History ==
The constituency was created for the first general elections in newly independent Bangladesh, held in 1973.

Ahead of the 2008 general election, the Election Commission redrew constituency boundaries to reflect population changes revealed by the 2001 Bangladesh census. The 2008 redistricting altered the boundaries of the constituency.

== Members of Parliament ==
Election	Member	Party
1973	Khawaja Ahmed	Awami League
1979	Rafiquzzaman Bhuiyan	Bangladesh Nationalist Party
1986	Mostafizur Rahman	Jatiya Samajtantrik Dal
1988		
1991	Barkat Ullah Bulu	Bangladesh Nationalist Party
Feb 1996		
June 1996		
2001	MA Hashem	Bangladesh Nationalist Party
2008	Zainul Abdin Farroque	Bangladesh Nationalist Party
2014	Morshed Alam	Bangladesh Awami League
2018		
2024	Morshed Alam	Bangladesh Awami League
2026	Zainul Abdin Farroque	Bangladesh Nationalist Party

== Elections ==
=== Elections in the 2010s ===
Morshed Alam was elected unopposed in the 2014 general election after opposition parties withdrew their candidacies in a boycott of the election.

=== Elections in the 2000s ===
General Election 2008: Noakhali-2
Party	Candidate	Votes	%	±%
BNP	Zainul Abdin Farroque	87,463	55.9	−6.3
AL	Jamal Uddin Ahmed	67,497	43.1	+14.9
Jatiya Samajtantrik Dal-JSD	Nur Islam	1,069	0.7	N/A
BJP	Mohammad Momin Ullah	452	0.3	N/A
Majority		19,966	12.8	−21.1
Turnout		156,481	82.8	+22.5
BNP hold				

General Election 2001: Noakhali-2
Party	Candidate	Votes	%	±%
BNP	MA Hashem	158,737	62.2	+16.4
AL	A. B. M. Jafar Ullah	72,134	28.2	−1.1
IJOF	A. B. M. Haroonur Rashid Bashar	19,782	7.8	N/A
JSD	Mostafizur Rahman	2,266	0.9	N/A
BKA	A. T. M. Karim Hossain	825	0.3	+0.2
Independent	Lion Khurshid Alam Khasru	546	0.2	N/A
Independent	Jahir Ahammad	263	0.1	N/A
Jatiya Party (M)	Mir Mosharraf Hossain Miran	246	0.1	N/A
NAP (Bhashani)	A. K. M. Golam Kabir	233	0.1	−0.1
Bangladesh Progressive Party	Kazi Md. Rafiq Ullah	159	0.1	N/A
Bangladesh Samajtantrik Dal (Mahbub)	Shyamal Kanti Dey	134	0.1	N/A
Independent	A. S. M. Salim	77	0.0	N/A
Majority		86,603	33.9	+17.4
Turnout		255,402	60.3	−0.7
BNP hold				

=== Elections in the 1990s ===
General Election June 1996: Noakhali-2
Party	Candidate	Votes	%	±%
BNP	Barkat Ullah Bulu	84,307	45.8	+4.5
AL	M. A. Sattar Bhuiyan	53,987	29.3	+5.2
JP(E)	Morshed Alam	27,375	14.9	+7.8
Jamaat	Md. Nurullah	14,894	8.1	−5.9
IOJ	Mostofa Al Husaini	2,643	1.4	N/A
NAP (Bhashani)	A. K. M. Golam Kabir	339	0.2	−0.3
BKA	Md. Siddique Ullah	261	0.1	−2.0
Islamic Sashantantrik Andolan	A. K .M. Kefayetullah	249	0.1	N/A
Majority		30,320	16.5	−0.7
Turnout		184,055	61.0	+26.0
BNP hold				

General Election 1991: Noakhali-2
Party	Candidate	Votes	%	±%
BNP	Barkat Ullah Bulu	53,671	41.3	
AL	Md. Hanif	31,353	24.1	
Jamaat	Abul Kasem	18,248	14.0	
JP(E)	Golam Sarwar	9,254	7.1	
Jatiya Samajtantrik Dal-JSD	Mostafizur Rahman	6,896	5.3	
FP	Md. Faruk	3,014	2.3	
BKA	Md. Siddiq Ullah	2,695	2.1	
Bangladesh Janata Party	M. A. Bari	1,463	1.1	
Zaker Party	A. M. N. Anwar	867	0.7	
NAP (Bhashani)	A. K. M. Golam Kabir	682	0.5	
WPB	Abul Bashar	608	0.5	
Jatiya Samajtantrik Dal-JSD	Monir Uddin Khandakar	489	0.4	
Jatia Mukti Dal	Nur Md. Khan	343	0.3	
Bangladesh Samajtantrik Dal (Mahbub)	Hossain Ahmad Chowdhury	315	0.2	
BAKSAL	Md. Ajhar Ullah Bhuiyan	88	0.1	
Majority		22,318	17.2	
Turnout		129,986	35.0	
BNP gain from JP(E)				
