= Morshed Alam =

Bangladeshi politician (born 1950)

- মোরশেদ আলম

Member of Parliament
- In office 29 January 2014 – 6 August 2024
- Preceded by: Zainul Abdin Farroque
- Constituency: Noakhali-2

Personal details
- Born: 29 March 1950 (age 76) Noakhali, East Bengal, Dominion of Pakistan
- Party: Bangladesh Awami League

Morshed Alam (born 29 March 1950) is a Bangladeshi business magnate, politician, and a former Jatiya Sangsad member representing the Noakhali-2 constituency. Alam is the chairperson of the Bengal Group. Alam was the chairman of Mercantile Bank Limited. He is the chairperson of RTV and vice chairman of Desh General Insurance Company Limited. He is a director of United Hospital Limited and the National Life Insurance Company Limited. He is a trustee board member of the Peoples University of Bangladesh.

== Early life ==
Alam was born on 29 March 1950. He studied up to a Higher Secondary Certificate (HSC).

== Career ==
In 1969, Alam founded Bengal Group, one of Bangladesh's largest plastic and manufacturing groups today. He started with a single injection molding machine. In 1992, he received the contract to supply plastic crates for both Pepsi and Coca-Cola.

Alam's company, Bengal Plastic Industries Limited, was awarded Enterprise of the Year in 2007. Its turnover that year was 35$ million. In April 2010, he was elected chairman of Mercantile Bank Limited. He was elected vice-chairman of the bank the following year.

Alam was elected a member of parliament from Noakhali-2 in 2014 as a candidate of the Awami League unopposed in an election boycotted by all major political parties. He received a 36$ million investment from FMO (Netherlands) and the International Finance Corporation in the Bengal Group.

He was reelected to parliament in 2018 from Noakhali-2 as a candidate of the Awami League. He received 177,391 votes, while his nearest rival, Jainul Abedin Faruk of the Bangladesh Nationalist Party, received 26,169 votes. He was elected chairman of Mercantile Bank in 2019. He was one of the defendants in a lawsuit over the drama Indemnity, which allegedly portrayed Ziaur Rahman, former President of Bangladesh and founder of the Bangladesh Nationalist Party, negatively. The drama focused on the controversial Indemnity Act and aired on various platforms, sparking protests from Bangladesh Nationalist Party supporters. However, a Dhaka court dismissed the case against Morshed Alam and others, including Tarana Halim, President of Bangabandhu Sangskritik Jote and former minister, and actor Shaju Khadem. He made a donation to the Prime Minister's Relief Fund in 2020 along with chairmen of other commercial banks.

In 2021, Alam founded Bengal Commercial Bank led by his younger brother Jashim Uddin. He was re-elected to Parliament in the 2024 general elections as a candidate of the Awami League. He received 56,186 votes while his nearest rival, Ataur Rahman Bhuya Kanchi, received 52,863 votes.

After the fall of the Sheikh Hasina led Awami League government, Alam's factory, Bengal Plastic at Zirani, was burned down along with several businesses owned by Awami League supporters. He was detained by the Detective Branch led by Rezaul Karim Mallick in April 2025. He was sent to jail in a case over the death of Shamim, a school student, in protests against Prime Minister Sheikh Hasina in July 2024.
