= Kazirbag Eco-Park =

- কাজীরবাগ ইকো-পার্ক
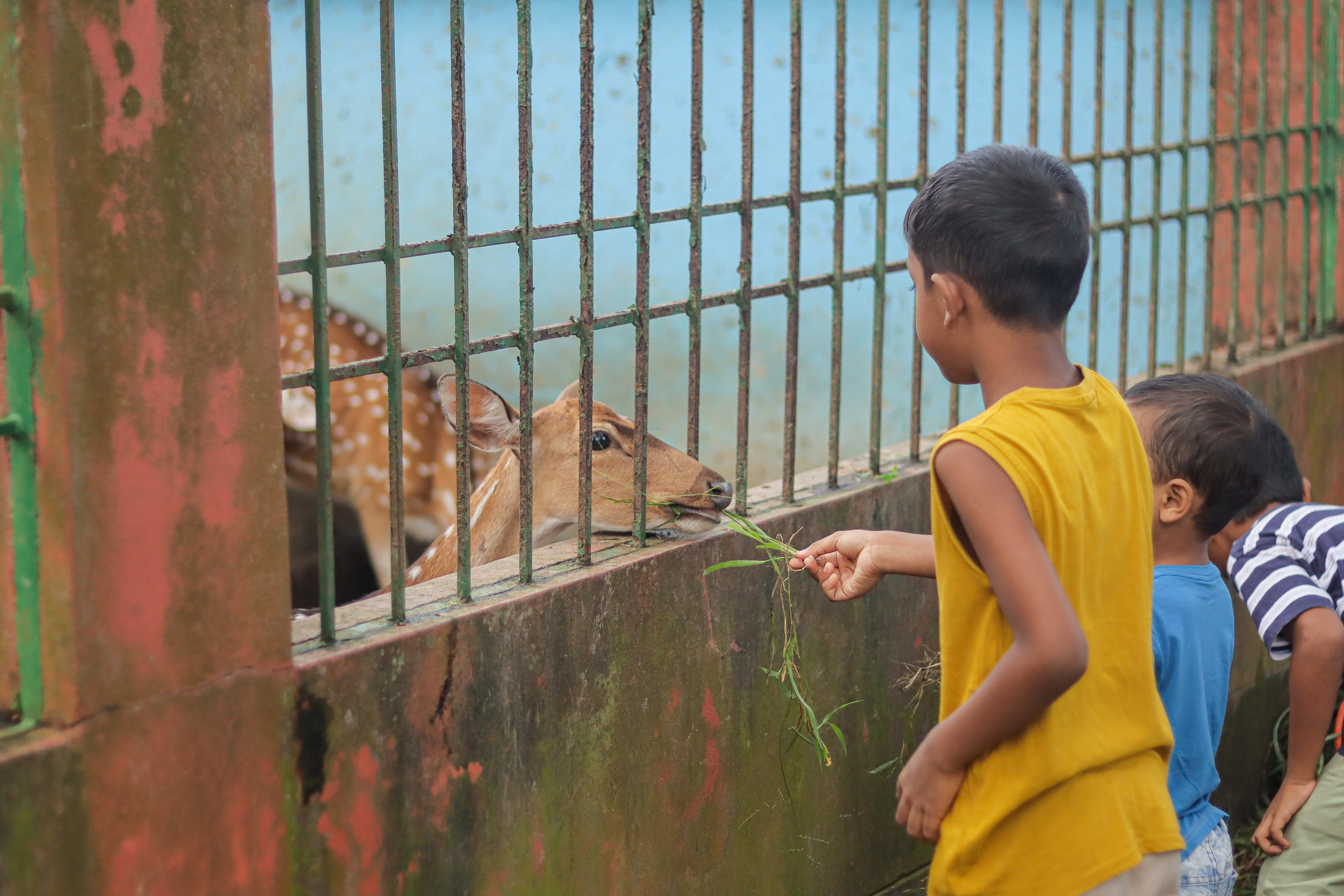
- The landscaped park has deer and other animals in enclosures.

- Location within Bangladesh
- Type: Eco-park
- Location: Feni-Parshuram Road, Kazirbag
- Nearest town: Feni
- Coordinates: 23.0420°N 91.4216°E
- Area: 4.75 acres (1.92 ha)
- Opened: December 2015
- Owner: Ministry of Environment, Forest and Climate Change

Kazirbag Eco-Park is an eco-park and recreation center located at Kazirbag, about 5 kilometres (3.1 mi) northeast of Feni, Bangladesh.

== History ==
It occupies 4.75 acres (1.92 ha) of land. During 2015, it became available to the public.
