= Mahbub Uddin Khokon =

Bangladeshi politician

- মাহবুব উদ্দিন খোকন
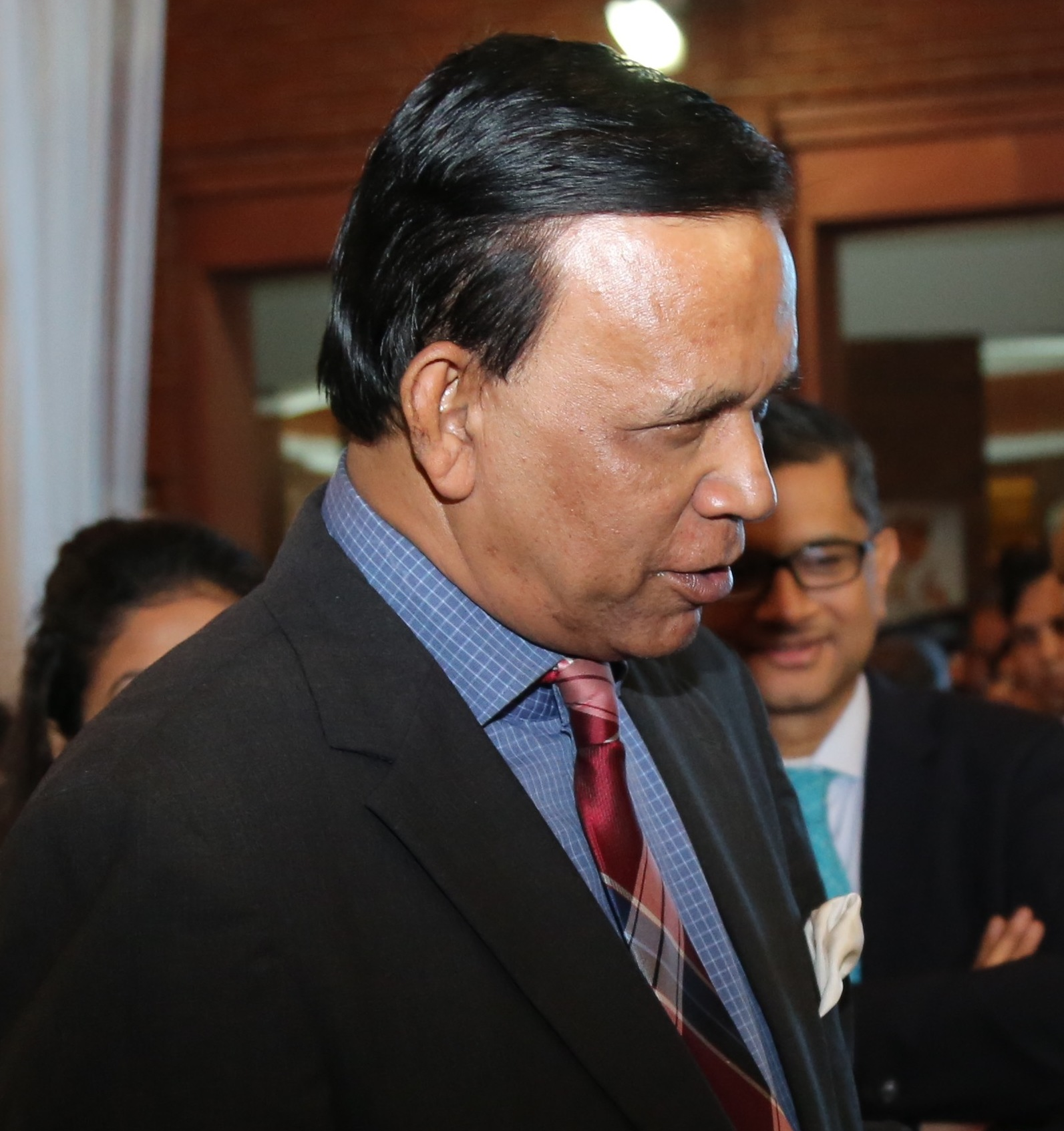
- Khokon in 2017

President of Bangladesh Supreme Court Bar Association
- Incumbent
- Assumed office 1 April 2024
- Preceded by: Momtazuddin Fakir

Member of Parliament for Noakhali-1
- Incumbent
- Assumed office 17 February 2026
- Preceded by: Zainul Abdin Farroque
- In office 25 January 2009 – 24 January 2014
- Preceded by: H. M. Ibrahim
- Succeeded by: H. M. Ibrahim

Personal details
- Born: A.M. Mahbub Uddin Khokon; 12 January 1956 (age 70) Noakhali District, East Pakistan
- Party: Bangladesh Nationalist Party
- Website: mahbub.aboutbio.info

A.M. Mahbub Uddin Khokon (born 12 January 1956) is a Bangladesh Nationalist Party politician, lawyer and current member of parliament from the Noakhali-1 constituency.

== Early life ==
Khokon was born in Sonapur, in the district of Noakhali's Sonaimuri Upazila. Mamtaz Uddin Ahmed was his father, and Begum Raushan Ara was his mother. Of his nine siblings, he is the oldest. Khokon obtained SSC from Gopalpur High School in Noakhali. HSC from Dhaka Government College and Dhaka University with an LLB. In Wales, UK, he earned an LLB (Hons) degree in 1992. In 1993, he graduated as a Barrister at Law from the Lincoln's Inn. Since 1994, he has worked in the legal field.

== Career ==
Mahbub Uddin Khokon was elected to parliament from Noakhali-1 as a Bangladesh Nationalist Party candidate in 2008. He is also the party chief Khaleda Zia's lawyer. He is the founder and leader of the law firm 'Mahbub & Company' based in Dhaka. On 15 December 2018, he was wounded by six bullets fired by the Sonaimuri Upazila police under Bangladesh Awami League government during his election campaign for the upcoming general election. In March 2024, he was elected as the president of Bangladesh Supreme Court Bar Association.

== Personal life ==
Kokhon and his wife have one daughter and one son. Their son is also a barrister.
