= Biplob Kumar Sarker =

Bangladeshi police officer

- বিপ্লব কুমার সরকার
- Born: June 16, 1972 (age 54); Kishoreganj District, Bangladesh
- Education: University of Dhaka
- Occupation: Police officer
- Awards: BPM (bar)(revoked); PPM (bsa)(revoked)
- Police career
- Allegiance: Bangladesh
- Branch: Bangladesh Police
- Status: Dismissed
- Rank: Additional DIG

Biplob Kumar Sarker (Bengali: বিপ্লব কুমার সরকার; born 16 June 1972) is a former Bangladeshi police officer who served as the joint commissioner of the Dhaka Metropolitan Police. Earlier he served as additional deputy inspector general of the Bangladesh Police Dhaka Range.

== Early life ==
Sarker was born on 16 June 1972 in Kharampatti of Kishoreganj Sadar Upazila and graduated from the University of Dhaka.

== Career ==
Sarker assaulted Zainul Abedin Farroque, chief opposition whip of the parliament and politician of the Bangladesh Nationalist Party, on 6 July 2011 at a hartal of the party. Farroque sued him on 19 August 2024.

On 6 April 2013, Sarker became the deputy commissioner of the Tejgaon Zone. He served as the general secretary of the Bangladesh Police Service Association. On 13 June 2019, he was promoted to superintendent of police of Rangpur District. On 18 October 2021, he was reappointed as the deputy commissioner of the Dhaka Metropolitan Police.

On 2 June 2022, Sarker was appointed as the additional deputy inspector general (additional DIG) of Bangladesh Police Dhaka Range. He was the joint commissioner of the Dhaka Metropolitan Police.

== Controversies ==
On 13 August 2024, Sarker was named as one of the 7 accused in the illegal shooting and killing of various students across Dhaka during the Bangladesh Quota Reform Movement, along with former prime minister Sheikh Hasina, former minister Obaidul Quader, former minister Asaduzzaman Khan, and DB police officer Harun-or-Rashid.

His house was attacked after the fall of the Sheikh Hasina government, as he was close with the Hasina regime.

After the fall of the Hasina government, Biplob Kumar went missing. He didn't rejoin the police services. Sources claim that he fled to India by Lalmonirhat District border area.

In July 2026, the International Crimes Tribunal accepted charges of genocide and crimes against humanity against Sarker for his involvement in a crackdown on the 2013 Shapla Square protests. The operation allegedly killed 58 unarmed Hefazat-e-Islam Bangladesh activists.

In August 2026, Sarkar was dismissed from the Bangladesh Police for being absent from duty for over 60 days without permission.
