= Feni, Bangladesh =

City in Bangladesh

Feni ফেনী শহর
- Municipality
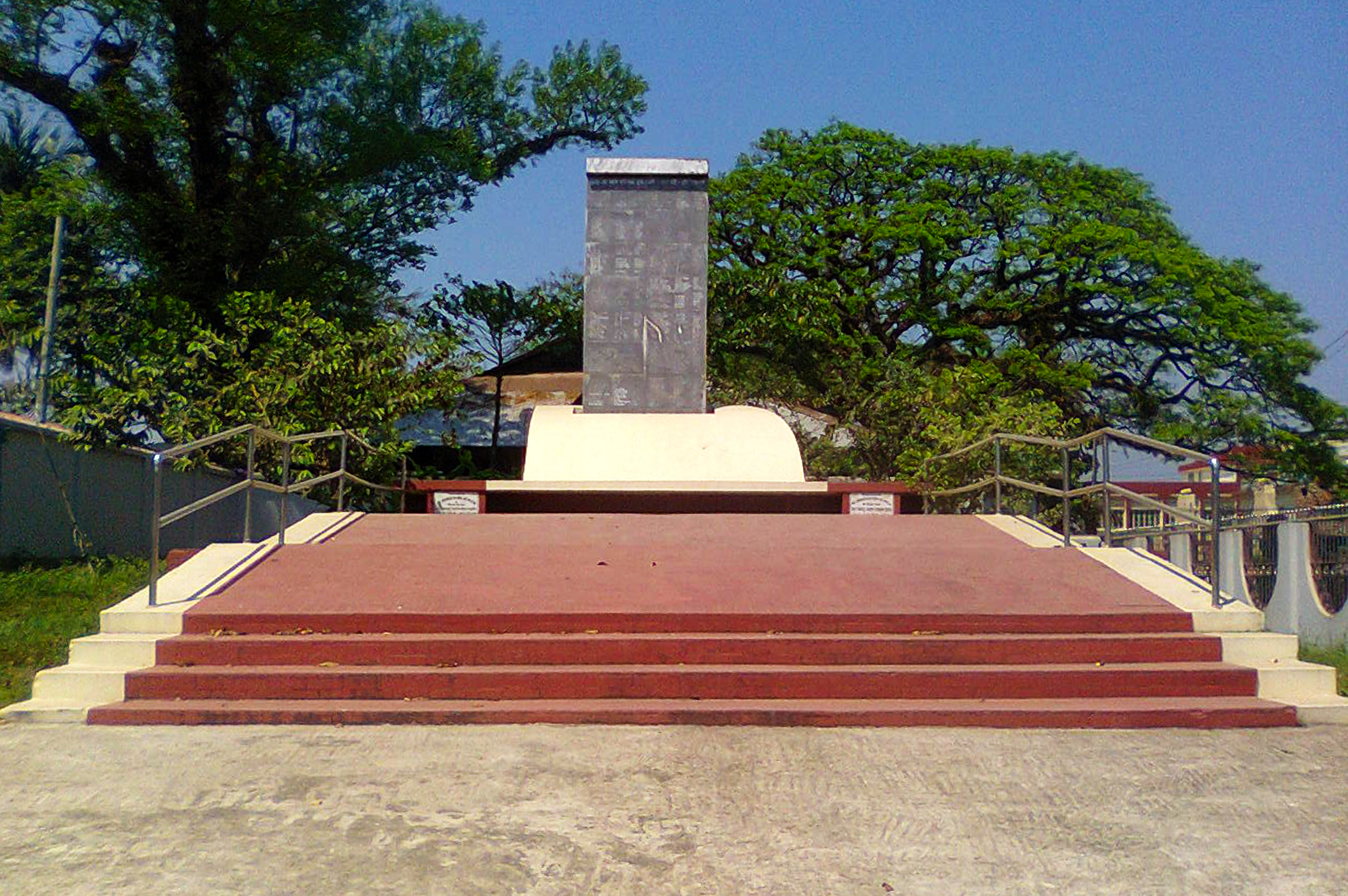
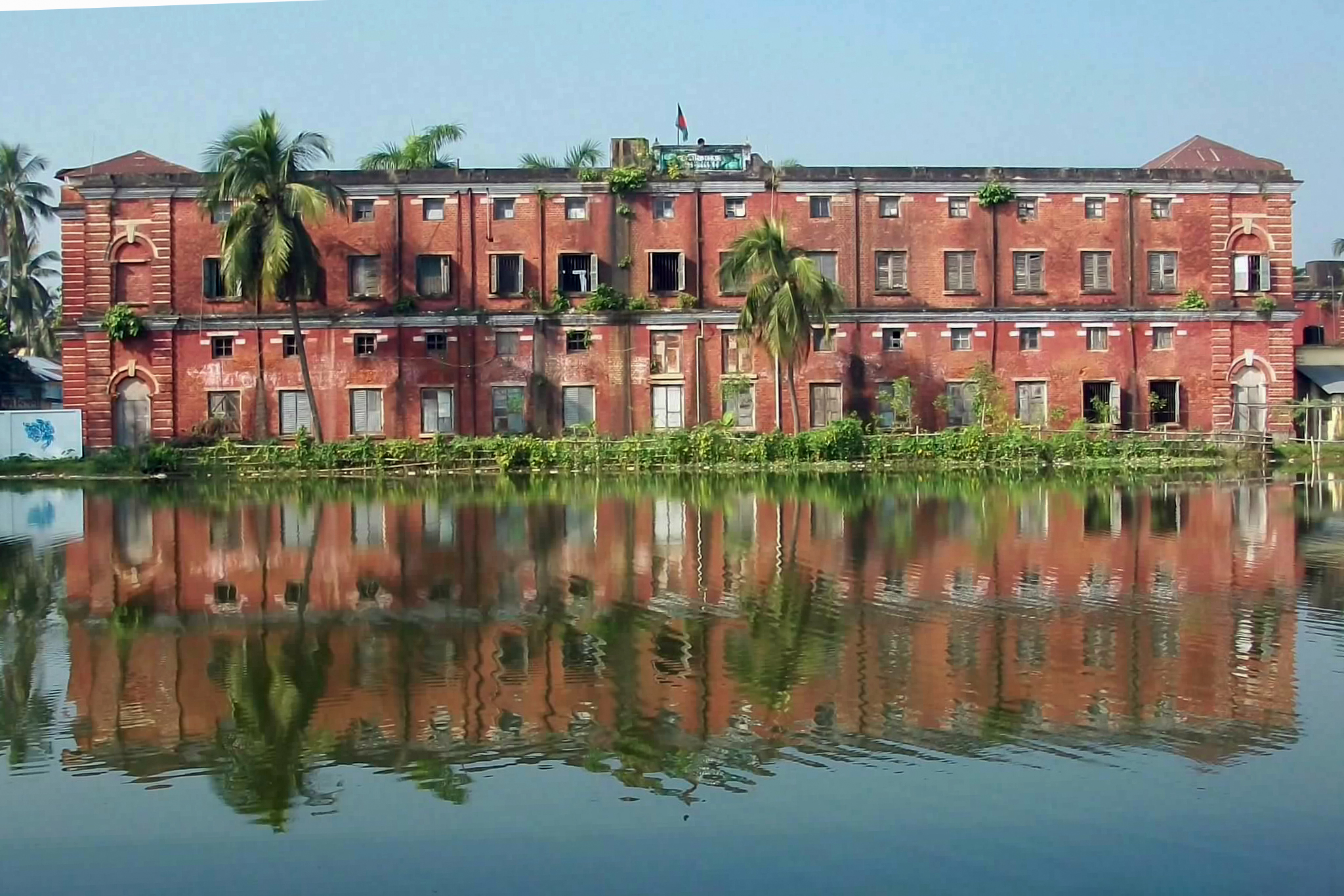
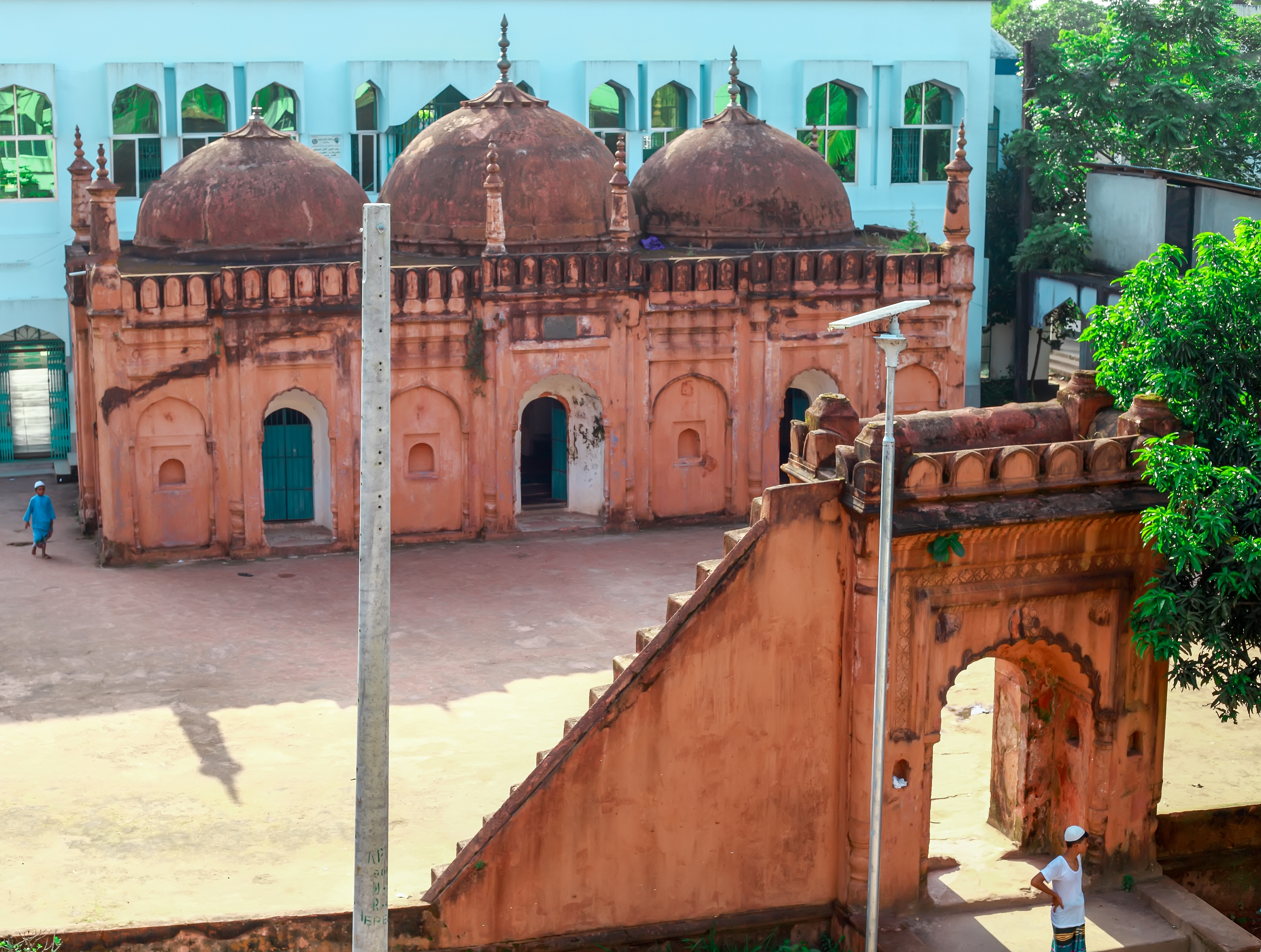
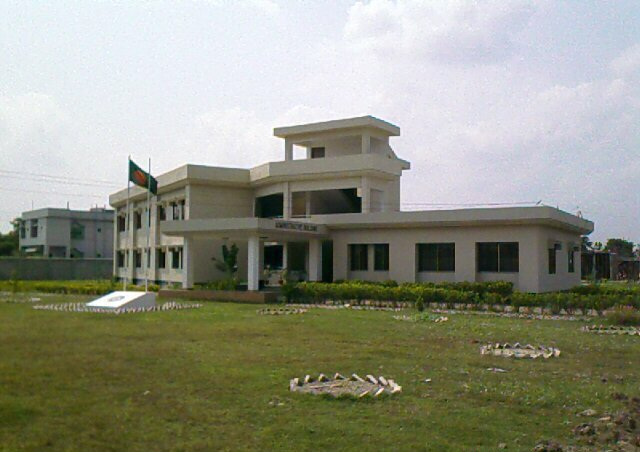
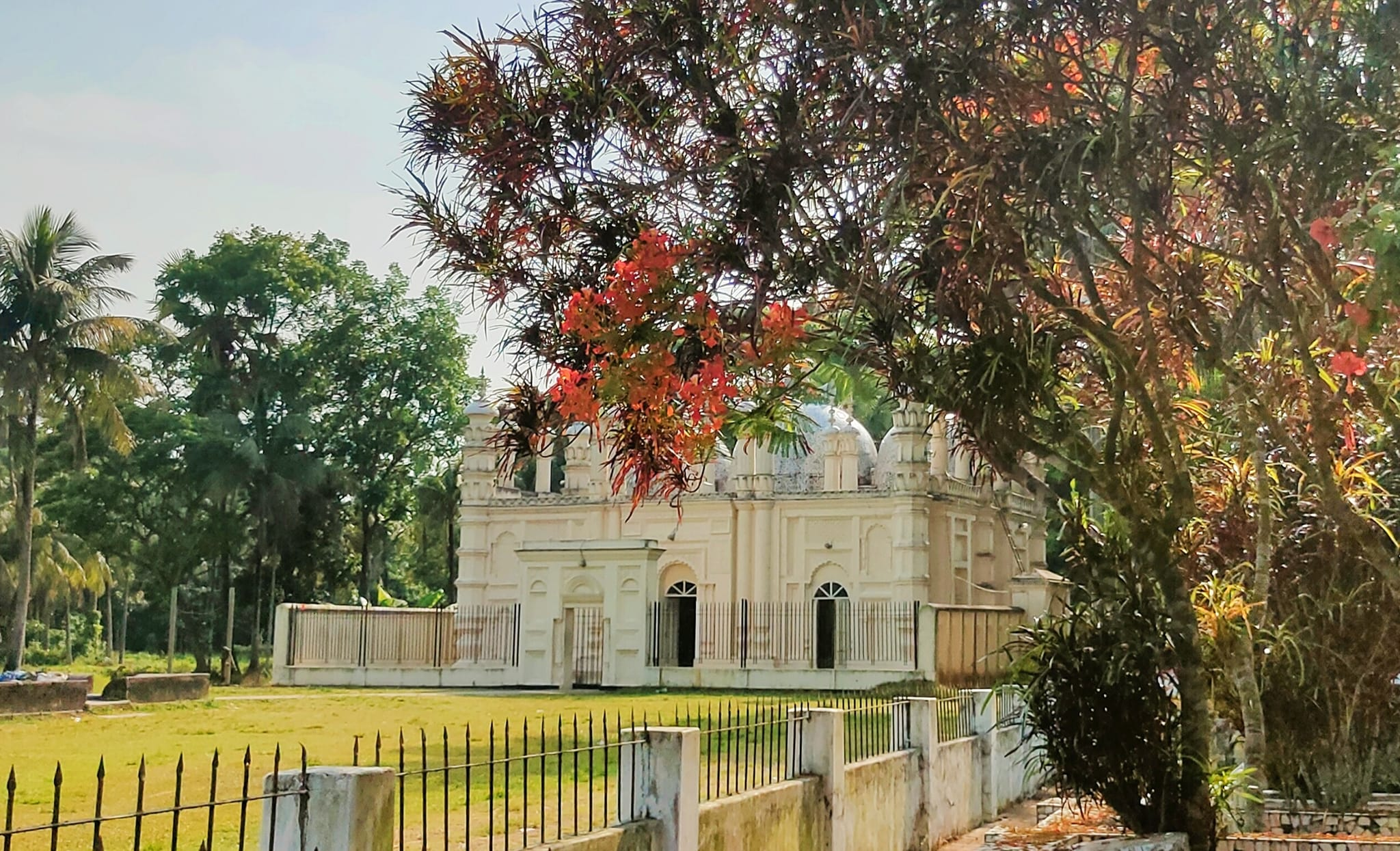
- clockwise: Monument of freedom fighter in Feni city, Administrative Building of Feni Government College, Mohammad Ali Chowdhury mosque, Feni Girls' Cadet College, Ramnagar Chowdhury Bari Jame Masjid

- Location in Bangladesh Feni (Bangladesh)
- Coordinates: 23.015°N 91.4°E
- Country: Bangladesh
- Division: Chittagong Division
- District: Feni District
- Upazila: Feni Sadar Upazila
- Incorporated as a city: 1958

Government
  - Type: Mayor–council government
  - Body: Feni Municipality
  - Mayor: None

Area
  - Total: 27.20 km^{2} (10.50 sq mi)

Population (2022)
  - Total: 234,350
  - Density: 8,616/km^{2} (22,310/sq mi)
- Time zone: UTC+6 (Bangladesh Time)
- Postal code: 3900
- National Dialing Code: +880
- Local Dialing Code: +88-0331

Feni (Bengali: ফেনী) is a city in the Chittagong Division of south-eastern Bangladesh, located in Feni District. It hosts the administrative headquarters of Feni District and Feni Sadar Upazila. At the 2022 Bangladeshi census, the city had a population of 234,350, making it the most populated city in the district and the 18th largest city in Bangladesh. Established in 1958, Feni is the oldest municipality in this region.

== Administration ==
The municipality consists of 18 wards and 35 mahallas. Nazrul Islam Shwapon Miaji assumed the office of the mayor in February 2021.

== Geography ==
Feni is located at 23.0186°N 91.3966°E in the southeastern region of Bangladesh. The municipality is bounded by Dharmapur Union on the north, Sarishadi Union in the north-west, Panchgachia Union in the west, Baligaon Union in the south, Kalidah Union and Kazipara Union in the east.

=== Climate ===
Climate data for Feni (1991–2020, extremes 1973-present)
Month	Jan	Feb	Mar	Apr	May	Jun	Jul	Aug	Sep	Oct	Nov	Dec	Year
Record high °C (°F)	32.0 (89.6)	37.0 (98.6)	37.1 (98.8)	39.4 (102.9)	38.8 (101.8)	36.5 (97.7)	36.6 (97.9)	37.0 (98.6)	37.0 (98.6)	36.5 (97.7)	35.0 (95.0)	32.2 (90.0)	39.4 (102.9)
Mean daily maximum °C (°F)	25.6 (78.1)	28.5 (83.3)	31.6 (88.9)	32.7 (90.9)	32.6 (90.7)	31.6 (88.9)	31.0 (87.8)	31.4 (88.5)	31.8 (89.2)	31.6 (88.9)	29.9 (85.8)	26.8 (80.2)	30.4 (86.7)
Daily mean °C (°F)	18.1 (64.6)	21.5 (70.7)	25.4 (77.7)	27.6 (81.7)	28.2 (82.8)	28.2 (82.8)	27.9 (82.2)	28.1 (82.6)	28.1 (82.6)	27.1 (80.8)	23.7 (74.7)	19.6 (67.3)	25.3 (77.5)
Mean daily minimum °C (°F)	12.6 (54.7)	15.8 (60.4)	20.4 (68.7)	23.4 (74.1)	24.5 (76.1)	25.4 (77.7)	25.4 (77.7)	25.4 (77.7)	25.2 (77.4)	23.7 (74.7)	19.0 (66.2)	14.5 (58.1)	21.3 (70.3)
Record low °C (°F)	6.1 (43.0)	9.4 (48.9)	12.8 (55.0)	15.6 (60.1)	19.2 (66.6)	21.1 (70.0)	21.7 (71.1)	21.7 (71.1)	21.6 (70.9)	18.0 (64.4)	13.0 (55.4)	7.8 (46.0)	6.1 (43.0)
Average precipitation mm (inches)	6 (0.2)	25 (1.0)	62 (2.4)	143 (5.6)	351 (13.8)	549 (21.6)	662 (26.1)	515 (20.3)	367 (14.4)	229 (9.0)	42 (1.7)	8 (0.3)	2,959 (116.5)
Average precipitation days (≥ 1 mm)	1	2	3	7	15	19	23	22	17	9	2	1	121
Average relative humidity (%)	76	73	74	79	81	85	87	86	86	84	80	78	81
Mean monthly sunshine hours	206.6	221.2	235.7	221.4	209.0	160.8	152.8	165.6	171.2	216.7	234.8	216.1	2,411.9
Source 1: NOAA
Source 2: Bangladesh Meteorological Department (humidity 1981-2010)

== Demographics ==
Religions in Feni Paurashava (2022)
Religion	Percent
Islam	91.81%
Hinduism	8.03%
Other or not stated	0.16%

According to the 2022 Bangladesh census, Feni Paurashava had 55,253 households and a population of 234,357. Feni had a literacy rate of 86.78%: 86.82% for males and 86.73% for females, and a sex ratio of 102.88 males per 100 females. 8.84% of the population was under 5 years of age.

According to the 2011 Bangladesh census, Feni city had 31,468 households and a population of 156,971. 34,961 (22.27%) were under 10 years of age. Feni had a literacy rate (age 7 and over) of 69.67%, compared to the national average of 51.8%, and a sex ratio of 901 females per 1000 males.

== Notable people ==
- Khawaja Ahmed, leader of Bengali language movement in Feni, later member of the 1st Bangladeshi parliament.
- Hamidul Huq Chowdhury, Former Minister of Foreign Affairs of Pakistan.
- Selina Parvin, an intellectual martyr in the Bangladesh Liberation War, had her ancestral home in Feni. In her honour, Nazir Road was renamed Shaheed Selina Parvin Road.
- Zahir Raihan*

== City View ==
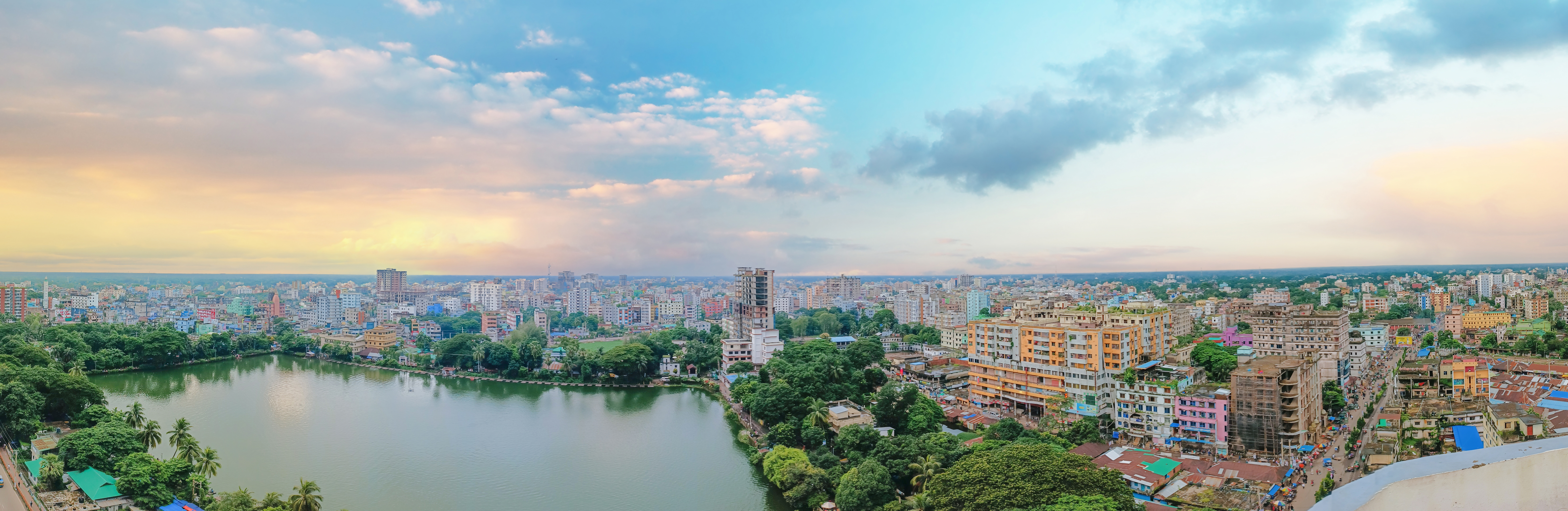
High-resolution panorama of Feni city, taken from Feni garden city, on August 2025.

== See also ==
- List of cities and towns in Bangladesh
- Upazilas of Bangladesh
- Districts of Bangladesh
- Divisions of Bangladesh
- Upazila
- Thana
