= Khawaja Ahmed =

Bangladeshi politician

- খাজা আহমেদ

Member of the 1st Jatiya Sangsad
- In office 1973–1979
- Succeeded by: Rafiquzzaman Bhuiyan
- Constituency: Noakhali-2

Member of the Constituent Assembly of Bangladesh
- In office 1971 – 6 November 1973

Personal details
- Born: 1920 Feni, Noakhali District, Bengal Presidency
- Died: 29 May 1976 (aged 55–56) Dhaka Medical College Hospital, Bangladesh
- Political party: Muslim League (1940–1952); Ganatantri Dal (1952–1963); Awami League (1963–1976)

Khawaja Ahmed (Bengali: খাজা আহমেদ) was a Bangladeshi politician and journalist. He participated in the Bangladesh Liberation War and served in the 1st National Parliament of Bangladesh.

== Early life and education ==
Ahmed was born in 1920, to a Bengali Muslim family in the Saudagar Bari of Rampur, Feni, located under the Noakhali District of the Bengal Presidency. His parents were Aslam Mia Mukhtar and Aisha Khatun. While only ten years old, he joined the Congress's independence movement. On 26 January 1930, he was assaulted by the police and fell down on the street. He studied at the Feni High School. In 1934, he was elected as a member of the Noakhali District Farmer Society's executive committee. He became entirely dedicated to social work with the establishment of the Khademul Islam Bayam Samiti in 1936. At sixteen years old, he participated in the Khaksar movement from Feni. He later moved to the Bashpara Quarter of Feni.

== Career ==
Ahmed joined the All-India Muslim League, which advocated for the Pakistan Movement, and was elected as the secretary-general of its Feni branch in 1940. In 1941, he was home arrested first in his village and later in his own home for organising protests against the Huq-Syama coalition. Ahmed was arrested under the Indian Protection Act in 1942 and released in 1944. In 1946, the Weekly Sangram magazine was published from Feni under his editorship. In the same year, Ahmed was elected as a member of the Barahipur Union Council.

Despite advocating for the Pakistan Movement, Ahmed later became involved in secular politics. The East Pakistan Youth League was formed in 1950, with Ahmed as its inaugural vice-president. Two years later, Ahmed joined East Pakistan's first secular political party, the Ganatantri Dal, becoming a member of its executive council. The party joined the United Front coalition during the 1954 East Bengal Legislative Assembly election, and Ahmed was elected to the East Bengal Legislative Assembly. The Arms Act and Language Movement in 1948-1949, and the Fundamental Rights Movement in 1950, the National Language Movement in 1952, Section (a) of 1954, Martial Law in 1960, and the Military Tribunal in 1961 imprisoned Ahmad. He became a member of the Noakhali District School Board in 1952 and 1957. In 1962, a mass movement started in Feni demanding the cancellation of the infamous Education Commission report, and Ahmed was again imprisoned under the Pakistan Security Act. In 1963, Ahmed joined the Awami League and became the first secretary-general of the Feni Subdivisional Awami League. From 1964 to 1973, Ahmed was the president of the Feni Subdivisional Awami League. In 1968, he was re-imprisoned for the murdering a government employee that had molested a young girl. In 1946, he was elected as a member of the Barahipur Union Council.

During the 1970 Pakistani general election campaign, Ahmed contested and successfully won in the NE-146 (Noakhali-II) constituency. However, the assembly was not formed and later led to the Bangladesh Liberation War. On 26 March, the first direct encounter started in Feni by the Bengali freedom fighters formed under Ahmed's leadership against the 1400 Punjab Regiment stationed in Feni. On the same day, he established contact with the Sachindra Lal Singh, the Chief Minister of Tripura, on behalf of the pro-liberation Bengalis. Under his able leadership, Feni was first liberated on 6 December 1971. Among his roles was being a member of the Eastern Liberation Front and chairman of the Regional Liberation Front's Economy Committee.

The first set of elections in Bangladesh were held in 1973, and Ahmed was re-elected as an Awami League candidate from Noakhali-2. On 17 July 1975, he was appointed as the Governor of Feni Subdivision under the BAKSAL regime. He was the founding president of the Dilpur Khawaja Ahmed High School and the Rampur Girls' High School. Ahmed was also the president of Feni Government Girls High School, Assistant Pilot High School, He was a chairman of the Feni College governing board.

== Death ==
Ahmed died on 29 May 1976 at the Dhaka Medical College Hospital.
