= Fatema Tuzzahura =

Bangladeshi politician

Member of Parliament
- In office 2013–2018

Personal details
- Political party: Bangladesh Awami League

Fatema Tuzzahura (Bengali: ফাতেমা তুজ্জহুরা) is a Bangladesh Awami League politician and the incumbent member of parliament from Reserved women's seat-21.

== Career ==
Tuzzahura was elected to parliament on 5 January 2014 from a reserved women's seat-21 as a Bangladesh Awami League candidate. Her husband is Anisur Rahman, superintendent of police of Narayanganj District.

Bangladesh Financial Intelligence Unit sought information on the banks accounts of Tuzzahura and her husband, Anisur Rahman in October 2019.
