= M. A. Hashem =

Bangladeshi politician (1943–2020)

- এম এ হাসেম

Member of Parliament for Noakhali-2
- In office 1 October 2001 – 28 October 2006
- Preceded by: Barkat Ullah Bulu
- Succeeded by: Zainul Abdin Farroque

Personal details
- Born: 30 August 1943 Noakhali, Bengal Presidency, British India
- Died: 24 December 2020 (aged 77) Dhaka, Bangladesh
- Cause of death: COVID-19
- Party: Bangladesh Nationalist Party
- Spouse: Sultana Hashem
- Occupation: Businessman, politician

M. A. Hashem (30 August 1943 – 24 December 2020) was a Bangladeshi businessman and the founding chairman of Partex Group. He served as member of parliament from the Bangladesh Nationalist Party.

== Early life ==
M. A. Hashem was born on 30 August 1943 in Sonaimuri of Noakhali.

== Career ==
In 1959, Hashem began his career by trading tobacco. He went on to establish Partex Group, one of the largest companies in Bangladesh, consisting of over 70 factories and employing over 50,000 people. Partex's companies are market leaders in nearly all sectors of industry in Bangladesh. He expanded his business into food & beverages, steel, real estate, furniture, plastics, paper, power and energy, jute, agribusiness, shipyards, shipping, cotton, textile, construction, IT, cables, aviation, PVC, ceramics, telecommunication, logistics, fisheries, etc.

Hashem was elected to parliament in 2001 from Noakhali-2 as a Bangladesh Nationalist Party candidate. He was arrested by the caretaker government in 2007 during the 2006–08 Bangladesh political crises along with most of the wealthiest people in the country at the time. He left the Bangladesh Nationalist Party in 2008 after the military-baked caretaker government regime in Bangladesh had ended and steadfastly denied his involvement in a business syndicate that manipulated commodity prices. He also said former prime minister Khaleda Zia had pressured him to join the Bangladesh Nationalist Party.

In January 1992, United Commercial Bank provided a 200 million taka loan to Russel Vegetable Oils Limited, an edible oil refiner. At that time, his wife, Sultana Hashem, and two brothers were directors of United Commercial Bank. Another loan was approved in November 1992 by the bank for the refinery for 4.5 million taka. The loan was rescheduled 4 times until 2000. The bank then sued the company to get its money back. In 2008, when Hashem and his son, Showkat Aziz Russell, were directors of United Commercial Bank; the bank agreed to settle the case for a payment of 50 million taka. Hashem is a founding member of United Commercial Bank and has served as the chairman for five years. He is also a founding member of The City Bank and has served as the chairperson for five years.

On 8 April 2011, A Dhaka court framed charges against Hashem and eight members of his family and employees on a tax evasion case. The case was filed by National Board of Revenue, which accused them of dodging 5.97 billion taka in taxes from 2006 to 2008. Hashem and the other accused pleaded not guilty and demanded justice before the court. The two-year period that Hashem was accused of evading tax (2006–08) is also the same two-year period of the 2006–08 Bangladesh political crises.

In 2020, the International Finance Corporation or IFC of the World Bank Group published a report on the private sector in Bangladesh featuring 23 of Bangladesh's top companies based on revenue, Hashem's conglomerate Partex Group was on that list.

Hashem joined the board of trustees of IBAIS University in 2013. He is a founding member of North South University and also sits on the trustee board. In 2019, he became the chairperson of the board of the university.

Having come from a modest background himself, Hashem has set up numerous charitable organisations and is widely acknowledged for his philanthropic work. He has schools, hospitals, and other non-profit organisations in Noakhali.

== Personal life ==
Hashem was married to Sultana Hashem. They had five sons — Aziz Al Kaiser, Aziz Al Mahmood, Aziz Al Masud, Rubel Aziz and Showkat Aziz Russell.

=== Death ===
Hashem died from COVID-19 on 24 December 2020, at the Evercare Hospital in Dhaka. He was 77 years old.
