= City Bank (Bangladesh) =

Bangladeshi bank

City Bank PLC
- Native name: সিটি ব্যাংক পিএলসি
- Formerly: The City Bank PLC.
- Company type: Public Limited Company
- Traded as: DSE: CITYBANK
- ISIN: BD0102CTBNK5
- Industry: Banking, financial services
- Founded: 28 March 1983; 43 years ago
- Founder: Monowar Ali, Ibrahim Mia (Late), Abdul Hadi (Late), M.A. Hashem (Late), Anwar Hossain, Abdul Barik Choudhury (Late), Deen Mohammad, A.B.M. Feroz, Md. Ali Hossain, Azizul Haque Chowdhury, N.A. Chowdhury (Late)
- Headquarters: City Bank Center, 28, Gulshan Avenue, Gulshan 1, 1212, Dhaka, Bangladesh
- Number of locations: 164 (2025)
- Area served: Bangladesh
- Key people: Aziz Al Kaiser (Chairman) Mashrur Arefin (CEO)
- Products: Retail banking, corporate banking, investment banking, mortgage loans, private banking, wealth management, credit cards, finance and insurance
- Revenue: ▲24.58 billions (2022)
- Operating income: ▲11.82 billions (2022)
- Net income: ▲45.07 billions (2022)
- Total assets: ▲506.84 billions (2022)
- Number of employees: 4,866 (2022)
- Website: citybankplc.com

City Bank PLC is a Bangladeshi private commercial bank headquartered in Dhaka. The bank provides products and services in retail banking, corporate finance, SME finance, digital banking, asset management, equity brokerage, and securities. It has 134 branches and 47 sub branches. The bank is a licensee to issue Visa and MasterCard Debit and Credit Cards and it is the sole licensee of American Express Cards in Bangladesh.

The bank is a real-time online bank, having its branches, SME/Agri branches spread across Bangladesh along with a full-fledged Islami Banking branch. The managing director and CEO of the bank is Mashrur Arefin. City Bank has gone international establishing 10 branches and 1 representative office in Malaysia in 2013 and one subsidiary office in Hong Kong in 2019. International Finance Corporation solely has invested BDT 1.31 billion, attaining a 5% share of City Bank.

== History ==
It is a first-generation private commercial bank and it is one of the oldest commercial banks in the country. Then known as "The City Bank Limited", its operations were started on 28 March 1983 by 12 local businessmen of the country. Those directors commenced the journey with only BDT 34 million worth of Capital, which now is a respectable BDT 3.3 billion as capital & reserve. Deen Mohammad, chairman of Phoenix Group, was the founder of City Bank.

City Bank PLC opened its first branch in the B. B. Avenue Branch in Dhaka. In 1986, City Bank PLC was listed on the Dhaka Stock Exchange and in 1995, it was listed on Chittagong Stock Exchange.

On its 25th anniversary in 2008, City Bank PLC revamped its image and services. This includes the launch of a new logo, American Express credit cards, a brokerage business, and City Wallet (SMS Banking) services. The name of the bank was simplified to "City Bank PLC" from its earlier "The City Bank Limited". The new logo, depicting a red and white checkered box kite, was launched in July 2008.

Sohail RK Hussain was appointed managing director of City Bank in November 2013.

The International Finance Corporation purchased a five percent stake in City Bank for 1.31 billion BDT in February 2016. In December 2017, City Bank raised US$26 million for Doreen Power, a subsidiary of Doreen Group, to construct a powerplant in Munshiganj District.

City Bank became the third bank in Bangladesh to offer UnionPay debit cards in August 2020.

In July 2021, CDC Group provided a US$30 million loan to City Bank.

Since the new offshore banking law was passed in March 2024, City Bank has managed to build offshore deposits of nearly US$21 million within two months. It is the first bank in Bangladesh to receive foreign currency deposits through its Offshore Banking products.

== Board of directors ==
Name	Position	Reference
Aziz Al Kaiser	Chairman	
Hossain Khaled	Vice-chairman	
Rubel Aziz	Director	
Hossain Mehmood	Director	
Rajibul Huq Chowdhury	Director	
Syeda Shaireen Aziz	Director	
Savera H Mahmood	Director	
Salim Mahmud	Independent director	
Rebecca Bronson	IFC Nominated Director	
Matiul Islam Nowshad	Independent director	
Mashrur Arefin	CEO and managing director	

== Awards ==
The following awards were received by the bank:

2023

ITFC Trade Finance Deal of the Year Award 2023

- Best Bank in Bangladesh – Global Finance Best Bank Awards 2023
- Best Premium Banking Services in Bangladesh – Asiamoney Best Bank Awards
- SDG Brand Champion in Climate & Environment – SDG Brand Champion Award 2023
- Best Innovation in Bank (City Remit) – Bangladesh Innovation Award 2023

2022

- Best Bank in Bangladesh – FinanceAsia Country Awards 2022
- Best Bank in Bangladesh – Global Finance Best Bank Awards 2022
- Best Sustainable Finance Bank in Bangladesh – Global Finance’s Sustainable Finance Country Awards 2022
- Best Retail Bank – Bangladesh – Retail Banker Asia Trailblazer Awards 2022
- Best New Islamic Banking Window - Bangladesh – Global Brands Banking & Finance Awards 2022
- Best Islamic SME Bank in Bangladesh – The Asset Triple A Islamic Finance Awards 2022
- Best CSR Bank in Bangladesh – Asiamoney Best Bank Awards 2022
- Leading Partner Bank in Bangladesh – Trade and Supply Chain Finance Program (TSCFP) Awards 2022 by Asian Development Bank (ADB)
- Honorable Mention for ‘Product Innovation of the Year’ – Global SME Finance Awards 2022
- Honorable Mention for 'SME Financier of the Year – Asia' – Global SME Finance Awards 2022
- ICMAB Best Corporate Award ' – ICMA Bangladesh

2021

- Best Bank in Bangladesh – Global Finance World's Best Banks
- Best Bank in Bangladesh – FinanceAsia Country Awards
- Best Digital Bank in Bangladesh – Asiamoney Best Bank Awards
- Best Consumer Digital Bank in Bangladesh – Global Finance World’s Best Digital Bank Award
- Best Innovation in Banks for Digital Loan – Bangladesh Innovation Award
- Best CSR Bank in Bangladesh – Asia Money Best Bank Awards
- Leading Partner Bank in Bangladesh – Asian Development Bank (ADB) under Trade and Supply Chain Finance Program (TSCFP)
- Best Retailer Banks – Bangladesh Retail Awards 2021

2020

- Leading Partner Bank in Bangladesh – Asian Development Bank (ADB) under Trade and Supply Chain Finance Program (TSCFP)
- Best CSR Bank in Bangladesh – Asiamoney Best Bank Awards

2019

- Best Women Program Launch Award – Financial Alliance for Women
- Best Premium Banking Services in Bangladesh – Asiamoney Best Bank Awards 2019
- Best Bank in Bangladesh – Global Finance Best Emerging Markets Bank 2019
- Syndicated Loan of the Year Bangladesh – 2019 Asian Banking & Finance

2018

- Best Bank in Bangladesh – 2018 FinanceAsia Country Awards for Achievement
- Best Investment Bank in Bangladesh – 2018 FinanceAsia Country Awards for Achievement
- Best Consumer Digital Bank in Bangladesh 2018 – Global Finance
- Best Bank for Premium Services 2018 by Asiamoney
