= Mostafizur Rahman (Noakhali politician) =

Bangladeshi politician

Member of Bangladesh Parliament
- In office 1986–1990

Personal details
- Died: 3 November 2013 Dhaka
- Party: Jatiya Samajtantrik Dal

Mostafizur Rahman is a Jatiya Samajtantrik Dal politician and a former member of parliament for Noakhali-2.

== Career ==
Rahman was elected to parliament from Noakhali-2 as a Jatiya Samajtantrik Dal candidate in 1986 and 1988.

== Death ==
Mostafizur Rahman died on 3 November 2013.
