= A. B. M. Taleb Ali =

Bangladeshi politician (died 2019)

A B M Taleb AlI
- এ বি মোহম্মদ তালেব আলী

Personal details
- Died: 7 May 2019 (aged 92) Sonagazi Feni District, Bangladesh
- Party: Awami League
- Occupation: Politician, academic

A B M Taleb Ali (died 7 May 2019) was a Bangladesh Awami League politician and academic. He was elected twice as a member of Jatiya Sangsad.

Ali was the founding headmaster of Bishnupur High School, which is situated in Feni District's Sonagazi Upazila. Besides he was the General Secretary and President of Feni Subdivision Teachers' Association.

Ali was elected as a member of East Pakistan Provincial Assembly in 1970. He was an organizer of Liberation War of Bangladesh. After liberation he was elected as a member of Jatiyo Sangsad in 1973 and 1979.

Ali died on 7 May 2019 at the age of 92.
