= Mahbubur Rahman (politician, born 1940) =

Bangladeshi lawyer and politician (1940–2021)

- মাহবুবুর রহমান

Ministry of Education
- In office 30 November 1986 – 27 March 1988
- President: Hussain Muhammad Ershad
- Prime Minister: Mizanur Rahman Chowdhury
- Preceded by: Mominuddin Ahmed
- Succeeded by: Anisul Islam Mahmud

Ministry of Religious Affairs, Information, Jute, Irrigation and Flood Control, Information and LGRD
- In office 7 January 1984 – 20 June 1987
- President: Hussain Muhammad Ershad
- Prime Minister: Ataur Rahman Khan (1984–1986) and Mizanur Rahman Chowdhury (1986–1987)
- Preceded by: Position established
- Succeeded by: Nurul Islam

Member of the Bangladesh Parliament for Comilla-7
- In office 15 April 1988 – 6 December 1990
- Preceded by: Mohammad A. Akim
- Succeeded by: Abu Taher

Personal details
- Born: 5 January 1940 Noakhali, Bengal Province, British India (now in Bangladesh)
- Died: 27 March 2021 (aged 81) Comilla, Bangladesh
- Party: Bangladesh Nationalist Party
- Other political affiliations: Jatiya Party (Ershad)
- Children: 6 including Farah Mahbub
- Relatives: Tabarak Husain (brother-in-law)

Mahbubur Rahman (5 January 1940 – 27 March 2021; Bengali: মাহবুবুর রহমান) was a Bangladeshi lawyer and politician.

== Career ==
Rahman was a leader of the Bangladesh Nationalist Party. He was a member of parliament for Noakhali-3 constituency. He served as a member of parliament for four terms and 9 years as a minister in 9 ministries including education minister under Hussain Muhammad Ershad cabinet from 1986 to 1988. Rahman was elected to parliament from Comilla-7 as an Independent candidate in 1988.

He switched from Bangladesh Nationalist Party to Jatiya Party (Ershad) in 2008.

Rahman served as the vice-chairperson of Bangladesh Foreign Trade Institute.

Rahman died of COVID-19 in 2021.

== Personal life ==
Rahman had 4 sons and 2 daughters. His daughter Farah Mahbub has followed him into law, and eventually she became justice of Dhaka High Court.
