= History of Noakhali =

History of Bengal's Greater Noakhali region

The Greater Noakhali district region predominantly includes the districts of Noakhali, Feni and Lakshmipur, although historically included the island of Sandwip in Bay of Bengal. The history of the undivided Noakhali district region begins with the existence of civilisation in the villages of Shilua and Bhulua. Bhulua became a focal point of Bengal during the Buddhist and Hindu kingdoms of Pundra, Harikela and Samatata leading it to become the initial name of the region as a whole. The medieval Kingdom of Bhulua enjoyed autonomy under the Bengal Sultanate before being conquered by the Mughal Empire. At the beginning of the 17th century, Portuguese pirates led by Sebastian Gonzales took control of the ara but were later defeated by Governor Shaista Khan. Affected by floodwaters, the capital of the region was swiftly moved to a new place known as Noakhali, from which the region presently takes its name. By 1756, the British East India Company had dominated and started to establish several factories in the region. The headquarters was once again moved in 1951, to Maijdee, as a result of Noakhali town vanishing due to fluvial erosion.

== Ancient and early medieval ==
Civilisation in the present-day Noakhali region dates back around 3000 years ago, making it one of the youngest sub-regions of Bengal. It was under the realm of Samatata division in south-eastern Bengal. According to Hindu mythology, this region may have been a part of the Shukhma Kingdom. The Hindu epic known as the Mahabharata states that the King of Shukhma was defeated by Bhima, who enforced tribute and seized the gems belonging to the kings of this region. The Allahabad Pillar states that Samatata came under the influence of Samudragupta in the 4th century. The 5th-century Classical Sanskrit author Kalidasa mentions the greenery and palm trees of Shukhma in his Raghuvaṃśa. An undeciphered Brahmi inscription dating back to the Mauryan and Shunga period was discovered in the village of Shilua. The discovery of silver proto-Bengali coins suggest that by the 9th century, the region was a part of the realms of Harikela and Akara. The region was historically known as and based around Bhulua, an ancient town a few miles west of the town of Noakhali. Bhulua was a part of the Pundra Kingdom for much of this period and later under the Khadgas, Harikelans, Chandras, Varmans, Senas and Devas.

The early Rajas of the region were said to have been Kayasthas from West Bengal. According to Hindu legend, Adi Sura's ninth son, Bishwambhar Sur, went on a pilgrimage to the Chandranath Temple atop the Chandranath Hill of Sitakunda. Returning from Sitakunda, Sur passed through present-day Noakhali where he rested and had a dream that Varahi would make him the sovereign of this territory if he worships her. On a cloudy day in 1203 AD, Sur built an altar for Varahi and sacrificed a goat. When the clouds moved away, Sur realised that he had sacrificed the goat to the west, which was not acceptable in Hinduism. As a result, he screamed bhul hua (it was wrong), from which the name Bhulua was said to have come from. Today, the Hindus of Noakhali continue this local tradition by sacrificing goats to the west. Though ancestrally a Rajput, Sur married into a Kayastha family, which his dynasty continued to identify with. A temple in Amishapara, Sonaimuri still contains a stone idol of Varahi. According to tradition, Kalyanpur became the first capital of the Bhulua Kingdom.

In this period, the native Bengalis of the region were said to have been spirit worshippers as opposed to the Benaglis of western and northern Bengal at the time. Prior to this, Hinduism and Buddhism was prevalent in the region.

== Arrival of Muslims ==
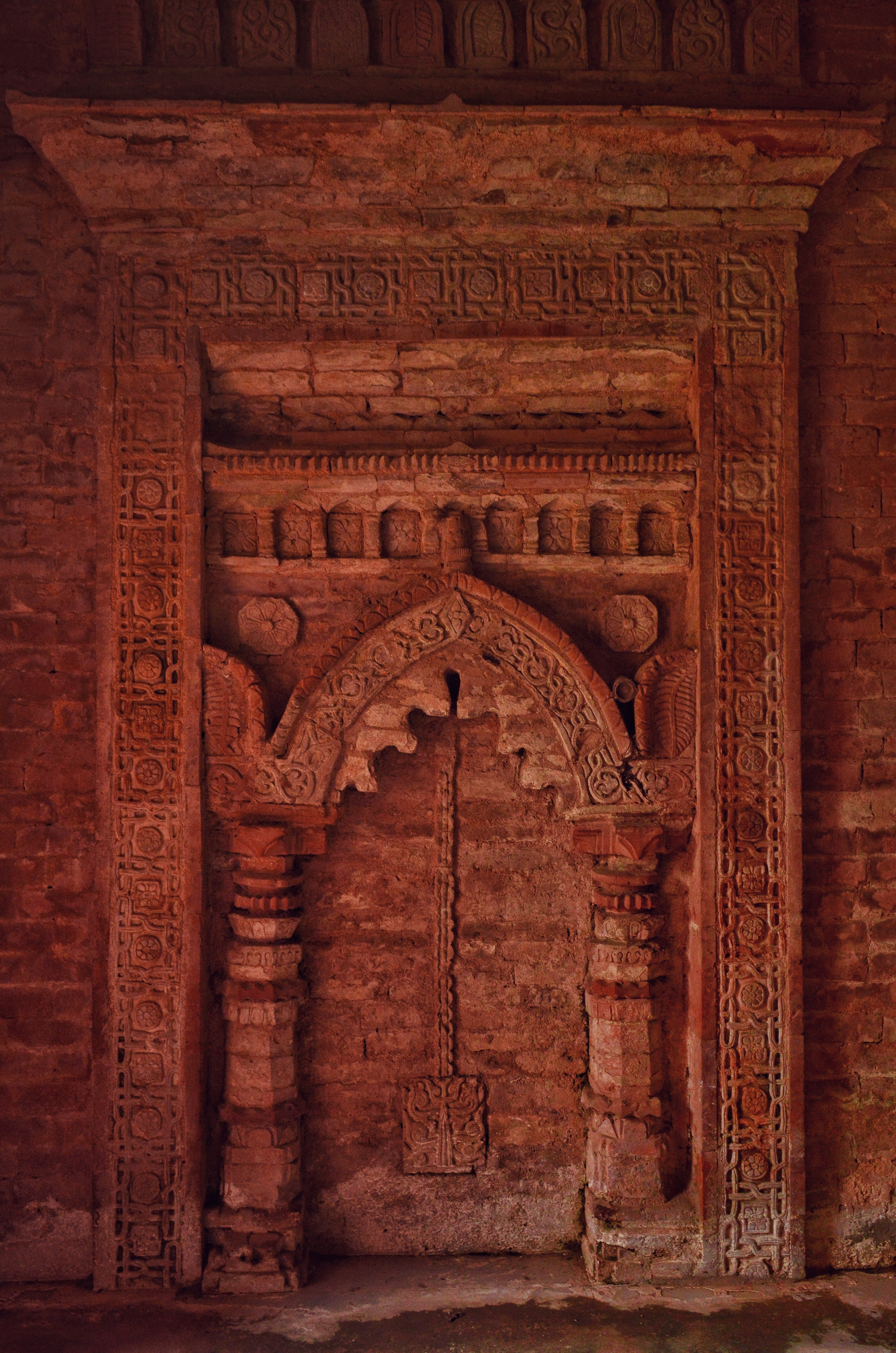
Sultanate-era carvings at the Sharshadi Shahi Mosque.

Islam was said to have first reached the region under the Delhi Sultanate, when Governor Tughral Tughan Khan militarily assisted the nearby Twipra Kingdom in 1279. The armour-bearer of Bahram Khan, the Governor of Sonargaon, was Fakhruddin Mubarak who was said to have his office in Noakhali initially. Some historians have even claimed that Mubarak was born in eastern Noakhali, near Chaprashirhat. The Sharshadi Shahi Mosque in Feni is attributed to Mubarak. After the death of Bahram Khan, Mubarak moved to Sonargaon where he ruled as an independent Sultan. His reign marked the construction of a road from Chittagong to Chandpur via Noakhali. The nearby Sultan of Satgaon, Shamsuddin Ilyas Shah, may have also passed by Noakhali during his raid of Tripura.

The Hindu kingdom of Bhulua remained in the hands of the Bishwambhar Sur (বিশ্বম্ভর শূর) dynasty. The fourth king of Bhulua adopted the name Sriram Khan which suggests that Muslim influence began around this time. Khan founded the village of Srirampur where he built a palace which still exists in ruins today. The sixth king ended the tradition of naming themselves as Khans and adopted the title of Rai. His son however, adopted the name Manikya which suggests that Bhulua may have become a vassal state of the Manikya dynasty's Twipra Kingdom. They had cordial relationships, with the Maharajas of Tripura allowing the Bhulua kings to place the Raj Tika (royal mark) on their foreheads during their coronation.

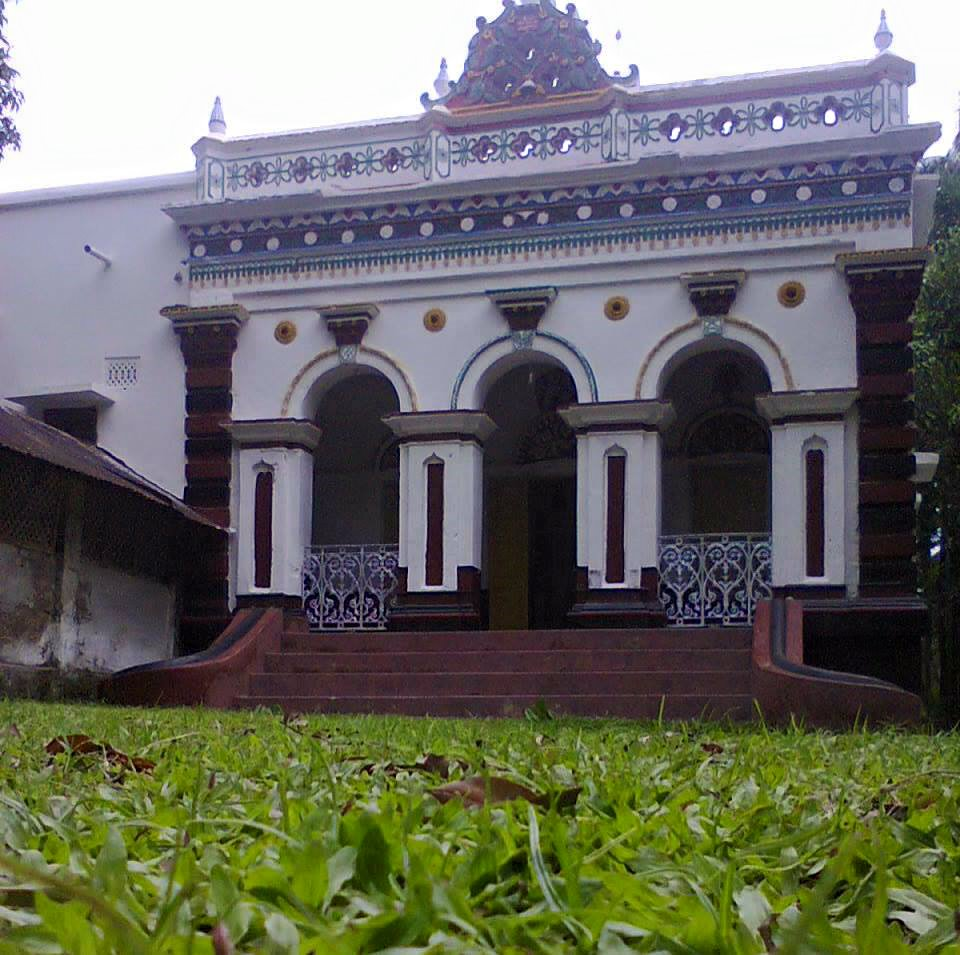
The zamindar palace of the Syed Alam family of Rajganj.

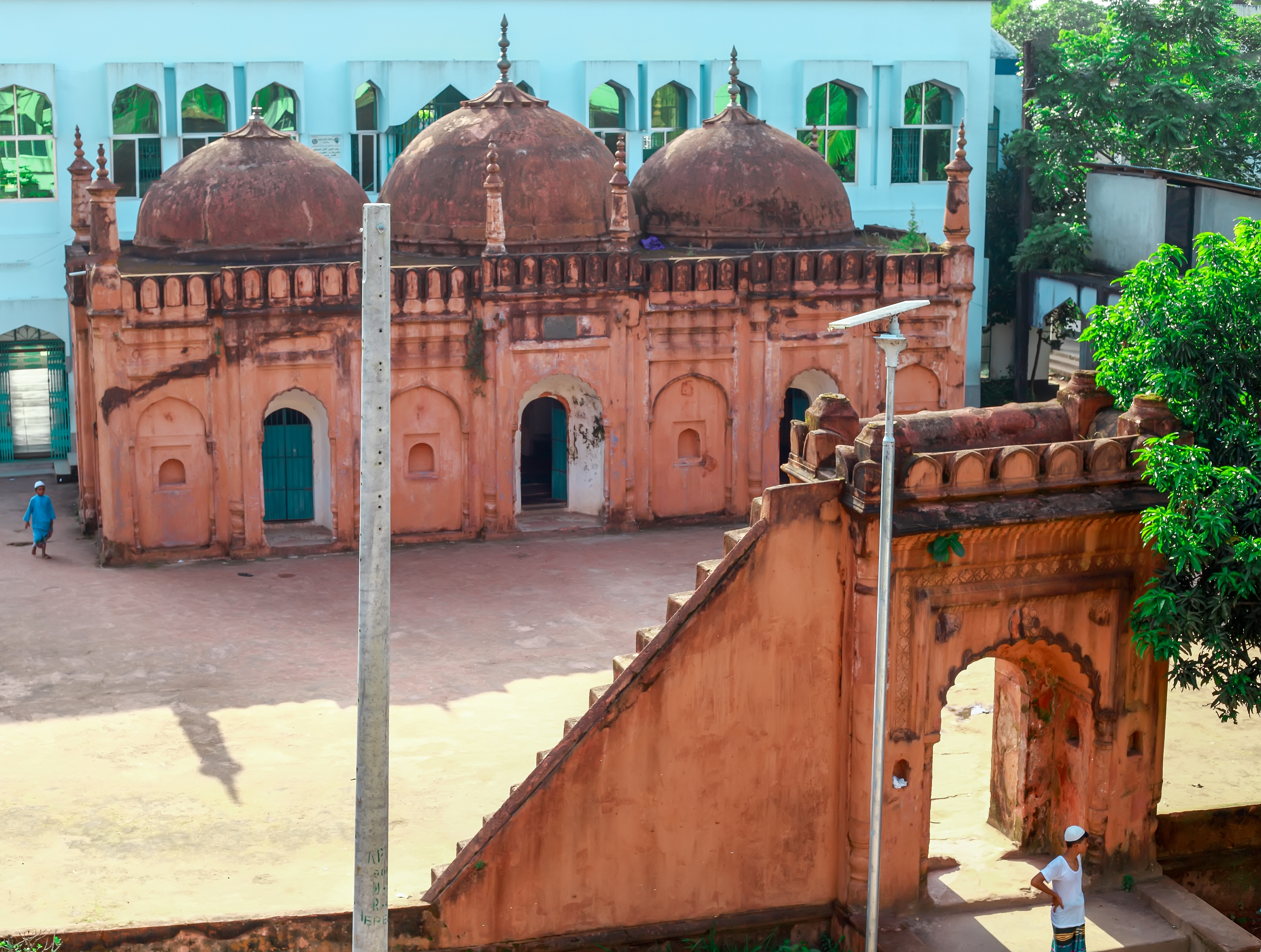
In 1690, Mughal officer Muhammad Ali Chowdhury constructed this mosque in Sharshadi.

To strengthen the defences of the Bhulua Kingdom's frontier from the invasion of the Maghs, Bhulua's king Rajballabh appointed a Muslim general to be a feudal governor of the Elahabad and Dandra parganas. This led to an influx of Muslim migrants into the region. In this period, a Sufi pir and Syed from Baghdad arrived to Bhulua riding on top of a tiger and was thus known by the people as Sher Alam. The Hindu ruler gifted to Syed Sher Alam, two droṇs of land and a large rent-free house in Danaikot, Feni. Alam stayed in Danaikot for a while before setting off to join the Muslims who had settled in Dililpur/Tangirpar (near Rajganj), where he was accepted as their chief. Alam became the founder of the aristocratic Syed Alam family of Rajganj who played important roles in the political history of Noakhali. Syed Nur Alam Chowdhury was from this family.

In the 14th century, Syed Ahmad Tannuri of Baghdad migrated to Kanchanpur, with the intention of propagating Islam. He is also known by locals as Miran Shah. He was accompanied by his wife, Majjuba Bibi, and some companions such as Bakhtiyar Maisuri who settled in Rohini, Shah Muhammad Yusuf in Kitabpur, Shah Muhammad Fazalullah in Raipur, Shah Nuruddin in Bhatuiya, Shah Badshah Mian in Dalilpur Tangir Par, Miyan Sahib Baghdadi in Harichar, and Shah Abdullah and Shah Yaqub Nuri in Noakhali town. Following the Conquest of Sylhet in 1303, some disciples of Shah Jalal migrated to Noakhali, such as Shaykh Jalaluddin who settled in Nandanpur. Other notable Muslim preachers who settled in Noakhali include Ahsan Hasan Shah, Azam Shah and Shah Amiruddin.

Lakshmana Manikya was the eighth and most prominent king of Bhulua. He authored two Sanskrit dramas, Bikhyata Bijaya and Kubalayasva Charita, and was a member of the 16th-century Baro-Bhuiyans of Bengal. Hundreds of Brahmins were invited to Bhulua by Manikya, who gave them land in Chapali, Kilpara, Barahinagar and Srirampur. His court scholar Pandit Raghunath authored Kautuka Ratnakara. Manikya would often make fun of Ramchandra, the young ruler of Bakla and Chandradwip, which eventually led to Ramchandra plotting against him. Ramchandra crossed the Meghna River and invited him to a banquet in which his men captured Manikya and murdered him back in Chandradwip.

Lakshmana was succeeded by his son, the ninth King of Bhulua, Durlabha Narayan Balaram Manikya. Balaram Manikya's court poet was Abdur Razzaq of Balukia in Bedrabad, who wrote Sayful Mulk o Lal Banu in 1770 CE. Unlike the former kings of Bhulua, Balaram refused to attend the coronation of the Twipra Raja Amar Manikya, as he perceived him to be an illegitimate ruler and essentially declared total independence from Tripura. Some sources claim this was in 1579, while others in 1578. As a result, Amar Manikya raided Bhulua and Balaram was eventually forced to become a vassal ruler again. Amar Manikya was digging a tank, now known as Amar Sagar, in his capital at Udaipur for religious reasons and demanded various chieftains to supply labour for this task and pay tribute. The Rajmala chronicles highlights Bhulua sending 1000 labourers for the task.

== Mughal period ==
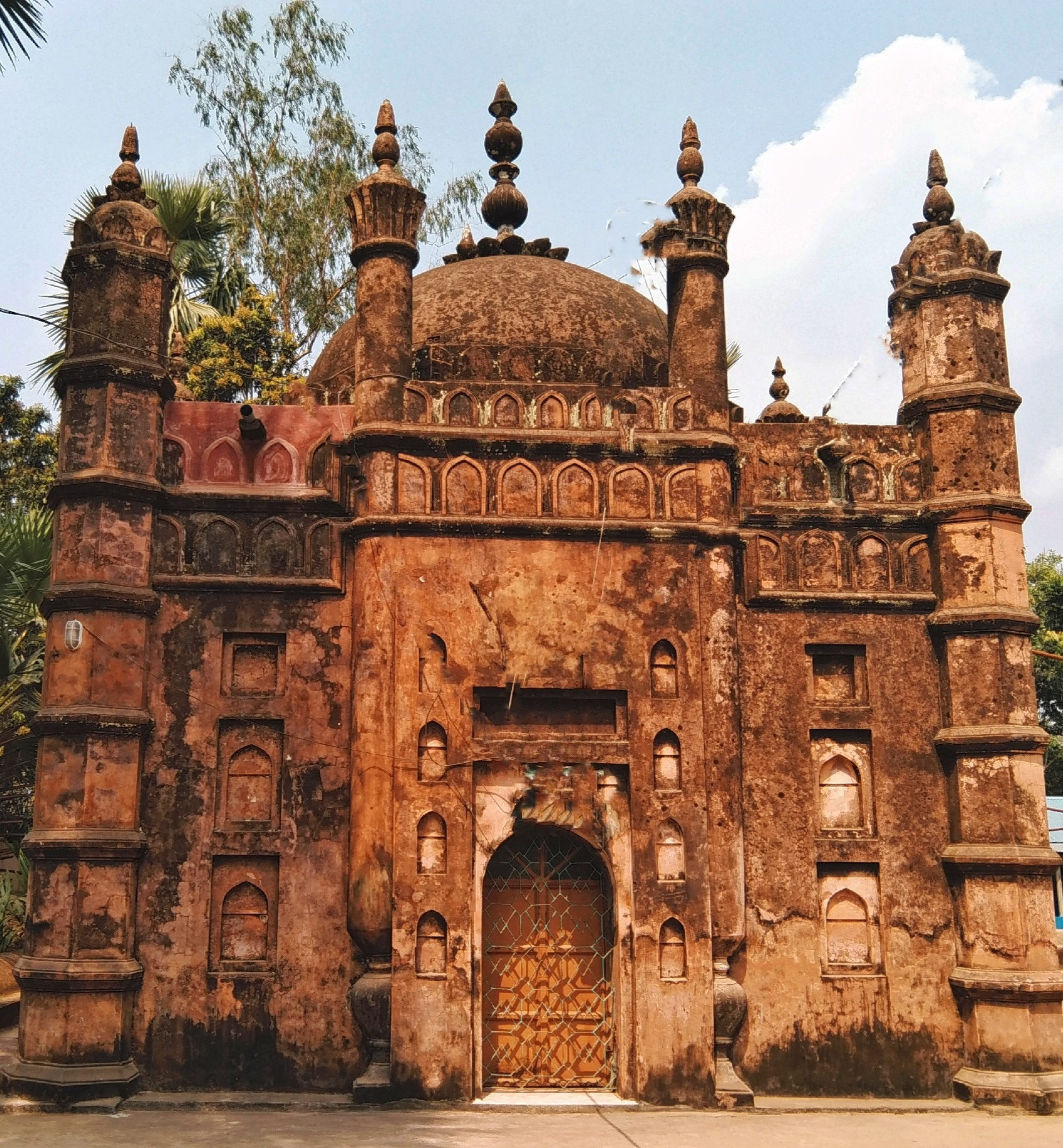
A mosque in Chhagalnaiya built by Zamindar Chand Ghazi Bhuiyan in 1701.

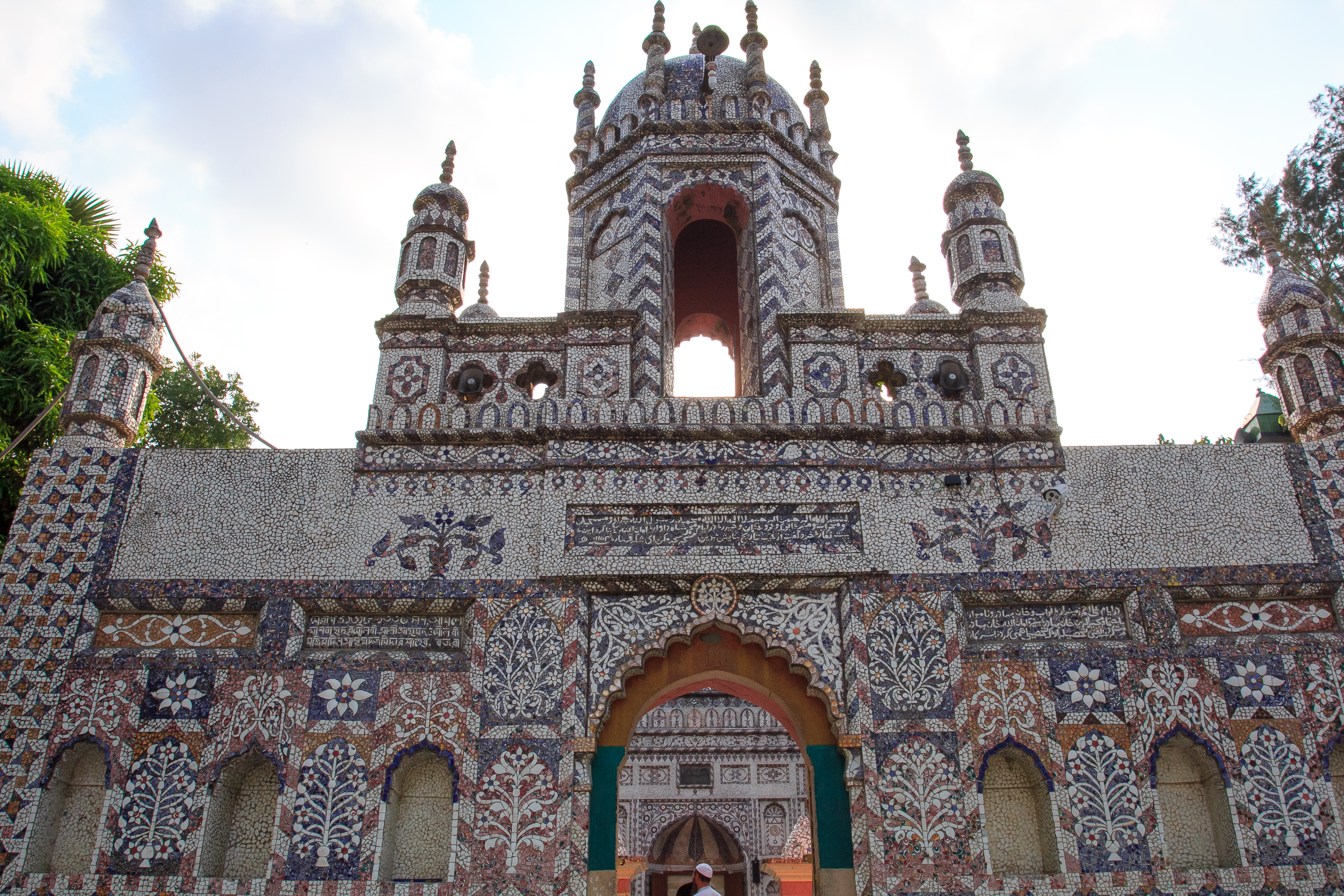
Aman Ullah had the Bajra Shahi Mosque built during the reign of Mughal emperor Muhammad Shah in 1741–42.

In the late 1580s, King Min Phalaung of Arakan invaded much of present-day Noakhali. The Mughal invasions and conquests in Bengal started during the reigns of Emperors Humayun and Akbar. Present-day Noakhali was a part of the Sarkar of Sonargaon and divided into three parganas: Bhalwa Jawar (Bhulua), Jogidia (Jugdia) and Dandra. The pargana of Bhalwa Jawar encompassed several former parganas such as Amirabad, Tappe Aswadia, Babupur, Chakla Ghoshbag, Gopalpur, Jainagar, Mirzanagar and Ramchandrapur.. The Battle of Rajmahal in 1576 led to the execution of Daud Khan Karrani, ending the Karrani sultanate. Bengal was fully integrated as a Mughal province known as the Bengal Subah by 1612 during the reign of Jahangir. Amirabad was established as the fourth Mughal pargana of Bhalwa, situated in the centre. The Mughals briefly captured Sarkar Udaipur which is how Chhagalnaiya became a part of greater Noakhali.

During the reign of Mughal emperor Jahangir, the Subahdar of Bengal Islam Khan I sent a force to take over Bhalwa, which was ruled by Ananta Manikya, another son of Lakshmana Manikya of the Bishwambhar Sur dynasty. The expedition consisted of the forces of Mirza Nuruddin, Mirza Isfandiyar, Haji Shamsuddin Baghdadi, Khwaja Asl, Adil Beg and Mirza Beg, in addition to 500 members of the Subahdar's cavalry. Khan appointed Shaykh Abdul Wahid as the main commander of the entire expedition, which in total was made up 50 elephants, 3000 matchlockers and 4000 cavalry. Ananta Manikya set up defences around Bhalwa with the Magh Raja's assistance, before proceeding forward to the Dakatia banks where he built a fort. The Mughals reached the fort in a few days, and a battle commenced resulting in a number of deaths on both sides. The Bhalwa forces also planned a surprise attack at night. Manikya's chief minister, Mirza Yusuf Barlas, surrendered to the Mughal forces and was rewarded by Abdul Wahid as a mansabdar of 500 soldiers and 300 horses. After losing Barlas however, Manikya did not surrender and rather retreated to Bhalwa at midnight to strengthen the fort there. News of the retreat reached the Mughals two pahars later, and so they began following the Bhalwa forces. Having no time to defend themselves, Manikya retreated further to seek refuge with the Magh Raja Min Razagyi but was defeated at the banks of the Feni River. The Mughals seized all of Manikya's elephants, and Abdul Wahid successfully took control of Bhalwa.

During the governorship of Qasim Khan Chishti, Shaykh Abdul Wahid sent his son on a mission to raid Tripura whilst he set off to meet with the Governor at Jahangirnagar, leaving a Mutasaddi to take care of Bhalwa. Effectively, the Magh Raja Min Khamaung saw this as an opportunity to raid Bhalwa, and so he set off for Bhalwa with a large force from Arakan consisting of cavalry, elephants, artillery, infantry. Khamaung also had a large fleet which he ordered to join their ally Sebastian Gonzales, the Portuguese ruler of Sandwip. The Mutasaddi sent a messenger to Jahangirnagar, warning them of the raid, but Governor Qasim Khan Chishti thought it was probably an excuse for Abdul Wahid to leave his presence. After further warnings from the thanadars of Bikrampur and Sripur, Chishti granted Abdul Wahid permission to leave. Chishti himself marched to Khizrpur where he commanded that all rivers connecting Khizrpur to Bhalwa are to be bridged with large cargo ships such as Patila and Bhadia. He also sent a message to Syed Abu Bakr, to cancel the Conquest of Assam and bring the fleet back to Bengal in order to suppress the Maghs, and also appointed Sazawals to bring the forces of Mirza Makki and Shaykh Kamal to Jahangirnagar, ready for the Bhalwa battle. Chishti then sent a force of 4000 of his own matchlockers and 2000 horsemen, that were commanded by his son, Shaykh Farid and General Abdun Nabi towards Bhalwa, safely through the Lakhya River. They managed to chase out Khamaung from Bhalwa, who left behind large numbers of his troops and elephants. In 1615, Khamaung returned to Bhalwa again leading Abdul Wahid to flee with his family across the Dakatia River. Khamaung took control Bhalwa for a short time before Mirza Nuruddin and other Mughal statesmen led their cavalry against him. Many Arakanese soldiers were killed and captured, forcing Khamaung to surrender. Khamaung gave away his nephew, elephants and equipment to the Mughals before safely returning to Chittagong. Abdul Wahid returned to Bhalwa in January 1616.

By the 1620s, it said that Muslims had established an outpost near the village of Bhalwa which they called Islamabad. Historians have identified it with modern-day Lakshmipur. Mirza Baqi, the former Bakhshi of the Subahdar of Bengal Ibrahim Khan Fath-i-Jang, was appointed as the Thanadar of Bhalwa in addition to being given a mansabdari of 500 soldiers with 400 horses. Shah Jahan defeated Ibrahim Khan and took control of Bengal in 1624. The King of Arakan Thiri Thudhamma took advantage of this and successfully raided Bhalwa despite Mirza Baqi's naval capabilities. Another thana was later established by the Mughals in Jugdia in eastern Noakhali. The two thanas were strategically important for the Mughals in their battles with the Arakanese, Tripura and Portuguese.

In 1638, there was internal conflict in Arakan due to the death of King Min Sanay, son of late Min Khamaung, and the subsequent usurpation of Narapati. Khamaung's brother Mangat Rai, who was the Arakanese governor of Chittagong, did not recognise Narapati's rule and so declared the independence of Chittagong and a war against Narapati. His attempt failed and as a result, Rai marched towards Jugdia in Noakhali for safety along with other Arakanese nobles of the former regime. With the permission of Subahdar Islam Khan II, the Thanadar of Jugdia used gunfire to drive away 400 of Narapati's jalias and allow Rai to cross the Feni River and enter the Mughal territory. Narapati sent another fleet from Chittagong towards Bhalwa and Jahangirnagar (Dhaka) but they could not penetrate the Mughal defence. Mangat Rai's Portuguese allies also began migrating from Chittagong to Bhalwa, where they accepted Islam and culturally assimilated with the local population. As a result of escaping Arakanese dominion, the Portuguese lost 10,000 of their slaves who returned back to their homelands in Bengal.

The agricultural activities of north-eastern Bhalwa were seriously affected by floodwaters of the Dakatia River flowing from the Tripura hills in the 1660s. To salvage the situation, a canal was dug in 1660 that ran from the Dakatia through Ramganj, Sonaimuri and Chowmuhani to divert water flow to the junction of the Meghna River and Feni River. After excavating this long canal, a new town was founded which locals called "Noakhali" meaning new canal though the Bhulua name remained prevalent. In 1661, Dutch sailors were shipwrecked at Bhulua and were taken care of by the Bhulua rulers.

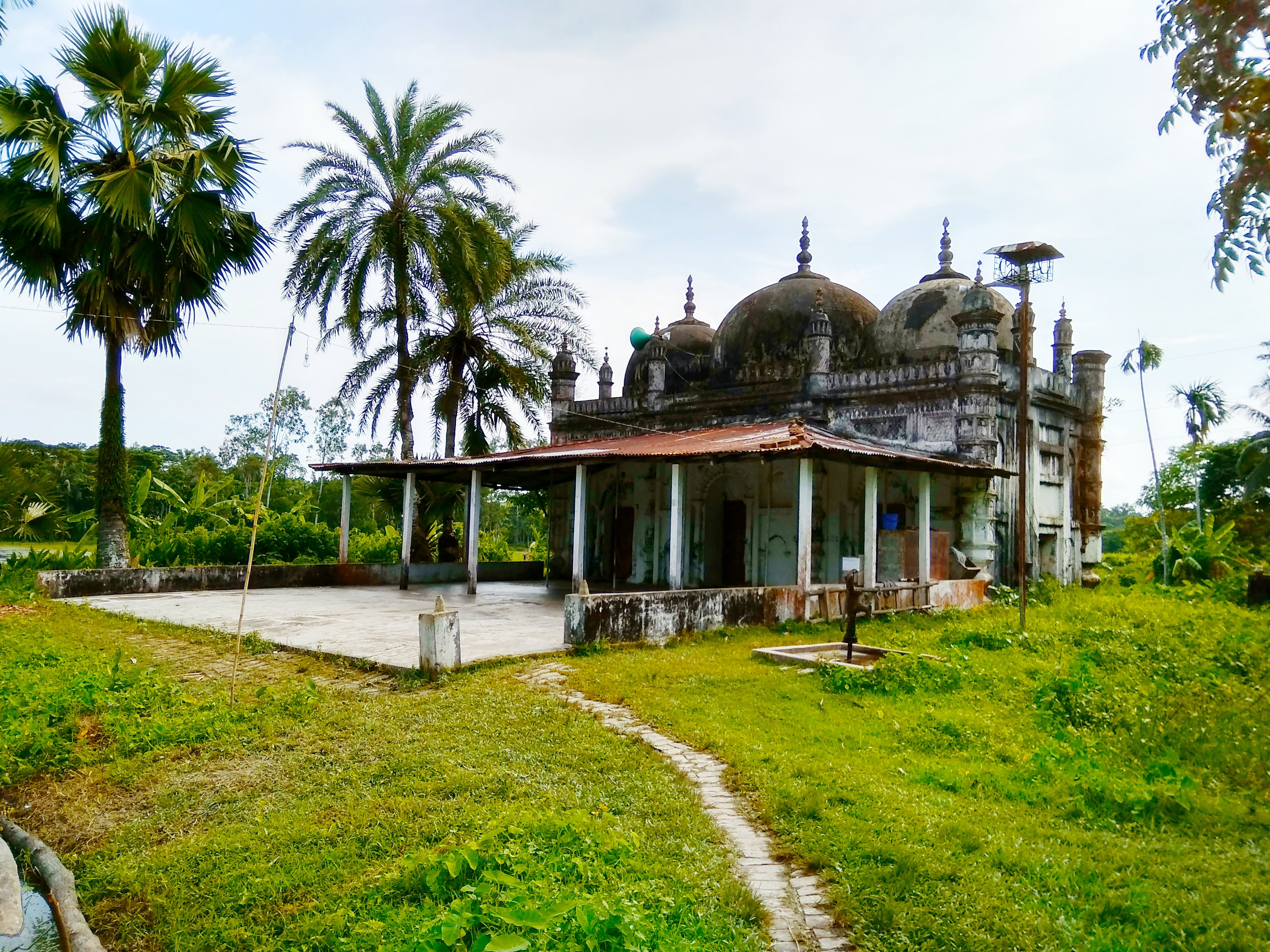
During the reign of Shah Alam II in 1770, the Ramadan Miah Mosque was constructed by Shaykh Noor Ullah Chowdhury and Shaykh Mujeer Ullah Chowdhury

During the reign of Emperor Aurangzeb, and Farhad Khan served as the Thanadar of Bhalwa from 1665 to 1670. During the 1665 Mughal conquest of nearby Chittagong, the Firingis led by Captain Moor set fire to Arakanese fleets and fled to Bhulua where Farhad gave them refuge. Farhad later sent them off to the Subahdar of Bengal Shaista Khan in Jahangirnagar. During Shaista Khan's governorship, Bhulua was incorporated into the Chakla of Jahangirnagar. The ruins of a 17th-century Mughal fort can be found in the village of Bhulua.

In 1728, Noakhali region was divided into 14 parganas of the Sarkar of Sonargaon. These were: Amurabad-Dunderah, Amirabad-Noabad-Bulwah, Ammerabad-Dunderah, Allahabad (Elahabad), Bedarabad, Bulwah (Bhulua), Baboopoor (Babupur), Denderah (Dandra), Gopaulnagar-Bulwah (Gopalnagar-Bhulua), Jogdeah (Jugdia), Kunchenpoor (Kanchanpur), Kudwah-Bulwah, Mirzanagur of Gopaulnagur (Mirzanagar) and Shaistehnagur (Shaistanagar). Prominent zamindars of this time were Raja Kirti Narayan of Bhulua, Bijay Narayan of Kudwah-Bhulua, Muhammad Arayet of Elahabad and Dandra, Shafiuddin of Mirzanagar, Audy Narayan of Babupur and Raghuram of Jugdia.

During the reign of Mughal emperor Muhammad Shah, a Muslim missionary from Iran known as Pir Mian Ambar Shah, also known as Umar Shah, arrived in the region by boat. To facilitate his settlement and propagation, the emperor had a copperplate made designating Bajra as a tax-free settlement for him. The word Bajra means large boat, being a corruption of bara-nauka, taking its name from Umar Shah's boat where the Pir initially lived in and preached to the locals. Umar Shah also raised Amanullah and Thanaullah, the two sons of a local widow from Chhangaon. It was under Umar Shah's instructions that Amanullah established the Bajra Shahi Mosque and Thanaullah dug the 30-acre reservoir in front of the mosque. Construction began in 1715 CE and it was completed in 1741. Another wali who migrated to the region to spread Islam was Pir Mir Ahmad Khandakar who settled in Babupur.

== Company rule ==
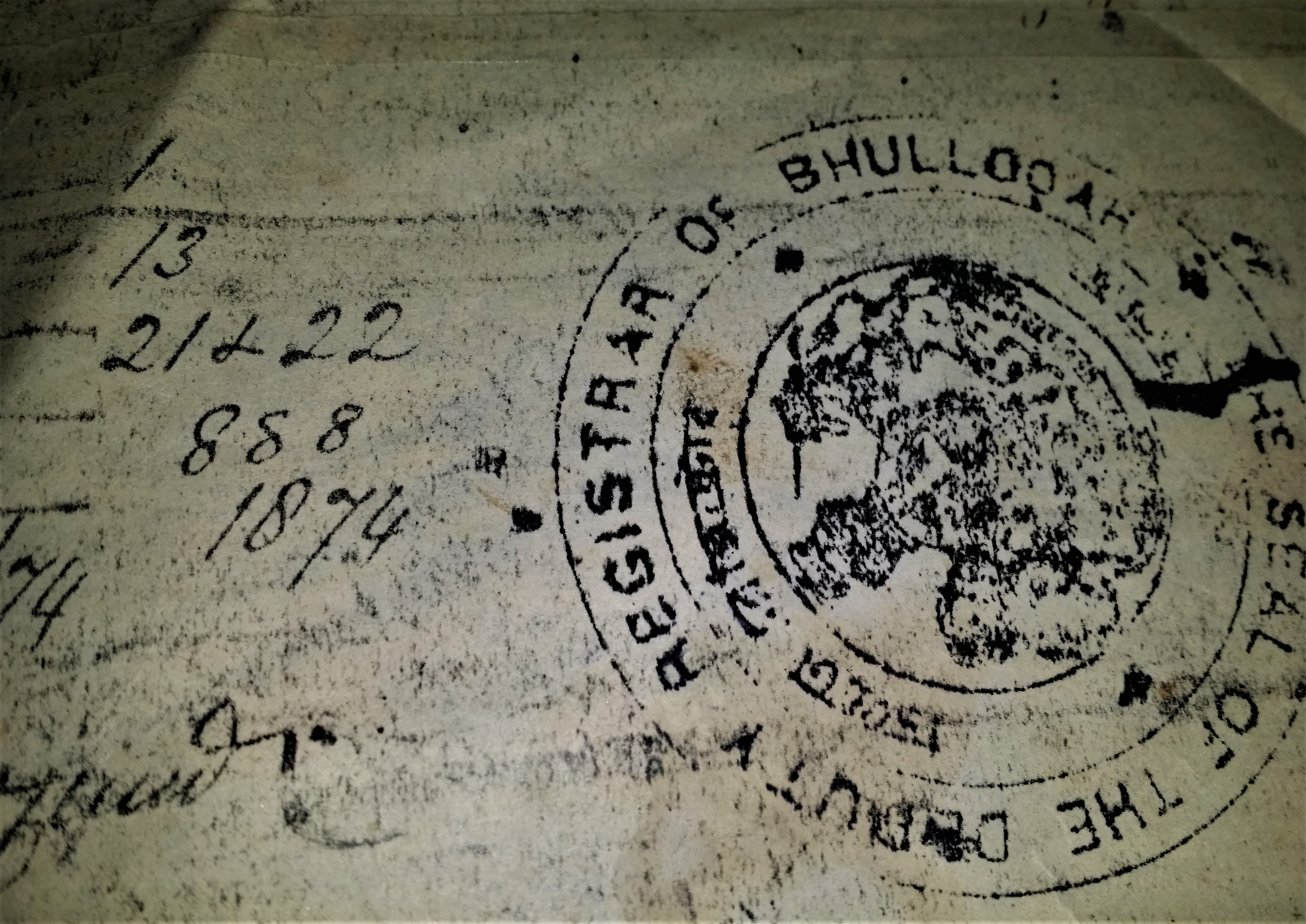
A seal of Bhullooah (Noakhali) Registrar Office sealed on 20 March 1874.

ভুলুয়া শহর হয় অতি দিব্যস্থান
Bhulua shohor hoy oti dibbosthan
সেই সে শহর হয় অতি ভাল জান
Shei she shohor hoy oti bhalo jan
সৈয়দ কাজী আছে যত মুসলমান
Soiyod Qazi acche joto musolman
নানা জাতি আছে যত ব্রাম্মন সজ্জন
Nana jati acche joto Brahmon shojjon

— A poem written by Shaykh Sadi of Bhulua.

By 1756, the British East India Company had built weaving factories near the Feni River in Jugdia. The French East India Company also set up huge textile mills there and these textiles and salt, including the native textiles produced by the Tantis, were exported abroad through the Port of Jugdia. Bhullooah came under British administration in 1765 and was made a part of the Bengal Presidency's Dacca Division. Sandwip and Feni were put under the administration of the Collector of Chittagong. By 1787, Bhulua became a district with its own Collector and Assistant Collector. Later that year, John Shore of Teignmouth ordered for Bhulua to be under the responsibility of the Collector of Mymensingh. When the District of Tippera (Comilla) was formed in 1790, the Noakhali mainland joined that district with Dandridge governing the Bhulua Pargana. Dandridge's office in Noakhali consisted of three years, in which he would have a bad relationship with the factory owners and salt agents. He was eventually replaced by Thompson before there was direct control by the Collector of Tippera.

In the late eighteenth century, Muhammad Qasim (d. 1790) emerged as a popular Bengali-language poet of Noakhali. He was the son of Abdul Aziz of Jugdia and he composed Siraj al-Qulub, Hitopodesh and Sultan Jamjama. In 1820, the Calaries Committee had a meeting to solve the problems that were prevalent in Bhulua between the factory owners, salt agents and collectors. Lord Plowden, the Salt Agent of Noakhali, proposed that Bhulua be made its own district, with him being given the role as Collector of Bhulua. The Governor-General Francis Rawdon-Hastings accepted this recommendation in 1821. The town of Noakhali was made its capital and later came to be known as Sudharam, after Sudharam Majumdar, a local businessman who excavated a large reservoir named after himself. On 29 March 1822, Hastings passed an order in this regard and accordingly a new district was constituted with: South Shahbazpur, Sudharam, Begumganj, Ramganj, Raipur, Lakshmipur, Feni, Parshuram, Elahabad Pargana of Tippera and Hatia, Sandwip and Bamni of Chittagong district.

The advent of the British East India Company with its "exploitation and oppression" alongside zamindari subjugation, made life of the peasants and farmers difficult and despondent. A zamindar named Shamsher Gazi's exempted the peasants and became a powerful leader, later spreading his territory as far as Tripura. Viewed as a "notorious plunderer" in the Tippera District, Noakhali and Chittagong areas, he was later arrested by Mir Qasim by subterfuge for his excesses and put to death by a cannon. In the 18th century, Nurullah of Chittagong wrote a eulogistic poem titled Sifatnama which contained information about the erstwhile upper-class families of Feni. His contemporary, Sanaullah of Chakhirpais in Noakhali, used to make copies of historical poems.

In the 1830s, Moulvi Imamuddin Bengali ushered an Islamic reformist movement in Noakhali and recruited people for participation in anti-British rebellions. Under his leadership, the local Bengalis formed a significant portion of belligerents at the Afghan–Sikh Wars, particularly at the Battle of Balakot against Ranjit Singh in 1831. Imamuddin returned to Noakhali following the war and continued to preach his ideas to the masses alongside Alauddin Bengali. These included abstaining from innovations such as the veneration of holy men.

Bhulua was constituted into the Chittagong Division in 1829, which it continues to be part of today. The Collector of Noakhali noted that during the Indian Rebellion of 1857, his district was completely peaceful.

== British Raj ==
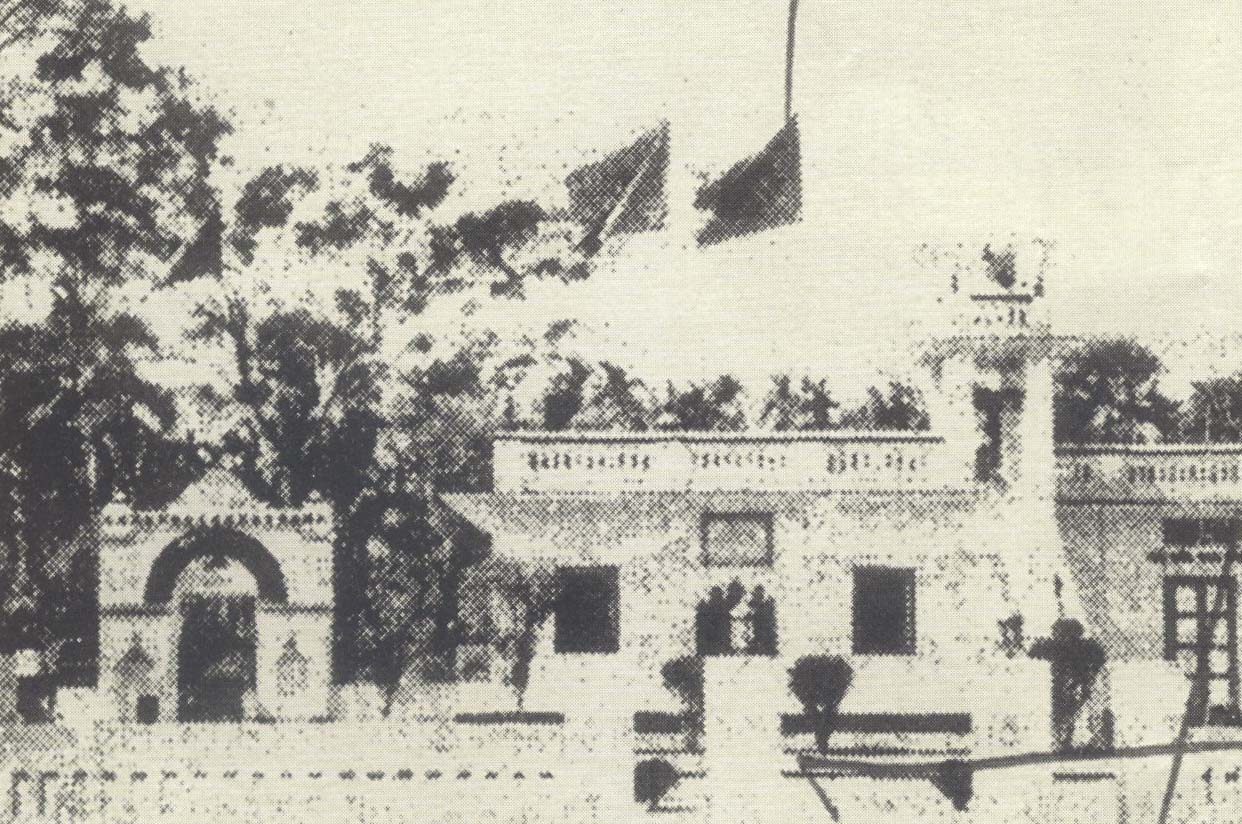
The Dayra Sharif in Shyampur.

As a result of river breakage, many Sandwipis descended from a Brahmin women migrated to Rampur in Companiganj. These Sandwipis of Companiganj are said to maintain a distinct identity to the native Companiganjis.

In the 1860s, a large unit of Kukis from Hill Tippera led by Kuki Riang entered the Chhagalnaiya plains (then in Tippera/Comilla) where they looted the area of Bakhshganj and murdered Kamal Poddar of Basantpur. They then proceeded to molest Poddar's women until Guna Ghazi and Jakimal waged war against them in the village of Kulapara. Whilst the Kukis abducted 700 women, Munshi Abdul Ali informed the British authorities of the atrocities. 185 Britons were assassinated, 100 of them were kidnapped and the Kukis remained in the plains for one or two days. British troops and policemen were finally despatched from Noakhali, Tipperah (Comilla) and Chittagong to suppress them but the Kukis had already fled to the jungles of the princely state and they never returned ever again. This event was recorded in detail in the Kukikatar Puthi by the Bengali poet Gul Bakhsh, who also states that following the event, Guna Ghazi was falsely accused by villagers for things which he had not done and that the British officers began to recruit locals for forced labour in order to increase security.

The Bhulua district was renamed Noakhali in 1868. The following year, South Shahbazpur was given to Bakerganj District. The boundaries between Tippera and Noakhali were adjusted on 31 May 1875 in which Noakhali gained 43 villages and lost 22. In 1876, Noakhali district was divided into two sub-divisions; Sadar and Feni. Feni Sub-division was constituted with: Chhagalnaiya thana (formerly in Tippera/Comilla), Mirsharai thana (formerly in Chittagong), Feni Pargana, Parshuram and Sonagazi. In 1878, Mirsharai was given back to the Chittagong District. Another boundary adjustment took place in 1881, with the Feni River being made the dividing line between Noakhali and Chittagong districts, resulting in Noakhali gaining four villages.

In 1893, a cyclone heavily damaged half of the region's betel nut palms, in addition to the region's harvest. A large amount of cattle also drowned although not many human deaths occurred. The aftermath of the cyclone led to an outbreak of cholera which caused the betel nut palms to suffer from blight. This in turn killed thousands of Bengalis. Abnormally heavy rainfall occurred in 1896 which also caused havoc in the region and damaged crops. Regardless of these natural disasters, the annual birth rate of this region was much higher than the annual death rate; with a 23% increase in population from 1881 to 1891. The western parts of the region, places such as Ramganj Upazila, did not suffer as much from the cyclone though the blight had spread via the Meghna River. A manuscript titled Bara Tufaner Kabita (Poem of the Great Storm) was discovered and scholars consider it to either be referring to the cyclone of 1837 or 1897 which caused great damage in Noakhali and Chittagong.

In the 1901 census, the district's area was 1,644 mi^{2} (4,260 km^{2}) and its population was about 1,141,728. The Bamni River drowned a large portion of Companiganj, which led to Jalia Kaibartas to migrate to Sandwip. The southern part of Sudharam also suffered from land loss, and a number of Chhagalnaiya residents began leaving their colonial homeland, subsequently migrating to Hill Tippera. A number of riverine islands (chars) emerged within the district borders, which also caused migration. Sudharam had the most Muslims in the region, most likely due to it historically being the Mughal stronghold of the Noakhali region. Chhagalnaiya had the most Hindus, most likely due to it being under the Twipra Kingdom and only lately joining the colonial district.

The pro-Ottoman Caliphate Movement which originated in North India, gained momentum in Noakhali following the visit of two of the movement's founders; Shaukat Ali and Mohammad Ali Jauhar. The movement was under the local leadership of Haji Abdur Rashid Khan and Hafezzi Huzur. Regional violence in 1946 escalated communal tensions throughout British India just before the 1947 partition. The All-India Muslim League gained a lot of support in Noakhali, with local leaders such as Habibullah Bahar Chowdhury, Shamsunnahar Mahmud, Khan Bahadur Abdul Gofran. Attacks against both Muslim and Hindu communities took place in Noakhali which came to be known as the Noakhali riots. Shahid Nazir became a notable activist of the Pakistan Movement after being martyred. A huge number of mass killing, raping, looting, and forcible conversions took place. The prime minister of Bengal, Huseyn Shaheed Suhrawardy, answering a question from Dhirendranath Datta in the assembly early in 1947 stated that there had been cases of forcible conversion in Noakhali, running into the thousands.

== Post-Partition of India ==
Sudharam/Noakhali town, the headquarters of Noakhali, vanished in the river-bed in 1951 as a result of erosion of the Meghna River. A new headquarters for the Noakhali District was then established at Maijdee. In 1964, Sadar Sub-division was divided into two sub-divisions namely Sadar and Lakshmipur.

About 75 Bengali freedom fighters were killed in Noakhali during a direct encounter with the Pakistan army on 15 June 1971, in front of the Sonapur Ahmadia School. Noakhali was liberated on 7 December 1971.

In 1984, the District of Noakhali was further divided into three districts for administrative convenience; Noakhali District, Lakshmipur and Feni. As a result of partition, the withdrawal of Feni River Water became a source of conflict between Bangladesh and the Republic of India.

== See also ==
- History of Chittagong
- History of Sandwip
