= Bhulua Kingdom =

Kingdom in present-day Bangladesh

Kingdom of Bhulua ভুলুয়া রাজ্য
- 1203–1613
- Capital: Kalyanpur; Bhulua
- Recognised national languages: Old Noakhailla Sanskrit
- Religion: Hinduism
- Government: Monarchy
- Raja
  - 1203: Bishwambhar Sur (first)
  - c. 1600: Ananta Manikya (last ruler under Tripura vassalage)
  - 1728: Kirti Narayan (zamindar)
- Chief Minister
  - 1600s: Mirza Yusuf Barlas
- Historical era: Mediaeval period
  - Established: 1203
  - Disestablished: 1613
| Preceded by | Succeeded by |
| Sena Dynasty; Deva Dynasty | Mughal Empire |
- Today part of: Bangladesh

The Kingdom of Bhulua (Bengali: ভুলুয়া রাজ্য, romanized: Bhulua Rajjo) was a medieval kingdom of Bengal and later a zamindari, covering the present-day Noakhali region of Bangladesh. According to local tradition the establishment of the kingdom dates from the thirteenth century, when Bishwambhar Sur, ninth son of Adi Sur, a Kshatriya of Mithila who passed by the area during a pilgrimage. The kingdom fell under Tripura vassalage in the 15th century, and was reduced to a zamindari (fiefdom) after losing to the Mughals. Most of the kingdom's land has been eroded by the Meghna River.

== Origin ==
The members of the ruling dynasty of Bhulua were members of the Kayastha caste and the chiefdom continued to maintain cultural connections with the Mithila region. Local traditions assert the Maithili origin of the family.

== Establishment ==
According to legend, Bishwambhar Sur went on a pilgrimage to the Chandranath Temple atop the Chandranath Hill of Sitakunda. Returning from Sitakunda, Sur passed through what is now known as the Noakhali region, where he rested. During this rest, Sur had a dream that Varahi would make him the sovereign of this territory if he worships her. On a cloudy day in 1203 AD, Sur built an altar for Varahi and sacrificed a goat. When the clouds moved away, Sur realised that he had sacrificed the goat to the west, which was not acceptable in Hinduism. As a result, he screamed bhul hua (it was wrong), from which the name Bhulua was said to have come from. However, Sur nevertheless colonised the land and became its ruler. The practice of sacrificing goats westwards became common among the Hindus of Bhulua. The Rajmala states Amishapara as the first capital of the kingdom, and this backed up by the presence of an ancient temple in the area which contains a stone idol of Varahi. According to local tradition however, it was Kalyanpur that was the first capital of Bhulua.

== Muslim influence ==
In 1298, a Sunni Qadiri Muslim missionary group led by the three sons of Azallah Shah (descendant of Abdul Qadir Gilani) initially settled at the Shyampur Dairah Sharif, a Sufi khanqah located in Bhulua. They began preaching Islam there, with one son Syed Ahmad Tannuri (Miran Shah) also spreading Islam in Kanchanpur, Lakshmipur. It is said that Fakhruddin Mubarak Shah (r. 1338–1349), the Sultan of Sonargaon, conquered parts of Bhulua and annexed it to his kingdom. Sriram, the fourth king of Bhulua, adopted the title of Khan which shows an influence which Islam and the neighbouring Delhi Sultanate had on the Hindu-ruled kingdom. The village of Srirampur was founded by Raja Sriram Khan and the ruins of his palace can still be found there. His son also kept the title of Khan, though his grandson exchanged the title for Rai.

== Tripura vassalage ==
In 1520, Deva Manikya of Tripura conquered Bhulua, although they still maintained some level of autonomy. The seventh king of Bhulua used the title of Manikya, and had a cordial relationship with the Maharajas of Tripura. The Bhulua kings were given the honour of placing the Raj Tika (royal mark) on the foreheads of the Tripura kings during their coronations.

To strengthen the defences of the Bhulua frontier from frequent Magh invasions, King Rajballabh appointed governors across his kingdom. The Elahabad and Dandra parganas were given to Syed Sher Alam, a Muslim general from Baghdad. The seventh king of Bhulua was Gandharva Manikya, who was succeeded by his son.

Lakshmana Manikya was the eighth and most prominent king of Bhulua, and was considered to have been a member of the Baro-Bhuiyans. He authored two Sanskrit dramas, Vikhyatavijaya (বিখ্যাতবিজয়) and Kuvalayashvacarita (কুবলয়াশ্বতচরিত). He was responsible for inviting hundreds of Brahmins to Bhulua and gifting them land in Chapali, Kilpara, Barahinagar and Srirampur. His court scholar Pandit Raghunath, under the pen name of Kavitarkik, authored the Kautukaratnakara (কৌতুকরত্নকার) play which includes a brief history of the Bhulua kingdom and its ruling dynasty in its preface. It also mentions the importance of the Bhulua Kingdom in the fields of culture, education and literature. Manikya also went into conflict with Ramchandra, the young ruler of Bakla and Chandradwip, who he used to frequently make fun of. On one occasion, Ramchandra plotted against him by crossing the Meghna River and inviting Manikya to a banquet in which his men captured Manikya to Chandradwip, where they murdered him.

Durlabha Narayan Balaram Manikya was another son of Lakshmana Manikya. His court poet was Abdur Razzaq of Balukia in Bedrabad, author of Sayful Mulk o Lal Banu. Between 1578 and 1579, Balaram broke the tradition of attending the coronation of the Maharajas of Tripura as he perceived Amar Manikya to be an illegitimate ruler. Perceiving this as a declaration of Bhulua's independence, Amar Manikya raided the Bhulua Kingdom with his forces, eventually forcing Balaram to maintain Bhulua as a vassalage of Tripura. During the excavation of Amar Sagar reservoir in Udaipur, Amar Manikya demanded various local chieftains of Bengal to supply labour for the task and pay him tribute. In response, the Bhulua king sent 1000 labourers.

== Mughal rule ==
During the reign of Mughal emperor Jahangir, the Subahdar of Bengal Islam Khan I sent a force to take over the kingdom, which was now under Ananta Manikya, another son of Lakshmana Manikya. The expedition consisted of the forces of Mirza Nuruddin, Mirza Isfandiyar, Haji Shamsuddin Baghdadi, Khwaja Asl, Adil Beg and Mirza Beg, in addition to 500 members of the Subahdar's cavalry. Khan appointed Shaykh Abdul Wahid as the main commander of the entire expedition, which in total was made up 50 elephants, 3000 matchlockers and 4000 cavalry. Ananta Manikya set up defences around Bhulua with the Magh Raja's assistance, before proceeding forward to the Dakatia banks where he built a fort. The Mughals reached the fort in a few days, and a battle commenced resulting in a number of deaths on both sides. Manikya's forces also planned a surprise attack at night. The chief minister of Bhulua, Mirza Yusuf Barlas, surrendered to the Mughal forces and was rewarded by Abdul Wahid as a mansabdar of 500 soldiers and 300 horses. After losing Barlas however, Manikya did not surrender and rather retreated to Bhulua at midnight to strengthen the fort there. News of the retreat reached the Mughals two pahars later, and so they began following Manikya's forces. Having no time to defend themselves, Manikya retreated further to seek refuge with King Min Razagyi of Arakan but was defeated at the banks of the Feni River. The Mughals seized all of Manikya's elephants, and Abdul Wahid successfully took control of Bhulua. Bhulua was subsequently added the Mughal sarkar of Sonargaon.

The Bishwambhar Sur dynasty were ultimately reduced to feudal landowners under Mughal vassalage. In the early seventeenth century, Yashodhar Manikya of Tripura led a raid against the Bhulua kings, which ultimately resulted in a heavy defeat. In 1661, Dutch sailors shipwrecked at Bhulua were cared for by the rulers of Bhulua. A Mughal document from 1782 mentions Raja Kirti Narayan as the Zamindar of Bhulua and Bijay Narayan as the Zamindar of Kudwah-Bhulua. Six years later, a part of the Bhulua estate was sold to Ganga Govinda Singh, the zamindar of Paikpara. In 1833, the entire estate was sold due to arrears and later purchased by Dwarkanath Tagore who eventually sold it to Rani Katyayani of Paikpara. In the twentieth century, John Webster mentioned that there were people in Srirampur that kept the name "Sur", denoting a relation to the erstwhile Bishwambhar Sur dynasty.

== See also ==
- History of Noakhali
