= Mohammad Ruhul Amin =

Freedom fighter of the Bangladesh Liberation War who received the title of Bir Shreshtho

Mohammad Ruhul Amin Bir Sreshtho
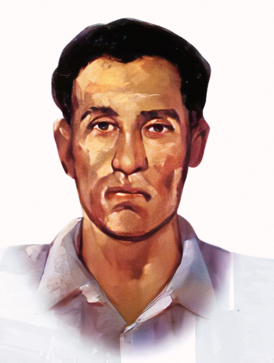
- Engine Room Artificer Mohammad Ruhul Amin Bir Sreshtha
- Native name: মোহাম্মদ রুহুল আমিন
- Born: 5 June 1935; Sonaimuri, Bengal, British India
- Died: 10 December 1971 (aged 36) Rupsha River, Khulna, Bangladesh
- Allegiance: Pakistan (before 1971); Bangladesh
- Branch: Pakistan Navy; Bangladesh Navy
- Service years: 1953 - 1971
- Rank: Engine Room Artificer
- Known for: Freedom Fighter
- Conflicts: Bangladesh Liberation War †
- Awards: Bir Sreshtho
- Children: 5

Mohammad Ruhul Amin BS (Bengali: মোহাম্মদ রুহুল আমিন; June 5, 1935 – 10 December 1971) was an engine room artificer in the Bangladesh Navy who was posthumously awarded Bangladesh's highest military award, Bir Sreshtho, for his service and bravery during the Liberation War.

He was killed on 10 December 1971 while on board BNS Palash, which was mistakenly bombed and sunk by Indian Air Force fighter jets in a friendly fire incident during the advance on Khulna. After swimming ashore, he was captured and killed by local Razakar collaborators of the Pakistan Army.

== Early life ==
Ruhul Amin was born in 1935 in Bagpanchra, Sonaimuri Upazila, Noakhali district. His father was Mohammad Azhar Patwari and his mother was Zulekha Khatun.

== Involvement in the Liberation War ==
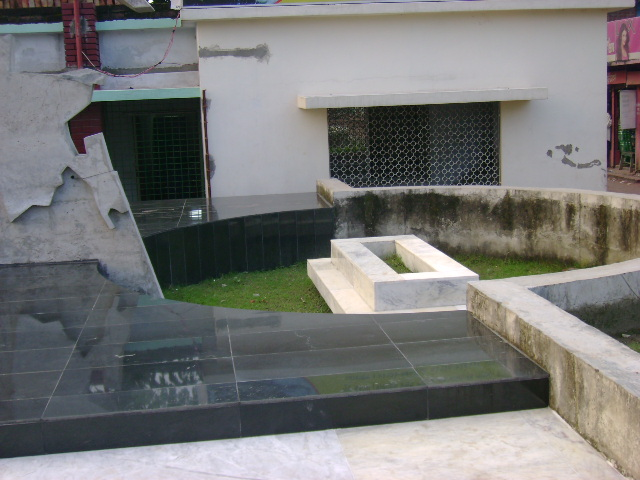
Ruhul Amin's tomb

At the start of Bangladesh Liberation War with Operation Searchlight, Amin immediately resigned from the Pakistan Navy, left PNS Comilla at Chittagong, and returned to his village. He organized local youths and soldiers for the war. In May, he along with 500 others joined Sector-3 under Major K M Shafiullah. Later he was posted as Engine Room Artificer on BNS Palash, serving in the small gunboat force that operated BNS Padma and Palash during the Liberation War.

On 10 December 1971, during the concluding days of the Bangladesh Liberation War, an incident occurred at the Rupsha river in Khulna. In a successful campaign of the allied Bangladesh and Indian naval forces, after freeing Jessore, the ships were advancing towards capturing the Titumir naval base from the Pakistan Navy. As they crossed the Rupsha River near the Khulna shipyard, the two Mukti Bahini gunboats, BNS Padma and BNS Palash, spotted three Folland Gnat fighter aircraft of the Indian Air Force circling overhead. Operating under the joint Allied Command, the commanding officers, certain that the planes were friendly, ordered the crews not to engage. However, due to a severe breakdown in communication between the ground and air commands, the IAF pilots mistook the converted gunboats for enemy vessels and began rocket runs on the ships. Ruhul Amin was working as an artificer of Palash. Both ships caught fire. As a result of heavy bombing, the engine room in the warship caught fire and in a bid to save the ship, Ruhul Amin tried to extinguish it, ignoring orders to abandon the ship. But the engine room was under fire again and another shell exploded which injured Ruhul Amin which convinced him to abandon the ship. He jumped into the water and swam ashore to the eastern bank of the Rupsha River, where he was captured, tortured, and killed with bayonets by waiting Razakar collaborators.He jumped into the water and swam ashore but was attacked and killed with bayonets by the awaiting Razakars.

On the next day, Ruhul Amin along with Mohibullah was buried by the local people at Bagmara village in East Rupsha area in the district.

== Legacy ==
Ro-ro ferry Bir Shreshtha Ruhul Amin was named after him. The Bangladesh Navy warship BNS Shaheed Ruhul Amin is named after him. Bir Shrestha Ruhul Amin Sarani is a road in Saidpur Cantonment, Saidpur, Nilphamari which is named after him. Until 2005, Bir Shrestho Flight Lieutenant Matiur Rahman Cricket Stadium in Chittagong was named after him.

He had three daughters and two sons.
