= Bir Sreshtho =

Highest military award of Bangladesh

Bir Sreshtho (BS)

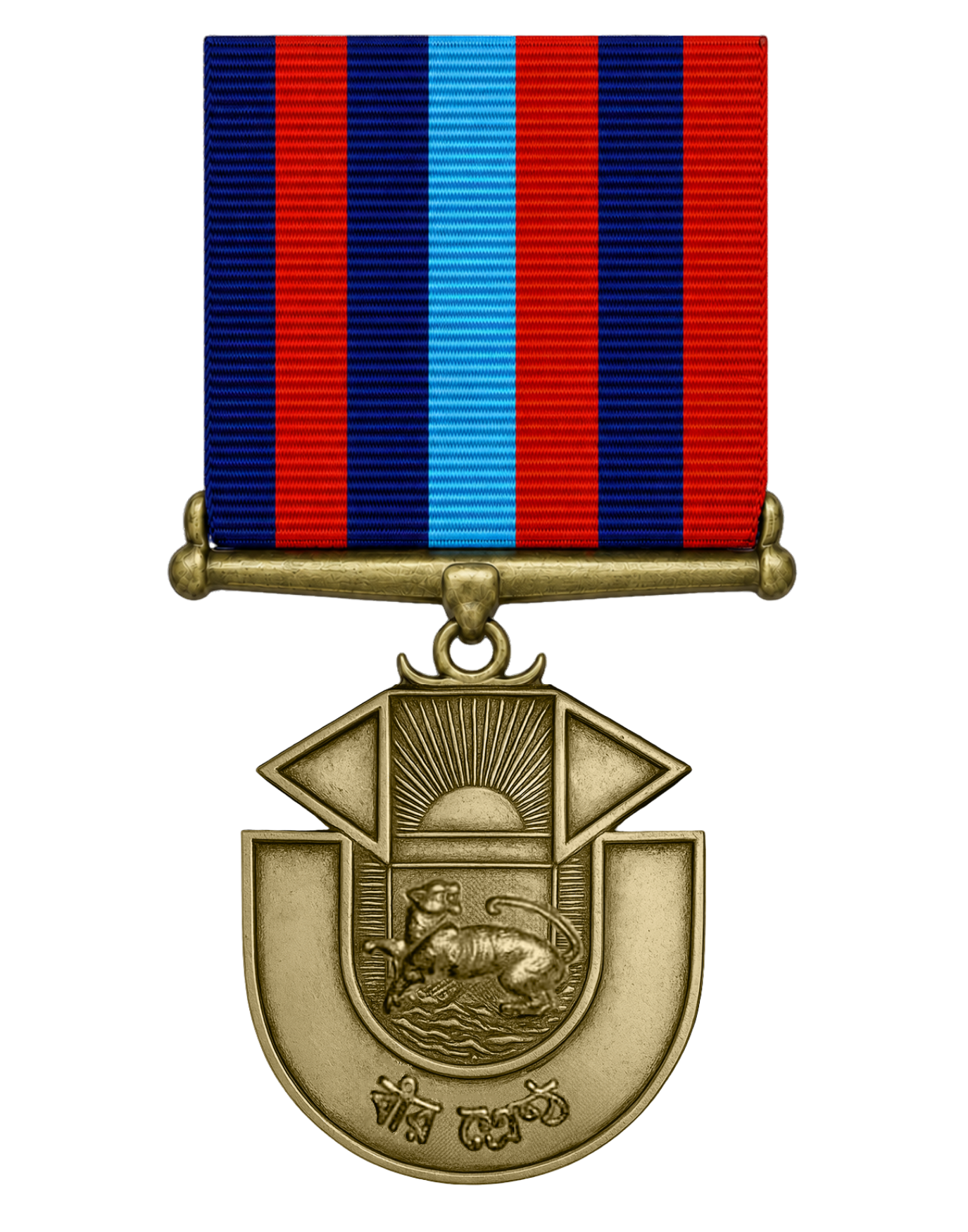
- Bir Shrestha Medal
- Type: Military medal
- Awarded for: Bravery dedication of life to save the motherland. To those who have performed acts of greatest heroism or most conspicuous courage in circumstances of extreme danger and have shown bravery of the highest order or devotion to the country, in the presence of the enemy on land, at sea or in the air to save the motherland.
- Description: Bir Sreshtho (The Most Valiant Hero)
- Presented by: Bangladesh
- Eligibility: Military only (Conferrable on all ranks).
- Status: Awarded by the Bangladesh Gazette 15 December 1973
- Established: 1973
- First award: 15 December 1973

Highlights
- Total: 7
- Total awarded posthumously: 7
- Total recipients: 7 fighters of the Bangladesh Liberation War
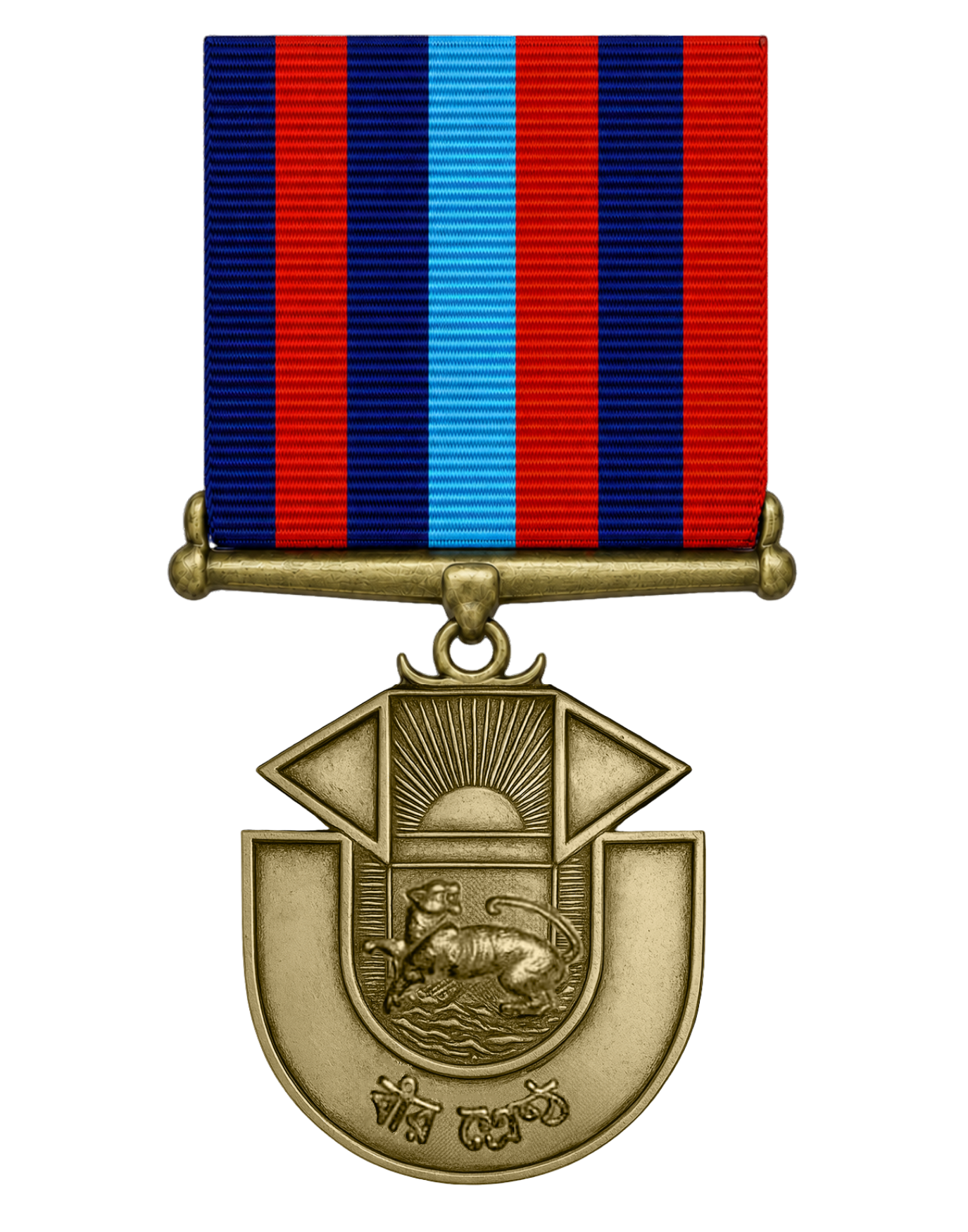
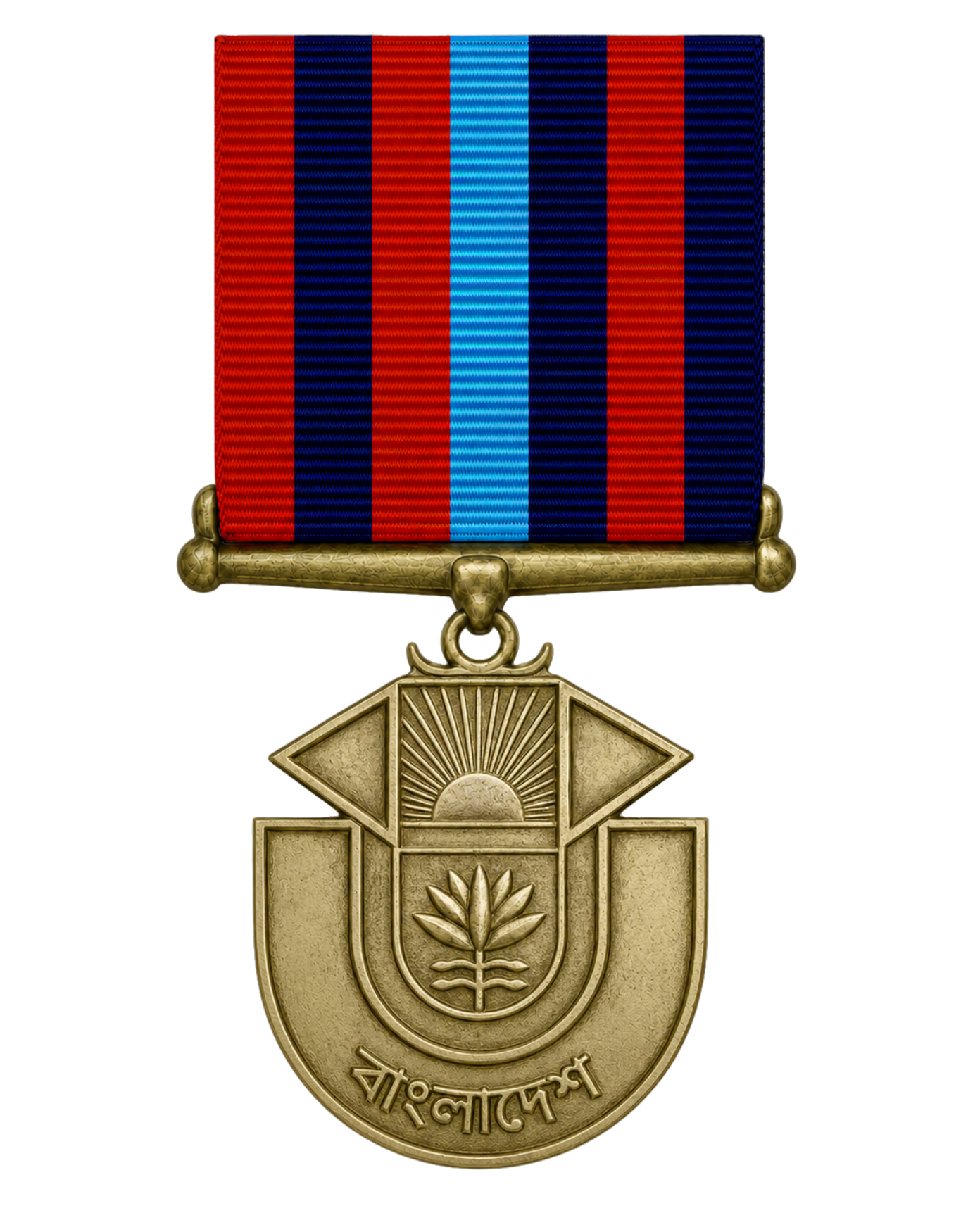

Precedence
- Next (higher): None
- Equivalent: Bir Sorbottam
- Individual equivalent: 7
- Next (lower): Bir Uttom

The Bir Sreshtho (Bengali: বীরশ্রেষ্ঠ; lit. 'The Most Valiant Hero') is the highest military award of Bangladesh. It was awarded to seven freedom fighters who showed utmost bravery and died in action for their nation. They are considered martyrs.

The other three gallantry awards are named, in decreasing order of importance, Bir Uttom, Bir Bikrom and Bir Protik. All of these awards were introduced immediately after the Liberation War in 1971.

== Recipients of the Bir Srestho ==
All the recipients of this award were killed in action during the Liberation War of 1971. The award was published by the Bangladesh Gazette on 15 December 1973. It is the highest military award of Bangladesh, similar to the American Medal of Honor or the British Victoria Cross. It has only been given in 1973 to seven people. Listed below are the people who have received the Bir Srestho. They are all considered 'Shaheed' (Martyrs).

=== Bangladesh Army ===
Serial No.	ID Number & Rank	Name
1	BSS-10439 Captain	Mohiuddin Jahangir
2	3943014 Sepoy	Hamidur Rahman
3	3937798 Sepoy	Muhammad Mustafa Kamal

=== Bangladesh Navy ===
Serial No.	ID Number & Rank	Name
4	62066 Engine Room Artificer, Class-1	Mohammad Ruhul Amin

=== Bangladesh Air Force ===
Serial No.	ID Number & Rank	Name
5	Pak/4367 Flight Lieutenant	Matiur Rahman

=== Border Guard Bangladesh ===
Serial No.	ID Number & Rank	Name
6	Lance Naik	Munshi Abdur Rouf
7	9459 Lance Naik	Noor Mohammad Sheikh

Note: When referring to martyrs, the word 'shaheed' is often put before each individual's name as a mark of respect. The list has been prepared like the declaration by the Bangladesh Gazette.

== See also ==
- Bir Uttom
- Bir Bikrom
- Bir Protik
- Medals of the Bangladesh Armed Forces
