= Mirza Baqi =

Mughal general

Mirza Baqi Baig

Thanadar of Bhalwa
- In office 1624
- Monarch: Jahangir
- Governor: Ibrahim Khan Fath-i-Jang
- Preceded by: Sarhad Khan

Mirza Baqi (Persian: میرزا باقی, Bengali: মীর্জা বাকী), also known as Mirza Baqi Beg, was a 17th-century Mughal Empire military general. He served as thanadar in Phuldubi (near Faridpur) and Bhalwa (Noakhali).

== Career ==
Under the orders of Qasim Khan Chishti, Mirza Baqi joined the expedition to and conquest of Katghar led by General Abdul Nabi.

Baqi was the Bakhshi (paymaster) of Ibrahim Khan Fath-i-Jang. When Khan received news that the Burmese had invaded Arakan, he ordered Baqi to guard the river on their side. Baqi was granted the command of 600 war boats to do so. Within 45 minutes after the evening, Baqi set off with his fleet to Jahangirnagar (Dhaka) and arrived just after midnight. The other generals caught up to Baqi in the early morning.

Ibrahim Khan later sent Mirza Baqi and Raja Raghunath to the Ghalwapara fort near Khanpur river with a fleet of 100 war-boats to safely escort the leftover troops of Sarhad Khan and Shaykh Kamal. After persuading Mirza Nathan to join them, Baqi and his comrades set off on an expedition to Hajo where they met up with Qulij Khan. However, Nathan later fell into argument with Shaykh Kamal again, and so Baqi and Raghunath returned to Jahangirnagar (Dhaka) with no participation in the planned capture of Bhabachan.

When Ibrahim Khan set off on a journey to Akbarnagar (Rajmahal), he appointed Baqi as the Thanadar of Phuldubi with 1000 armed Mughal soldiers in his command. Khan died at this time, and some of his soldiers were sent to Baqi at Phuldubi.

When Prince Shah Jahan arrived in Jahangirnagar in 1624, he appointed Baqi as the Thanadar of Bhalwa (present-day greater Noakhali) and made him a mansabdar of 500 soldiers and 400 horses. In 1625, the Arakanese king Thiri Thudhamma defeated Baqi in Bhalwa, and returned to Arakan with a lot of war booty.

== Views ==
At the newly conquered Ghalwapara fort near Khanpur river, Baqi and Raja Raghunath were ordered by Ibrahim Khan Fath-i-Jang to inform Mirza Nathan that he was to follow the orders of Shaykh Kamal and Sarhad Khan. When they met with each other at an assembly, Nathan was very hospitable to Baqi. They later went into a private chamber where Baqi informed Nathan what he must do. Nathan was heavily offended by what he saw as subservience, and boasted of his efforts regarding the defeat of numerous Baro-Bhuiyan chieftains in Bengal. In response, Baqi mocked his efforts and referred to the Ghalwapara rebels as a "band of fishermen".

== See also ==
- History of Noakhali
