= Munshi Abdur Rouf =

Bangladeshi freedom fighter and recipient of Bir Sreshtho award

Munshi Abdur Rouf Bir Sreshtho
- মুন্সী আবদুর রউফ
- Born: 8 May 1943; Faridpur, Bengal, British India
- Died: 20 April 1971 (aged 27); Rangamati, Chittagong, Bangladesh
- Military career
- Allegiance: Bangladesh; Pakistan (Before 1971)
- Branch: East Pakistan Rifles
- Service years: 8 May 1963 – 20 April 1971
- Rank: Lance Nayek
- Units: Sector - I
- Conflicts: Bangladesh Liberation War †
- Awards: Bir Sreshtho

Munshi Abdur Rouf BS (Bengali: মুন্সী আবদুর রউফ; 8 May 1943 – 20 April 1971) was a Lance Nayek in the 11th Wing (at present 11 BGB situated in Naikhongchari, Bandarban) of East Pakistan Rifles during the Bangladesh Liberation War. He enlisted in the East Pakistan Rifles on 8 May 1963 and was attached to a regular infantry unit during the War of Liberation. Rouf died on 8 April 1971 at Burighat in the Chittagong Hill Tracts after causing extensive damage to the Pakistani Army with his machine gun and forcing them to retreat. He was buried at Naniarchor Upazila in Rangamati District.

He was awarded Bir Sreshtho, which is the highest recognition of bravery in Bangladesh.

== Early life ==
Munshi Abdur Rouf was born on 8 May 1943 at Salamatpur village (renamed Rouf Nagar) under Boalmari thana (currently Madhukhali thana) in Faridpur District. His father, Munshi Mehedi Hossain, was an "imam" at a local mosque, and his mother was Mukidunnesa. He had two sistersl their names were Zahura and Hazera. After his father's death in 1955, Rouf had to stop his education at the eighth grade. He joined the East Pakistan Rifles on 8 May 1963. He had to increase his age three years to get the job. After the preliminary training at the EPR camp at Chuadanga, Rouf went to West Pakistan to receive advanced training. He was appointed to Comilla after 6 months. On 25 March 1971, he was in 11 Wing of EPR (at present 11 BGB situated in Naikhongchari, Bandarban) Chittagong.

== Death ==
The East Bengal Regiment wanted to restrict the Pakistani Army from using the Rangamati-Mahalchari waterway. Thus, they camped at both of the Chengi Lakes at Burighat. Rouf was serving as a soldier in this company. To prevent the Pakistani Army from using the Rangamati-Mahalchari waterway, the regiment constructed a camp on both sides.

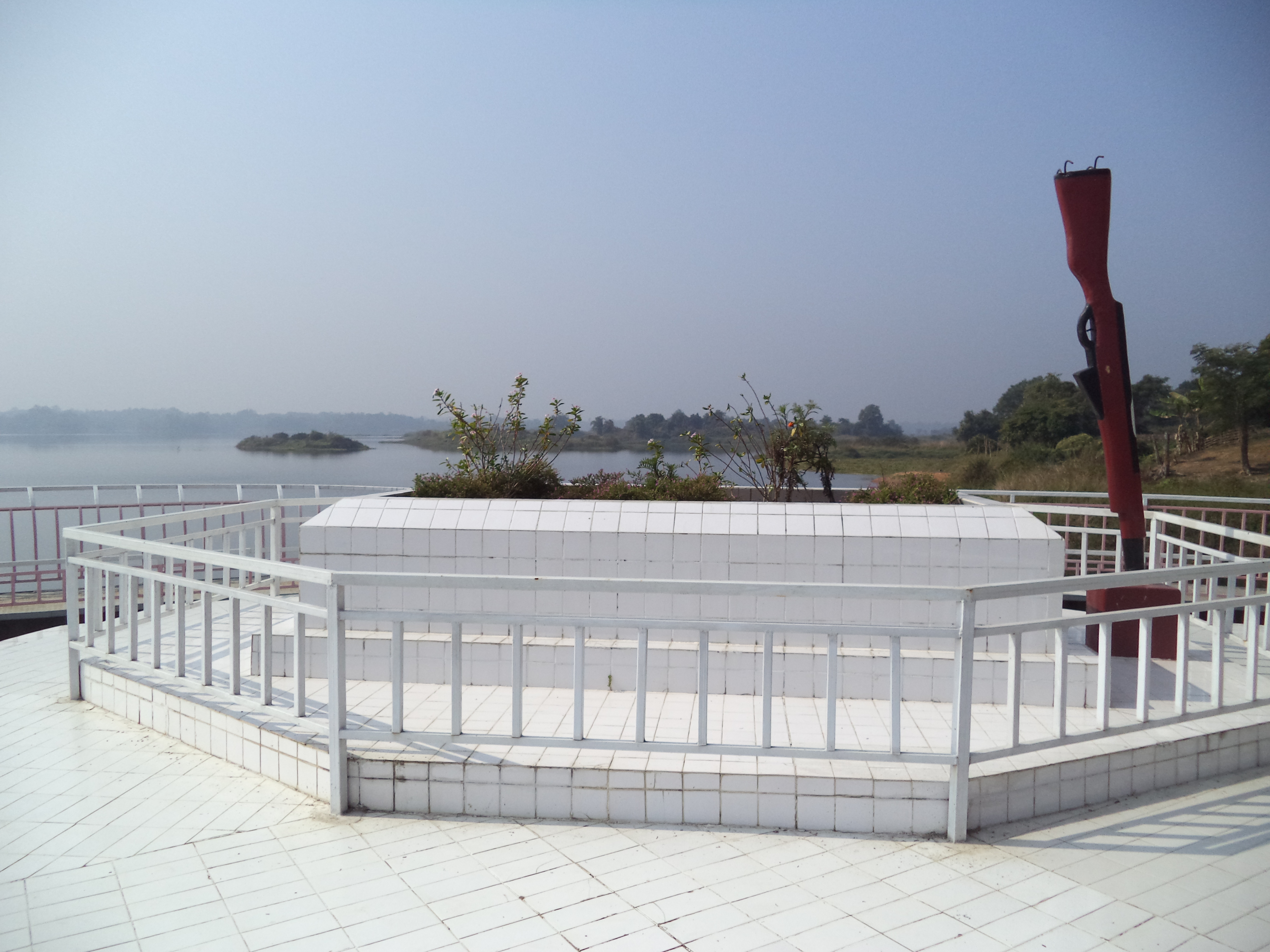
Rouf's grave at Burighat, Naniarchar, Rangamati

On 20 April 1971, the Pakistani Army attacked the Mukti Bahini's defensive position with 7 speed boats and 2 launches. Their mission was to drive the Mukti Bahini away from the waterways of Rangamati and Mohalchari. Pakistani forces managed to disorient Mukti Bahini by coming closer to them and firing heavily. In the meantime, Pakistanis surrounded the freedom fighters and managed to isolate nearly 100 of them. There positions were given away by Chakma youth who acted spies for the Razakar forces.

Rouf realised the threat to the entire company. So, he crawled forward to his trench and continuously fired towards the enemies with his automatic machine gun, managing to sink all 7 speedboats. As a result, the Pakistani launches retreated to a safer position and resumed firing from there. A mortar hit Rouf directly, and he was immediately killed. Rouf's valiant effort helped his company to survive, as his act saved nearly 150 soldiers of the Mukti Bahini on that day.

== Legacy ==
Bangladesh Rifles College was renamed Bir Shrestha Munshi Abdur Rouf Public College in Pilkhana in 2014. A monument for Rouf was built by Engineering Construction Battalion (ECB-16) at Shalbagan, midpoint of the Chittagong-Rangamati road, Sapchhari. A high school in Manikchari Muslim Para, Mahalchhari, Khagrachari has been named after him. A cricket stadium has been named in Sylhet after him. A college in Faridpur was named after him, which was nationalised by the government.

== Gallery ==
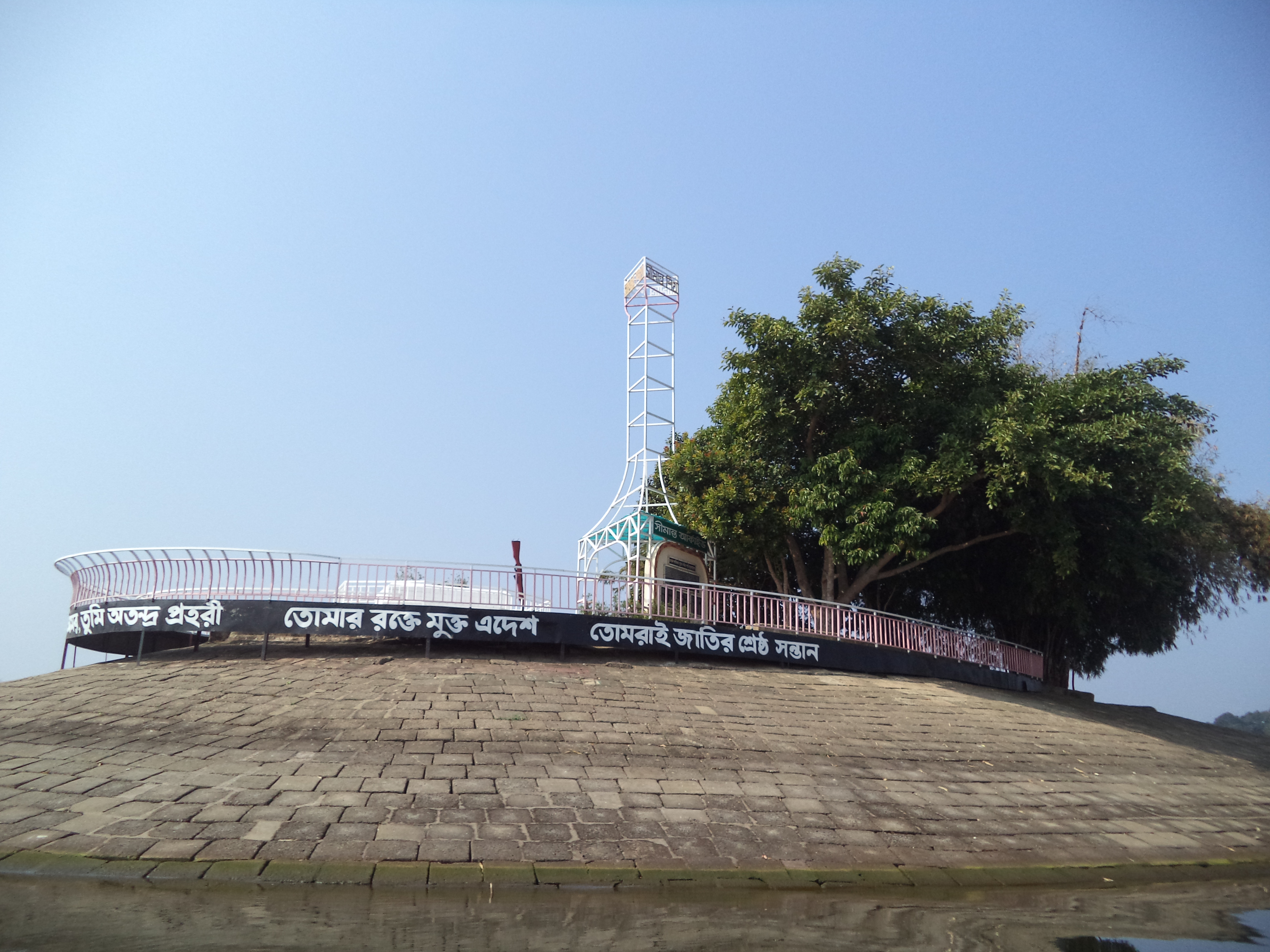
Shahid Lance Naik Munshi Abdur Rouf Bir Shreshtho Mausoleum at Burighat, Naniarchar, Rangamati-View from North

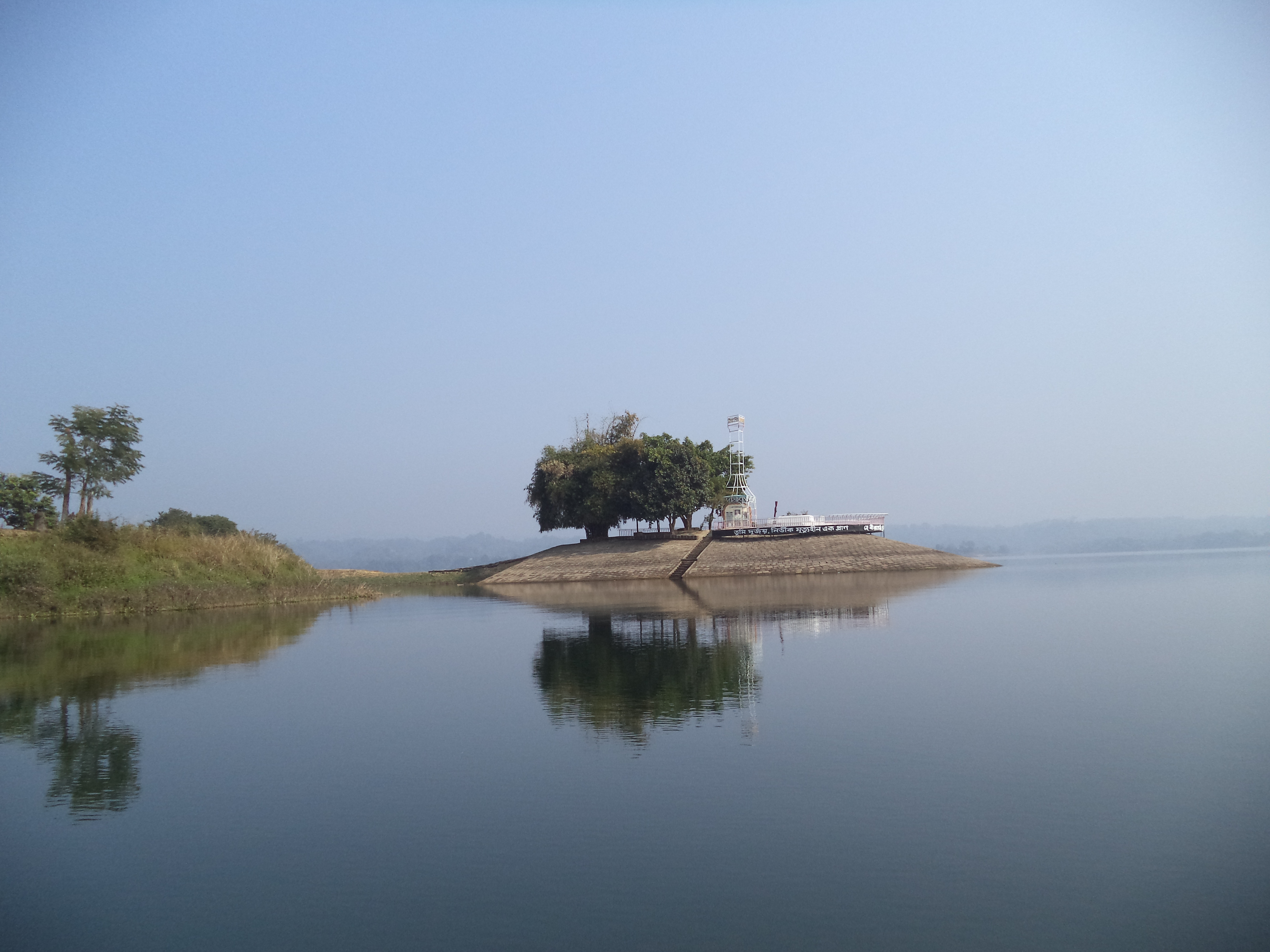
Shahid Lance Naik Munshi Abdur Rouf Bir Shreshtho Mausoleum at Burighat, Naniarchar, Rangamati-View of island from North
