= Gul Bakhsh =

19th-century Bengali poet

- গুল বখশ
- Occupation: Writer
- Notable work: Kukikatar Puthi

Gul Bakhsh (Bengali: গুল বখশ, romanized: gul bôkhsh) was a Bengali poet of the late 19th century. He is mainly known for his magnum opus, Kukikatar Puthi, which was a narrative of the Kuki raids at Chhagalnaiya in 1860. It was written in the puthi format.

His puthi was featured on the Paschimbanga Bangla Akademi Magazine in 1375 B.S. (c. 1969 CE). One 80-year old incomplete manuscript (pages 3 to 17) is preserved at the Puthi Library of the University of Dhaka. Another incomplete manuscript (pages 4 to 17) is preserved at the Central Bengali Development Board.

== See also ==
- History of Noakhali
