= Sonaimuri Upazila =

Sonaimuri সোনাইমুড়ী
- Upazila
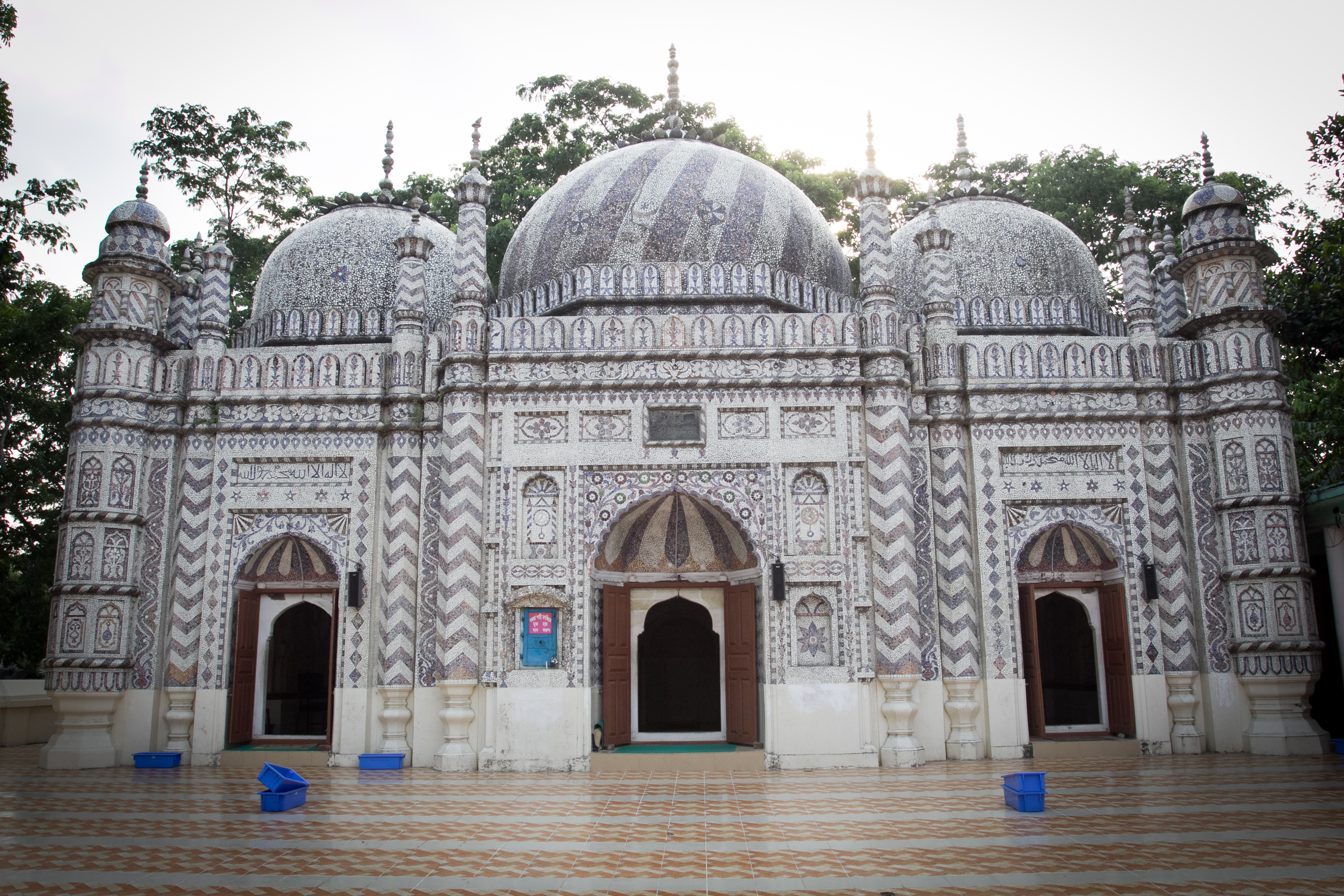
- Bajra Shahi Mosque

- Coordinates: 23°2.3′N 91°6.5′E
- Country: Bangladesh
- Division: Chittagong Division
- District: Noakhali District

Government
  - MP (Noakhali-1): none

Area
  - Total: 169.14 km^{2} (65.31 sq mi)

Population (2022)
  - Total: 368,842
  - Density: 2,180.7/km^{2} (5,648.0/sq mi)
- Time zone: UTC+6 (BST)
- Postal code: 3827
- Website: sonaimuri.noakhali.gov.bd(in Bengali)

Sonaimuri (সোনাইমুড়ী) is a newly established upazila or sub-district in Noakhali District, Bangladesh. It consists of ten union councils or parishads - Ambarnagar, Amisha Para, Bazra, Deoti, Jayag, Nadana, Nateshwar, Sonaimuri, Sonapur and Baragaon. Sonaimuri was declared as an upazila in response to a popular demand in 2005. The area of Sonaimuri is 169.14 km^{2} while its population is 368,842. People in this upazila is generally solvent and engaged in business and agriculture.

Sonaimuri Upazila mauza geocode map

== Points of interest ==
- Bajra Shahi Mosque, built in 1741–42, is the area's most important historical monument and is on the government Department of Archaeology's list of protected sites. Rectangular in plan, it has three domes, the middle one larger than those on either side, and octagonal towers at the four corners. Decorated between 1911 and 1928, it is covered in mosaics made from colored shards of ceramic.
- Joyag: During Mahatma Gandh's visit to some parts of Noakhali in January 1947, Hemanta Kumar Ghosh, a local zamindar, donated his property for setting up the Ambika-Kaliganga Charitable Trust, which later on became famous as Gandhi Ashram. Every morning and evening, people gather for a prayer meeting in a room which still contains mementos of Gandhi's visit here in January 1947.

== Administration ==
Sonaimuri Upazila is divided into Sonaimuri Municipality and ten union parishads: Ambarnagr, Amishapara, Bajra, Barogaon, Chashirhat, Deoti, Joyag, Nateshwar, Nodona, and Sonapur. The union parishads are subdivided into 133 mauzas and 148 villages.

Sonaimuri Municipality is subdivided into 9 wards and 18 mahallas.

=== Chairmen ===
List of chairmen
Name	Notes
AFM Babul Babu
Khandakar Al-Amin Hirapuri	Present

== Demographics ==
Religions in Sonaimuri Upazila (2022)
Religion	Percent
Islam	97.36%
Hinduism	2.58%
Other or not stated	0.06%

According to the 2022 Bangladeshi census, Sonaimuri Upazila had 79,382 households and a population of 368,842. 10.84% of the population were under 5 years of age. Sonaimuri had a literacy rate (age 7 and over) of 81.82%: 82.39% for males and 81.36% for females, and a sex ratio of 84.16 males for every 100 females. 53,151 (14.41%) lived in urban areas.

According to the 2011 Census of Bangladesh, Sonaimuri Upazila had 60,542 households and a population of 327,194. 82,092 (25.09%) were under 10 years of age. Sonaimuri had a literacy rate (age 7 and over) of 61.02%, compared to the national average of 51.8%, and a sex ratio of 1185 females per 1000 males. 34,218 (10.46%) lived in urban areas.

== Education ==
Sonaimuri Govt. High School is an historical school of this upazila. It played an important role in spreading education among all strata of the society from British days. Historically, students of this school in the past contributed to the liberation struggle against British colonial rule. Other important schools include Amishapara M.k High School, Sonapur Ali Akber High school, Rashidpur High School, Mahbubennesa Girls' High School, Bajra High School, Kalikapur High School, Rubirhat Banghabondhu High School, Nandia Para High School, Vir Srasto Ruhul Amin Academy, Jaiag High School, Nodona High School, Sonaimuri Girls School, and Sonaimuri Hamedia alia (kamil) Madrassah. Sonaimuri College, Abirpara High School etc. provide a direct path to higher education from high schools in this upazila.

== Notable residents ==
- Kamrul Ahsan, Former Ambassador of Bangladesh to Russia, Canada and Singapore and Former Secretary to the Government.
- Bir Sreshtho Mohammad Ruhul Amin, engine room artificer in the Bangladesh Navy
- Ahmad Nazir, journalist, writer, former Member of Parliament member and Director-General of Shilpakala Academy
