= Bajra Shahi Mosque =

Mosque in Bazra, Sonaimuri, Noakhali, Bangladesh

- বজরা শাহী মসজিদ
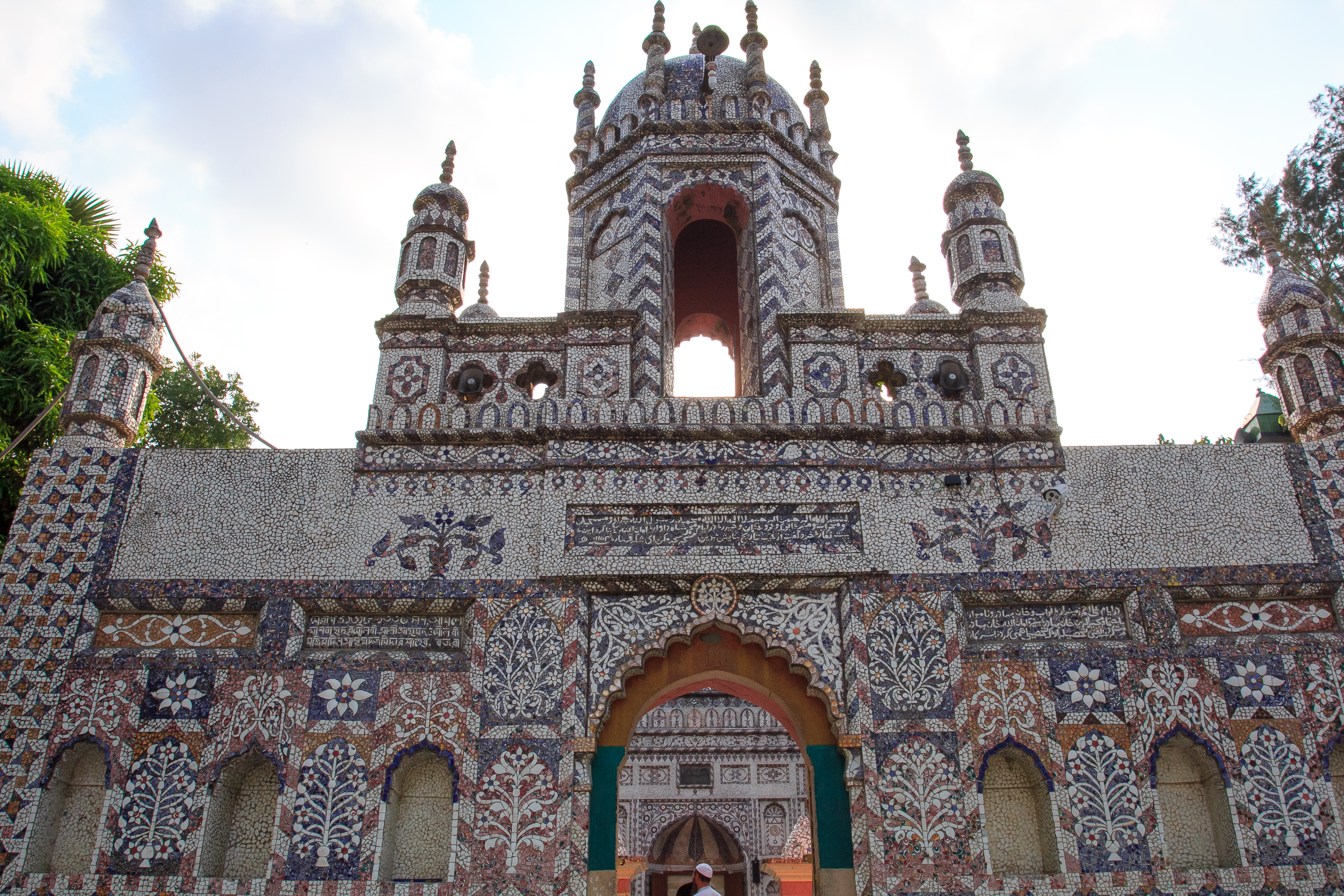
- The gateway in the outer wall, decorated with mosaics

- Location of the mosque in Bangladesh

Religion
- Affiliation: Islam
- Ecclesiastical or organisational status: Mosque
- Status: Active

Location
- Location: Bazra, Sonaimuri, Noakhali District, Chittagong Division
- Country: Bangladesh
- Administration: Department of Archaeology
- Coordinates: 23°00′14″N 91°05′35″E

Architecture
- Type: Mosque architecture

Specifications
- Dome: Three
- Minaret: Four

The Bajra Shahi Mosque (Bengali: বজরা শাহী মসজিদ, romanized: Bojra Shahi Mosjid, Arabic: شاهي مسجد بجرا) is an 18th-century mosque located in the Bazra Union under Sonaimuri Upazila of Noakhali District, in the Chattogram Division of Bangladesh. It was described as the "most notable historical monument" in the area around Maijdee.

== Location ==
The mosque is located in a rural setting 20 kilometres (12 mi) north of Noakhali, at the village of Bazra. The site is enclosed by an outer wall with an ornate gateway on the east, the whole situated on high ground on the western side of a dighi or reservoir.

== History ==
The mosque was built by Aman Ullah in 1741-42 during the reign of the Mughal emperor Muhammad Shah. Between 1911 and 1928, Bazra zamindars Khan Bahadur Ali Ahmad and Khan Bahadur Mujir Uddin Ahmad had it extensively repaired and decorated with mosaics made from colored shards of ceramic. It is in a fairly good state of preservation, and is on the Bangladeshi Department of Archaeology list of protected sites.

== Architecture ==
The mosque is rectangular in plan. It has three domes, the middle one larger than those on either side, and octagonal towers at the four corners. The eastern facade has three doorways, the central one larger than the others, each projecting from the facade, opening under a half-domed vault, and flanked by slender minarets. The north and south sides each have a similar doorway.

The interior is divided into three bays by two multi-cusped arches.

== Gallery ==
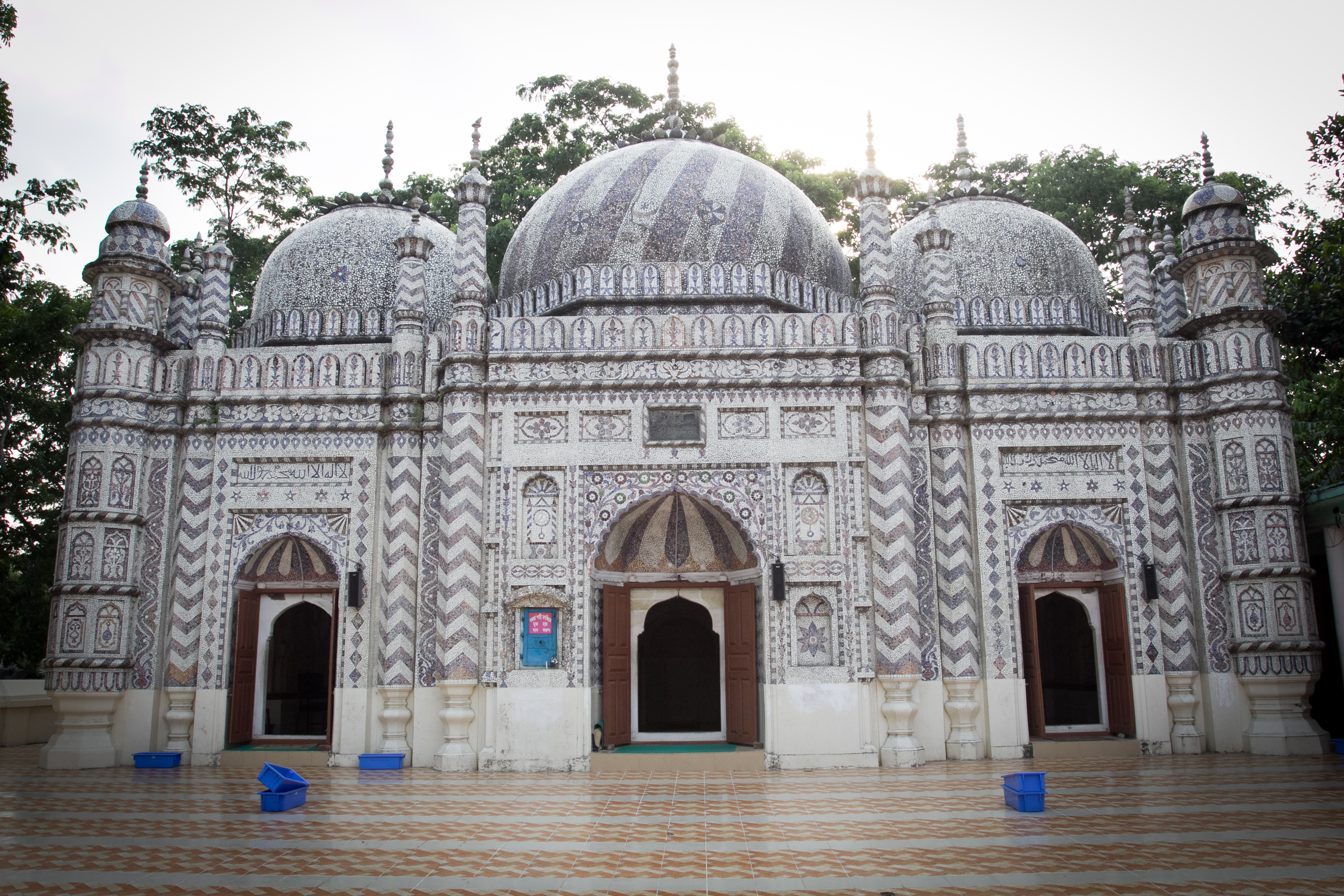
The eastern façade has three doorways, each opening under a half-domed vault and flanked by slender minarets

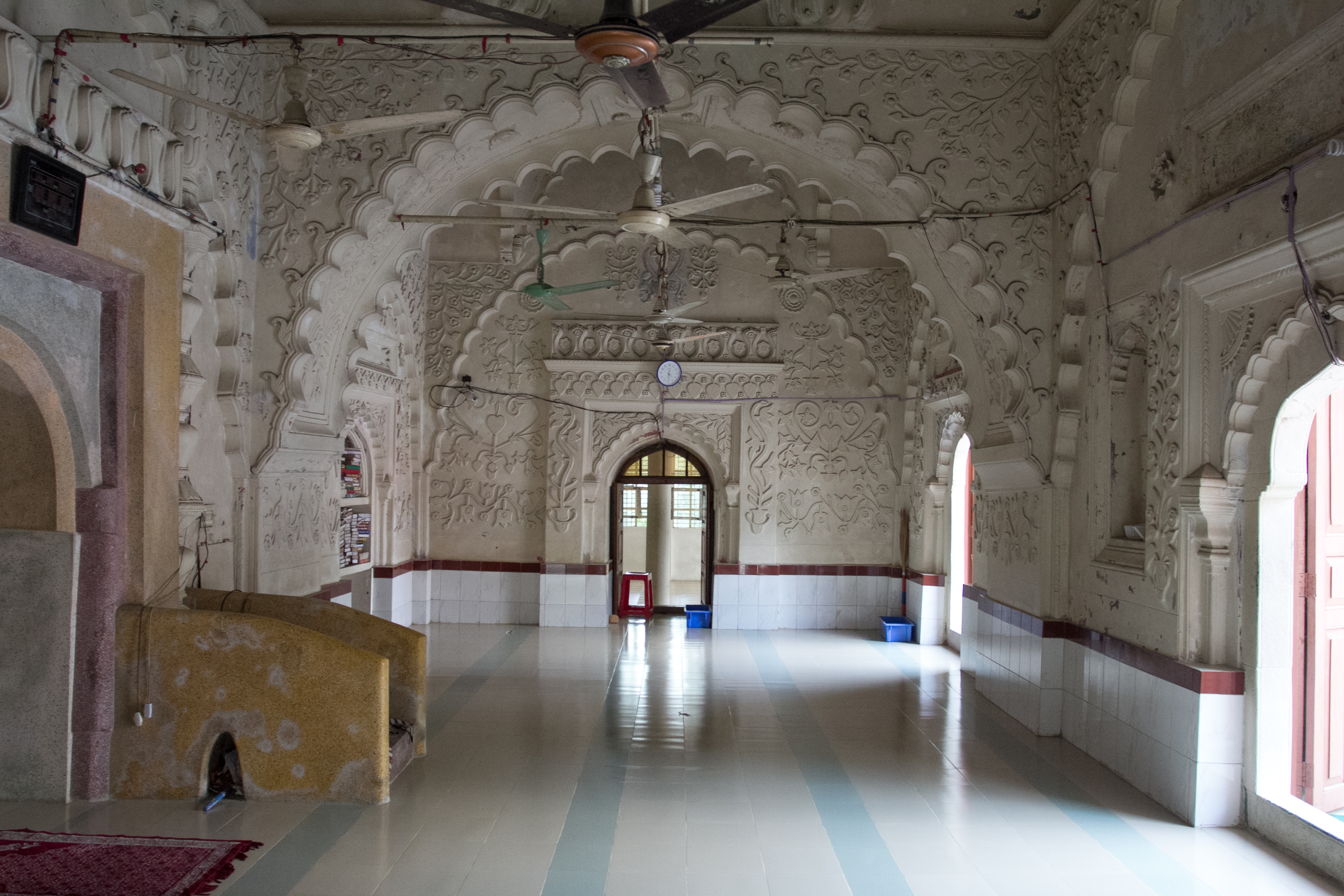
Multi-cusped arches divide the interior into three bays

== See also ==
- Islam in Bangladesh
- List of mosques in Bangladesh
