= Engine room artificer =

Engineering personnel flash of the Irish Naval Service.

Engine room artificer (ERA) is a specialised position in the crews of naval vessels – especially those of the British Royal Navy (RN) and other Commonwealth navies. An ERA is usually a fitter and turner, boilermaker, coppersmith or enginesmith. On larger vessels, there are several ERAs, divided into three or more classes. Each of these positions is normally associated with a specific non-commissioned rank and level of experience – for example, an ERA (First Class) is normally a chief petty officer (CPO). The designation ERA was introduced in the early days of steam-powered warships, and in most navies is now obsolete.

Usually working under an engineer officer, an ERA was able to read and write, competent in the workings of engines and boilers, and trained in the maintenance and operation and uses of all parts of marine engines. ERAs were the senior maintainers and operators of all warship mechanical plant. From about 1916, ERAs could also be placed in charge of small ships as an engineering officer and were also EOs of the watch on destroyers and below for which they received rapid advancement to CPO and extra charge pay of 1/- (one shilling) per day on attaining their "ticket"

By the 1950s, the RN used the term ERA for apprentice-trained boilermakers, coppersmiths, fitters and turners; however, boilermaker and coppersmith skills were becoming redundant and the remaining trades, fitters, turners and metalworkers, together with shipwrights and mechanicians, were expanded by cross-training to undertake most operational maintenance and the running of all mechanical equipment, including steam, diesel and gas turbine main machinery. During the same period, ERAs spent their first 16 months (four terms) at HMS Fisgard in Torpoint, Cornwall, and the next eight terms at HMS Caledonia in Rosyth, Fife before completing their fifth year at sea or in dockyards with the fleet. During this long training time their duties with the RN often moved beyond the world of engineering and into the world of combat and leadership.

In the 1960s, as an increasing number of nuclear-powered submarines came into service with the RN, nuclear technicians were included in the ranks of ERAs. Later in that decade, to better represent the range of technical abilities of ERAs, the name of the appointment was changed to Marine Engineering Artificer (MEA). For example, a nuclear technician became an MEA (P), for "propulsion". An MEA was a qualified technician with an in-depth knowledge of a wider range of equipment, including the main engines, engine room, auxiliary propulsion equipment, and calibration of electronic and mechanical gauges and other measuring equipment.

The Irish Naval Service continues to use the term Engine Room Artificer for marine technicians, who wear a distinctive insignia.
