= Pahar =

Unit of time used in Indian subcontinent

Pahar (Bengali পহর, Hindi/Nepali: पहर, Punjabi: ਪੈਹਰ, Urdu: پہر), which is more commonly pronounced peher (/pɛhɛr/) is a traditional unit of time used in India, Pakistan, and Bangladesh. One pahar nominally equals three hours, and there are eight pahars in a day. In India, the measure is primarily used in North India and by Hindi-speaking communities throughout the Deccan in Southern India.

== Etymology ==
Pahar/pehar/peher is derived from Sanskrit word prahar which is an ancient unit of time in India.

The word pahar/peher has the same root as the Hindustani word pehra (meaning "to stand guard") and pehredar (literally "guard/watchman"). It literally means a "watch" (i.e. period of guard-duty).

== Timing ==
Traditionally, night and day were each allocated four pahars, or "watches." The first pahar of the day (or din pahar) was timed to begin at sunrise, and the first pahar of the night (raat pahar) was timed to begin at sunset.

This meant that in the winter the daytime pahars were shorter than the nighttime pahars, and the opposite was true in summer. The pahars were exactly equal on the equinoxes. Thus, the length of the traditional pahar varied from about 2.5 hours to 3.5 hours in the Indo-Gangetic plains.

Each pahar of a 24-hour day-night cycle has a specific name and number. The first pahar of the day, known as pehla pahar (Hindustani: pehla, lit. 'first'), corresponds to the early morning and sunrise.

The second pahar is called do-pahar (Hindustani: do, lit. 'second'). However, in the common speech of North India, Pakistan and Nepal, dopahar (दोपहर or دوپہر) has now come to be known as the generic term for afternoon or the time after midday, since it begins after completing the do-pahars.

The third pahar is called seh pahar (Persian: seh, lit. 'three') and has generically come to mean evening, though the term is less commonly used than shaam.

== Literature ==
The poet-saint Kabir mentions pahar in one of his dohas:

पाँच पहर धंधे गया, तीन पहर गया सोय ।

एक पहर हरि नाम बिन, मुक्ति कैसे होय ॥

[You] went to work for five pahars, slept for the remaining three pahars. How will you attain salvation without chanting the names of Lord Hari for at least one pahar?
