= Zilla school =

Zilla School or Zila School (lit. 'District School') refers to a number of zila/district-level secondary schools established during the British Raj.

== In Bangladesh ==
Name Of Institute	Established at
Barisal Zilla School	1829
Barguna Zilla School	1927 (As Barguna Middle English School)
Bogra Zilla School	1853
Comilla Zilla School	1837
Dinajpur Zilla School	1854
Faridpur Zilla School	1840 (As English Seminary School)
Jamalpur Zilla School	1881 (As Dono High School)
Jessore Zilla School	1838
Kushtia Zilla School	1961
Khulna Zilla School	1885
Mymensingh Zilla School	1846
Naogaon Zilla School	1917
Noakhali Zilla School	1850
Pabna Zilla School	1853
Rangpur Zilla School	1832

== In India ==
Name Of Institute	Established at
Howrah Zilla School	1845 (As Howrah Government School)
Jalpaiguri Zilla School	1876
Malda Zilla School	1858
Bankura Zilla School	1840 (As Bankura Free School)
Purulia Zilla School	1853 (As Purulia High School)
Birbhum Zilla School	1851
Puri Zilla School	1853
Balasore Zilla School	1853
Chandra Sekhar Behera Zilla School, Sambalpur	1850 (As Sambalpur Public School) 1852 (As Sambalpur School) 1864 (As Sambalpur Zilla School)
Arrah Zila School	1853
Ranchi Zilla School	1839
Purnea Zilla School	1853
Jajpur Zilla School, Jajpur	1883
Govt. Zila School, Muzaffarpur	1845
Zila School Gaya	1845
Zila School Chapra	1854
Govt. Intermediate Zila School, Bhagalpur	1823
Zilla School, Bhadrak	1882
