= Kanhaipur =

Kanhaipur or Kanaipur in Bengali can refer to

- Kanhaipur, Uttar Pradesh
- Kanhaipur, East Bengal
- Kanhaipur, West Bengal
