= Syed Hasan Askari =

Indian Islamic scholar (1901–1990)

Khan Sahib Syed Hasan Askari
- Born: 10 April 1901; Khujwa, Siwan district
- Died: 28 November 1990 (aged 89)
- Education: Zila School Chapra (matriculation); Langat Singh College (Bachelors of Arts); Patna University (Masters of Arts)
- Occupation: Historian
- Awards: Ghalib Award (1974); Padma Shri (1985); Maharshi Badrayan Vyas Samman (1978)
- Honours: Khan Sahib (1945); Doctor of Literature by Magadh University (1967); Doctor of Literature by Patna University (1984)

Syed Hasan Askari (born 10 April 1901 – 28 November 1990) was an Indian writer and historian. His literary work was focused on medieval Sufism, the regional history of Bihar, and aspects of cultural history of medieval India. He was recognized by the Government of India.

He authored, edited and translated more than 250 articles, research papers, forewords, prefaces, and book reviews, which have been awarded by the Government of India multiple journals, books and proceedings.

== Early life and education ==
Askari was born to Syed Razi Hasan and Raziat Fatma as the youngest son on 10 April 1901 in Khujwa village of Saran district (now Siwan district), Bihar.

He graduated from Madarsa Islamiya Khujwa and Middle School Siwan in 1916. He passed matriculation from Zila School Chapra in 1918 and graduated with Bachelor of Arts (Honors) from Greer Bhumihar Brahamin College (now Langat Singh College), Muzaffarpur in 1922. He completed Master of Arts from Patna University in 1924.

== Recognition ==
Askari awarded the title of "Khan Saheb" by the British Indian Government in 1945.

Askari was presented the Ghalib Award in 1974 by Fakhruddin Ali Ahmad, then President of India.

Neelam Sanjeeva Reddy presented the Maharshi Badrayan Vyas Samman to Askari, in 1978.

Gyani Zail Singh awarded Padma Shri to Askari in 1985.

== Literary works ==
- Askari, Syed Hasan (1989). Islam and Muslims in Medieval Bihar: Collected Works of Prof. S.H. Askari. Patna: Khuda Baksh Oriental Public Library.
- Lakʹhnavī, Shīv Dās (1974). Askari, Syed Hasan (ed.). تاريخ فرخ سير و اوائل عهد محمد شاه: معروف به شاه نامه منور كلام [History of Farrukh Seer and Early Era of Muhammad Shah: Known as Shah Nama Manwar Kalam] (in Persian). Iqbal Book Depo.
- Askari, Syed Hasan (1996). Hasnain, Syed Mohammad (ed.). Maqalat-e-Syed Hasan Askari (in Urdu). Patna: Bihar Urdu Academy.
- Askari, Syed Hasan (1989). Amir Khusrau as a Historian. Khuda Bakhsh Oriental Public Library.
- Askari, Syed Hasan (1985). Collected Works of Prof. S.H. Askari. Khuda Baksh Oriental Public Library.
- Askari, Syed Hasan (1984). Aspects of the Cultural History of Medieval Bihar. Kashi Prasad Jayswal Research Institute.

=== Articles ===
- Askari, Syed Hasan (1959). "The Mughal-Magh Relations down to the Time of Islām Khan Mashhadi". Proceedings of the Indian History Congress. 22: 201–213. ISSN 2249-1937. JSTOR 44304296.
- Askari, Syed Hasan (1950). "A Fifteenth Century Shuttari Sufi Saint of North Bihar". Proceedings of the Indian History Congress. 13: 148–157. ISSN 2249-1937. JSTOR 44140905.
- Askari, Syed Hasan (1952). "Tazkira-I-Murshidi, a Rare Malfuz of the Fifteenth Century Sufi Saint of Gulbarga". Proceedings of the Indian History Congress. 15: 179–189. ISSN 2249-1937. JSTOR 45436482.
- Askari, S. H. (1955). "Bihar in the Time of the Last Two Lodi Sultans of Delhi". Proceedings of the Indian History Congress. 18: 148–157. ISSN 2249-1937. JSTOR 44137372.
- Askari, Syed Hasan (1949). "FRAGMENTS OF A NEWLY DISCOVERED PERSIAN MANUSCRIPT BY A HINDU NEWSWRITER (Summary)". Proceedings of the Indian History Congress. 12: 270–273. ISSN 2249-1937. JSTOR 44140548.
- Askari, Syed Hasan (1960). "Discursive Notes on the Sharqi Monarchy of Jaunpur". Proceedings of the Indian History Congress. 23: 152–163. ISSN 2249-1937. JSTOR 44304055.
- Askari, Syed Hasan (1945). "Durrani-Rajput Negotiations, 1759-61". Proceedings of the Indian History Congress. 8: 257–269. ISSN 2249-1937. JSTOR 45435425.
- Askari, Syed Hassan; Askari, Syed Hasan (1951). "The Nizam and Cornwallis". Proceedings of the Indian History Congress. 14: 217–224. ISSN 2249-1937. JSTOR 44303971.
- Askari, Syed Hasan (1943). "Bihar During the First Quarter of the Seventeenth Century". Proceedings of the Indian History Congress. 6: 348–353. ISSN 2249-1937. JSTOR 45476186.
- Askari, Syed Hasan (1964). "Historical Matters in Ijaz-I-Khusravi". Proceedings of the Indian History Congress. 26: 11–20. ISSN 2249-1937. JSTOR 44140309.
- Askari, Syed Hasan (1953). "Raja Ram Das Kachhawaha". Proceedings of the Indian History Congress. 16: 251–259. ISSN 2249-1937. JSTOR 44303881.
- Askari, Syed Hasan (1947). "Presidential Address". Proceedings of the Indian History Congress. 10: 330–340. ISSN 2249-1937. JSTOR 44137157.
- Askari, Syed Hasan (1947). "A Contemporary Correspondence Describing the Events at Delhi at the Time of Nadir Shah's Invasion". Proceedings of the Indian History Congress. 10: 357–366. ISSN 2249-1937. JSTOR 44137160.
- Askari, Syed Hasan (1939). "Some Unpublished Letters of Raja Ramnarain Relating to Shah Alam's Invasions of Bihar". Proceedings of the Indian History Congress. 3: 979–1001. ISSN 2249-1937. JSTOR 44252447.
- Askari, Syed Hasan (1961). "Mughal Naval Weakness and Aurangzeb's Attitude Towards the Traders and Pirates on the Western Coast". Proceedings of the Indian History Congress. 24: 162–170. ISSN 2249-1937. JSTOR 44140735.
- Askari, Syed Hasan (1959). "The Mughal-Magh Relations down to the Time of Islām Khan Mashhadi". Proceedings of the Indian History Congress. 22: 201–213. ISSN 2249-1937. JSTOR 44304296.
- Askari, S. H. (1954). "Indo-Persian Political Relations in the Age of the Great Mughals". Proceedings of the Indian History Congress. 17: 297–298. ISSN 2249-1937. JSTOR 45436399.
- Askari, S. H. (1968). "Hunting in India Under the Early Turks". Annals of the Bhandarkar Oriental Research Institute. 48/49: 33–43. ISSN 0378-1143. JSTOR 41694221.

== Academic honors ==
In 1967, Magadh University, Bihar, conferred upon Askari the degree of D. Litt (honoris causa)

In 1984, Patna University, Bihar, conferred upon Askari the degree of D. Litt (honoris causa).

== Personal life ==
Askari married Umme Salma, daughter of Syed Raza Hussain and Sakina Fatima Hussain in 1926. They had 4 daughters and 3 sons together.
