= Kanaipur School & College =

School in Faridpur, Bangladesh

- কানাইপুর স্কুল এন্ড কলেজ
- Seal of Kanaipur School & College
- Former names: Kanaipur High School (কানাইপুর উচ্চ বিদ্যালয়)
- Motto: জ্ঞানই আলো
- Motto in English: Knowledge is Light
- Type: Private
- Established: 1937 AD, Raised to Higher Secondary Level: 2023 AD
- President: Md. Yusuf Ali Molla
- Principal: Shah Mohammad Shahjahan Molla
- Location: Kanaipur, Faridpur, 7801, Bangladesh; 23°32′27.7″N 89°46′09.9″E
- Campus: Rural
- Language: Bangla
- Website: kanaipurschoolandcollege.edu.bd

Kanaipur School & College (Bengali: কানাইপুর স্কুল এন্ড কলেজ) is a secondary school and college located in Kanaipur Union, Sadar Upazila, Faridpur District, Bangladesh. The school was first established in 1937 as Kanaipur High School. The school was upgraded to the higher secondary level on June 7, 2023 and renamed Kanaipur School & College. Bengali is the language of all the institutional activities of the institution. Under the institution there is provision of secondary education for five years at school level and higher secondary education for two years at college level.

== History ==
The school was founded in 1937 by local educationist landlords. Panchanan Roy donated the land for the school on January 2, 1937. Babu Promod Chandra Sikdar was the founding headmaster. The school was recognized as a junior high school in 1962 and as a high school in 1966. In the past, a total of 5 headmasters have served, including Mr. Alhaj Mohammad Afsar Uddin Molla for 41 years.

In 2023, the school was upgraded to the higher secondary level and was inaugurated on June 7 with a renaming to Kanaipur School and College.

== Summary ==
Kanaipur School and College is located in the heart of Kanaipur Union, Sadar Upazila of Faridpur district. It is situated on the east side of the famous market and north side of C & B Road. There is a large playground on the south side of the school. On the south side of the playground, there is a large Shahid Minar in memory of the Language Martyrs of 1952. Next to it, there are two markets of the school. The school has a three-storey building (secondary school branch) and a two-storey building (college branch). There are 32 rooms in the buildings, including computer labs and science labs. The school has a garden.

== Educational activities ==
The institution follows the national curriculum provided by the National Curriculum and Textbook Board (NCTB) for all classes and examinations under the Dhaka Education Board. Bengali and English education are compulsory for all faculties. This curriculum includes institutional subjects of lower secondary, secondary, and higher secondary schools. According to government rules, information and communication technology (ICT) education has recently been made compulsory for secondary and higher secondary class students. The school currently offers classes in the science, humanities and business education streams at the secondary level and the humanities and business education streams at the higher secondary level. Students can choose one of these three major streams.

Uniform

The school's uniform is a sky blue or blue shirt white pants, and white shoes. Full-sleeved shirts are acceptable. The school logo is mandatory on the pocket of the shirt. It is mandatory to wear the student ID card issued by the school during the stay in the school.

== Facilities ==
Library

Kanaipur School and College has a library. Students can use the library during their lunch break. The library is well-stocked with textbooks, stories, novels, general knowledge books, newspapers, magazines and periodicals. The library has about 3,000 books.

Computer Lab

The institution has a state-of-the-art computer lab with about 10 computers. There is a system of teaching children through multimedia classrooms. The computer lab is used for computer education in the subject of information and communication technology.

Cafeteria

The institution has a cafeteria.

Playground

The institution has a playground for sports.

== Sports ==
The institution organizes an annual sports competition every year.

== Institutional information ==
The institution has an EIIN number of 108750, a school code of 5013, and a college code of 5141.

Address: Post office- Kanaipur (postal code 7801), Upazila- Faridpur Sadar, District- Faridpur.

== Gallery ==
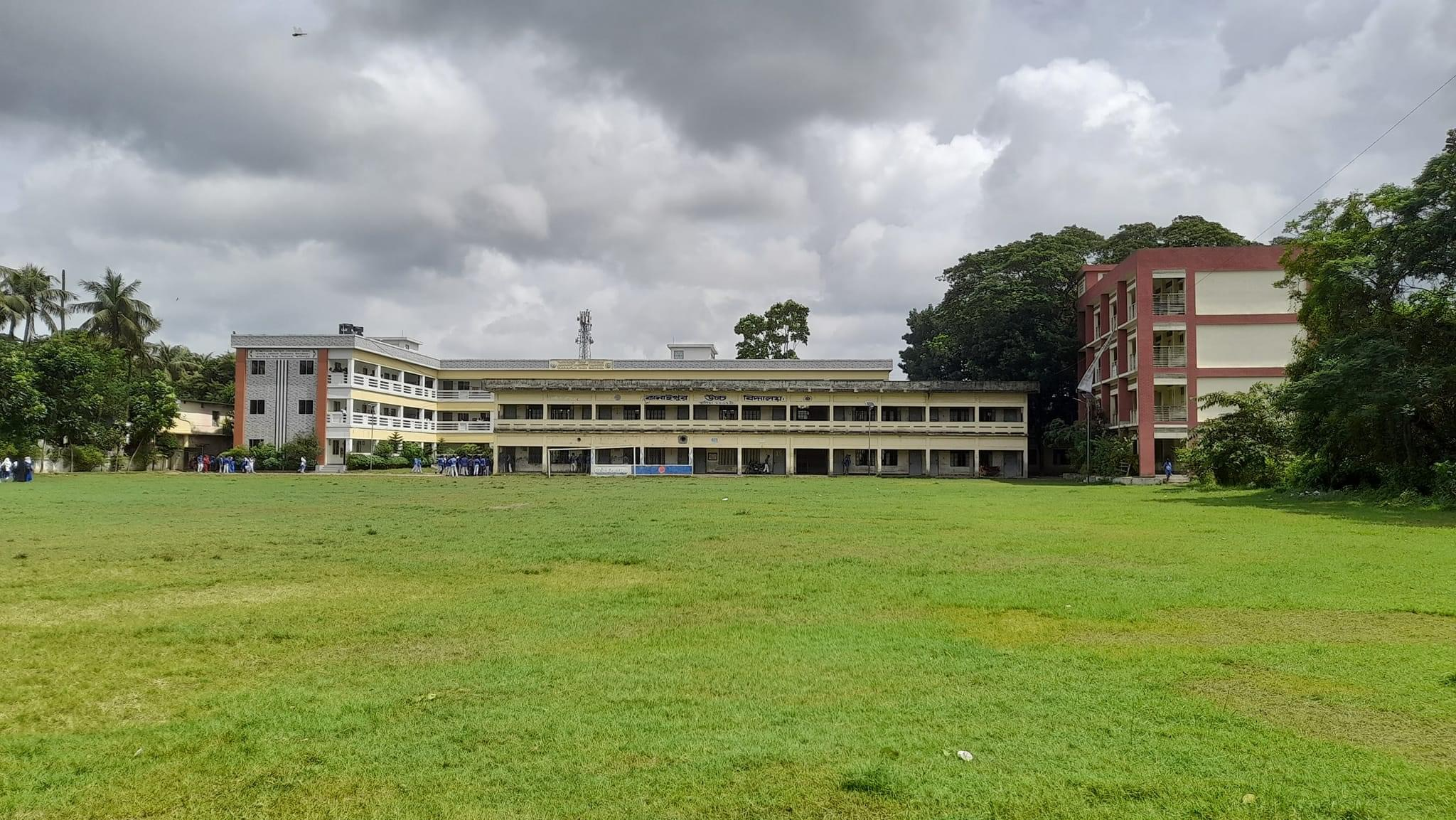
Kanaipur School and College premises.

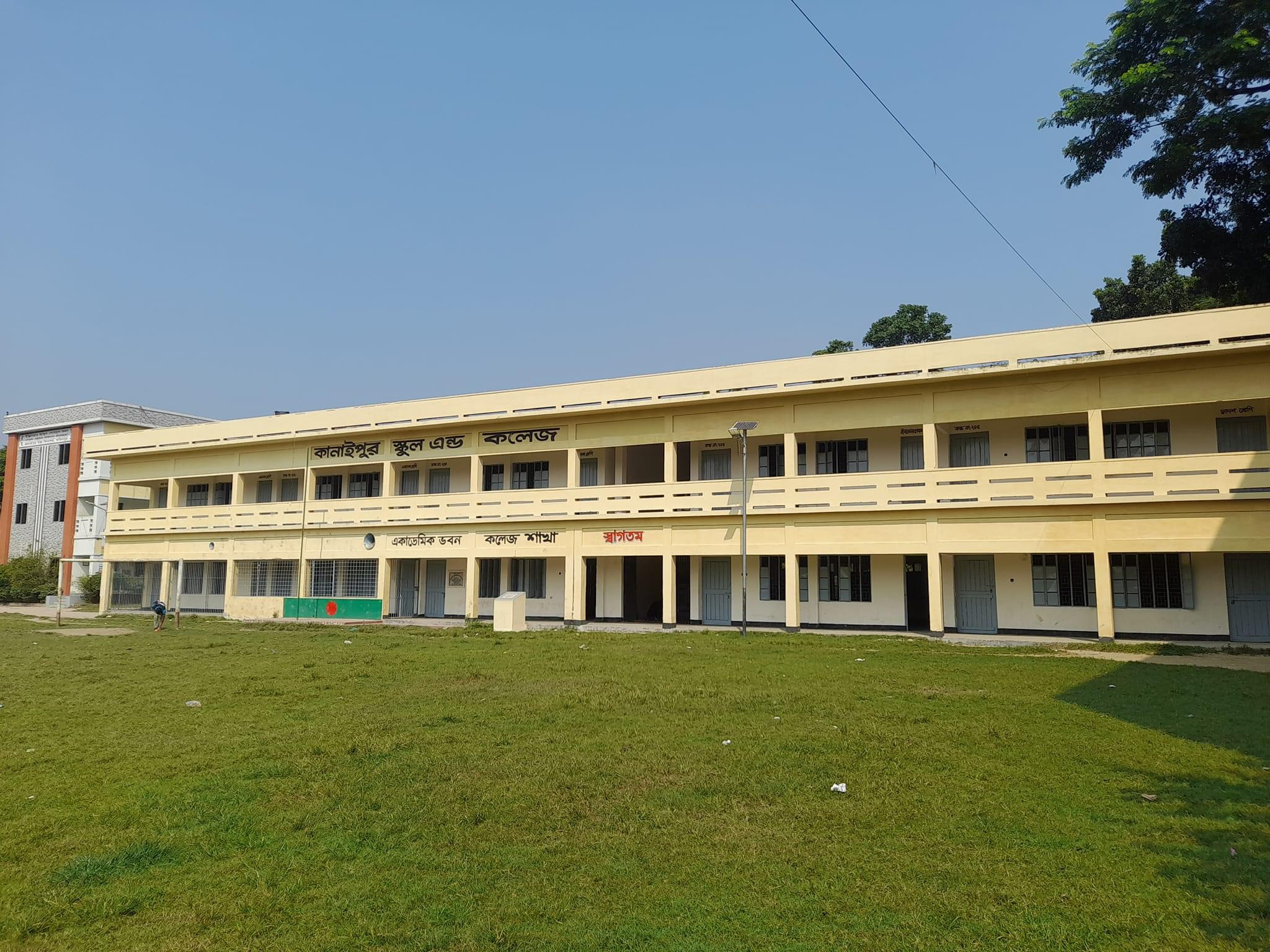
Academic Building of College Branch.

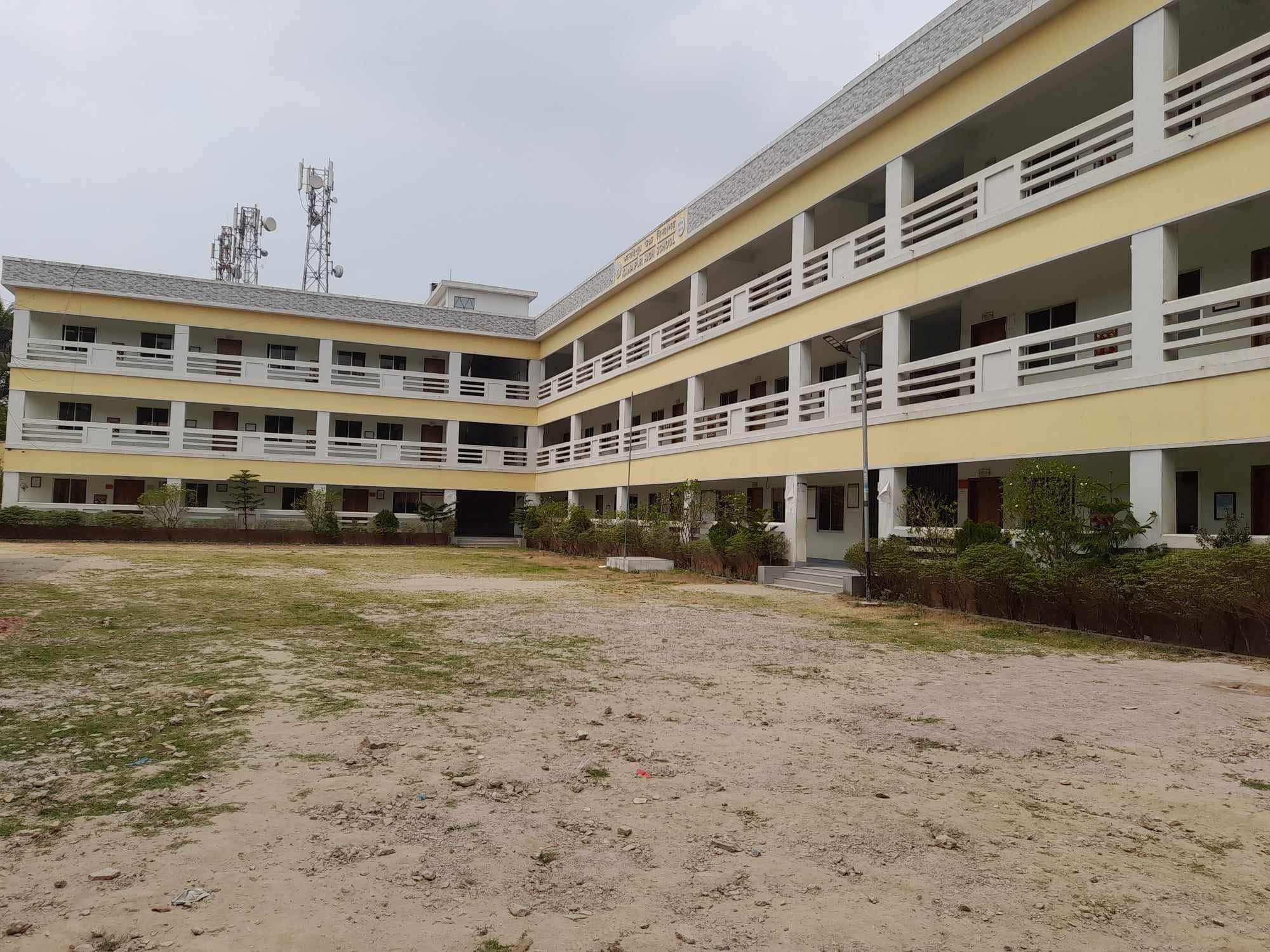
Secondary school premises.

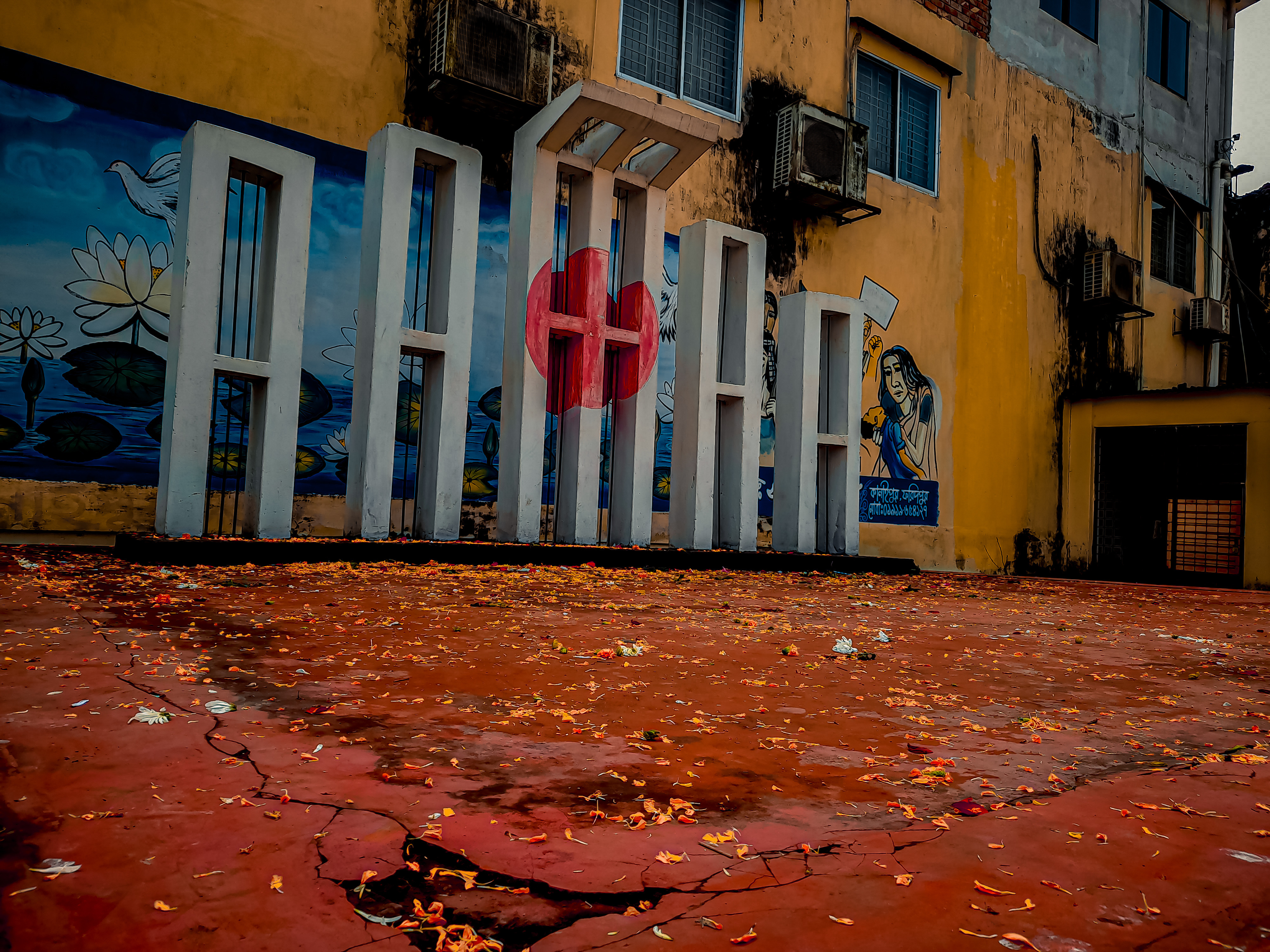
Shaheed Minar of the institution.

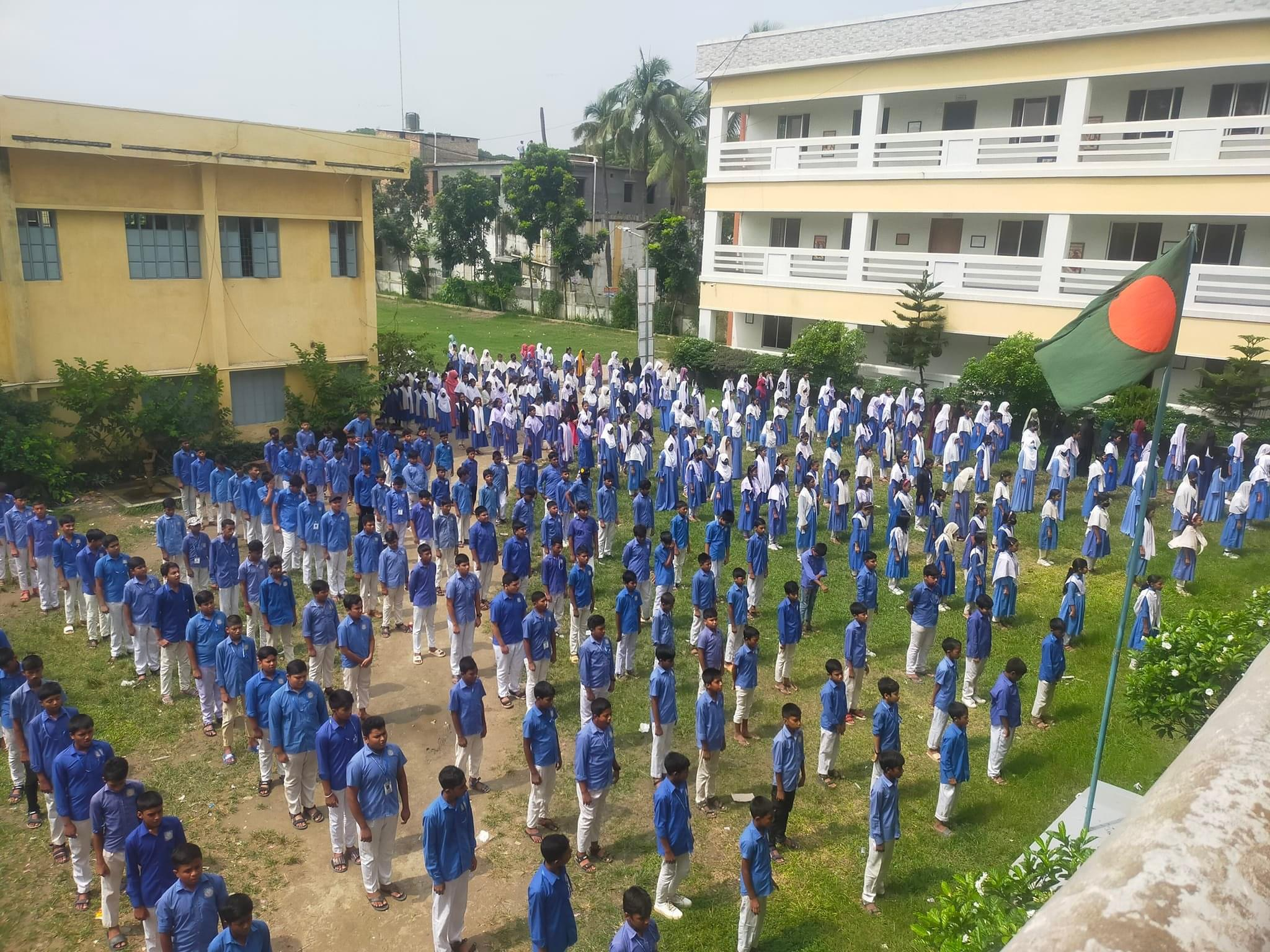
Daily Assembly.

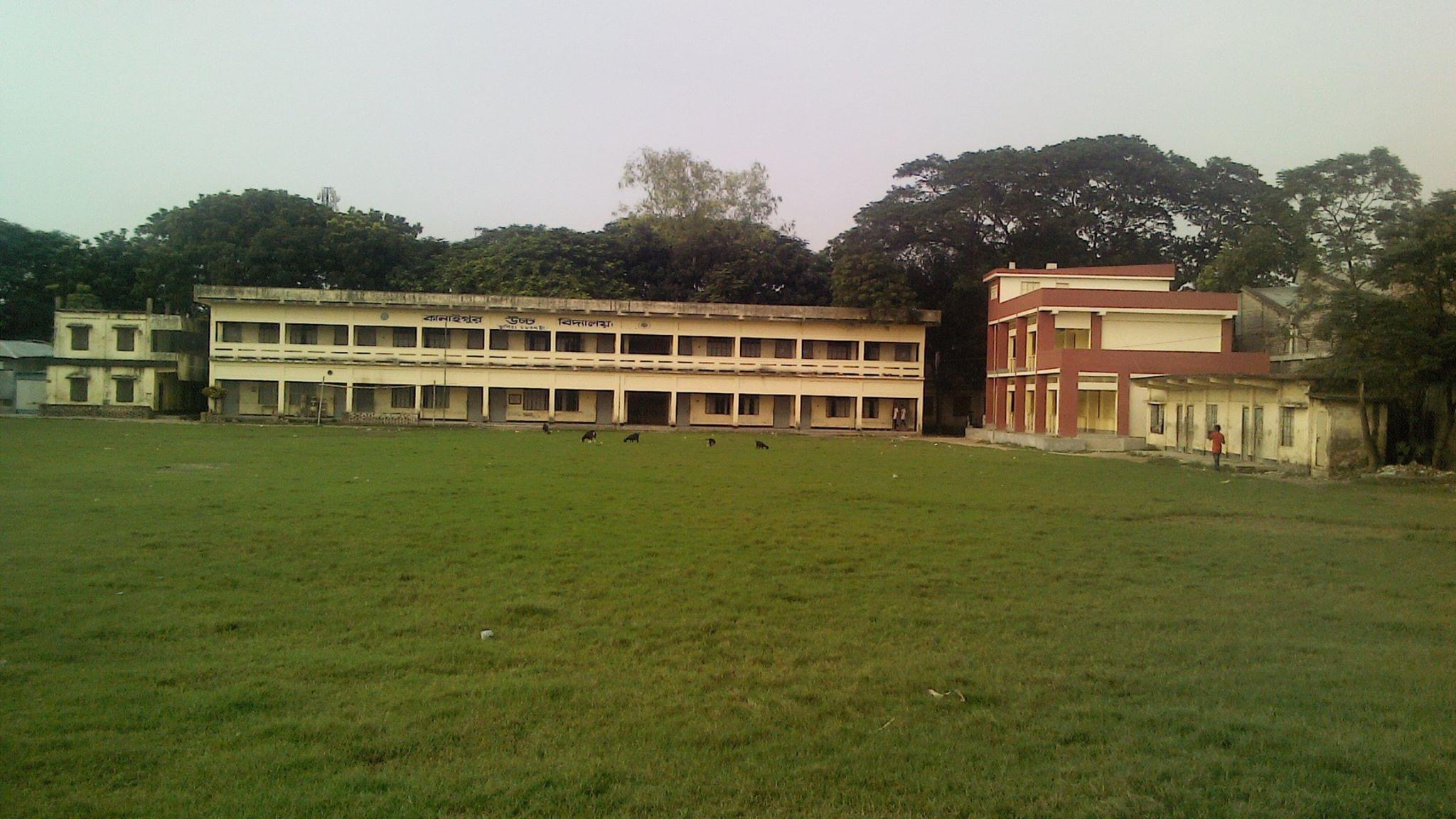
Kanaipur High School (2015 AD).

== See also ==
- Government Rajendra College
- Faridpur Zilla School
