= List of zilla schools of Bangladesh =

Zilla Schools (lit. district school) are some of the oldest secondary schools at district level in Bangladesh , established during the British Raj. In Bangladesh, there are 15 Zilla Schools. Of these, 13 were established during the British era, with the exceptions of Kushtia Zilla School (1960) and Barguna Zilla School (1970) being built in Pakistani Era.

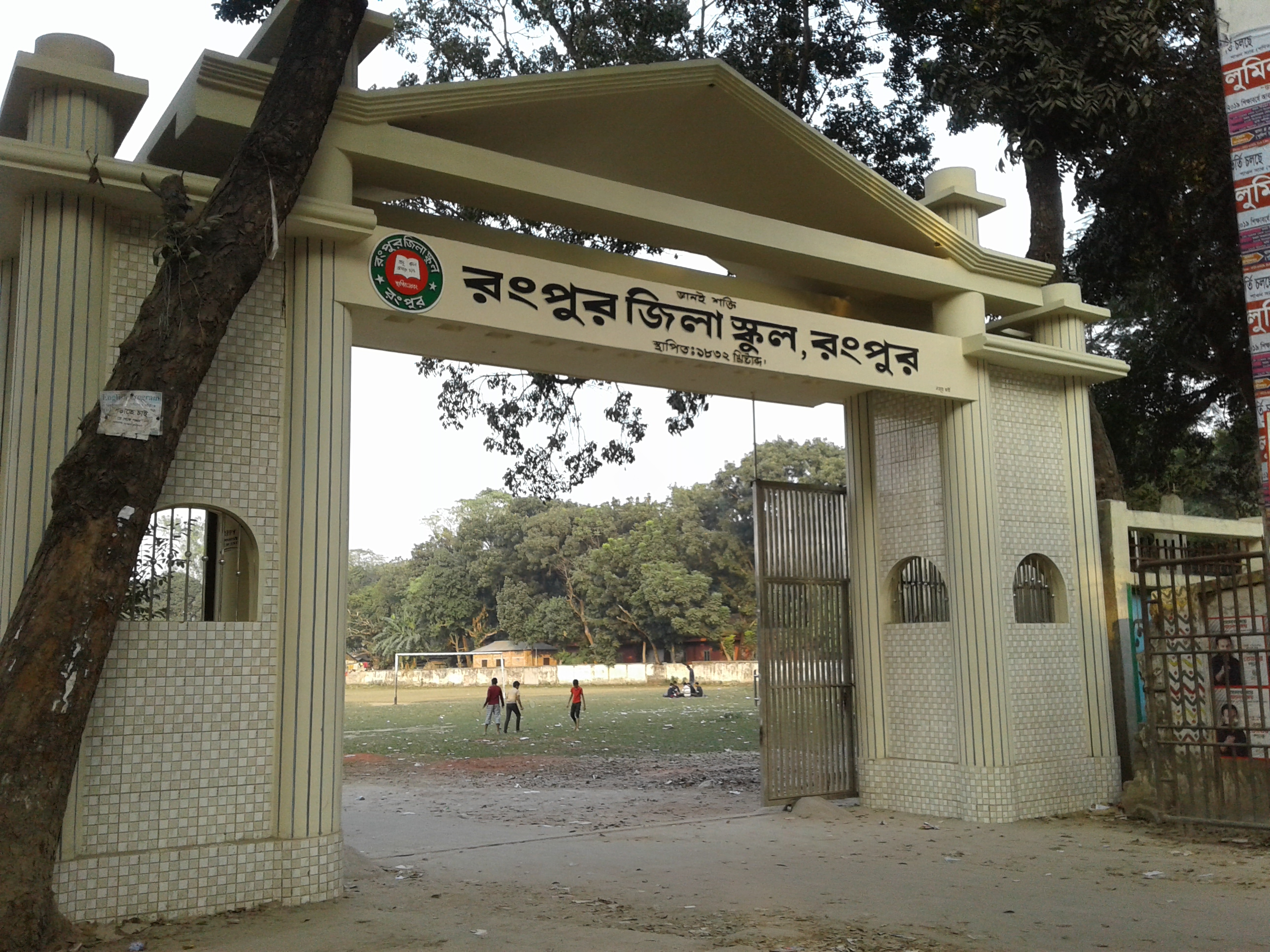
Rangpur Zilla School

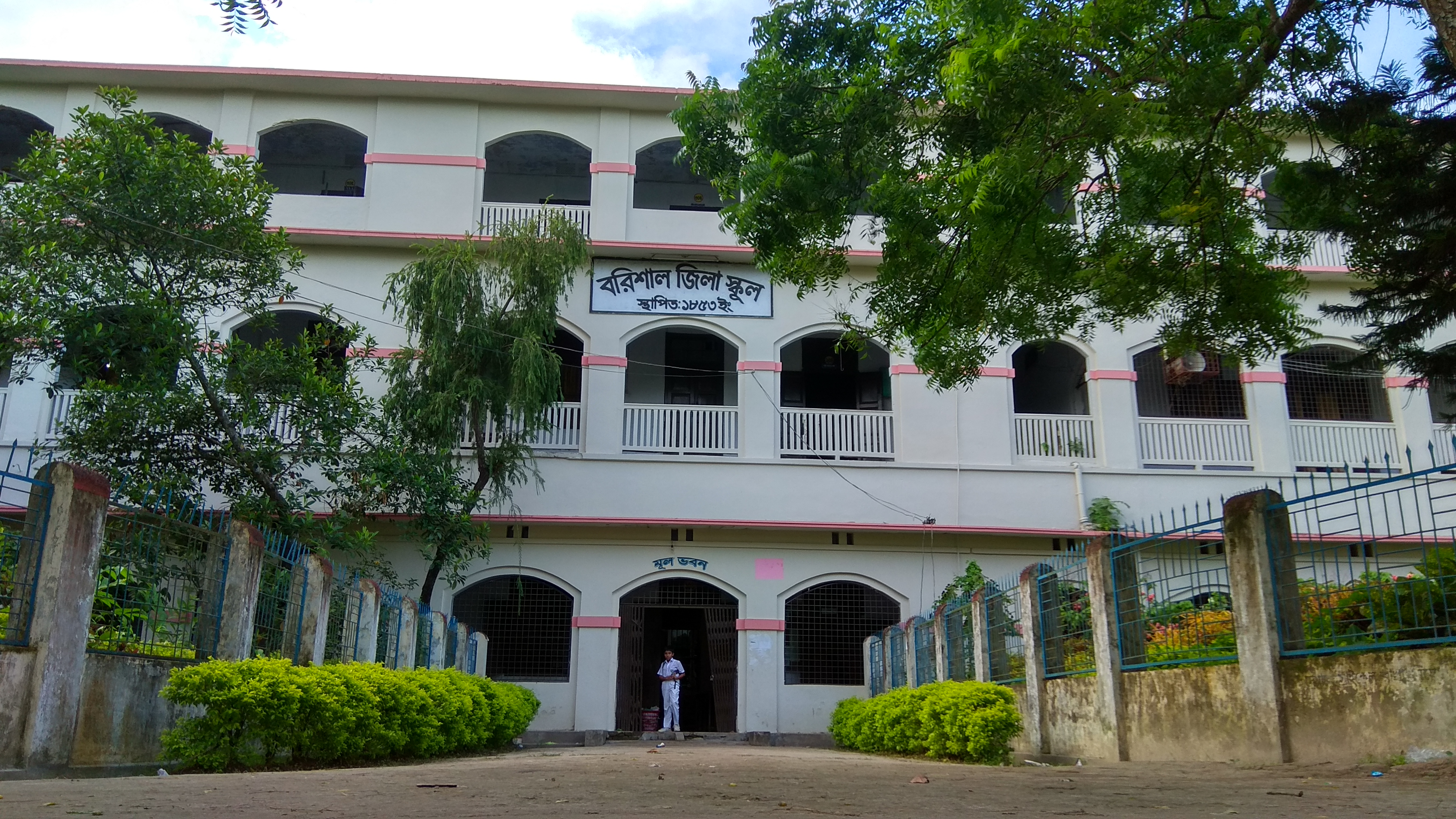
Barishal Zilla School

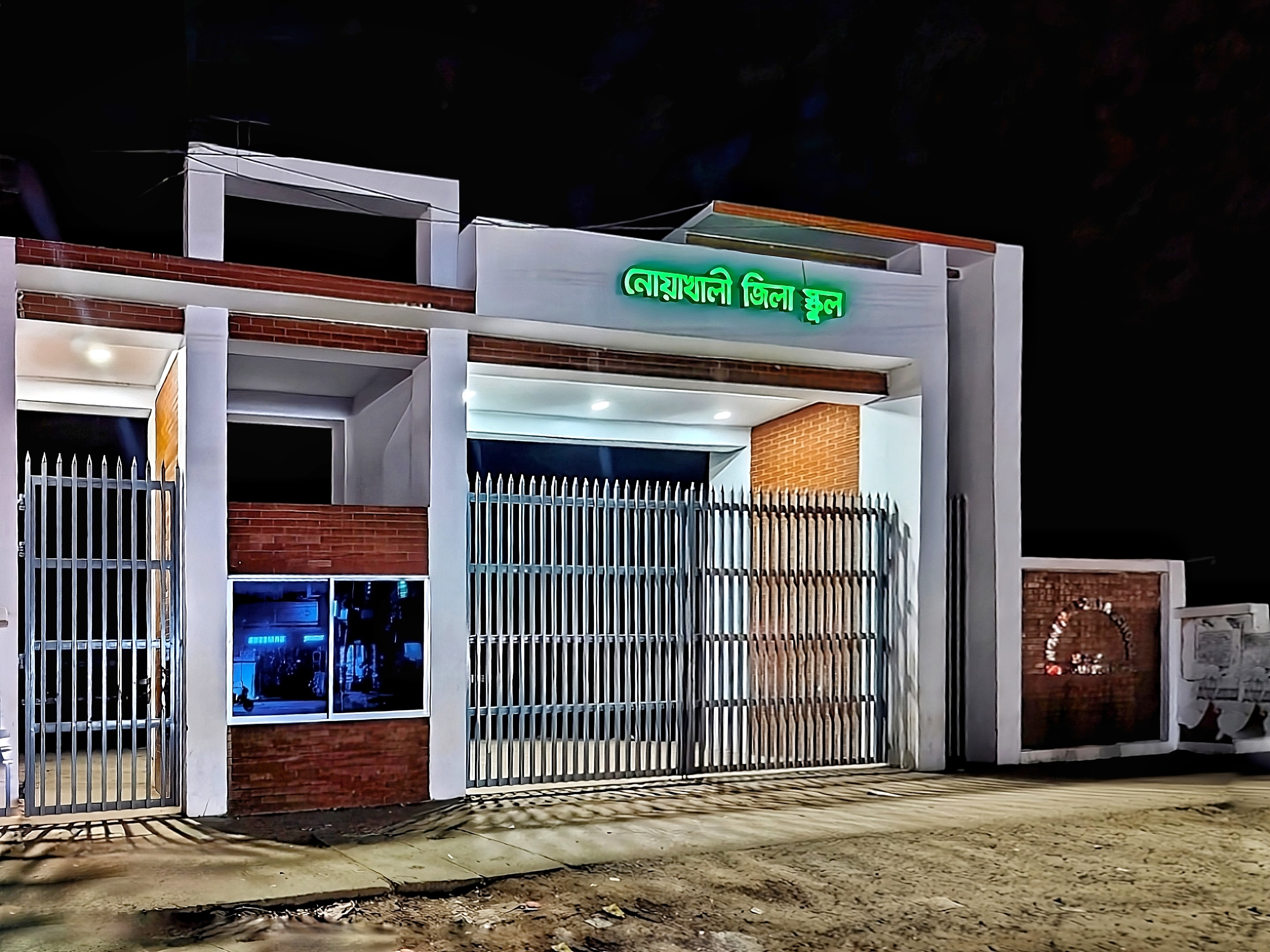
Noakhali Zilla School

The oldest Zilla School in Bangladesh is Barishal Zilla School, founded in 1829 by Lord William Bentinck. The most recently established Zilla School is Barguna Zilla School, which was named in 1970 following its nationalization.

Institution Name	Image	EIIN	Established	City	Website	Source
Barisal Zilla School		100742	1829	Barisal	bzsb.edu.bd	
Comilla Zilla School		105770	1837	Comilla	www.czs.edu.bd	
Kushtia Zilla School		117743	1960	Kushtia	kushtiazillaschool.edu.bd	
Khulna Zilla School		117135	1885	Khulna	kzs.edu.bd	
Jamalpur Zilla School		109873	1881	Jamalpur	jzs.edu.bd	
Dinajpur Zilla School		120719	1854	Dinajpur	dinajpurzillaschool.edu.bd	
Naogaon Zilla School		123413	1917	Naogaon	www.naogaonzillaschool.edu.bd	
Noakhali Zilla School		107540	1850	Maijdee	www.nzs.edu.bd	
Pabna Zilla School		125564	1853	Pabna	www.pzs.edu.bd	
Faridpur Zilla School		108732	1840	Faridpur	faridpurzillaschool.edu.bd	
Bogura Zilla School		119176	1853	Bogra	bograzillaschool.edu.bd	
Barguna Zilla School		100154	1970	Barguna	barisalboard.gov.bd/100154	
Mymensingh Zilla School		111829	1853	Mymensingh	www.mzs.edu.bd	
Jashore Zilla School		115958	1838	Jessore	www.jzsj.edu.bd	
Rangpur Zilla School		127372	1832	Rangpur	www.rangpurzillaschool.edu.bd	

== See also ==
- Education in Bangladesh
- History of education in the Indian subcontinent#Colonial era
- List of schools in Bangladesh
- List of English-medium schools in Bangladesh
- List of Qawmi Madrasas in Bangladesh
- List of colleges in Bangladesh
- List of institutes in Bangladesh
- List of cadet colleges in Bangladesh
- List of medical colleges in Bangladesh
- List of dental schools in Bangladesh
- Textile schools in Bangladesh
- List of architecture schools in Bangladesh
- List of universities in Bangladesh
