= A. B. M. Musa =

Bangladeshi journalist and politician

A B M Musa
- এ বি এম মুসা
- Born: 28 February 1931; Dharmapur village, Fulgazi Upazila, Feni District, Bengal, British India
- Died: 9 April 2014 (aged 83); Dhaka, Bangladesh
- Resting place: Feni district
- Occupation: Journalist
- Spouse: Setara Musa
- Awards: Ekushey Padak

A B M Musa (28 February 1931 – 9 April 2014) was a Bengali journalist. He was the chief editor of Bangladesh Sangbad Sangstha (BSS). He was awarded Ekushey Padak for journalism in 1999 by the government of Bangladesh.

== Education ==
Musa was born in Feni District in on 28 February 1931. He was educated in Chittagong Government Moslem High School, Noakhali Zilla School, Comilla Victoria Government College and Choumohoni College. In Choumohoni College, he first got into journalism as an editor of the college newspaper Koifoyot.

== Career ==
Musa started his career as a journalist in 1950 with the then Daily Insaf. He moved to the Daily Pakistan Observer in the same year. He was a founder of Pakistan Journalists Union and elected general secretary of the then East Pakistan Journalists Union.

Musa was a correspondent of BBC and Sunday Times during the Liberation War of Bangladesh in 1971. He was one of the founder members of Jatiya Press Club. In 1971, he joined Bangladesh Television (BTV) as its director general. He was also the editor of the then Morning News. Musa worked in Bangladesh Sangbad Sangstha (BSS), Bangladesh's national news agency, as its managing director and chief editor from May 1985 to March 1987. Later in his life, he worked as the editor of Daily Jugantor during 2004–05.

Musa was an elected member of parliament (MP) from Feni constituency in 1973, as an Awami League candidate.

== Personal life ==
Musa was married to Setara Musa (1940–2023). Setara completed her master's in Bangla literature from the University of Dhaka and worked for several newspapers, including the Daily Janata, the Dainik Awaz and now defunct the Dainik Purbakon. They had one son Nasim Musa and three daughters namely Mariam Sultana Musa Ruma, Parveen Sultana Musa Jhuma and Dr Sharmin Musa.
