= Faridpur Zilla School =

- ফরিদপুর জিলা স্কুল

Location
- Mujib Shorok; Faridpur District; 7800; Bangladesh; 23.6090°N 89.8437°E

Information
- Type: Bangladeshi Government School
- Mottoes: "Unity, Faith, Obedience"
- Established: 1840; 186 years ago
- School board: Board of Intermediate and Secondary Education, Dhaka
- School district: Faridpur
- Principal: Md.Faridul Islam
- Grades: Fourth to tenth
- Gender: Boys
- Language: Bengali
- Campus size: Big
- Campus type: City-based
- Sports: Cricket, football, badminton, handball
- Website: faridpurzillaschool.edu.bd

Faridupur Zilla School is a secondary school in Faridpur, In 1840, the then district magistrate Edgar Ef Luther, established a school named English Seminary School. In 1851, the British Government took responsibility of the institution and named it Faridpur Zilla School.It's one of the oldest school In Bangladesh

== Notable alumni ==
- Dr. Quazi Deen Mohammad, Neurologist
- Pallikabi Jashimuddin,Poet and Writer
- ANM Bazlur Rashid,Poet

== See also ==
- List of Zilla Schools of Bangladesh
- Kanaipur School & College
- Education in Bangladesh
