= ANM Bazlur Rashid =

- Born: Abu Nayeem Mohammad Bazlur Rashid; 8 May 1911; Faridpur District, Eastern Bengal and Assam, British India
- Died: 1986 (aged 74–75)

Abu Nayeem Mohammad Bazlur Rashid (known as ANM Bazlur Rashid; 8 May 1911 – c. 1986) was a Bangladeshi educationist and litterateur. He was awarded Bangla Academy Literary Award for drama in 1967 and the Tamgha-e-Imtiaz in 1969 for his literary contributions.

== Early life and education ==
Rashid completed his matriculation examination from Faridpur Zila School in 1928. He obtained the IA in 1931 and BA in 1933 degrees from Rajendra College and the BT degree from Dhaka Teachers' Training College in 1938. He later passed MA examination in Bangla from the University of Dhaka in 1954.

== Career ==
Rashid started his career as a teacher of Dhaka Government Muslim High School in 1934. He worked at the Dhaka Teachers’ Training College during 1955–1972. He taught part-time in the department of English at the University of Dhaka during 1973-75 and Jahangirnagar University during 1975–80.

== Works ==
Rashid wrote 35 books. Among the books Panthobina, Uttar Falgoni, Jharer Pakhi, Jibonbadi Rabindranath, Ogo Bideshini and Pakisthaner Sufi-Sadhak are notable.
