= Pabna Zilla School =

Pabna Zilla School, Pabna
- পাবনা জিলা স্কুল

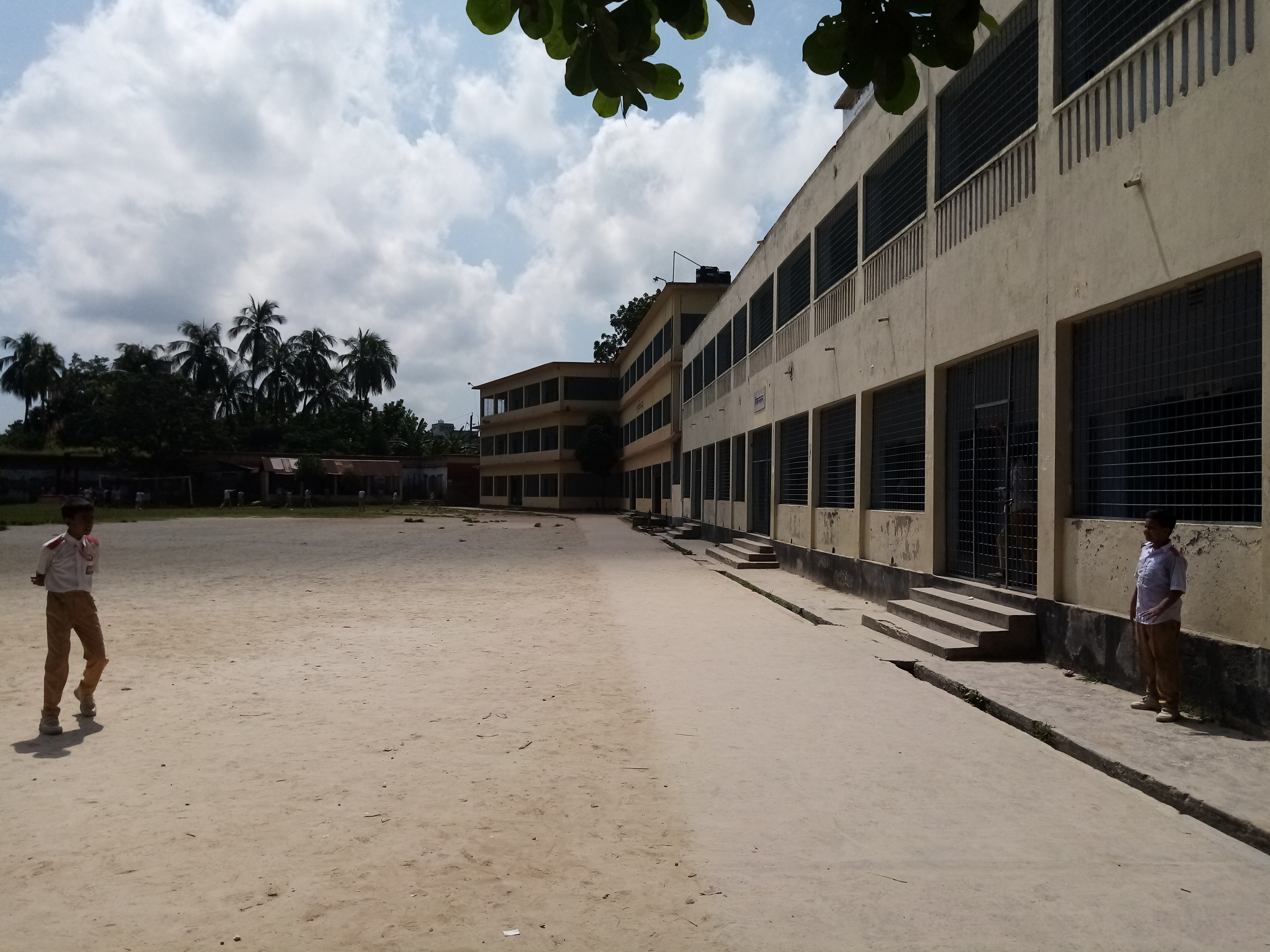

Location
- A. Hamid Road, Pabna; Pabna; Bangladesh; 24°00′08″N 89°14′0″E

Information
- Type: Public
- Motto: Shikkhar Jonno Esho Sebar Jonno Beriye Jao (শিক্ষার জন্য এসো সেবার জন্য বেরিয়ে যাও)
- Established: 1853; 173 years ago
- School board: Board of Intermediate and Secondary Education, Rajshahi
- School district: Pabna
- Principal: Md. Mushtaq Zaman
- Faculty: 60 (4 per class)
- Grades: 3 to 10 (PEC, SSC, JSC)
- Gender: Boys
- Enrollment: 2500
- Language: Bengali
- Campus: Urban
- Campus size: 2.54 acres (1 hectare)
- Website: pzs.edu.bd

Pabna Zilla School (Bengali: পাবনা জিলা স্কুল) is the oldest high school in the Pabna District of Bangladesh. It provides education from class Three to Ten. It has two shifts - morning and day. The morning shift starts at 7:15 am and ends at 11.45am. And the day shift starts at 12:30 pm and ends at 5:15 pm. This only applies from class 6 to 10. From class 3 to 5 time slot is lesser than above for both shifts. Each shift has a 20 minutes tiffin break after the 3rd period.

Though it is a boys' school, it has male and female teachers. The school has one headmaster and two assistant headmasters. It has separate groups of teachers for morning and day shift. The school has a playground, three buildings (the Administrative Building, the Academic Building, and the Science Building), one hall room, a hostel and a mosque. There is a Shaheed Minar on one side of the playground.

== History ==
Pabna Zilla School was established as an Anglo-Vernacular type of school named Hardinge School between 1836-1840. The founder of the school was Babu Digombor Saha and he was assisted by Babu RadhaGobinda Mitra. Babu Ramchandra Nandi was the headmaster during the period 1844–1853. On 1 November 1853 the school became a government Public school (government funded) and was named Pabna Zilla School. In 1966-1967 the number of students were 717.

On behalf of the National Mohammedan Association, the opening assembly of Pabna Zilla School's Muslim Boarding Hall was held on 11 January 1899. Abul Mahmud, the erstwhile Deputy Magistrate of Pabna, gave a speech. The construction of that student hall was primarily funded by the three brother Zamindars of Dulai (Husayn Jan Chowdhury, Fasiluddin Abdul Ghani Chowdhury and Abdul Basit Chowdhury), the Nawab of Dhaka Khwaja Ahsanullah and the Nawab of Dhanbari Syed Nawab Ali Chowdhury. At that time, the branch's assistant editor was Alimuddin.

== Admission ==
It is a Bengali medium school. Admission is arranged in class three once a year. Admission into the school is competitive. After an initial screening, more than 5000 applicants are offered to appear in an admission test for 240 seats only. Coaching centers are also been established in Pabna for the preparation of the admission test.

== Notable alumni ==
- Fazle Hasan Abed, social worker
- Kazi Zainul Abedin, poet
- Jagadish Chandra Bose, scientist
- Bande Ali Mia, poet
- Mohammed Fazle Rabbee, cardiologist and intellectual martyr
- Abdullah Abu Sayeed, writer, television presenter, activist
- Abu Hena Mustafa Kamal, poet
- Kamal Lohani, journalist
- []Commandant (Ret) Sajid Hussain]], MSc (Sweden), Chartered Marine Engineer (UK)
- Amjad Hossain, statesman and freedom fighter.
- Zia Haider, playwright, poet

== Related pages ==
List of Zilla Schools of Bangladesh
