= Barishal Zilla School =

Educational institution for boys in Bangladesh

- বরিশাল জিলা স্কুল

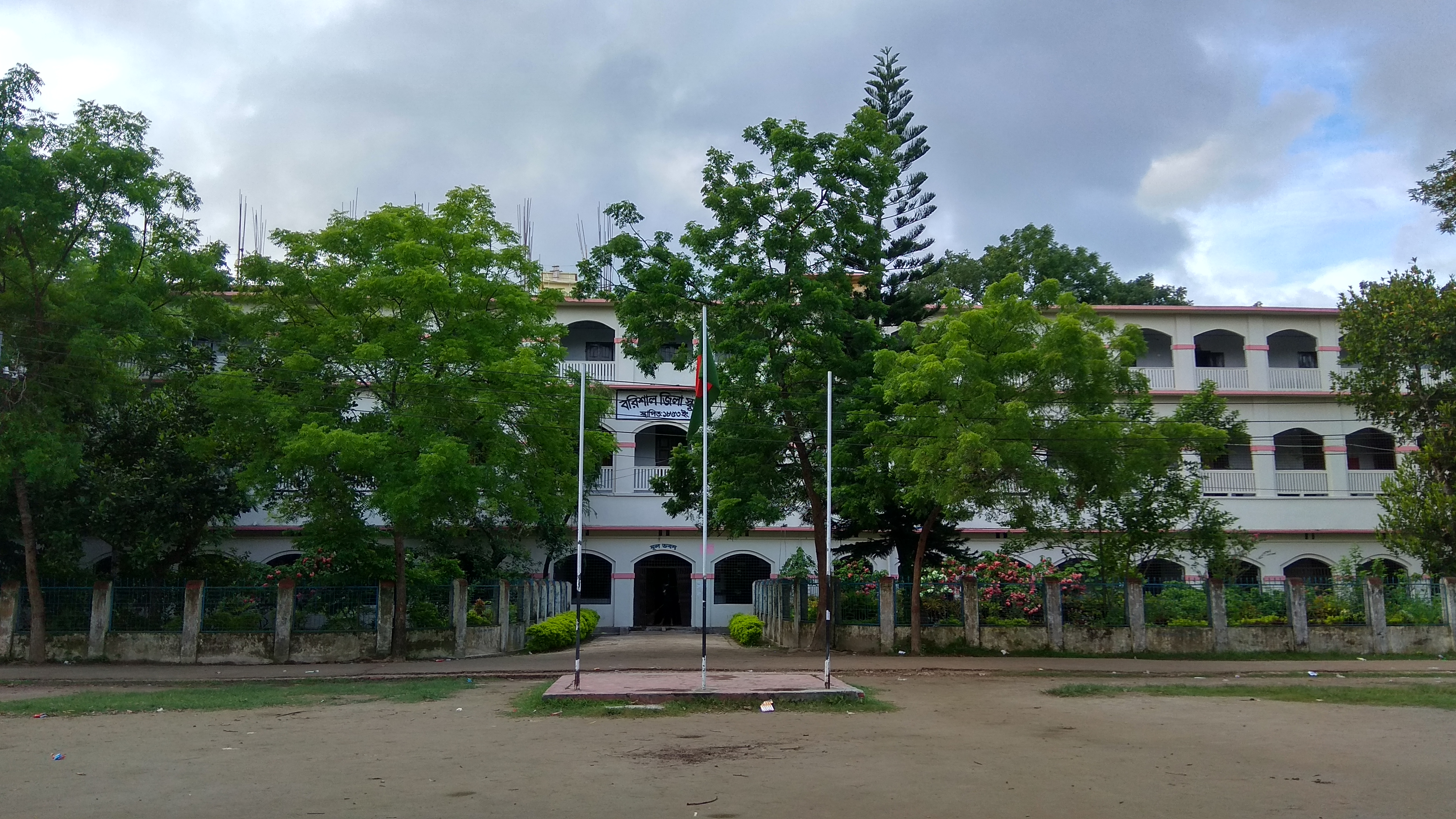
- Academic building of BZS

Location
- Sadar Road; Barisal; 8200; Bangladesh; 22.698°N 90.369°E

Information
- Type: Public
- Motto: পড় তোমার প্রভুর নামে (Read in the name of the Lord)
- Established: 23 December 1829; 196 years ago
- School board: Board of Intermediate and Secondary Education, Barisal
- Headmaster: Muhammad Nurul Islam
- Faculty: 54
- Gender: Male
- Enrollment: 2500+
- Classes: III–X
- Language: Bengali, English
- Campus type: Urban
- Color
- Yearbook: সবুজ পাতা (Sobuj Pata)
- Special project: Connecting classrooms under British Council
- Website: bzsb.edu.bd

Barishal Zilla School (Bengali: বরিশাল জিলা স্কুল), popularly known as BZS, is a public educational institution for boys, located in Barisal, in south-central Bangladesh. It was the first high school established in Barisal Division. Founded as Barisal English School on 23 December 1829 by W. N. Garrett, it began with 27 students. In 1853, the school was renamed Barisal Zilla School.

== History ==
Barisal Zilla School is one of the oldest and most renowned schools in Bangladesh and holds the distinction of being the very first school established in the Barisal Division. Fundamentally speaking, the historic Barisal Zilla School came into being through the tireless endeavors of Mr. N.W. Garret, the then Judge and Magistrate of Barisal district. Under his guidance and direction, a school named Barisal English School saw the light of day on the 23rd of December, 1829, thanks to the financial backing of the local populace, facilitated by the Serampore Mission. Kicking off its activities with merely eight students, the student body swelled to twenty-seven by the year's end.

In the early going, the school was run by the Mission. At that point in time, it was situated on land belonging to the local landowner, Mr. Lucas (west of the Protestant Church). Later on, it was moved to Brown Compound and subsequently, in 1842, took up residence at its present location. The land there was owned by Mr. Spencer. Acting upon the directives of the then Governor of Bengal, the District Magistrate and Secretary of the school, E. J. Barton, kept pressing the government hard and fast for the school's development. By dint of his own efforts, he managed to drum up contributions totaling Tk. 38,817 from prominent citizens and handed this sum over to the government. As a direct consequence, Barisal Zilla School was built from the ground up on extensive land. This very structure has since been pulled down for reconstruction.

From 1853 right up until 1891, the British Government took on the mantle of bearing the school's expenses, and from that time forth it went by the name of Barisal Zilla School. Back then, the school boasted a student body of around 600. Owing to agitation by teachers from several private schools in Barisal town, the government made a move to declare the Zilla School non-governmental in 1892. But following assurances from Syed Moazzem Hossain, the landowner of Sayestabad, to the Governor of Bengal regarding providing funds and land for the school, it was eventually reinstated as a government institution once more in 1906.

Mr. John Smith held the post of Headmaster of this school in 1829. Starting in 1961, the schoolwas turned into a pilot project. At that juncture, arrangements were put in place for its multifaceted changes and expansion under the watchful eye of American specialists. During the great Liberation War of 1971, the students of this school played a gloriously luminous role.

== Notable alumni ==
- A. K. Fazlul Huq, Prime Minister of Bengal (1937–1943)
- Khan Bahadur Hasem Ali Khan, Bengali nationalist and former minister of United Bengal
- Abdul Jabbar Khan, Speaker of the National Assembly of Pakistan (1965–1969)
- Abdur Rahman Biswas, President of Bangladesh (1991–1996)
- Altaf Mahmud, music composer
- Sardar Fazlul Karim, philosopher
- Buddhadeb Guha, writer
- Golam Mustafa, Ekushey Padak and National Film Award winning actor
- Manzoor Alam Beg, father of the fine art photography movement in Bangladesh, Alokchitracharya (the great teacher of photography), Ekushey Padak awardee
- Lieutenant General Hasan Mashhud Chowdhury, former chief of Army staff of Bangladesh
- Tapan Raychaudhuri, historian, Padma Bhushan awardee
- Promode Dasgupta, communist leader
- Tawfiq-e-Elahi Chowdhury, Bir Bikrom
- Hafizuddin Ahmed, Bir Bikrom
- Siraj Sikder, communist revolutionist

== See also ==
- List of Zilla Schools of Bangladesh
