= Noakhali Zilla School =

Coordinates: 22.8641°N 91.0976°E

- নোয়াখালী জিলা স্কুল
- Seal of Noakhali Zilla School
- Maijdee, Noakhali; 3800; Bangladesh

Information
- Type: Government
- Motto: ঈমান, একতা, শিক্ষা, চরিত্র, শৃঙ্খলা (Faith, Unity, Education, Character, Discipline)
- Established: 1850; 176 years ago
- School board: Board of Intermediate and Secondary Education, Comilla
- Headmaster: Mohammad Abul Kashem
- Faculty: 55
- Grades: 5 to 10
- Enrollment: approx. 1500
- Color: White

Noakhali Zilla School (Bengali: নোয়াখালী জিলা স্কুল) is a boy's high school located in the Maijdee town of Noakhali, Bangladesh. It is one of the oldest schools in the country. The school was established in 1850. The institute's EIIN is 107540.

== History ==
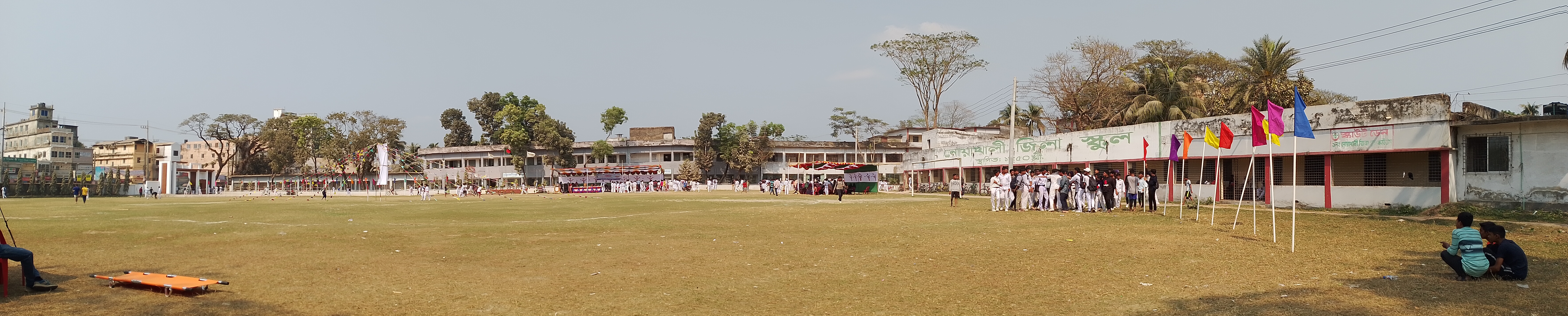
Panoramic view of Noakhali Zilla School's two functioning academic buildings and its playground in 2023

In 1850, Jones, an officer from Ireland, established the school privately in the old town of Noakhali district. After three years of its operation, it was renamed as RK High School. In 1920, the school premise was gone away into the riverbed. It was then shifted to Ghona of Mantiyar located in the east of Mahabbatpur in 1921. Again, it was washed away. The school was then shifted to RK Zubli school on 1 January 1923 and was renamed RK Zila School. In 1931, the school became once again a victim of river erosion and shifted to Bango School and relocated to present place in 1953. It was fully destroyed by striking of cyclone of 1958 and 1970 and then it was reconstructed.

== Notable alumni ==
- Muzaffar Ahmad was a noted Bengali politician, journalist and communist activist, popularly known as "Kakababu".
- Sergeant Zahurul Haq was a sergeant of the Pakistan Air Force, killed in jail when he was under trial. Haq was one of the 35 persons accused in the Agartala conspiracy case officially called State vs Sheikh Mujibur Rahman & Others Case of 1968.
- A. B. M. Musa was a noted journalist.

== See also ==
- List of zilla schools of Bangladesh
