= Government Rajendra College =

Public college in Faridpur, Bangladesh

Government Rajendra College, Faridpur
- সরকারি রাজেন্দ্র কলেজ,ফরিদপুর
- Type: Public
- Established: 1918
- Affiliations: National University, Bangladesh
- Principal: Professor S M Abdul Halim
- Location: Faridpur, Bangladesh; 23.6030°N 89.8421°E
- Campus: Urban, 54.01 acres (0.218 km^{2})
- Website: rajendra.college.gov.bd

Government Rajendra College (Bengali: সরকারি রাজেন্দ্র কলেজ) is a public college, located in Faridpur, Bangladesh which is considered as the best of South Bengal. It offers higher-secondary education (HSC). It has bachelor's degree and master's degree programmes as well, which divisions are affiliated with National University. Currently Professor SM Abdul Halim is the principal of the college. Among 685 colleges under National University, Government Rajendra College is ranked 28th according to National University College Ranking 2015. It was established by Ambica Charan Mazumdar in 1918.

== Academic departments ==
- Department of Accounting
- Department of Bangla
- Department of Botany
- Department of Chemistry
- Department of English
- Department of Economics
- Department of Environment Science
- Department of History
- Department of History and Culture
- Department of Islamic studies
- Department of Management
- Department of Mathematics
- Department of Marketing
- Department of Political Science
- Department of Philosophy
- Department of Physics
- Department of Social work
- Department of Sociology
- Department of Zoology

== Notable alumni ==
- Palli Kobi Jasimuddin, a famous Bangladeshi Poet, lyricist, composer and writer
- Abu Ishaque, novelist
- A.B.M. Nurul Islam, MNA for the Faridpur-cum-Dhaka constituency (1965-1969)
- Sarwar Jahan Mia, politician & MP for Faridpur-5 constituency
- Quazi Deen Mohammad, neurologist

== Gallery ==
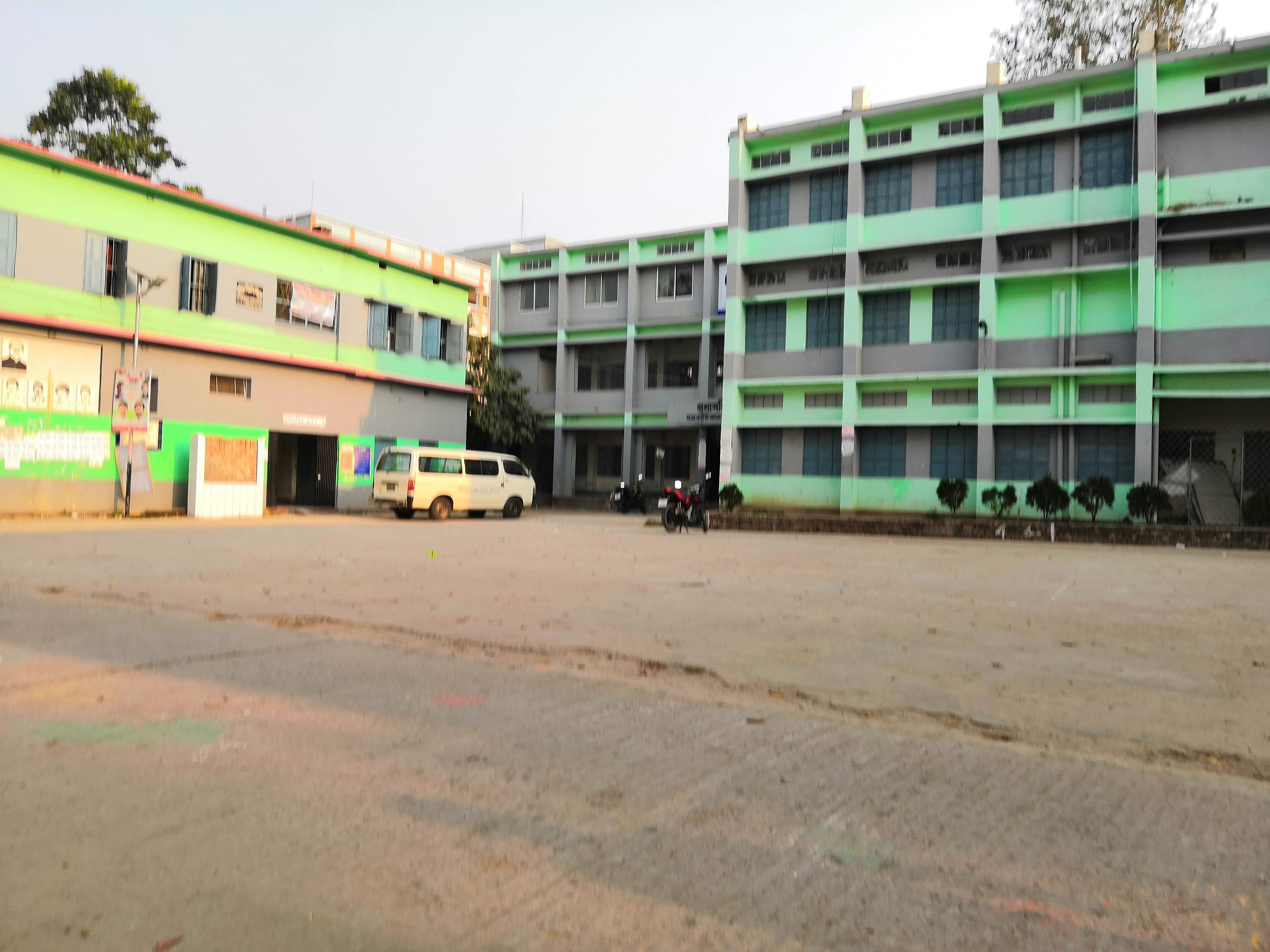
Main campus of the Government Rajendra College also known as degree shakha.

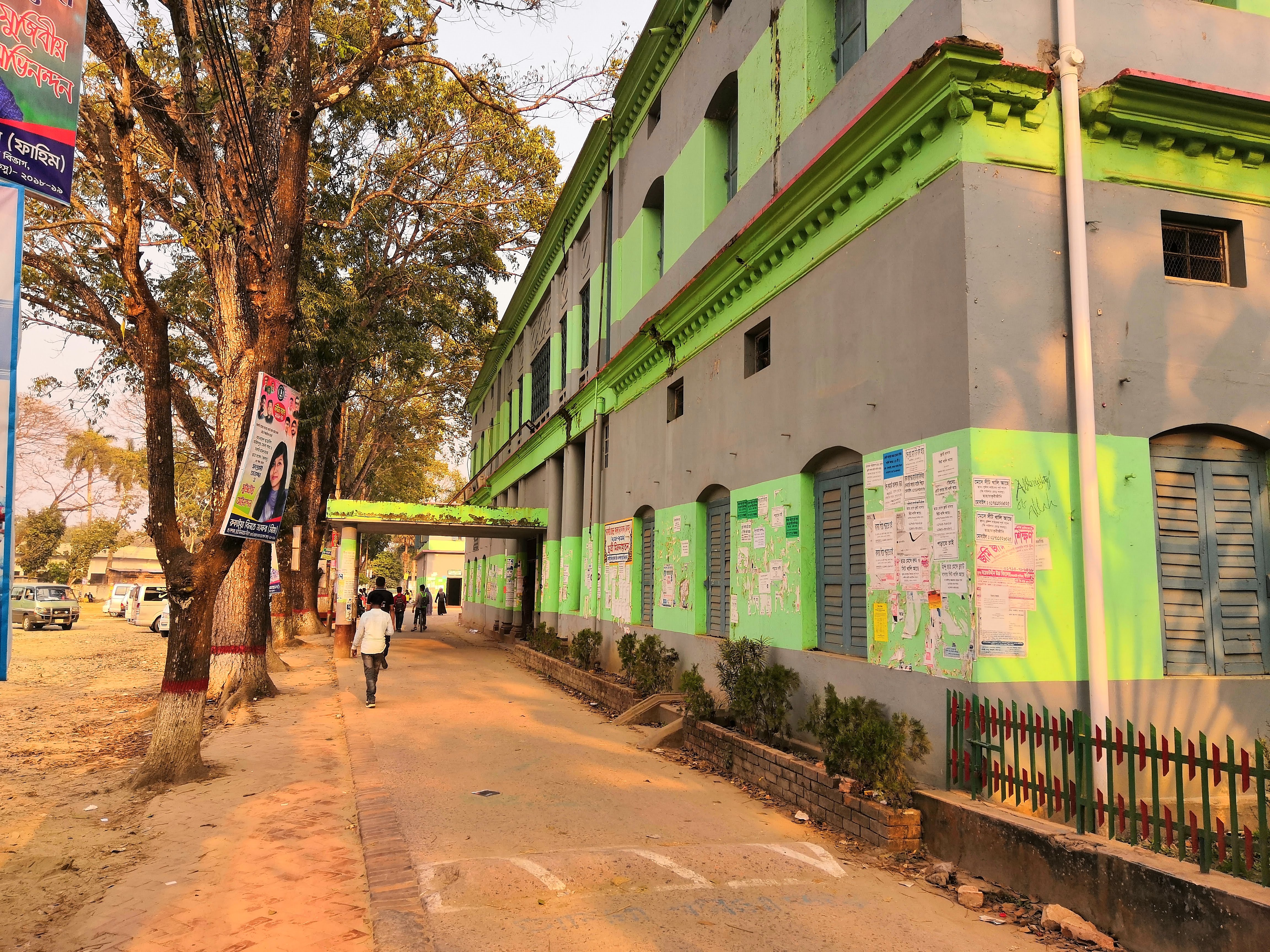
Main campus of the Government Rajendra College also known as degree shakha.

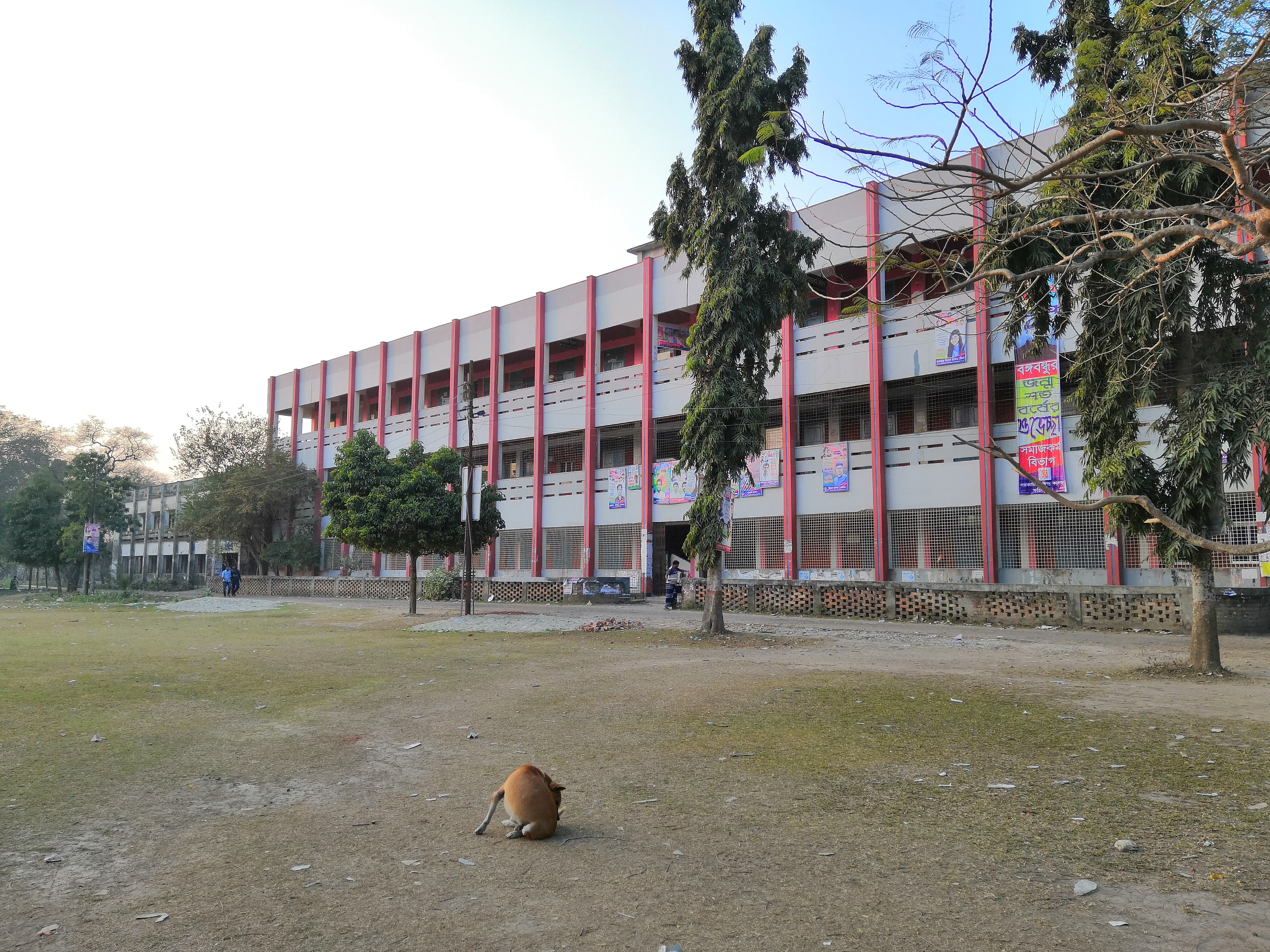
Main building of the Honors campus of the Government Rajendra College in Baitul Aman.

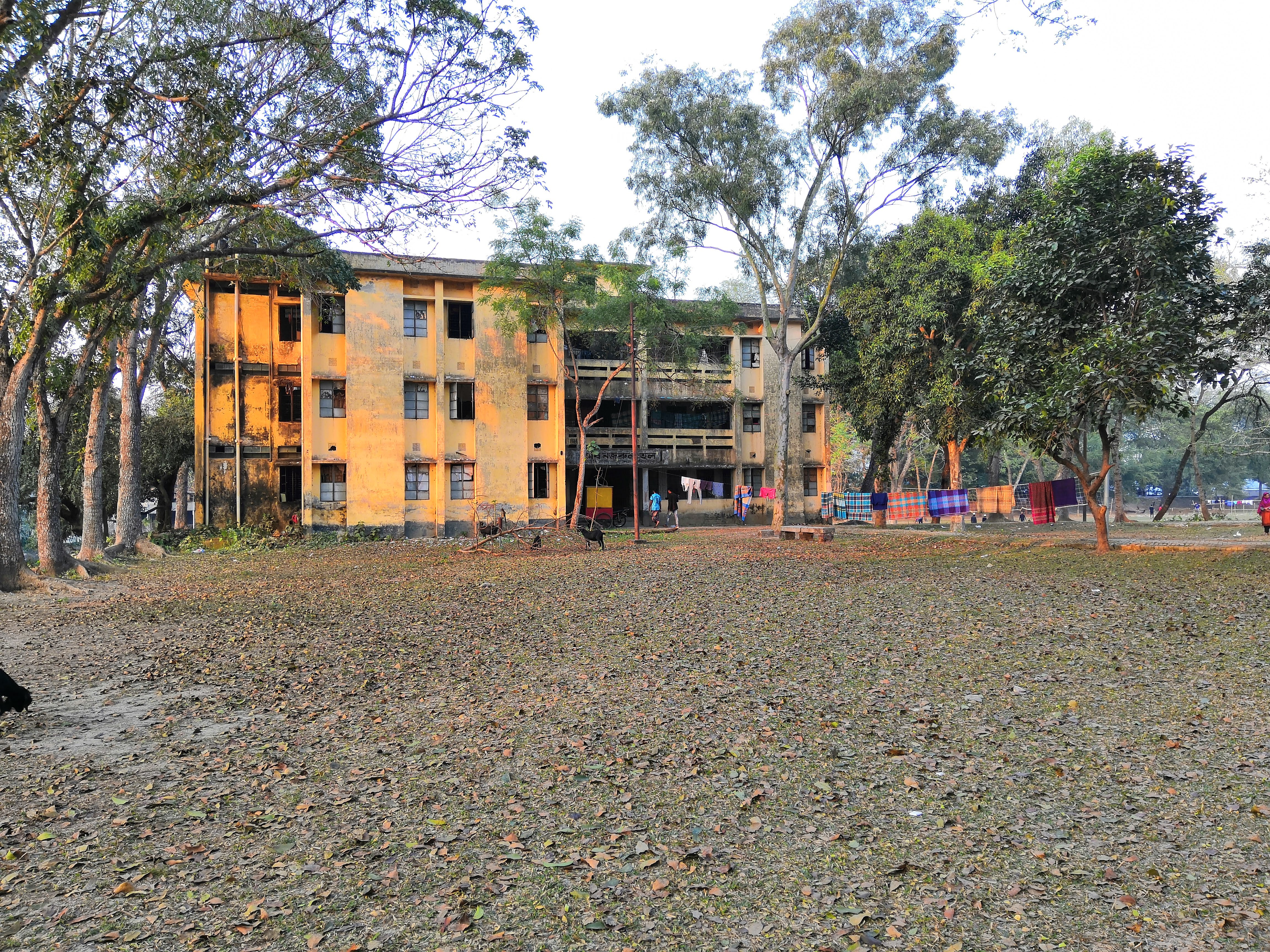
Kabi Nazrul Hall of Government Rajendra College. This is beside the Honors campus of the Government Rajendra College in Baitul Aman.

== See also ==
- Kanaipur School & College
