= Naogaon Zilla School =

- নওগাঁ জিলা স্কুল
- Main building of the school

Location
- Coronation Para, Naogaon; Naogaon; Bangladesh; 24.814°N 88.940°E

Information
- Former name: Coronation Middle English School; Naogaon Coronation High School; United High School
- Type: Government secondary school
- Motto: পড় তোমার প্রভুর নামে (Read in the name of your God)
- Established: 1917
- School board: Board of Intermediate and Secondary Education, Rajshahi
- School code: EIIN 123413
- Headmaster: Md. Solaiman
- Grades: 3–10
- Gender: Only Boys
- Enrolment: About 1,000
- Language: Bengali
- Campus size: 1.76 acres
- Campus type: Urban
- Colours: Khaki and white
- Sports: Cricket, football
- Website: www.naogaonzillaschool.edu.bd

Naogaon Zilla School (Bengali: নওগাঁ জিলা স্কুল) is a government boys' secondary school in Naogaon, Bangladesh. It was established in 1917 as Coronation Middle English School, became a high school in the 1940s, and was nationalised in 1985. The school is in the centre of Naogaon town, at Muktir Mor, and teaches grades 3 to 10.

== History ==
The school was established in Naogaon in 1917 as Coronation Middle English School. A large celebration was held in Naogaon in 1911 for the coronation of George V, and the school was founded with the funds collected for that occasion. It began as a pathshala (a small village school). Badruddin Mia (Boalia) and Labon Pandit taught there without pay, and Surendranath Talapatra was the founding headmaster of the Coronation School.

The school was upgraded to a high English school in 1942. In 1961, under the then sub-divisional officer Abdur Rab Chowdhury, the madrasa branch of B. M. C. College became a parallel high school and later Naogaon High School. It then merged with Naogaon Coronation High School to form United High School.

The school was nationalised in 1985 and renamed Naogaon Zilla School. On 27 April 1985, President Hussain Muhammad Ershad visited Naogaon to address a public meeting and to oversee, among other things, the nationalisation of the Naogaon girls' school. At the request of the teachers of United School, he briefly visited the school and announced its new name, Naogaon Zilla School.

== Campus ==
The school stands on 1.76 acres of land and has three buildings, one of which is a hostel. The main building is three storeys high. The school has an old library holding a number of rare books, a science laboratory, an ICT laboratory, a playground, a prayer room, an auditorium, a bicycle garage and 20 classrooms.

Students who live far from the school can stay in its hostel, called the Naogaon Zilla School Hostel, inside the school grounds. Applications for a place are made to the headmaster through the class teacher.

== Admission ==
The school teaches grades 3 to 10. Students are usually admitted in grades 3, 6 and 9 through a competitive admission test.

== Academics ==
Grades 3 to 5 have one section each, and grades 6 to 10 have two sections each. Each section has a class teacher who takes attendance, collects monthly fees, keeps in touch with guardians and announces the section's results.

According to Banglapedia, the school's pass rate was 100 per cent.

As a government school, its fees are lower than those of private schools. Students pay a monthly fee together with a tiffin fee.

=== Morning assembly ===
A morning assembly is held each day on the school playground. A student recites from the Quran, another reads from the Bhagavad Gita, and the students together take a pledge and sing the national anthem. A physical education teacher then leads a short exercise session. All students and teachers attend, and teachers check that students are in uniform.

== Co-curricular activities ==
An annual sports competition is held on the school's own ground. Students compete by class in events such as running, high jump, long jump and shot put, and the first three in each event receive prizes.

An annual cultural competition is held in the school hall. It includes Rabindra Sangeet, Nazrul Geeti, patriotic and modern songs, as well as comedy, solo acting, extempore speech, essay writing and storytelling. Winners are given prizes at a function at the end of the year.

Students take part in district and inter-district tournaments under the supervision of a teacher, particularly in cricket. The school team has won district championships and has also won prizes at national level.

The school has a Scout programme, and under a Scout teacher the students take part in activities on national days such as 21 February, 26 March and 16 December, and in national Scout gatherings. The school also holds regular debating competitions, Red Crescent activities, science fairs and an ICT week.

Under a religion teacher, an annual Islamic competition is held, with events in azan recitation, Quran recitation, hamd-naat and Islamic essay writing. The school also holds an annual milad mahfil, to which all guardians are invited.

== Achievements ==
- In 2013 the school placed 20th in the Rajshahi Education Board in the Secondary School Certificate (SSC) examination.
- In 2010 and 2011 the school placed first in Naogaon District in the Primary Education Completion examination.

== Centenary ==
The school, established in 1917, completed 100 years in 2017. To mark the centenary, a two-day festival for former and current students was held on the school grounds.<ref>{{cite web |url=https://www.bhorerkagoj.com/print-editi

== See also ==
- List of Zilla Schools of Bangladesh
