= Kanhaipur, Uttar Pradesh =

Village in Uttar Pradesh, India

Kanhaipur is a village in Mirzapur District, Marihan Sub-District, Uttar Pradesh, India.
