= Zila School Chapra =

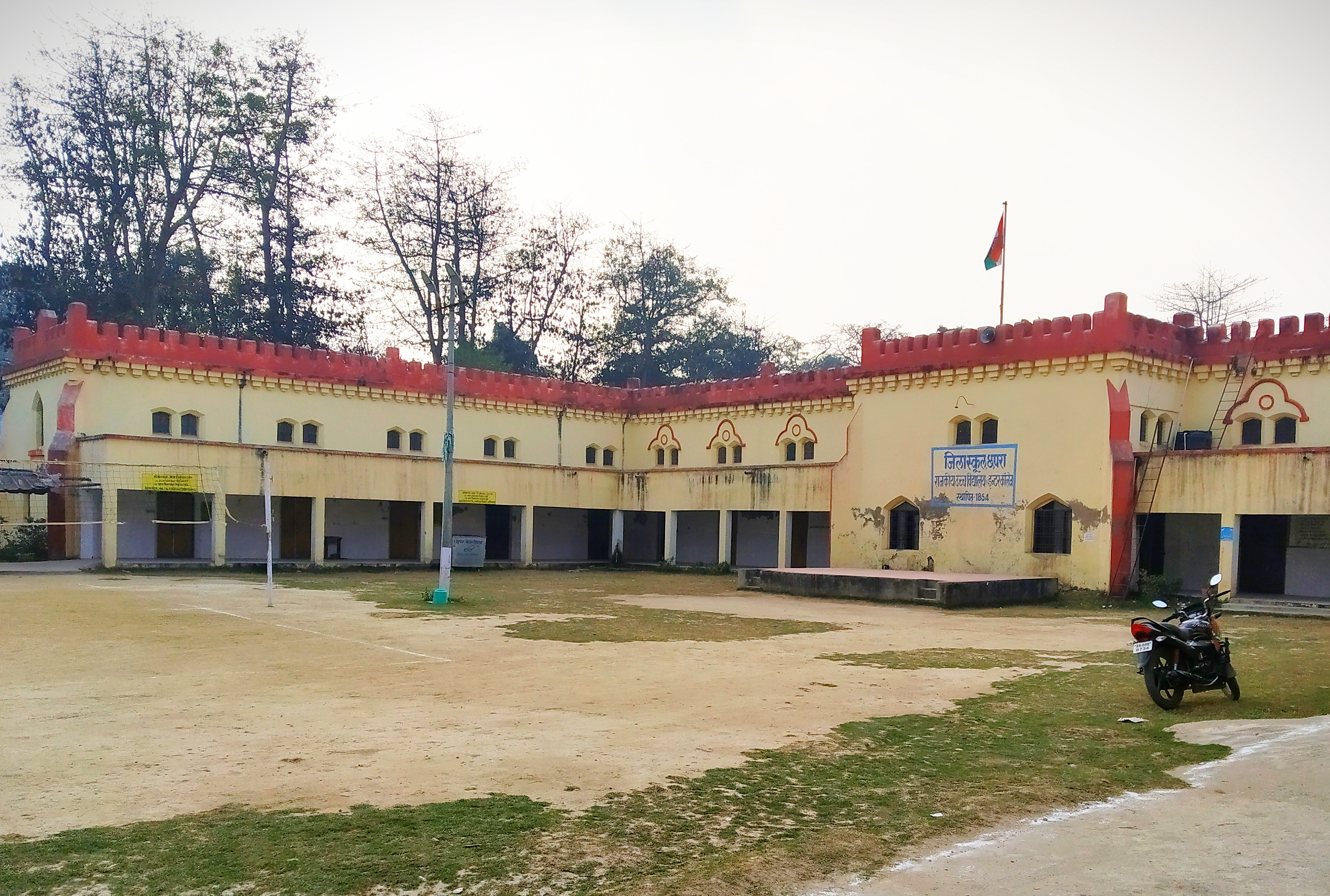
- Campus of Zila School Chapra

Location
- Malkhana Chowk, near Hospital Chowk, Chapra; Bihar, 841301; India
- Coordinates: 25°46′55″N 84°43′53″E

Information
- Established: 1854; 172 years ago
- School board: Bihar School Examination Board
- Principal: Munmun Prasad Shrivastava
- Grades: 9th & 10th
- Language: Hindi
- Campus size: 5 acres (0.020 km^{2})
- Alumni: Rajendra Prasad

Zila School Chapra is a high school in the Chapra district of Bihar, India. The school was established in 1839, and hosts students in grades 9 to 12. It is affiliated with the Bihar School Examination Board, Patna.

Notable graduates include the first president of India, Rajendra Prasad, who completed his education there.

== Notable alumni ==
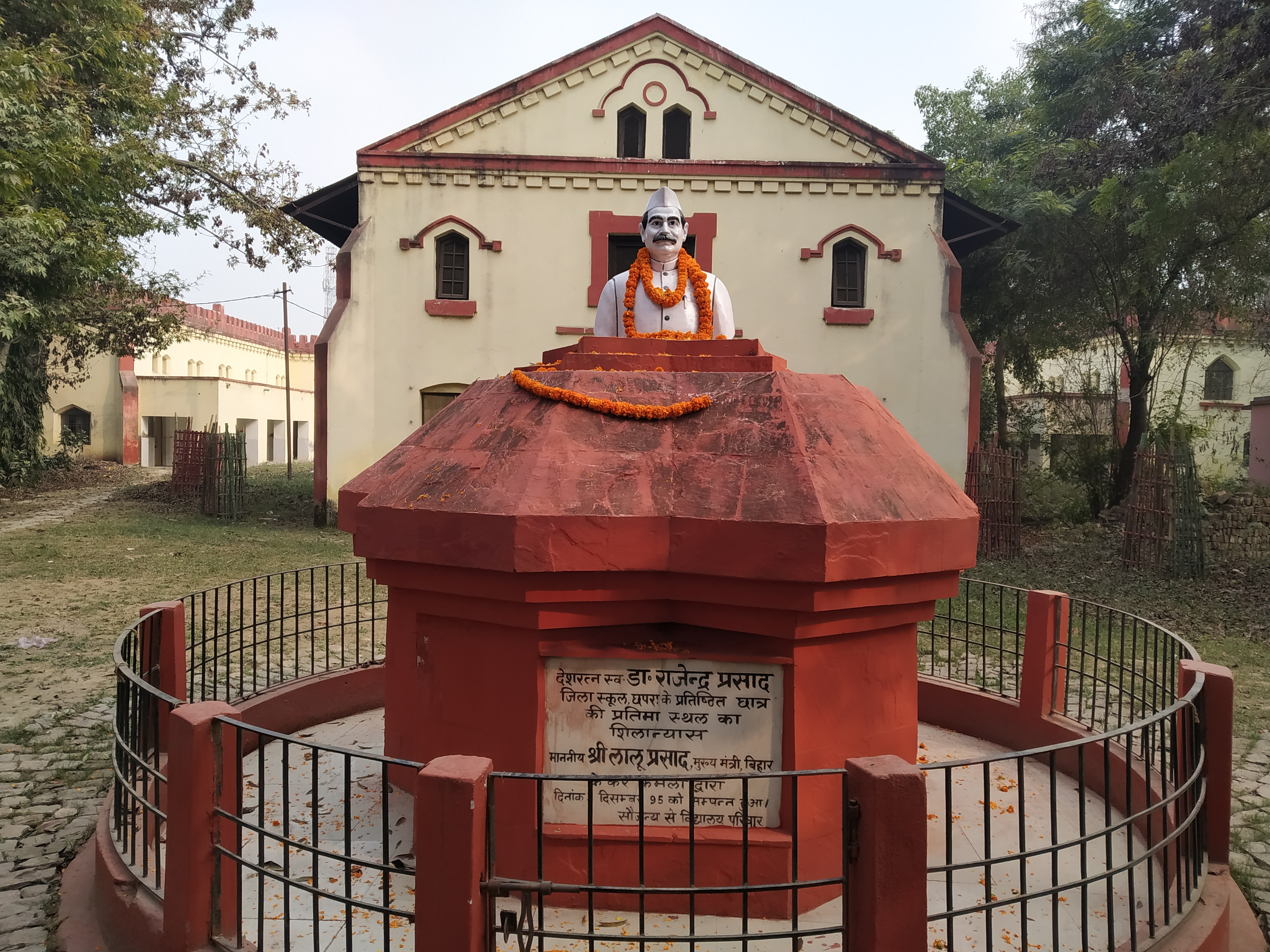
Statue of Rajendra Prasad on the campus

- Rajendra Prasad, first president of India
- Anand Raj, National Champion of Tata Crucible Business Quiz for Corporates(2021) and Multiple times Winner of AIMA National Management Quiz.
