= Barguna Zilla School =

- বরগুনা জিলা স্কুল

Location
- Abdul Kader Road; Barguna; 8700; Bangladesh; 22.15587°N 90.12237°E

Information
- Type: Government school
- Motto: "Knowledge is Power"
- Established: 1970
- School board: Board of Intermediate and Secondary Education, Barisal
- Principal: Hasina Begum
- Staff: 2
- Teaching staff: 33
- Grades: Third–Tenth
- Gender: Boys' school
- Enrollment: 997
- Language: Bengali
- Area: 4.53 acres
- Campus type: Urban
- Colour
- Sports: Cricket, Football

Barguna Zilla School is a boys' school in the southern region of Bangladesh. It was established in 1927 under the name Barguna M.E. (Middle English) School and was nationalized in 1970, when it was renamed Barguna Zilla School. The school educates children from class one to class ten and also operates an open education system.

== History ==
In 1927, Md. Ramzan Ali Akon, an education enthusiast and social worker, who was the first metric pass and Entrance I.S.C. (under the University of Calcutta) in Barguna District and the first president of Barguna Union Board (serving five terms), established an English medium school named Barguna M.E. School (Barguna Middle English School) with the help of local elite personalities. He also served as its founding headmaster. In 1931, the school was upgraded to a secondary school. In 1934, Abdul Majid Mia (B.A., B.T.) joined as headmaster. In 1938, the school was upgraded to a high school. In 1970, the school was nationalized, and the then Pakistan government took responsibility for its management and expenses. Since then, it has been known as Barguna Zilla School.
