= Kanaipur Union =

Bangladeshi union

Coordinates: 23.5397°N 89.7744°E

Kanaipur Union is a union parishad in Sadar Upazila of Faridpur District, Dhaka Division, Bangladesh. A market in Kanaipur is important within the upazila.
