= List of colleges and universities in Noakhali District =

Noakhali District of Bangladesh has 1 university, 43 colleges, and several specialized tertiary education institutions.

== Universities ==
The only university in the district is the public Noakhali Science and Technology University, established in 2006, at Sonapur.

== Law colleges ==
The only college of law in the district is the private Noakhali Law College, in Maijdee Court, Noakhali.

== Medical colleges ==
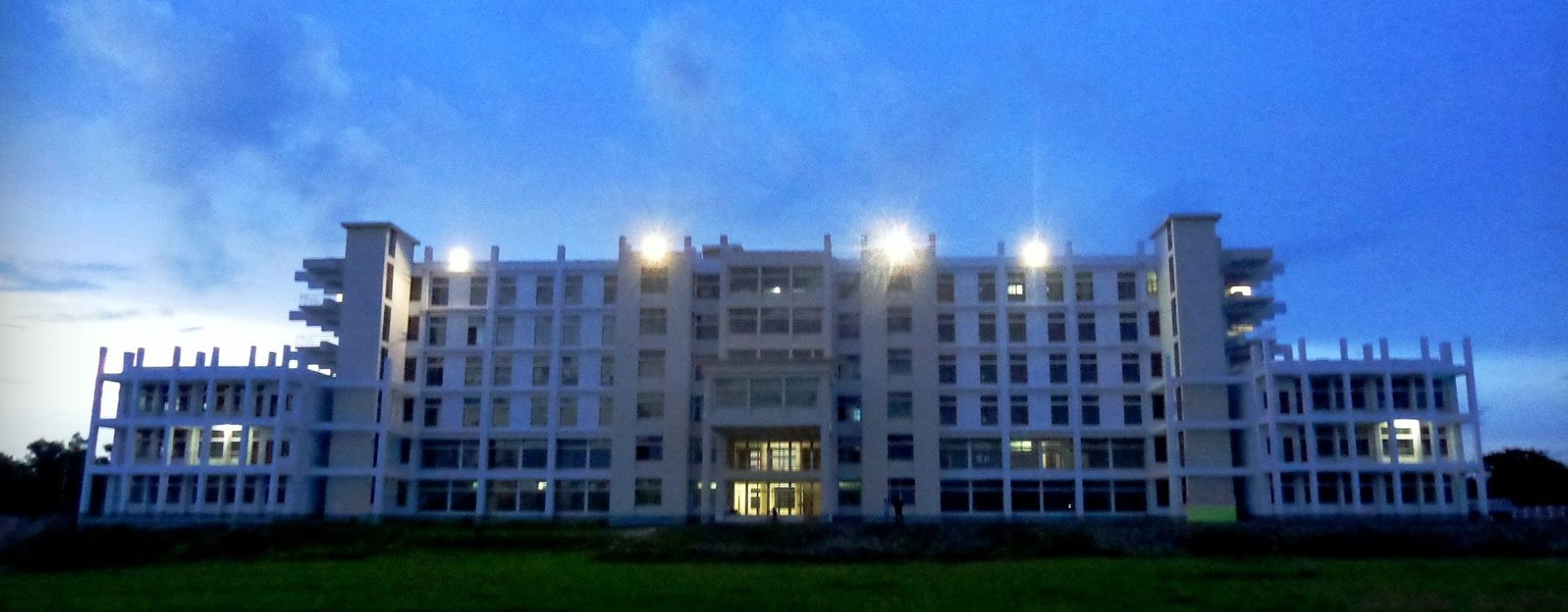
Noakhali Medical College was renamed in 2014 in honour of former minister of health Abdul Malek Ukil.

Abdul Malek Ukil Medical College is the only medical college in the district recognized by the Bangladesh Medical and Dental Council. Located in Begumganj, it is a public institution. Instruction began in 2009. Previously affiliated with the University of Chittagong, as of 2024 it is affiliated with Chittagong Medical University.

== Homeopathic colleges ==
Noakhali Mowlovi Abdur Rahman Homoeopathic Medical College is the only homeopathic college in the district recognized by the Bangladesh Homeopathic Board. It is located at Chowmuhani.

== Master's level colleges ==
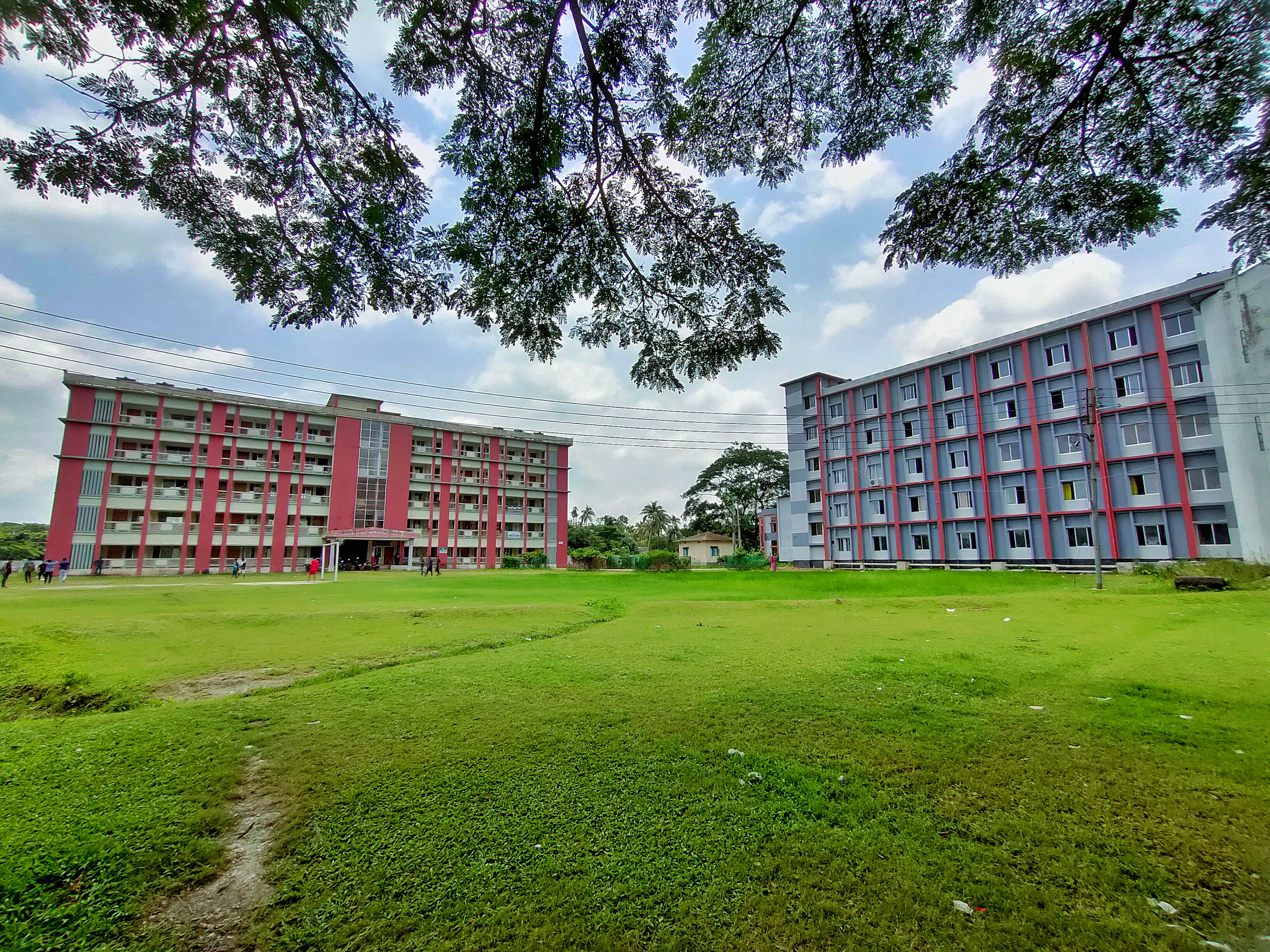
Noakhali Government College is one of two master's level colleges in the district.

There are two master's level colleges in the district. Chowmuhani Government Saleh Ahmed College in Gonipur, Begumganj Upazila, was established in 1943 as Chowmuhani College and was nationalized in 1984. Noakhali Government College in Maijdee Court, Noakhali, was established in 1963.

== Degree colleges (honors) ==
College	Location	Upazila	Management	Est.
Bandher Hat Abdul Malik College	Atashpur	Noakhali Sadar	Private	1975
Bhulua Degree College	Dhanyapur	Noakhali Sadar	Private	
Government Mujib College	Chorparborti Companigonj	Companiganj	Public	
Hatiya Dwip Government College	Char Kailash	Hatiya	Public	1970
Kabirhat Government College	Enayetpur	Kabirhat	Public	1967
Kankir Hat College	Matian	Senbagh	Private	1993
Khalilur Rahman Degree College	Amisha Para	Sonaimuri	Private	1973
M. A. Hashem College	Alaiarpur	Begumganj	Private	1996
Noakhali Government Women's College	Purba Laxmi Narayanpur	Noakhali Sadar	Public	1970
Saikat Government Degree College	Charbata	Subarnachar	Public	1996
Sonapur College	Sonapur	Noakhali Sadar	Private	1981

== Degree colleges (pass) ==
College	Location	Upazila	Management	Est.
Abdul Wahab Degree College	Morjad Para	Chatkhil	Private	
Bamni College	Rampur	Companiganj	Private	
Chaprashir Hat Ismail College	Upardilamchi	Kabirhat	Private	1995
Char Jabbar Degree College	Char Jubilee	Subarnachar	Private	1996
Char Matua College	Newazer Dogi	Noakhali Sadar	Private	1998
Chatkhil Panchgaon Mahbub Government College	Baraipara	Chatkhil	Public	1964
Chatkhil Women's College	Chatkhil	Chatkhil	Private	1995
Chowdhury Hat College	Char Parboti	Companiganj	Private	
Engineer Mohammad Fazlul Azim Mohila College	Charkailash	Hatiya	Private	
Hatiya Degree College	Saguriya	Hatiya	Private	1969
Jalal Uddin College	Alipur/Nazirpru	Begumganj	Private	1987
Nandia Para Bir Shrestha Shahid Md Ruhul Amin Degree College	Nandiapara	Sonaimuri	Private	1994
Senbag Government College	Chandpur	Senbagh	Public	1977
Sonaimuri College	Sonaimuri	Sonaimuri	Public	1970
Sultan Mahmud Degree College	Baliakandi	Senbagh	Private	1994

== Colleges ==
College	Location	Upazila	Management	Est.
Abdullah Miarhat College	Purba Rajurgon	Kabirhat	Private	
Ataur Rahman Bhuiyan College	Hossainpur	Sonaimuri	Private	
Destiny College	Char Torab Ali	Subarnachar	Private	
Dr Bashir Ahmed College	Bhatertek	Noakhali Sadar	Private	
Eastern College	Bir Srestha Ruhul Amin Sarok	Sonaimuri	Private	
Hatya Community College	Jahajmara	Hatiya	Private	
Jaitun Nahar Kader Mohila College	Char Hazari	Companiganj	Private	
Joyag College	Joyag	Sonaimuri	Private	
Lion Jahangir Alam Manik Mohila College	Sayestanagar	Senbagh	Private	
Maa College	Hugli	Noakhali Sadar	Private	
Maijdee Public College	Islamia Road	Noakhali Sadar	Private	
Major (Rtd) Abdul Mannan College	Porchim Char Uriya	Noakhali Sadar	Private	
National Model College	New Bus Stand	Noakhali Sadar	Private	
Noakhali City College Krishnarampur	Maijdee Court	Noakhali Sadar	Private	
Noakhali Model College	Purba Maijchar	Noakhali Sadar	Private	
Sompara College	Gopairbagh	Chatkhil	Private	
Upper Model College	Chowmuhani	Begumganj	Private	
Noakhali Biggan College EIIN:139939	Maijdee Court	Sadar	Private	2023

== Nursing colleges ==
There are two nursing colleges in the district recognized by the Bangladesh Nursing and Midwifery Council. The Nursing and Midwifery College in Maijdee Court, Noakhali, is public. Prime Model Nursing College, established in 2019 at Chowmuhani, is private.
