= Ekramul Karim Chowdhury =

Bangladeshi politician

- একরামুল করিম চৌধুরি

Member of the Bangladesh Parliament for Noakhali-4
- In office 25 January 2009 – 6 August 2024
- Preceded by: Md. Shahjahan

Personal details
- Born: 9 June 1962 (age 63) Noakhali, East Pakistan, Pakistan
- Party: Bangladesh Awami League
- Spouse: Kamrun Nahar Shiule
- Education: HSC

Ekramul Karim Chowdhury (born 9 June 1962) is a Bangladesh Awami League politician and a former member of parliament from Noakhali-4.

== Early life ==
Chowdhury was born on 9 June 1962 in Noakhali. He has studied up to Higher Secondary School Certificate.

== Career ==
Chowdhury was elected to parliament from Noakhali-4 as an Awami League candidate in 2008.

Chowdhury was re-elected in an uncontested election in 2014 which was boycotted by all major opposition parties.

Chowdhury was re-elected in 2018 as an Awami League candidate beating his nearest rival Md. Shahjahan of Bangladesh Nationalist Party.

On 23 June 2020 Chowdhury requested Prime Minister Sheikh Hasina to take action against the "Mithu Syndicate", led by Motazzaroul Islam Mithu, responsible for corruption in the healthcare industry of Bangladesh on Facebook live.

In July 2019, Chowdhury was criticised for posting photos of teenagers on Facebook he said were kissing in a public park and then handing them over to the police.

Chowdhury accused Obaidul Quader, general secretary of the Awami League of belonging to a family of razakars, those who fought against the independence of Bangladesh, in January 2021 on Facebook live. His comments were protested by Nagorik Samaj who called for an eight hour strike in Companiganj Upazila, Noakhali District.

On 20 February 2021, Chowdhury and Nizam Uddin Hazari supporters fought against the supports of Abdul Quader Mirza, younger brother of Obaidul Quader in Companiganj upazila. In the clashes 50 were injured of whom nine were hit by bullets. Quader Mirza blamed Chowdhury after an attack on his vehicle in February 2021.

On 6 March 2021, Chowdhury alleged that there was a conspiracy against the Noakhali District unit of the Awami League. He is the general secretary of Noakhali District unit of Awami League.

Chowdhury was detained in October 2024 after the fall of the Sheikh Hasina led Awami League government.

== Personal life ==
Ekram is married to Kamrun Nahar Shiule who is third time upazila chairman from Kabirhat, Noakhali. The couple has a son named Shabab Chowdhury. Shabab was allegedly driving when he ran over and killed a pedestrian on Mohakhali flyover in June 2018. Chowdhury denied his son was behind the wheels. The case over the incident did not proceed after Chowdhury paid two million taka compensation to the family of the victim. Shabab rear ended a police van in Chittagong on 13 July 2020 and got into an argument with the police officers at the location. No charges were filed and police officers claimed it was a "misunderstanding".
