= Noakhali-4 =

Constituency of Bangladesh's Jatiya Sangsad

Coordinates: 22.87°N 91.10°E

- Constituency for the Jatiya Sangsad
- District: Noakhali District
- Division: Chittagong Division
- Electorate: 544,740 (2018)

Current constituency
- Created: 1973
- Party: Bangladesh Nationalist Party
- Member: Md. Shahjahan
- ← 270 Noakhali-3 272 Noakhali-5 →

Noakhali-4 is a constituency represented in the Jatiya Sangsad (National Parliament) of Bangladesh since 2026 by Md. Shahjahan of the Bangladesh Nationalist Party.

== Boundaries ==
The constituency encompasses Subarnachar and Noakhali Sadar upazilas.

== History ==
The constituency was created for the first general elections in newly independent Bangladesh, held in 1973.

Ahead of the 2018 general election, the Election Commission expanded the boundaries of the constituency by adding two union parishads of Noakhali Sadar Upazila: Ashwadia and Niazpur.

== Members of Parliament ==
Election	Member	Party
1973	Abu Naser Chowdhury	Awami League
1979	K. M. Hossain	Bangladesh Nationalist Party
1986	Abdul Malek Ukil	Jatiya Samajtantrik Dal-JSD
1988	Fazle Elahi	Jatiya Party
1991	Md. Shahjahan	Bangladesh Nationalist Party
2008	Ekramul Karim Chowdhury	Awami League
2026	Md. Shahjahan	Bangladesh Nationalist Party

== Elections ==
=== Elections in the 2020s ===
General election 2026: Noakhali-4
Party	Candidate	Votes	%	±%
BSD (Marxist)	Bitul Chandra Majumder			
BNP	Md Shahjahan	219,182		
Jamaat	Md Isahak Khandakar	148,989		
IAB	Md Firoz Alam Masud			
JP(E)	Md Sariful Islam			
Majority				
Turnout				

=== Elections in the 2010s ===
Ekramul Karim Chowdhury was re-elected unopposed in the 2014 general election after opposition parties withdrew their candidacies in a boycott of the election.

=== Elections in the 2000s ===
General Election 2008: Noakhali-4
Party	Candidate	Votes	%	±%
AL	Ekramul Karim Chowdhury	131,706	46.0	+4.4
BNP	Md. Shahjahan	118,956	41.6	−13.9
BDB	Abdul Mannan	31,496	11.0	N/A
IAB	Abdul Hannan	1,356	0.5	N/A
CPB	Golam Akbar	1,010	0.4	N/A
BSD	Md. Daliler Rahman	860	0.3	N/A
Zaker Party	Md. Iktear Uddin	425	0.1	N/A
Independent	Khalidul Amin	336	0.1	N/A
Majority		12,750	4.5	−9.4
Turnout		286,145	84.3	+25.1
AL gain from BNP				

General Election 2001: Noakhali-4
Party	Candidate	Votes	%	±%
BNP	Md. Shahjahan	112,095	55.5	+9.6
AL	Golam Mohiuddin Latu	83,998	41.6	+1.8
IJOF	Md. Abdul Wadud Chowdhury	4,565	2.3	N/A
Bangladesh Samajtantrik Dal (Basad-Khalekuzzaman)	Md. Daliler Rahman	627	0.3	N/A
BKA	Hossain Ahammad	461	0.2	+0.1
Jatiya Party (M)	Md. Mosaddekur Rahman	145	0.1	N/A
Majority		28.097	13.9	+7.8
Turnout		201,891	59.2	0.0
BNP hold				

=== Elections in the 1990s ===
General Election June 1996: Noakhali-4
Party	Candidate	Votes	%	±%
BNP	Md. Shahjahan	61,632	45.9	+9.7
AL	Khairul Anam Salim	53,413	39.8	+8.0
Jamaat	Borhan Uddin	10,972	8.2	−9.4
JP(E)	Fazle Elahi	6,823	5.1	−7.7
IOJ	Mohammad Abdul Baset	368	0.3	N/A
Gano Forum	Salauddin Mahmud	305	0.2	N/A
Bangladesh Samajtantrik Dal (Basad-Khalekuzzaman)	Matin Uddin Ahmed	264	0.2	N/A
Zaker Party	Iqtiar Uddin Faruk	233	0.2	N/A
BKA	Hossain Ahmed Ukil	172	0.1	−0.5
Jatiya Samajtantrik Dal-JSD	Ataur Karim Faruk	113	0.1	N/A
Tahrikae Olama-i-Bangladesh	Md. Mostafa Bin Hossain	29	0.0	N/A
Majority		8,219	6.1	+1.7
Turnout		134,324	59.2	+25.9
BNP hold				

General Election 1991: Noakhali-4
Party	Candidate	Votes	%	±%
BNP	Md. Shahjahan	33,339	36.2	
AL	Golam Mohiuddin Latu	29,261	31.8	
Jamaat	Borhan Uddin	16,216	17.6	
JP(E)	Fazle Elahi	11,791	12.8	
BKA	Hossain Ahammad	543	0.6	
WPB	Aman Ullah Majhi	263	0.3	
BAKSAL	Sarwar-e-Deen	205	0.2	
Independent	Golam Mostafa	164	0.2	
Bangladesh Islamic Republican Party	Habib Ullah Chowdhury	138	0.1	
Bangladesh Muslim League (Kader)	Md. Abdul Momen	127	0.1	
NAP (Bhashani)	Mosle Uddin	52	0.1	
Majority		4,078	4.4	
Turnout		92,099	33.3	
BNP gain from JP(E)				
