= Kabirhat Upazila =

Kabirhat কবিরহাট
- Upazila
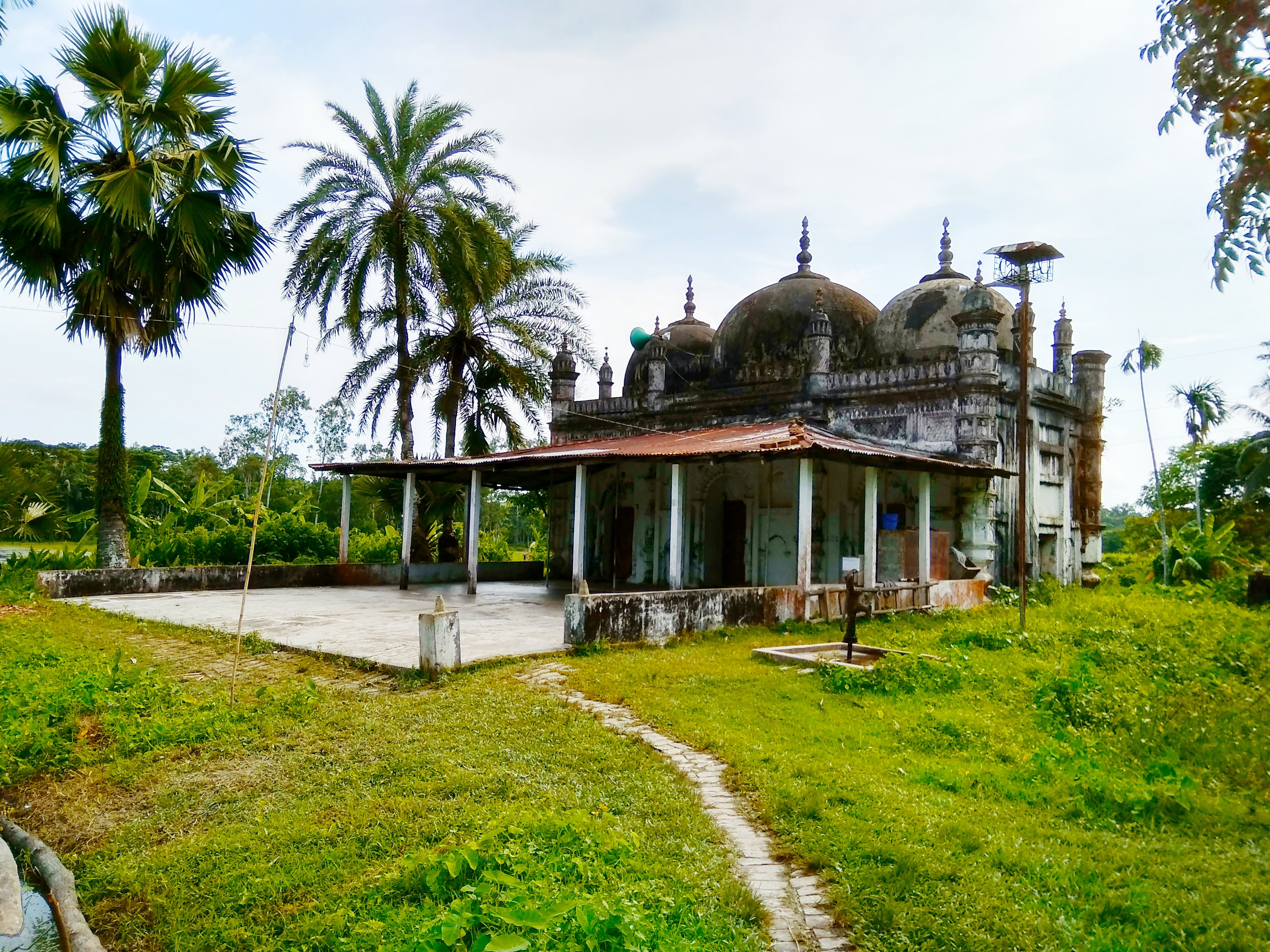
- Ramzan Mia Jame Masjid

- Coordinates: 22°50′N 91°12′E
- Country: Bangladesh
- Division: Chittagong
- District: Noakhali

Area
  - Total: 185.25 km^{2} (71.53 sq mi)

Population (2022)
  - Total: 238,736
  - Density: 1,288.7/km^{2} (3,337.8/sq mi)
- Time zone: UTC+6 (BST)
- Postal code: 3807
- Website: kabirhat.noakhali.gov.bd

Kabirhat Upazila mauza geocode map

Kabirhat (Bengali: কবিরহাট, romanized: Kobirhat) is an upazila of Noakhali District, located in Bangladesh's Chittagong Division. It is named after its administrative centre, the town of Kabirhat, and is the newest upazila of the district.

== History ==
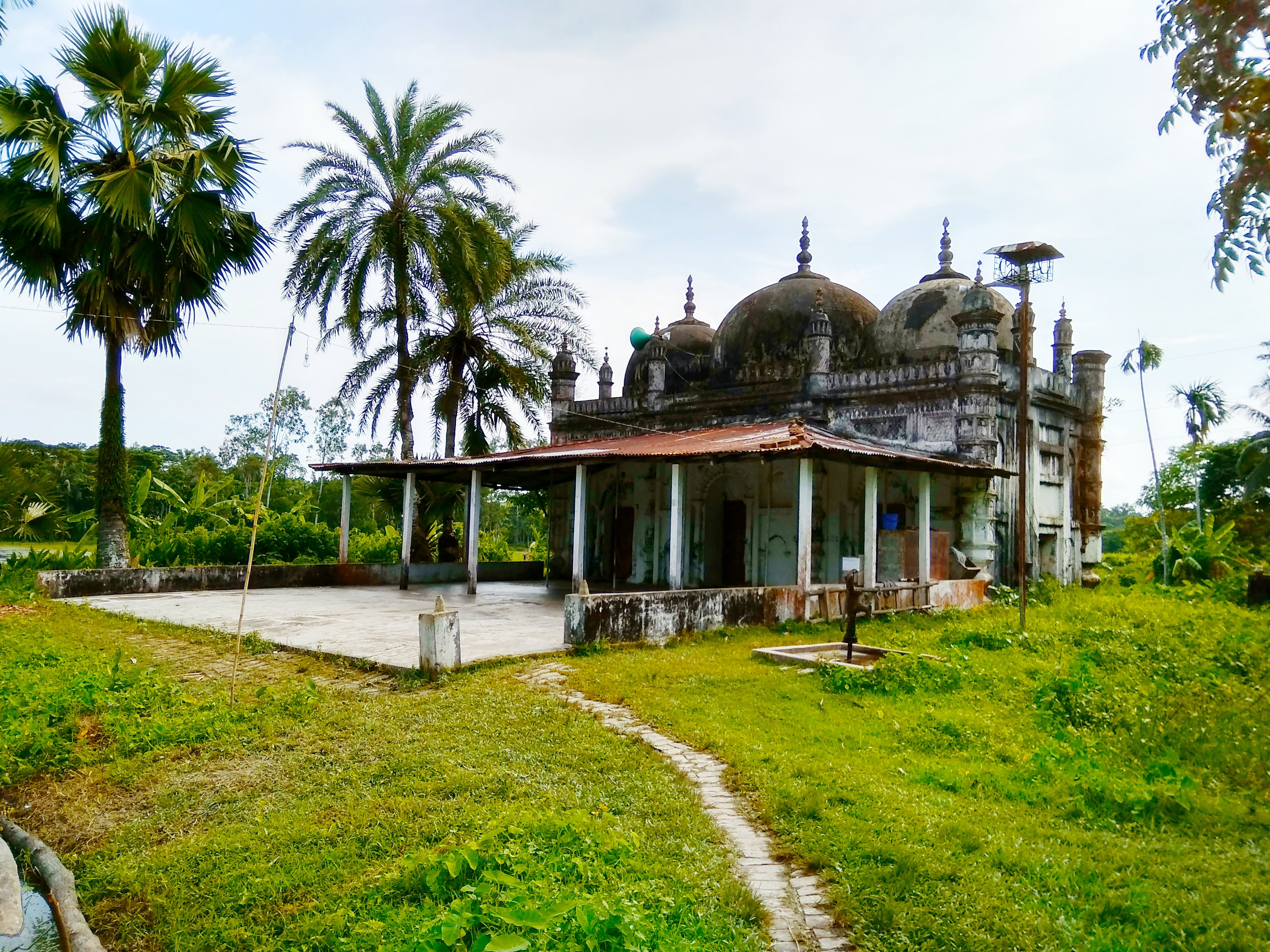
The historic Ramzan Mia Masjid.

It is said that the independent Sultan Fakhruddin Mubarak Shah, the first Muslim to conquer Chittagong, was born in Kabirhat. Under the Mughal Empire in circa 1770, Sheikh Nurullah Chaudhuri and Sheikh Mujirullah Chaudhuri established the three-domed Ramadan Miah Mosque. The antique mosque is located in the village of Dawlat Ramdi in Bataiya Union. The Hoiya Miah Mosque is also a notable three-domed mosque in the area. The Sufi dervish Chhankhola was active in Kabirhat and he was buried in a mazar (mausoleum) in Narottampur. The Kabirhat Madrasa was established in 1905.

In circa 1895, a prominent businessman of Ward 2 by the name of Kabir Patwari opened a shop near his house yard. He later extended his shop further north to meet the needs of the people of the area. A haat bazaar was eventually established and every Friday and Tuesday, the people of the area start coming there for their daily necessities. In this way, the market came to be known as Kabir-Hat. Kabir Patwary Jami Mosque in Ghoshbagh is a notable mosque in the area too.

The 1970 Bhola cyclone heavily affected Kabirhat in every sector. During the Bangladesh War of 1971, the local Razakars established a camp at the Kabirhat High School. The school was used a slaughter place and a ditch was dug on the eastern part of the high school. The Pakistan Army and the Razakars plundered Company Hat and set fire to houses in the village of Alipur in Ghoshbagh on 27 September. On 17 October, the Bengali pro-independence militants raided Jalil's house, killing him and his associates who were local supporters of the Pakistan Army.

Kabirhat suffered from another cyclone in 1991. On 6 August 2006, the Kabirhat Upazila (sub-district) was formed from some unions of Noakhali Sadar Upazila.

== Geography ==
Kabirhat Upazila has an area of 185.25 square kilometres (71.53 sq mi). It borders Begumganj and Senbagh upazilas to the north, Companiganj Upazila to the east and south, and Noakhali Sadar Upazila to the west. The Noakhali Canal flows north through the upazila.

== Demographics ==
Religions in Kabirhat Upazila (2022)
Religion	Percent
Islam	95.71%
Hinduism	4.21%
Other or not stated	0.08%

According to the 2022 Bangladeshi census, Kabirhat Upazila had 49,251 households and a population of 238,736. 11.10% of the population were under 5 years of age. Kabirhat had a literacy rate (age 7 and over) of 75.76%: 76.66% for males and 74.91% for females, and a sex ratio of 95.31 males for every 100 females. 27,068 (11.34%) lived in urban areas.

As of the 2011 Census of Bangladesh, Kabirhat Upazila had 36,054 households and a population of 196,944. 55,331 (28.09%) were under 10 years of age. Kabirhat had a literacy rate (age 7 and over) of 48.99%, compared to the national average of 51.8%, and a sex ratio of 1127 females per 1000 males. 17,448 (8.86%) of the population lived in urban areas.

== Administration ==
UNO: Muhammad Sarwar Uddin.

Kabirhat Upazila is divided into Kabirhat Municipality and seven union parishads: Batiaya, Chap Rashirhat, Dhan Shalik, Dhan Siri, Ghoshbagh, Narottampur, and Sundalpur. The union parishads are subdivided into 68 mauzas and 68 villages.

Kabirhat Municipality is subdivided into 9 wards and 11 mahallas.

== Education ==
Kabirhat Government College and Chaprashir Hat College are there. Chaprashirhat high school is the pioneer school in Kabirhat and was rewarded by Upazila and District Education office.

Fazil Madrasha is one of the oldest Madrassas of the country. It was formally established in 1901, but began operating after 1880.

== Notable people ==
- Abdus Shakur, litterateur
- Fakhruddin Mubarak Shah, independent Sultan of Sonargaon
- Rumman Bin Wali Sabbir, footballer

== See also ==
- Upazilas of Bangladesh
- Districts of Bangladesh
- Divisions of Bangladesh
