= K. M. Hossain =

Bangladeshi politician

Member of Parliament for Noakhali-4
- In office 18 February 1979 – 12 February 1982
- Preceded by: Abu Naser Chowdhury
- Succeeded by: Abdul Malek Ukil

Member of Parliament for Noakhali-1
- In office 1988–1990

Personal details
- Born: 1 January 1929 (age 97) Kesharpar, Senbagh thana, British India
- Party: Bangladesh Nationalist Party

K. M. Hossain is a Bangladesh Nationalist Party politician and a former member of parliament for Noakhali-4 and Noakhali-1.

== Biography ==
K. M. Hossain was born on 1 January 1929 in Kesharpar village of what is now Senbagh Upazila, Noakhali District, Bangladesh.

Hossain was elected to parliament from Noakhali-4 as a Bangladesh Nationalist Party candidate in 1979. He was elected to parliament from Noakhali-1 as a Jatiya Party candidate in a 1988 by-election.
