= Subarnachar Upazila =

Subarnachar সুবর্ণচর
- Upazila
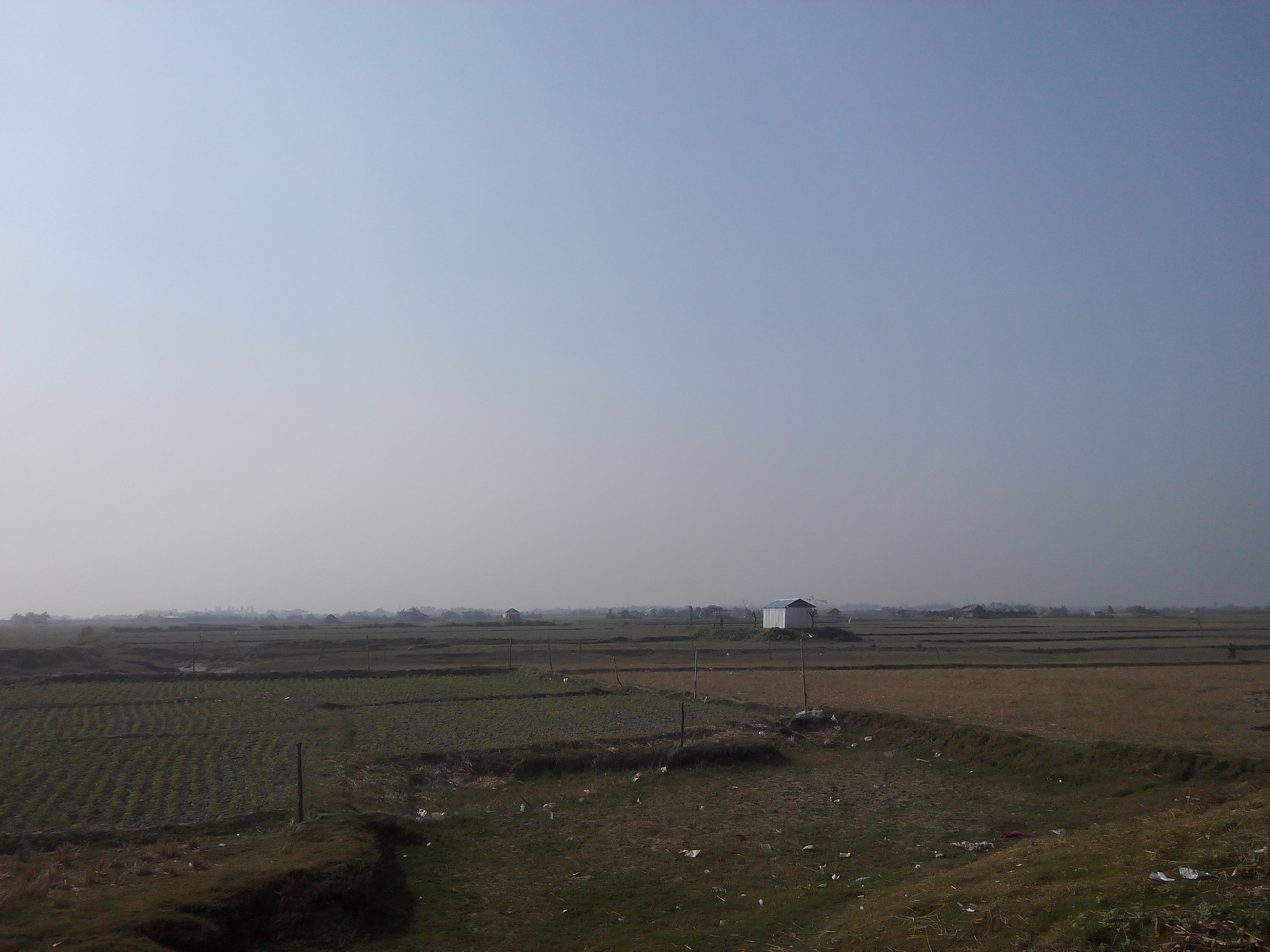
- Lokkhirchar, Subarnachar upazila, Noakhali district

- Coordinates: 22°41′N 91°6.6′E
- Country: Bangladesh
- Division: Chittagong
- District: Noakhali

Government
  - MP (Noakhali-4): Md. Shahjahan

Area
  - Total: 575.47 km^{2} (222.19 sq mi)

Population (2022)
  - Total: 355,910
  - Density: 618.47/km^{2} (1,601.8/sq mi)
- Time zone: UTC+6 (BST)
- Postal code: 3812 (Charjabbar)
- Postal code: 3813 (Charbata)
- Website: subarnachar.noakhali.gov.bd(in Bengali)

Subarnachar Upazila mauza geocode map

Subarnachar (Bengali: সুবর্ণচর, romanized: Shubornochor) is an upazila (sub-district) of Noakhali District, located in Bangladesh's Chittagong Division. The Bhulua River and Sandwip Channel flows through it.

== History ==
The islands in the upazila formed in 1959 and many poor migrants started settling there. This was followed by a land dispute in 1986 with foreign land grabbing forces. The clashes killed hundreds of people and destroyed thousands of homes. The settlers of Subarnachar sacrificed many precious lives to survive on that day. The history of this upazila has been written through the relentless struggle of the working people who have made this salty char habitable through their creative activities. Subarnachar has suffered from flooding in many occasions such as on 12 November 1970 as well as in 1985, 1991 and 1998. Subarnachar was given upazila status on 2 April 2005, taking 7 unions from Noakhali Sadar Upazila.

== Demographics ==
Religions in Subarnachar Upazila (2022)
Religion	Percent
Islam	93.98%
Hinduism	6.00%
Other or not stated	0.02%

According to the 2022 Bangladeshi census, Subarnachar Upazila had 73,578 households and a population of 355,910. 13.71% of the population were under 5 years of age. Subarnachar had a literacy rate (age 7 and over) of 63.63%: 63.62% for males and 63.65% for females, and a sex ratio of 97.65 males for every 100 females. 22,829 (6.41%) lived in urban areas.

According to the 2011 Census of Bangladesh, Subarnachar Upazila had 55,399 households and a population of 289,514. 94,114 (32.51%) were under 10 years of age. Subarnachar had a literacy rate (age 7 and over) of 32.66%, compared to the national average of 51.8%, and a sex ratio of 1017 females per 1000 males. 6,651 (2.30%) lived in urban areas.

A number of Subarnachar residents have migrated to Oman where they form a small diaspora community.

== Administration ==
Subarnachar Upazila is divided into eight union parishads: Charamanullah, Charbata, Charjabbar, Charjubilee, Charklark, Charwapda, East Charbata, and Mohammadpur. The union parishads are subdivided into 52 mauzas and 53 villages.

=== Upazila Chairmen ===
Name	Term
AFM Fakhrul Islam Munshi	1985-1986
Abul Bashar Bhuiyan	1986-1991
Mozammel Hossain Anik	Present

== Education ==
The average literacy rate of Subarnachar is 32.83%; with males at 37.50% and females at 28.15%. There are many notable institutions in Subarnachar. There are 241 mosques and 12 madrasas including the Char Jubilee Rabbania Fazil Madrasa and the Char Bata Islamia Alim Madrasa.

== See also ==
- Upazilas of Bangladesh
- Districts of Bangladesh
- Divisions of Bangladesh
- Administrative geography of Bangladesh
