= Abu Naser Chowdhury =

Bangladeshi politician

Member of Bangladesh Parliament
- In office 1973–1979
- Succeeded by: K. M. Hossain

Personal details
- Political party: Bangladesh Awami League
- Website: naserchowdhury.com

Abu Naser Chowdhury is a Bangladesh Awami League politician and a former member of parliament for Noakhali-4.

== Career ==
He was elected to parliament from Noakhali-4 as a Bangladesh Awami League candidate in 1973.
