= Fazle Elahi =

Bangladeshi freedom fighter and politician (died 2018)

Member of Parliament for Noakhali-4
- In office 1988–1990
- Preceded by: Abdul Malek Ukil
- Succeeded by: Md. Shahjahan

Personal details
- Party: Jatiya Party

Fazle Elahi was a Bangladeshi freedom fighter and politician from Noakhali belonging to Jatiya Party. He was a member of the Jatiya Sangsad.

== Biography ==
Elahi was a freedom fighter. He was an organizer of the Liberation War of Bangladesh too. He established Sonapur Degree College and Sonapur Collegiate School. He was elected as a member of the Jatiya Sangsad from Noakhali-4 in 1988.

Elahi died on 13 August 2018 at the age of 63.
