= Abdus Shakur (writer) =

Bangladeshi litterateur, musicologist and rose expert

- Born: 25 February 1941; Kabirhat, Noakhali, Bengal Presidency
- Died: 15 January 2013 (aged 71); Dhaka, Bangladesh
- Resting place: Martyred Intellectuals' Graveyard, Mirpur
- Citizenship: Bangladeshi
- Education: University of Dhaka
- Occupations: Litterateur, Musicologist
- Writing career
- Language: Bengali
- Notable awards: Bangla Academy Literary Award (1979); Ekushey Padak (2010)

Abdus Shakur (25 February 1941 – 15 January 2013) was a Bangladeshi litterateur and musicologist. He was awarded Ekushey Padak by the Government of Bangladesh in 2014 for his contribution to language and literature.

== Education and career ==
Abdus Shakur completed his BA (honors) and MA degree in English literature from Dhaka University in 1963 and 1964 respectively. In 1980 he earned another master's degree in development economics from the Netherlands.

Abdus Shakur started his career at Dhaka University as a lecturer in the English department. Later he joined the Pakistan Civil Service.

In 2000, he retired as a Secretary of the Government of Bangladesh.

== Literature ==
Abdus Shakur's book "Bangalir Muktir Gaan" received Bangla Academy Award in 2007.

== Awards ==
- Bangla Academy Literary Award (1979)
- Amiobhushon Award (2003)
- Alokto Sahitya Puroshkar (2008)
- Ekushey Padak (2014)
