= Ramzan Miah Mosque =

Mosque in Noakhali, Bangladesh

Ramadan Miah Mosque
- রমজান মিয়া জামে মসজিদ
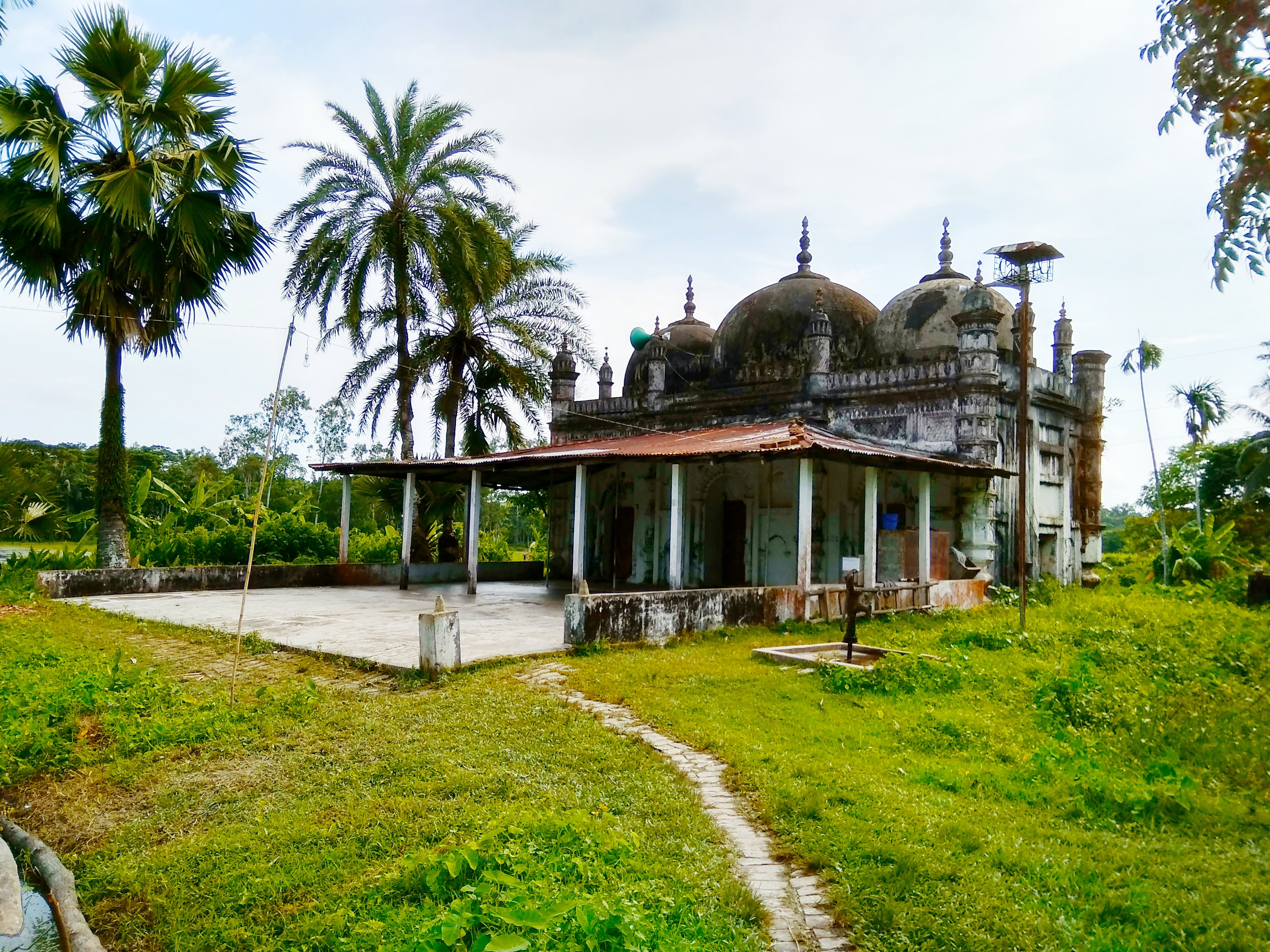

- Location of the mosque in Bangladesh

Religion
- Affiliation: Sunni Islam
- Ecclesiastical or organizational status: Friday mosque
- Status: Active

Location
- Location: Kabirhat, Noakhali District
- Country: Bangladesh
- Interactive map of Ramadan Miah Mosque
- Coordinates: 22°51′08″N 91°13′58″E

Architecture
- Architect: Ramadan Miah
- Type: Mosque architecture
- Style: Islamic
- Founder: Shaykh Noor Ullah Chowdhury; Shaykh Mujeer Ullah Chowdhury
- Completed: 1770

Specifications
- Capacity: 600 worshipers
- Dome: Three
- Materials: Brick

The Ramzan Miah Jame Mosque (Bengali: রমজান মিয়া জামে মসজিদ, Arabic: جامع رمضان میاں), and more popularly known as the Chowdhury Mosjid (Bengali: চৌধুরী মসজিদ), is a Sunni Friday mosque, located in the Noakhali District of Bangladesh. The mosque is situated in the village of Daulat Ramdi, located in Kabirhat Upazila's No. 7 Bataiya Union Parishad.

== Overview ==
Built in 1770 CE, during the Mughal era, the existence of the mosque was not widely known to the general public until it was brought forward to Kabirhat's upazila nirbahi officer, Shariful Islam. The three-domed mosque was established by Shaykh Noor Ullah Chowdhury and Shaykh Mujeer Ullah Chowdhury, the ancestors of the current chairman of the mosque, Khwaja Mu'in ad-Din Chowdhury.

== Gallery ==
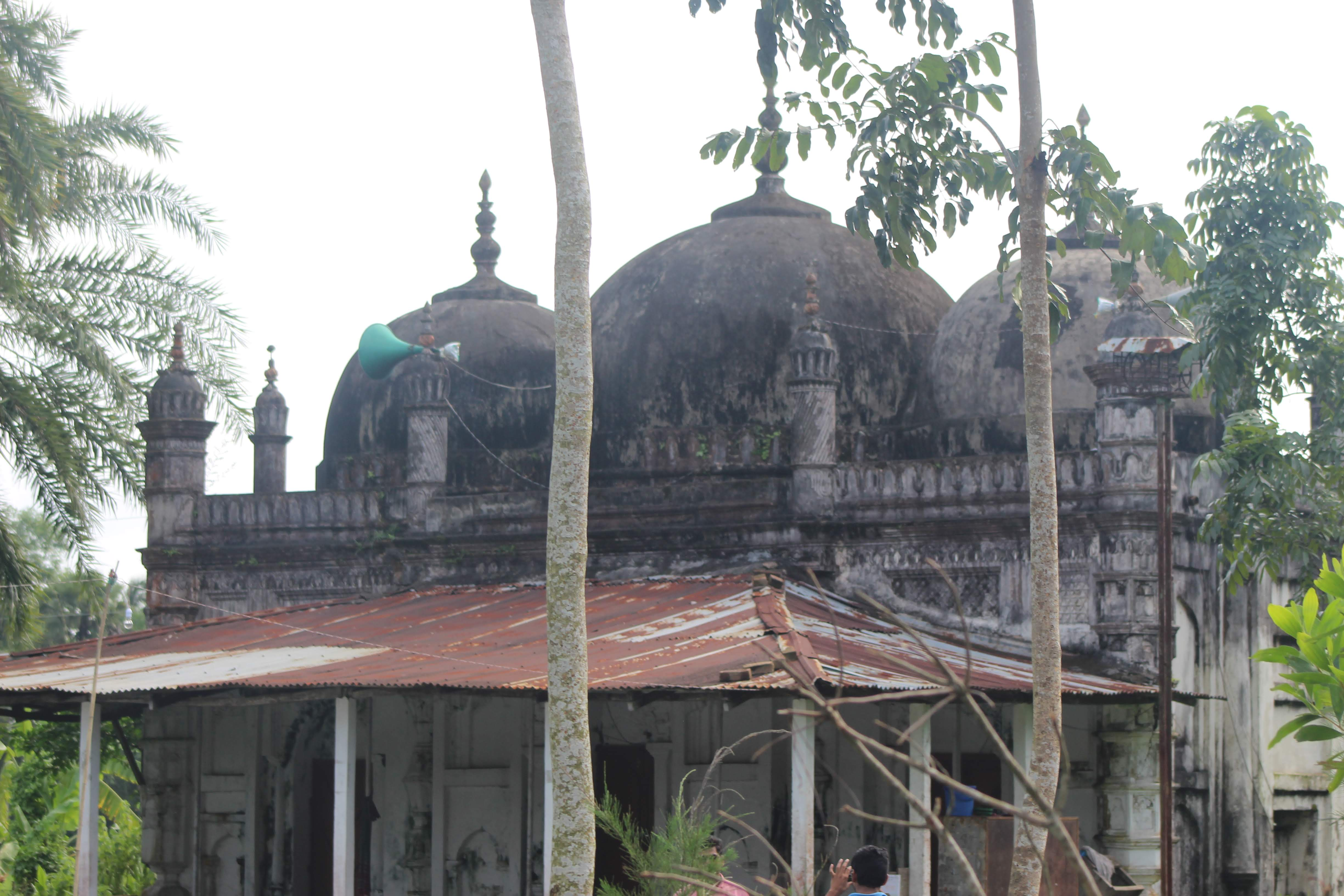
The upper part of the mosque

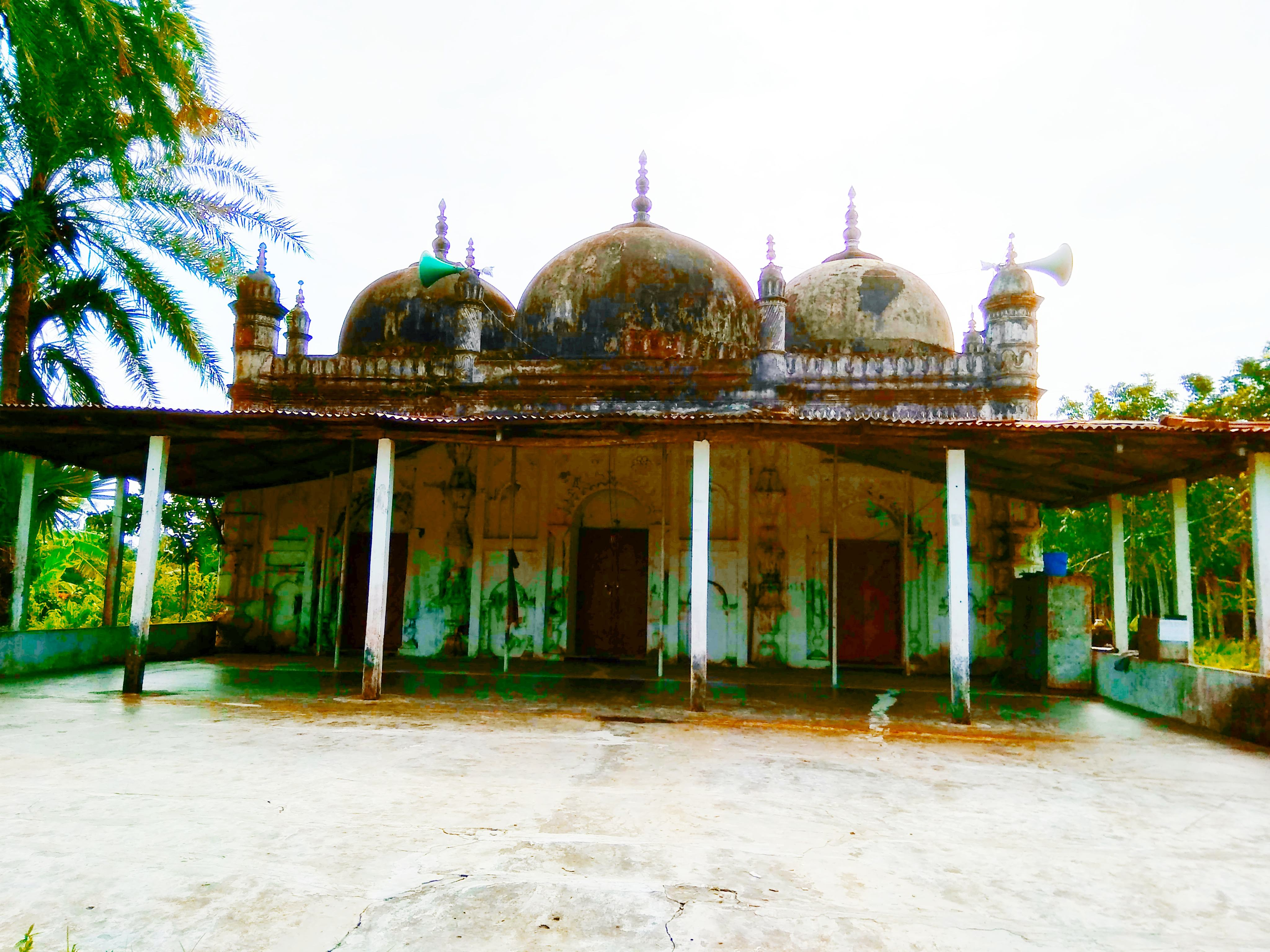

== See also ==
- Islam in Bangladesh
- List of mosques in Bangladesh
