= Mahfuz Ullah =

Bangladeshi writer and environmentalist (1950–2019)

- মাহফুজ উল্লাহ
- Born: 10 March 1950; Noakhali, East Bengal, Dominion of Pakistan
- Died: 27 April 2019 (aged 69); Bangkok, Thailand
- Education: Dhaka College; University of Dhaka
- Occupations: Journalist, television personality, environmentalist
- Relatives: Muzaffar Ahmed (grandfather)
- Awards: Ekushey Padak (2025)

Mahfuz Ullah (10 March 1950 – 27 April 2019) was a Bangladeshi writer, journalist, television personality and environmentalist. He was notable for environmental journalism in Bangladesh. He was the founding Secretary General of the Center for Sustainable Development - (CFSD).

== Early life ==
Mahfuz Ullah was born on 10 March 1950 at Begumganj Upazila in Noakhali District of the then East Bengal to Habibullah and Foyzunnisa Begum. He was the grandson of Muzaffar Ahmed, one of the socialist movement activists in the Indian subcontinent. He obtained his master's in physics in 1972 and again in journalism in 1974 from the University of Dhaka. Because of his involvement in student politics, Ayub Khan's military backed government expelled him from Dhaka College.

Mahfuz Ullah was involved with East Pakistan Students Union and served as its president. He participated in 1969 Mass uprising.

== Career ==
Mahfuz Ullah started his career in journalism when he was a student. He had been associated with Weekly Bichitra since its inception in 1972. He worked as a language expert of China matters and Press Officer at the Deputy High Commission of Bangladesh in Kolkata. He was a visiting teacher at the Department of Mass Communication and Journalism of Dhaka University. Mahfuz Ullah had hosted radio and television shows and been involved with leading Bangla and English dailies in Bangladesh. He was also an adjunct professor at the Department of Journalism and Mass Communication of Daffodil International University.

Mahfuz Ullah was the founder secretary general of an environmental organization named Center for Sustainable Development. He was elected as the first Bangladeshi member of the International Board of Directors of the International Union for Conservation of Nature.

== Books ==
Mahfuz Ullah wrote and edited more than 50 books. Some of his notable works include the biographies of former President Ziaur Rahman and former Prime Minister Khaleda Zia, the mass uprising of 1969 and the insurgency in Assam and post-independent Bangladesh.

== Death ==
Mahfuz Ullah died on 27 April 2019 at the age of 69 at Bumrungrad International Hospital in Bangkok, Thailand.
