= Senbagh Upazila =

Upazila in Noakhali District, Chittagong Division, Bangladesh

Senbag সেনবাগ
- Upazila
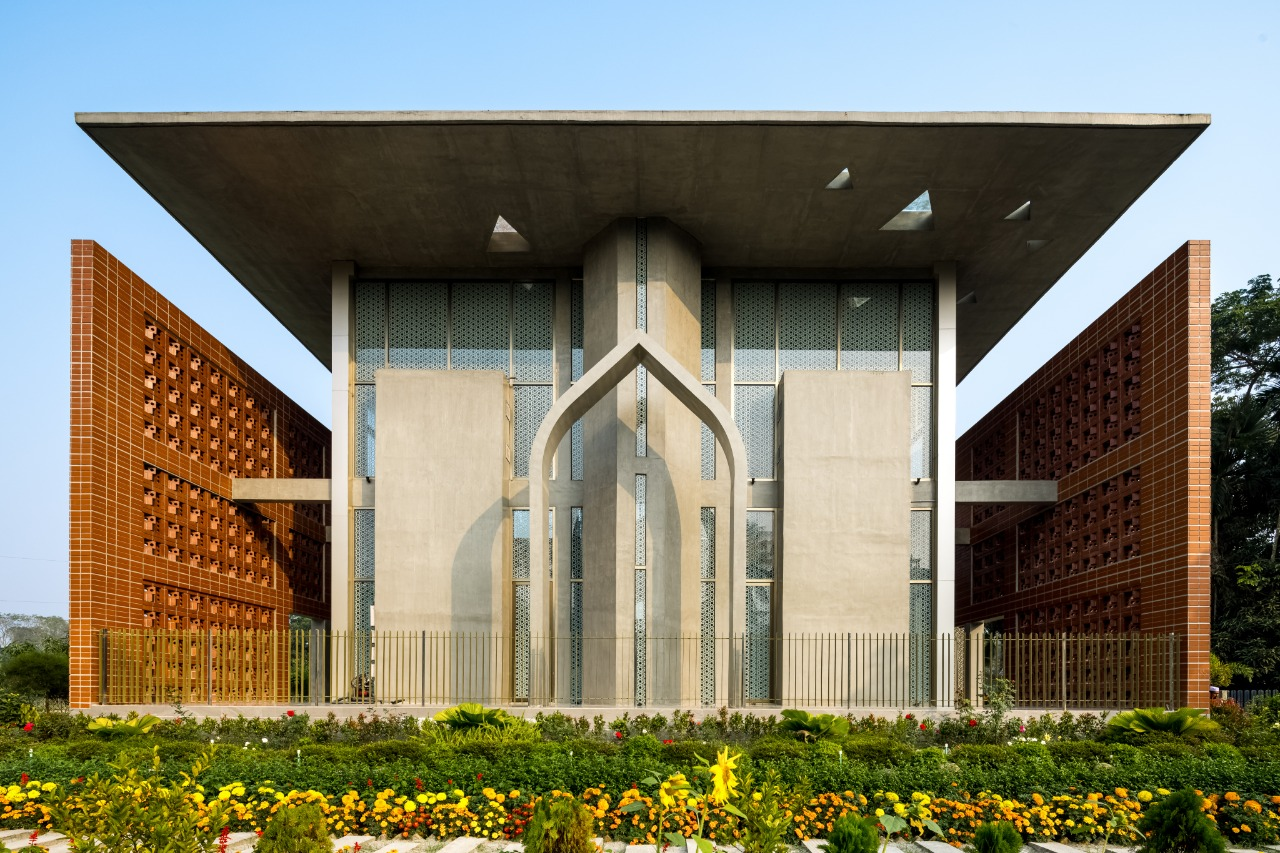
- Nolua Miah Bari Jame Masjid

- Coordinates: 22°59′N 91°14′E
- Country: Bangladesh
- Division: Chittagong
- District: Noakhali
- Headquarters: Senbagh
- Thana: 1922
- Upazila: 1983

Government
  - Upazila Chairman: Vacant
  - MP (Noakhali-2): Morshed Alam

Area
  - Total: 159.36 km^{2} (61.53 sq mi)

Population (2022)
  - Total: 310,884
  - Density: 1,950.8/km^{2} (5,052.6/sq mi)
- Time zone: UTC+6 (BST)
- Postal code: 3860
- Area code: 03225
- Website: senbug.noakhali.gov.bd(in Bengali)

Senbagh Upazila mauza geocode map

Senbagh (Bengali: সেনবাগ), also spelt Senbag and Senbug, is an upazila of Noakhali District. It is named after its administrative centre, the municipality of Senbagh.

== Geography ==
Senbagh is located at 22.9833°N 91.2333°E. It has a total area of 155.83 square kilometres (60.2 sq mi). It is enclosed by Nangalkot Upazila (to the north), Noakhali Sadar and Companiganj upazilas (south), Daganbhuiyan Upazila (east), with Begumganj and Laksam Upazila (to the west).

== History ==
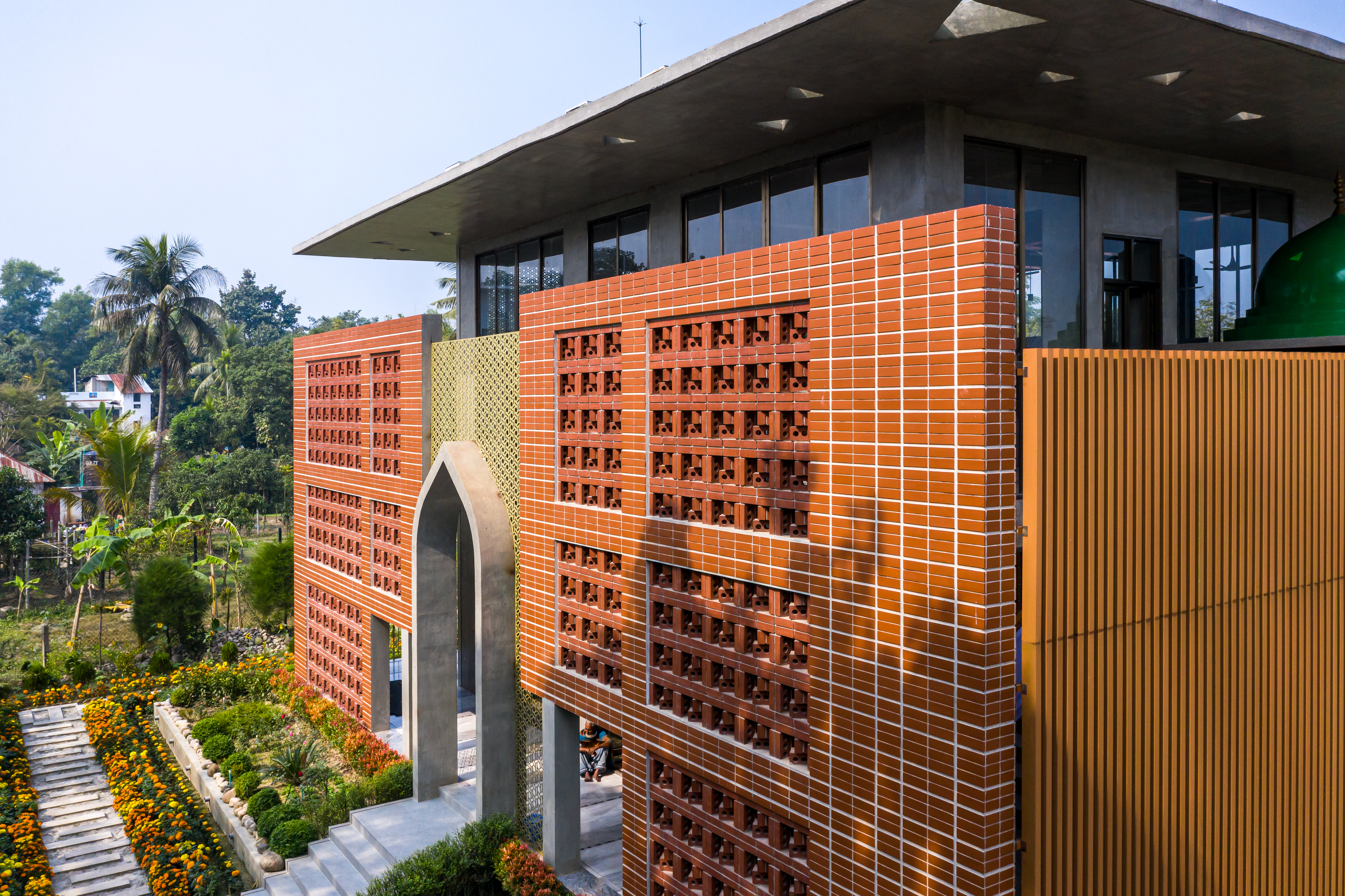
The Miah Bari Masjid in the village of Nolua was rebuilt and relocated on 18 September 2020 by Noor A Alam Chowdhury, a descendant of Shamsuddin Miaji who founded the Masjid in 1839.

Senbagh was formerly under the jurisdiction of Begumganj Thana. However, it was not possible to maintain law and order in the northeast of this area as it was far away from the police station at Begumganj. Thus, a small outpost was established in the village of Senbagh, near the Baghra Dighi. The early 20th century marked an important part in the educational development of Senbagh. The Jainagar Wajidiyyah Alim Madrasa was established in 1900, and two years later, the Samir Munshir Hat Dakhil Madrasa was established. Another Dakhil madrasa, the Kadra Hamidiyyah Madrasa was founded in 1919. In 1922, Senbagh was officially established as a thana with Mirganj Bazar as its headquarters. Mirganj Bazar later came to be known as Senbagh Bazar. During the Bangladesh Liberation War of 1971, freedom fighters set up a training camp in Kankirhat while the Pakistan Army camp was situated at Domnakandi Primary School. A fight emerged between the two factions in the latter camp where several freedom fighters were killed. Its status was upgraded to upazila (sub-district) in 1983, as part of the President of Bangladesh Hussain Muhammad Ershad's decentralisation programme.

== Demographics ==
Religions in Senbagh Upazila (2022)
Religion	Percent
Islam	96.49%
Hinduism	3.45%
Other or not stated	0.06%

According to the 2022 Bangladeshi census, Senbag Upazila had 67,665 households and a population of 310,884. 11.30% of the population were under 5 years of age. Senbag had a literacy rate (age 7 and over) of 80.26%: 81.49% for males and 79.32% for females, and a sex ratio of 81.17 males for every 100 females. 42,463 (13.66%) lived in urban areas.

According to the 2011 Census of Bangladesh, Senbagh Upazila had 53,943 households and a population of 282,894. 68,607 (24.25%) were under 10 years of age. Senbagh had a literacy rate (age 7 and over) of 56.67%, compared to the national average of 51.8%, and a sex ratio of 1122 females per 1000 males. 26,807 (9.48%) lived in urban areas.

As of the 1991 Bangladesh census, Senbagh has a population of 216,309. Males are 48.24% of the population, and females 51.76%. This Upazila's eighteen-and-older population is 100,117. Senbagh has an average literacy rate of 43.5% (7+ years), and the national average of 32.4% literate.

The total area of the town is 15.7 square kilometres (6.1 sq mi), and the population is 23,530: male 49.34%, female 50.66%; population density per km^{2} 1499. The literacy rate among the town's people is 49.3%.

== Administration ==
UNO: Zissan Bin Mazed.

Senbagh Upazila is divided into Senbagh Municipality and nine union parishads: Arjuntala, Bejbagh, Chhatarpaia, Dumurua, Kabilpur, Kadra, Kesharpar, Mohammadpur, and Nabipur. Senbagh town consists of six mouzas. The union parishads are subdivided into 97 mauzas and 105 villages. Senbagh Municipality is subdivided into nine wards and fifteen mahallas.

=== Chairmen ===
List of chairmen
Name	Village	Term
Muhammad Ismail Miah	Baliakandi	1985-1986
Abul Kalam Azad	Bijbagh	1986-1990
Qazi Muhammad Mafizur Rahman	Parikot	2009-2014
Abul Kalam Azad	Bijbagh	2015
Jafar Ahmad Chowdhury		Present

- Women's Vice Chairman: Marium Sultana
- Vice Chairman: Golam kobir
- Upazila Nirbahi Officer (UNO): Zisaan Bin Mazed

== Facilities ==
Senbagh Upazila has 312 mosques and 14 temples. Many of the mosques are notable tourist attractions in Senbagh due to their antiquity or architectural style. These include the Hakkani Mosque in Kabilpur, the Senbagh Bazar Jame Masjid, Miah Bari Jame Masjid of Nolua, Kosha Ghazi's Mosque, Silonia Jame Mosque, and Samir Munshir Hat Mosque. Other notable tourist sites include Qadra's Fort, Pir Anis Bhuiyan Shaheb's Jame Mosque, Bhuiyan's Dighi, the mazar (mausoleum) of Ghazi Yaqub Ali in Nalua and the dargah of the Five Pirs.

The upazila is home to other facilities such as the Parikot Orphanage headed by Qazi Mafizur Rahman.

== Education ==
The average literacy is 70.3%: male 50.3% and female 20.0%. Educational institutions include: one government college, two non-government colleges, two government high schools, 23 non-government high schools, 19 madrasas, 79 government primary schools, and 41 non-government primary school. Cultural organisations include: 17 rural club, one cinema hall, and 14 playground. The main occupations are: agriculture 30.14%, agricultural labourer 16.66%, wage labourer 1.96%, commerce 10.99%, service 23.54%, transport 2.52% and others 14.19%. About 1,000 women and girls received sewing training from MAAWS Sewing Training Institute by June 2011. MAAWS also founded a computer training school at village Yarpur in Senbagh. There is a village in Domoria union named Gazir Hat where a high school (Gazir Hat High School), a primary school, (Domoria Primary School) etc., (the Akbor Ali Khan College). There is a village in Kadra union named Mogua where a high school, a primary school, and a vocational high school are situated. Freedom Fighter M A Azim Chowdhury is one of the founders and former headmaster of M A Ali High School and Vocational High School in Mogua Village. Domoura and Mogua village are most popular in Senbagh upazila. There have a model many model village, one of them is Chandpur. Chandpur has many educational institutes. Chandpur Model High School is a famous educational institute. It was established in 1992.

There is a standard educational institution called Fayzunnesa Ibtedaye Model Madrasah which was established in 2019.

== Notable people ==
- AH Muhammad Tawhidul Anwar Chowdhury, gynaecologist and obstetrician
- Muhammad Amirul Islam, pioneer of agriculture and soil management in Bangladesh
- Zainul Abdin Farroque, politician

== See also ==
- Upazilas of Bangladesh
- Districts of Bangladesh
- Divisions of Bangladesh
