= Md. Shahjahan =

Bangladeshi politician

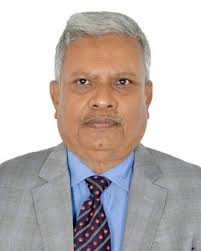

Member of the Bangladesh Parliament for Noakhali-4
- Incumbent
- Assumed office 16 February 2026
- Preceded by: Ekramul Karim Chowdhury
- In office 20 March 1991 – 29 October 2006
- Preceded by: Fazle Elahi
- Succeeded by: Ekramul Karim Chowdhury

Personal details
- Party: Bangladesh Nationalist Party

Md. Shahjahan is a Bangladesh Nationalist Party politician and a former member of parliament for Noakhali-4.

== Career ==
Shahjahan was elected to parliament from Noakhali-4 as a Bangladesh Nationalist Party candidate in 2001. He was arrested on 8 March 2015 by the Rapid Action Battalion for being involved in a conspiracy against the Bangladeshi government. In November 2015, he was tasked with nominating Bangladesh Nationalist Party candidates for municipal elections. He is a vice-chairman of Bangladesh Nationalist Party. In 2016, he resigned from his post of presidency of the Noakhali District unit of Bangladesh Nationalist Party.
