= Abdul Malek Ukil =

Bangladeshi lawyer and politician (1924–1987)

- আব্দুল মালেক উকিল

3rd Speaker of the Jatiya Sangsad
- In office 27 January 1974 – 6 November 1975
- Preceded by: Mohammad Mohammadullah
- Succeeded by: Mirza Ghulam Hafiz

Minister of Home Affairs
- In office 16 January 1973 – 1 February 1974
- Preceded by: Abdul Mannan
- Succeeded by: Muhammad Mansur Ali

Minister of Health and Family Welfare
- In office 13 April 1972 – 16 March 1973
- Preceded by: Zahur Ahmad Chowdhury
- Succeeded by: Abdul Mannan

7th President of Awami League
- In office 16 February 1978 – 16 February 1981
- General Secretary: Abdur Razzaq
- Preceded by: Syeda Zohra Tajuddin (Convenor)
- Succeeded by: Sheikh Hasina

Member of Parliament
- In office 7 May 1986 – 17 October 1987
- Preceded by: K. M. Hossain
- Succeeded by: Fazle Elahi
- Constituency: Noakhali-4
- In office 7 March 1973 – 6 November 1975
- Preceded by: Position Established
- Succeeded by: Shafiq Ullah
- Constituency: Noakhali-12

Member of Constituent Assembly of Bangladesh
- In office 10 April 1972 – 16 December 1972
- Preceded by: Position Established
- Succeeded by: Position Abolished

Personal details
- Born: 1 October 1924 Noakhali, Bengal, British India
- Died: 17 October 1987 (aged 63) Dhaka, Bangladesh
- Citizenship: British India ^{(till 1947)} Pakistan ^{(till 1971)} Bangladesh
- Party: Awami League
- Spouse: Late Sabura Khatun
- Children: 7
- Education: University of Dhaka

Abdul Malek Ukil (Bengali: আব্দুল মালেক উকিল; 1 October 1924 – 17 October 1987) was a Bangladeshi politician and lawyer. He served as president of Bangladesh Awami League, speaker of parliament, home minister, health minister, a member of parliament for many years and a lawyer of the Supreme Court of Bangladesh. He was one of the drafters of the Constitution of Bangladesh and also one of the founding members of East Bengal Muslim Students League.

== Early life ==
Abdul Malek Ukil was born in Rajapur village of Noakhali Sadar Upazila in Noakhali District. His educational life began at Noakhali Ahmadia High Madrasa, from where he passed his Madrasa Examination with general scholarship and a Letter in mathematics. In 1947, he passed his IA Examination from the Magura College in Jessore District. Two years later, in 1949, he graduated in BA from the University of Dhaka (Dhaka University). The following year, he received his MA degree and completed LL. B from the same institution. He started his professional career as an advocate at Noakhali District Bar in 1952. Subsequently, in 1962 he became a member of the Dhaka High Court Bar.

== Career ==
Malek Ukil was a founding member of East Bengal Muslim Student League. From 1964 to 1972 he was the president of Noakhali district Awami League and a member of the central executive committee of Awami League. In 1966 he presided over a conference of the opposition parties in Pakistan which was held in Lahore. He was elected three times to the East Pakistan Provincial Assembly in 1956, 1962 and 1965. He was the leader of both the Awami League parliamentary party and the combined opposition party in the Provincial Assembly of East Pakistan in 1965.

He was arrested during the Six-Point Movement. In the 1970 general election of Pakistan he was elected to the Pakistan National Assembly as the representative of Noakhali. After the start of Bangladesh Liberation War he joined the Relief and Rehabilitation Committee in the Mujibnagar Government. He went to Nepal as a part of a parliamentary delegation sent to generate support for Bangladesh's cause.

He was a member of the committee which drafted the Constitution of Bangladesh. In 1972 he was in charge of the Ministry of Health and Family Planning in the Sheikh Mujib cabinet. In 1973 he was again elected to the Jatiya Sangsad. He went on to become the minister in charge of home affairs in the cabinet after the election. In 1975 he was elected Speaker of the Jatiya Sangsad. He was next elected to the Jatiya Sangsad in 1986 and became the deputy leader of the opposition.

== Personal life ==
He was married to Sabura Khatun (1930–2019). They had two sons: Gulam Mohiuddin Latu and Baharuddin Khelon and five daughters: Fatema Begum (Ruby), Amena Begum (Baby), Nurun Nahar (Lily), Nurunnesa (Maya) and Lima Malek.

== Death ==
On 17 October 1987, he died in Dhaka Shaheed Suhrawardy Hospital at the age of 63.

== Controversy ==
After the assassination of Sheikh Mujibur Rahman on 15 August 1975, Abdul Malek Ukil, then speaker of parliament dominated by the Awami League, said in London in September 1975, "The Pharaoh has fallen. The country has been freed from the autocrat."
