= Chowmuhani =

City in Chattogram Division, Bangladesh

Chowmuhani চৌমুহনী
- Municipality
- Location within Chittagong division Location within Bangladesh
- Coordinates: 22°56′42″N 91°06′58″E
- Country: Bangladesh
- Division: Chittagong
- District: Noakhali
- Upazila: Begumganj

Government
  - Type: Mayor–Council
  - Body: Chowmuhani Municipality
  - Mayor: Khaled Saifullah

Area
  - Total: 36.0 km^{2} (13.9 sq mi)

Population (2022)
  - Total: 100,048
  - Density: 2,780/km^{2} (7,200/sq mi)
- Time zone: UTC+6 (Bangladesh Time)
- National Dialing Code: +880

Chowmuhani (Bengali: চৌমুহনী, romanized: Choumuhonī) is a city and municipal corporation in Noakhali District, located in Chattogram Division, Bangladesh. It is the administrative centre and capital of the Begumganj Upazila. Chowmuhani is an important businesses hub and trade centre in Noakhali District.

== Demographics ==
Religions in Chowmuhani city (2011)
Religion	Percent
Islam	88.17%
Hinduism	11.78%
Other or not stated	0.05%

According to the 2022 census, Chowmuhani city had a population of 100,048.

According to the 2011 Bangladesh census, Chowmuhani city had 14,568 households and a population of 80,001. 18,275 (22.84%) were under 10 years of age. Chowmuhani had a literacy rate (age 7 and over) of 67.23%, compared to the national average of 51.8%, and a sex ratio of 902 females per 1000 males.

== Education ==
- Chowmuhani Government S.A College, established in 1943
