= Sonapur College, Noakhali =

Coordinates: 22.8281°N 91.0995°E

Sonapur College is a college in the Sonapur neighborhood of Noakhali, Bangladesh. It was established in 1981. Late Principal Saleh Ahmed started the college with only 16 students. There are now more than 3,500 students, making it one of the biggest colleges in Noakhali District.
