= Chowmuhani Government Saleh Ahmed College =

- Chowmuhani College
- Type: Government College
- Established: 1943; 83 years ago
- Affiliations: Bangladesh National University, Board of Intermediate and Secondary Education, Comilla
- Principal: Professor Dr. Abu Sina Syed Tareq
- Location: Noakhali, Bangladesh
- Campus: 13, College Road, Narottampur, Chowmuhani, Noakhali
- Website: Official Website

Chowmuhani Government S.A. College is a government college established in 1943 in Begumganj Upazila of Noakhali District, Bangladesh. The college is affiliated with the National University, Bangladesh and the Comilla Education Board. It is the oldest college in the Noakhali district.

== History ==
During World War II in 1939, an initiative was taken to establish a college in Chowmuhani under the leadership of Khetranath Dalal. Later, Prasanna Kumar Roy Chowdhury and Harakumar Saha donated 30 decimals of land for the institution. Initially, the college was named "Chowmuhani College." Educational activities commenced in 1943, and the first principal to serve the college was Radhagobinda Nath, a retired principal of Comilla Victoria College.

When communal riots broke out in Noakhali in 1946 (Noakhali riots), many of the college's founders, including the principal, left the country. After the partition of the subcontinent, Mukunda Kishore Chakraborty took over as principal in 1947. Following him, Tofazzal Hossain was given the responsibility of acting principal. In 1950, he was officially appointed as the principal and served the college continuously for 31 years.

Although the college started with only 30 decimals of land, the total land area later expanded to 35 acres through purchase and acquisition. Formerly known simply as Chowmuhani College, it was renamed after the independence of Bangladesh in honor of its former student and heroic freedom fighter, martyr Saleh Ahmed. The college was nationalized on November 1, 1984, resulting in the new name Chowmuhani Government S.A. College. Currently, as per government directives, the college has been officially named Chowmuhani Government Saleh Ahmed College.

In the 2004–2005 academic year, honors courses were introduced at the college for the first time in eight subjects (Accounting, Political Science, Philosophy, Islamic Studies, Physics, Botany, Zoology, and Mathematics). Honors courses in Bengali were introduced in the 2006–2007 academic year, and in Chemistry and Management in the 2009–2010 academic year.

== Faculties and Departments ==
Currently, the college offers higher secondary education under the Comilla Board. Additionally, under the National University, Bangladesh, it provides undergraduate and postgraduate teaching and certification in Bengali, English, Economics, Physics, Political Science, Chemistry, Botany, Zoology, Mathematics, Islamic History and Culture, Philosophy, Islamic Studies, and Social Work.

=== Faculty of Arts and Social Sciences ===
This faculty consists of the following departments:

1. Department of Bengali
2. Department of Philosophy
3. Department of Islamic Studies
4. Department of Political Science
5. Department of Social Work
6. Department of Economics

=== Faculty of Science ===
This faculty consists of the following departments:

1. Department of Physics
2. Department of Chemistry
3. Department of Botany
4. Department of Zoology
5. Department of Mathematics

=== Faculty of Business Administration ===
This faculty consists of the following departments:

1. Department of Accounting
2. Department of Management

== Infrastructure ==
1. Mosque
2. Auditorium
3. Gymnasium
4. Playground

=== Others ===
1. BNCC (Army Wing)
2. Rover Scout
3. Red Crescent Society
4. Information Technology Club
5. Language Club

== Results ==
A list of the pass rates of students participating in public examinations at the college:

Year	Examination Name	Examinees	Passed	Pass Rate
2020	HSC	2059	2059	100%
2021	HSC	1865	1830	98.12%
2022	HSC	1644	1488	90.51%
2023	HSC	1808	1307	72.65%
2024	HSC	1952	1505	77.74%
2025	HSC	1900	1229	66.15%

== University Admission Success ==
Academic Year	Engineering Universities	Medical Colleges
2024-2025	3 Students	5 Students

== Notable Alumni ==
- Dr. Naiyyum Choudhury – Founding Chairman of the Bangladesh Atomic Energy Regulatory Authority.
- Mahmudur Rahman Belayet – Noakhali district leader of the Bangladesh Awami League, freedom fighter, and district head of the Mujib Bahini. He is a former Member of Parliament, elected first in 1973 and again in 1986 from the Noakhali-10 parliamentary seat (currently Noakhali-3 constituency), which comprises Begumganj Upazila. Former VP of Chowmuhani Government College.
- A. S. M. Abdur Rab – The first person to hoist the flag of independence, former VP of DUCSU, and former minister.
- Abdur Rab Chowdhury (1934–2018) – Lawyer of the Bangladesh Supreme Court, government official, politician from Lakshmipur district, and former Member of Parliament for the Lakshmipur-4 constituency.
- Sadhan Chandra Majumder – Former Minister of Food of the Government of Bangladesh.

== Organizations ==
=== Political ===
- Bangladesh Islami Chhatra Shibir
- Bangladesh Chhatra League
- Bangladesh Chhatra Odhikar Parishad
- Islami Shashontantra Chhatra Andolan
- Bangladesh Nationalist Student Dal

=== Cultural ===
- English Club
