= Noakhali Sadar Upazila =

Noakhali Sadar নোয়াখালী সদর
- Upazila
- Noakhali Sadar
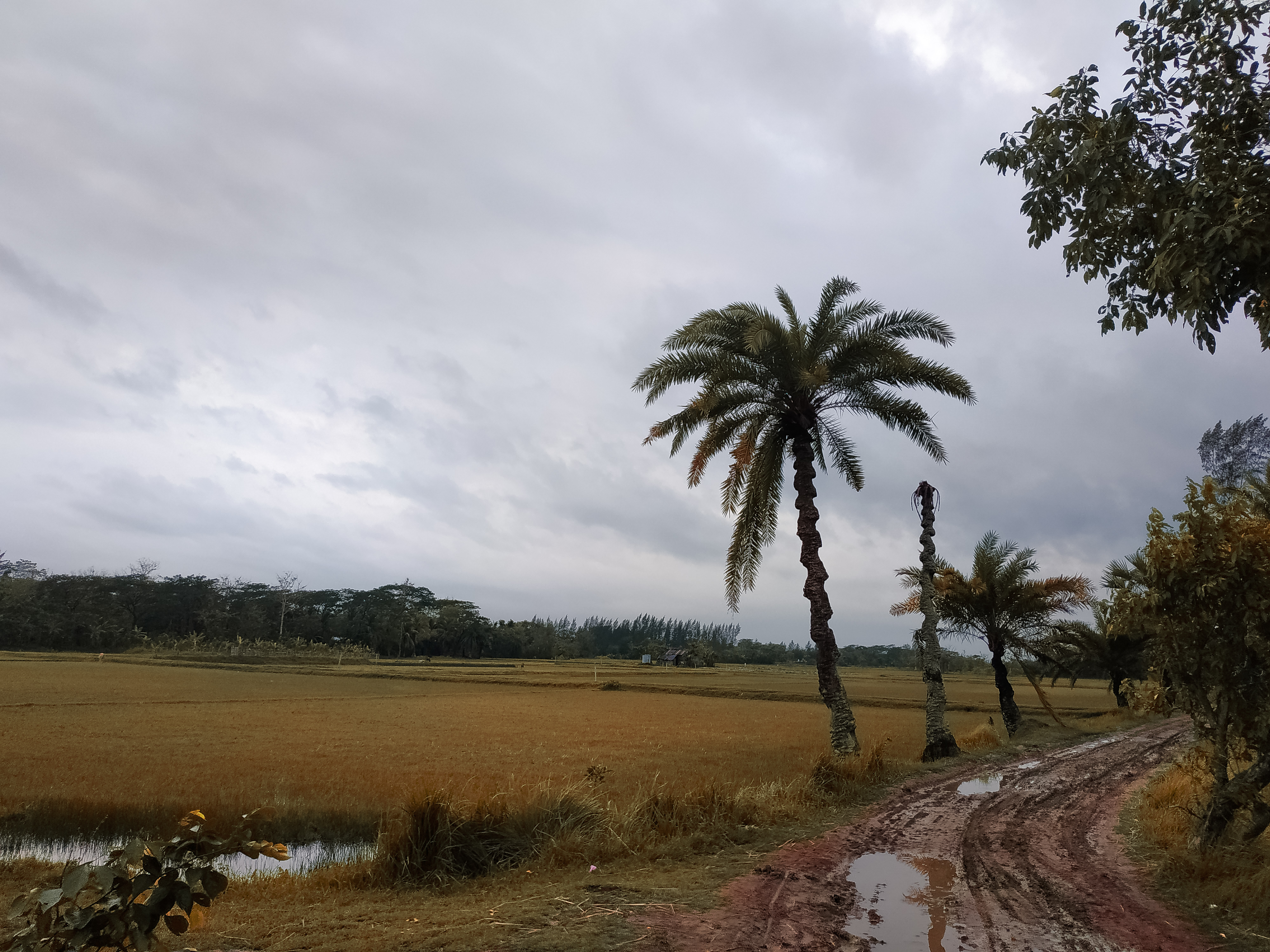
- Rural path with fields and palm trees in Noakhali Sadar Upazila

- Coordinates: 22°50′N 91°6′E
- Country: Bangladesh
- Division: Chittagong
- District: Noakhali

Area
  - Total: 336.06 km^{2} (129.75 sq mi)

Population (2022)
  - Total: 642,494
  - Density: 1,911.8/km^{2} (4,951.7/sq mi)
- Time zone: UTC+6 (BST)
- Postal code: 3800
- Area code: 0321
- Website: sadar.noakhali.gov.bd(in Bengali)

Noakhali Sadar Upazila mauza geocode map

Noakhali Sadar (Bengali: নোয়াখালি সদর) is an upazila of Noakhali District in Chattogram, Bangladesh.

== Geography ==
Noakhali Sadar Upazila has a total area of 336.06 square kilometres (129.75 sq mi). It borders Begumganj Upazila to the north, Kabirhat Upazila to the east, Suborno Char Upazila to the south, and Komolnagar and Lakshmipur Sadar upazilas of Lakshmipur District to the west. The Noakhali Canal flows north through the upazila.

== History ==
Noakhali Thana was established in 1861 and was converted into an upazila in 1984. It is the subdistrict where the district headquarters, Noakhali town, is located. The town is situated on the western bank of the Noakhali Canal, from which it takes its name. The Noakhali Canal was dug in 1660 to control flooding of Dakatia River. The name Noakhali means "New canal", derived from the Bengali words noa (new) and khal (canal).

== Demographics ==
Historical population
Year	Pop. (000)	±%
1981	483	—
1991	651	+34.8%
2001	767	+17.8%
2011	526	−31.4%
2022	642	+22.1%
2011 population declined because upazila boundaries were redrawn to create Suborno Char and Kabirhat upazilas Source: Bangladesh Bureau of Statistics

According to the 2022 Bangladeshi census, Noakhali Sadar Upazila had 137,912 households and a population of 642,494. 10.99% of the population were under 5 years of age. Noakhali Sadar had a literacy rate (age 7 and over) of 75.10%: 75.18% for males and 75.02% for females, and a sex ratio of 95.83 males for every 100 females. 160,042 (24.91%) lived in urban areas.

Noakhali Sadar had a literacy rate (age 7 and over) of 51.73%, compared to the national average of 51.8%, and a sex ratio of 1081 females per 1000 males. 130,842 (24.88%) lived in urban areas.

The boundaries of the upazila were redrawn in 2005 to create a new upazila, Subarnachar, and again in 2006 to create Kabirhat Upazila. The combined population of the three in 2011 was 1,012,392, a 32% increase from 2001.

=== Religions ===
Religions in Noakhali Sadar Upazila (2022)
Religion	Percent
Islam	97.14%
Hinduism	2.69%
Other or not stated	0.17%

== Sports ==
The most popular sports in the upazila are football and cricket. Shaheed Bulu Stadium is used for both, as well as for large community gatherings such as Victory Day celebrations.

== Administration ==
UNO: Akhinoor Jahan Nila.

Noakhali Sadar Upazila is divided into Noakhali Municipality and 13 union parishads: Anderchar, Ashwadia, Binodpur, Char Matua, Dadpur, Dharmapur, Ewazbalia, Kadir Hanif, Kaladaraf, Niazpur, Noakhali, Noannai, and Purba Char Matua. The union parishads are subdivided into 166 mauzas and 173 villages.

Noakhali Municipality was established in 1876. It is subdivided into 9 wards and 36 mahallas.

== Transport ==
Rail stations Maijdee, Maijdee Court, Harinarayanpur, and Noakhali are the last four on the branch line connecting Laksam and Noakhali. In May 2015, they were served by one intercity and four mail trains a day.

The town of Noakhali is the southern terminus of national highway N104, which connects to Feni, about 50 kilometres (31 mi) away.

== Education ==
Noakhali Science and Technology University, founded in 2006, is the only university. Noakhali Medical College, founded in 2008, is the only medical school.

There are ten colleges in the upazila: Bandher Hat A. M. College, Bhulua Degree College, Char Matua College, Maijdee Public College, Major (Rtd) Abdul Mannan College, National Model College, Noakhali Government College (est. 1963), Noakhali Government Women's College, Noakhali Model College, and Sonapur Degree College.

According to Banglapedia, Noakhali Zilla School, founded in 1853, Brother Andre High School (1857), Ahmadia Model High School (1906), Arun Chandra High School (1914), Noakhali Government Girls' High School (1934), and Paura Kalyan High School (1940) are notable secondary schools.

The madrasa education system includes two fazil and two kamil madrasas.

== Notable residents ==
- Muzaffar Ahmed, one of the founders of the Communist Party of India
- Zahurul Haq, whose arrest in the Agartala Conspiracy Case and 1969 death in custody led to mass protests
- Saadat Husain, former cabinet secretary and former chairman of Bangladesh Public Service Commission
- A B M Musa, Ekushey Padak recipient for journalism in 1999
- Abdul Malek Ukil, a drafter of the Constitution of Bangladesh, member of parliament and cabinet minister

== See also ==
- Upazilas of Bangladesh
- Districts of Bangladesh
- Divisions of Bangladesh
- Administrative geography of Bangladesh
