= Begumganj Upazila =

Begumganj বেগমগঞ্জ
- Upazila
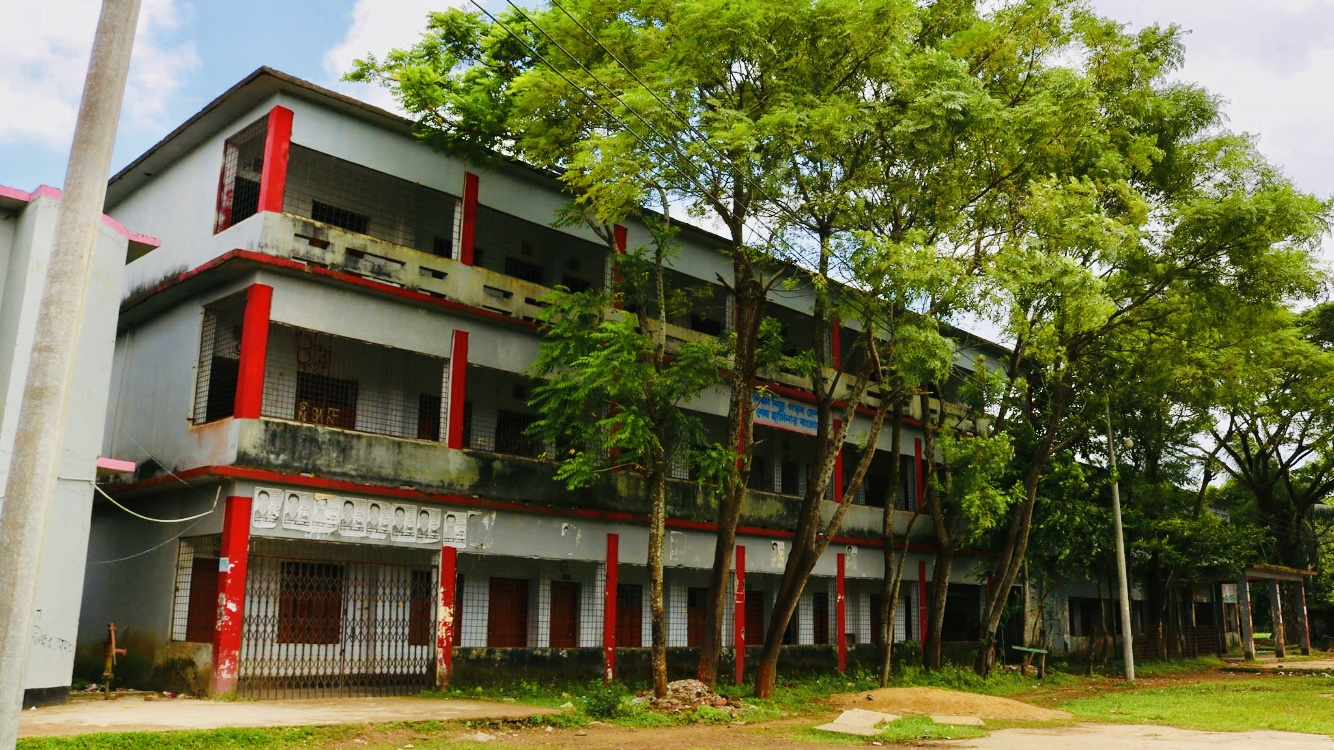
- Begumganj Govt. Pilot High School

- Coordinates: 22°57′N 91°6′E
- Country: Bangladesh
- Division: Chittagong
- District: Noakhali
- Headquarters: Chowmuhani

Area
  - Total: 238.37 km^{2} (92.04 sq mi)

Population (2022)
  - Total: 611,106
  - Density: 2,563.7/km^{2} (6,639.9/sq mi)
- Demonym: Begumganji
- Time zone: UTC+6 (BST)
- Postal code: 3820
- Area code: 03221
- Website: begumganj.noakhali.gov.bd

Begumganj Upazila mauza geocode map

Begumganj (Bengali: বেগমগঞ্জ, romanized: Begomgonj) is an upazila of the Noakhali District in Bangladesh's Chittagong Division. Begumganj Thana, now an upazila, was established in 1892.

== Geography ==
Begumganj is located at 22.9500°N 91.1000°E. It has 101,689 households and total area 238.37 km^{2}. It is considered to be a very poorly-drained area of the Old Meghna Estuarine Floodplain along with Laksam Upazila.

== History ==
During the Mughal period, a mosque was established in Chowdhury Bari, Gopalpur which still stands today. On 7 November 1946, Begumganj was visited by Mohandas Gandhi to suppress the Noakhali riots.

Begumganj suffered from tidal bore on 12 November 1970 as part of the 1970 Bhola cyclone. During the Bangladesh Liberation War of 1971, the Noakhali Company led by Subedar Lutfur Rahman was based in Begumganj. Bengali freedom fighters brawled with the Pakistan Army at Aminbazar Point on Chaumuhani-Lakshmipur road on 25 April. The freedom fighters launched an attack on a Razakar Camp located in Chandraganj High School on 2 July. On 19 August, 50 civilians were killed at Nayahat Bazar. Begumganj Thana was finally liberated on 6 August, and monuments were established in Chowmuhani and Sonaipur.

In 1982, Begumganj Thana was upgraded to upazila status as part of the President of Bangladesh Hussain Muhammad Ershad's decentralisation programme. The 1988, 1998 and 2004 floods caused a lot of damage to properties, crops and lives.

== Demographics ==
Religions in Begumganj Upazila (2022)
Religion	Percent
Islam	95.47%
Hinduism	4.51%
Other or not stated	0.02%

According to the 2022 Bangladeshi census, Begumganj Upazila had 131,517 households and a population of 611,106. 10.55% of the population were under 5 years of age. Begumganj had a literacy rate (age 7 and over) of 81.46%: 81.99% for males and 81.02% for females, and a sex ratio of 86.69 males for every 100 females. 103,579 (16.95%) lived in urban areas.

According to the 2011 Census of Bangladesh, Begumganj Upazila had 101,689 households and a population of 549,308. 137,673 (25.06%) were under 10 years of age. Begumganj had a literacy rate (age 7 and over) of 59.25%, compared to the national average of 51.8%, and a sex ratio of 1103 females per 1000 males. 132,948 (24.20%) lived in urban areas.

== Administration ==
Begumganj Upazila is divided into Chowmuhani Municipality and 16 union parishads: Gonipur, Alyearpur, Amanullapur, Begumganj, Chayani, Durgapur, Eklashpur, Gopalpur, Hajipur, Jirtali, Kadirpur, Kutubpur, Mirwarishpur, Narottampur, Rajganj, Rasulpur, and Sharifpur. The union parishads are subdivided into 178 mauzas and 184 villages. Chowmuhani Municipality is subdivided into 9 wards and 23 mahallas.

== Education ==
There are four colleges in Begumganj, including Chowmuhani Government S.A College. Among specialized colleges are Begumgonj Textile Engineering College, Noakhali and Abdul Malek Ukil Medical College, Noakhali.

According to Banglapedia, local secondary schools include Begumganj Government Pilot High School, Babupur Jirtoli Union High School (founded 1928), Ghatla High School (founded 1915), Hazipur Abdul Majid High School (founded 1928), Kadirpur High School (founded 1915), and Kalikapur Babupur Union High School (founded 1929). The madrasa education system includes eight fazil and one kamil madrasas.

== Notable people ==
- Aftab Ahmed, 5th vice-chancellor of the National University, Bangladesh
- Moeen U Ahmed, 12th Chief of Army Staff of the Bangladesh Army
- Barkat Ullah Bulu, former State Minister for Commerce
- Mufazzal Haider Chaudhury, essayist and linguist
- MA Hashem, founder of Partex Group
- Mamunur Rashid Kiron, director of Globe Pharmaceuticals
- Dhiraj Kumar Nath, diplomat
- Kazi Golam Rasul, judge known for his verdict in the Assassination of Sheikh Mujibur Rahman case
- Chittaranjan Saha, educationist
- Mahfuz Ullah, environmentalist

== See also ==
- Upazilas of Bangladesh
- Districts of Bangladesh
- Divisions of Bangladesh
