= List of formations of the Bangladesh Army =

Structure of the Bangladesh Army

Flag of the Bangladesh Army

The Bangladesh Army is commanded by the Chief of Army Staff who is a four star general and chief administrative officer at Army Headquarters. Under the command of army headquarters, Bangladesh Army has 1 training command, 1 logistics command and 10 area commands consigned with their coequal divisions. The training command is also the doctrine body of the army and is commanded by a general officer commanding with the rank of Lieutenant General. The area commands are adjured by area commanders, who are also general officer commanding of their respective divisions which precisely commanded by a major general. In addition, there are several independent brigades commanded by a brigade commander in the rank of brigadier general.

== Army Headquarters ==
Administrations

- Chief of General Staff's Branch
  - Directorate of Military Operations
  - Directorate General of Military Intelligence
  - Directorate of Military Training
  - Directorate of Staff Duties
  - Directorate of Budget
  - Directorate of Weapon, Equipment and Statistics
  - Directorate of Armoured
  - Directorate of Artillery
  - Directorate of Infantry
  - Directorate of Air Defence
  - Directorate of Signals
  - Directorate of Education
  - Directorate of Information Technology
  - Directorate of Overseas Operations
  - Directorate of Army Aviation
  - Judge Advocate General's Branch
  - Army Security Unit (ASU)
- Quartermaster General's Branch
  - Directorate of Movement and Quartering
  - Directorate of Works and Chief Engineer (Army)
  - Directorate of Supply and Transport
  - Directorate of Remount Veterinary and Farm
- Adjutant General's Branch
  - Directorate of Medical Services (Army)
  - Directorate of Welfare and Rehabilitation
  - Directorate of Pay, Pension and Allowances
  - Directorate of Personnel Administration
  - Directorate of Personnel Services
  - Directorate of Military Police and Provost Marshal
- Engineer-in-Chief's Branch
  - Directorate of Works
  - Directorate of Engineers
- Master General of Ordnance's Branch
  - Directorate of Ordnance
  - Directorate of Electrical and Mechanical Engineers
  - Directorate of Inspection and Technical Development
- Military Secretary's Branch

Affiliated organizations

- Bangladesh Army Welfare Trust
- Inter Services Public Relations Directorate (ISPR)
- Directorate General of Medical Service (DGMS)
- Armed Forces Institute of Pathology
- Bangladesh Diesel Plant
- Army Families Welfare Society

== Area Headquarters ==
Each Area headquarters are commended above the station headquarters. A Station commander of certain areas usually in the rank of brigadier general, may not be attached to the particular division the station command falls under.

Logistics Area

- Logistics Area Headquarters - at Dhaka Cantonment
  - Station Headquarters, Dhaka
  - Station Headquarters, Rajendrapur
  - Station Headquarters, Mirpur
  - 24th Engineers Construction Brigade, Dhaka
  - 34th Engineers Construction Brigade, Chittagong
  - Chief of Military Engineer Services, Dhaka

Savar Area

- Area Headquarters - at Savar Cantonment
  - Station Headquarters, Savar
  - 9th Infantry Division, Savar
    - 12th Bengal Lancers Regiment, Savar
    - 9th Artillery Brigade, Savar
    - 5th Bangladesh Infantry Regiment, Savar
    - 71st Mechanized Brigade, Savar
    - 81st Infantry Brigade, Savar
    - 99th Composite Brigade, Munshiganj
    - Field Intelligence Unit (FIU)
  - Chief of Military Engineer Services, Savar

Bogra Area

- Area Headquarters - at Bogra Cantonment
  - Station Headquarters, Bogra
  - Station Headquarters, Qadriabad
  - Station Headquarters, Rajshahi
  - 11th Infantry Division, Bogra
    - 93rd Armoured Brigade, Bogra
    - 11th Artillery Brigade, Jahangirabad
    - 59th East Bengal Regiment, Bogra
    - 26th Infantry Brigade, Bogra
    - 111th Infantry Brigade, Bogra
    - Field Intelligence Unit (FIU)
  - Chief of Military Engineer Services, Bogra

Chittagong Area

- Area Headquarters - at Chittagong Cantonment
  - Station Headquarters, Chittagong
  - Station Headquarters, Bandarban
  - Station Headquarters, Khagrachhari
  - Station Headquarters, Rangamati
  - Station Headquarters, Kaptai
  - 24th Infantry Division, Chittagong
    - 15th Divisional Armoured Squadron, Chittagong
    - 24th Artillery Brigade, Guimara
    - 18th Bangladesh Infantry Regiment, Chittagong
    - 69th Infantry Brigade, Bandarban
    - 203rd Infantry Brigade, Khagrachhari
    - 305th Infantry Brigade, Rangamati
    - Field Intelligence Unit (FIU)
  - Chief of Military Engineer Services, Chittagong

Jessore Area

- Area Headquarters - at Jessore Cantonment
  - Station Headquarters, Jessore
  - Station Headquarters, Jahanabad
  - 55th Infantry Division, Jessore
    - 9th Bengal Lancers Regiment, Jessore
    - 55th Artillery Brigade, Jessore
    - 19th East Bengal Regiment, Jessore
    - 21st Infantry Brigade, Jessore
    - 88th Infantry Brigade, Jessore
    - 105th Infantry Brigade, Jessore
    - Field Intelligence Unit (FIU)

Comilla Area

- Area Headquarters - at Comilla Cantonment
  - Station Headquarters, Comilla
  - 33rd Infantry Division, Comilla
    - 6th Bengal Cavalry Regiment, Comilla
    - 33rd Artillery Brigade, Comilla
    - 15th Bangladesh Infantry Regiment, Comilla
    - 44th Infantry Brigade, Comilla
    - 101st Infantry Brigade, Comilla
    - Field Intelligence Unit (FIU)

Rangpur Area

- Area Headquarters - at Rangpur Cantonment
  - Station Headquarters, Rangpur
  - Station Headquarters, Saidpur
  - Station Headquarters, Kholahati
  - 66th Infantry Division, Rangpur
    - 7th Horse Regiment, Rangpur
    - 66th Artillery Brigade, Kholahati
    - 25th Bangladesh Infantry Regiment, Rangpur
    - 72nd Infantry Brigade, Rangpur
    - 222nd Infantry Brigade, Saidpur
    - 16th Infantry Brigade, Kholahati
    - Field Intelligence Unit (FIU)

Ghatail Area

- Area Headquarters - at Shahid Salahuddin Cantonment
  - Station Headquarters, Ghatail
  - Station Headquarters, Mymensingh
  - 19th Infantry Division, Ghatail
    - 4th Horse Regiment, Ghatail
    - 19th Artillery Brigade, Ghatail
    - 29th East Bengal Regiment, Ghatail
    - 77th Infantry Brigade, Mymensingh
    - 309th Infantry Brigade, Ghatail
    - 98th Infantry Brigade, Bhuapur
    - Field Intelligence Unit (FIU)

Sylhet Area

- Area Headquarters - at Jalalabad Cantonment
  - Station Headquarters, Sylhet
  - Station Headquarters, Jalalabad
  - 17th Infantry Division, Jalalabad
    - 17th Artillery Brigade, Jalalabad
    - 11th Infantry Brigade, Sylhet
    - 52nd Infantry Brigade, Jalalabad
    - 360th Infantry Brigade, Jalalabad
    - Field Intelligence Unit (FIU)

Cox's Bazar Area

- Area Headquarters - at Ramu Cantonment
  - Station Headquarters, Ramu
  - Station Headquarters, Alikadam
  - 10th Infantry Division, Ramu
    - 16th Bengal Cavalry Regiment, Ramu
    - 10th Artillery Brigade, Ramu
    - 79th East Bengal Regiment, Ramu
    - 65th Infantry Brigade, Ramu
    - 2nd Infantry Brigade, Ramu
    - 97th Infantry Brigade, Alikadam
    - Field Intelligence Unit (FIU)

Barisal Area

- Area Headquarters - at Barisal Cantonment
  - Station Headquarters, Barisal
  - 7th Infantry Division, Barisal
    - 26th Horse Regiment, Barisal
    - 7th Artillery Brigade, Barisal
    - 35th Bangladesh Infantry Regiment, Barisal
    - 6th Infantry Brigade, Barisal
    - 28th Infantry Brigade, Barisal
    - 30th Infantry Brigade, Barisal
    - Field Intelligence Unit (FIU)

Army Training and Doctrine Command

- ARTDOC Headquarters - at Mymensingh Cantonment
  - 403rd Battle Group, Mymensingh

== Independent Installations ==
The following installations fall directly under Army headquarters command.

Regiments

- President Guard Regiment - Dhaka Cantonment
- Army Aviation Group - Tejgaon Airport

Brigades

- Para Commando Brigade - Jalalabad Cantonment
- 6th Independent Air Defence Brigade - Mirpur Cantonment
- 7th Independent Air Defence Brigade - Chittagong Cantonment
- 14th Independent Engineers Brigade - Dhaka Cantonment
- 86th Independent Signals Brigade - Dhaka Cantonment
- 46th Independent Infantry Brigade - Dhaka Cantonment
