= List of serving generals of the Bangladesh Army =

List of Bangladesh Army generals

Flag of the Bangladesh Army

This is a list of the serving generals and flag officers of the Bangladesh Army. Currently, the army has 1 general, 6 lieutenant generals and 56 serving major generals (including 5 from Army Medical Corps).

== Generals ==
Name	Post	Course	Corps	References
Waker-Uz-Zaman	Chief of Army Staff (also Colonel of the Regiment – East Bengal Regiment, Bangladesh Infantry Regiment and Colonel Commandant – Army Service Corps, Corps of Engineers)	13th BMA Long Course	Infantry	

== Lieutenant generals ==
Name	Post	Course	Corps	References
Mohammad Shaheenul Haque	Quartermaster General	20th BMA Long Course	Infantry	
S. M. Kamrul Hassan	Ambassador of Bangladesh to Portugal	21st BMA Long Course	Infantry	
Mohammad Faizur Rahman	Commandant, National Defence College (also Colonel Commandant – Corps of Military Police)	23rd BMA Long Course	Infantry	
Muhammad Mainur Rahman	Chief of General Staff	24th BMA Long Course	Infantry	
Mir Mushfiqur Rahman	Principal Staff Officer, Armed Forces Division	24th BMA Long Course	Infantry	
Mohammad Asadullah Minhazul Alam	Force Commander, UNFICYP	25th BMA Long Course	Infantry	
Vacant	General Officer Commanding, Army Training & Doctrine Command			

== Major generals ==
Name	Post	Course	Corps	References
Sayed Tareq Hussain	Ambassador of Bangladesh to Kuwait	21st BMA Long Course	Infantry	
Muhammad Mahbub-ul Alam	Vice Chancellor, Bangladesh University of Professionals	23rd BMA Long Course	Infantry	
Muhammad Maksudul Haque	Ambassador of Bangladesh to Iraq (also Colonel Commandant – Ordnance Corps)	24th BMA Long Course	Ordnance	
Naheed Asgar	Managing Director, Bangladesh Machine Tools Factory Limited	24th BMA Long Course	Army Service Corps	
Mahbubus Samad Chowdhury	Director General, Special Security Force	25th BMA Long Course	Infantry	
Muhammad Masudur Rahman	Senior Directing Staff - 1 (Army), National Defence College	25th BMA Long Course	Infantry	
Abu Bakar Siddique Khan	Master General of Ordnance (also Colonel Commandant – Air Defence Corps)	25th BMA Long Course	Air Defence Artillery	
Mohammad Habib Ullah	Ambassador of Bangladesh to Libya (also Colonel Commandant – Armoured Corps)	25th BMA Long Course	Armoured	
Muhammad Nasim Parvez	Ambassador, Ministry of Foreign Affairs (also Colonel Commandant – Corps of Signals)	25th BMA Long Course	Signals	
Syed Sabbir Ahmed	Commandant, Bangladesh Ordnance Factories	25th BMA Long Course	Ordnance	
Mohammed Hossain Al Morshed	Adjutant General	26th BMA Long Course	Infantry	
Towhidul Ahmed	Director General, Bangladesh Ansar and Village Defence Party	29th BMA Long Course	Infantry	
Khandaker Muhammad Shahidul Emran	Commandant, Bangladesh Military Academy	26th BMA Long Course	Infantry	
J. M. Emdadul Islam	Commandant, East Bengal Regimental Centre	26th BMA Long Course	Infantry	
Mohammad Jahangir Alam	Ambassador, Ministry of Foreign Affairs	26th BMA Long Course	Infantry	
Hasan Uz Zaman	Engineer in Chief	26th BMA Long Course	Engineers	
Mohammad Saadat Hossain	Director General, Directorate General of Defence Purchase	26th BMA Long Course	Infantry	
Hussain Muhammad Masihur Rahman	Director General, Bangladesh Institute of International and Strategic Studies	27rd BMA Long Course	Artillery	
Ferdous Hasan Salim	General Officer Commanding, 24th Infantry Division and Area Commander Chittagong Area	27th BMA Long Course	Infantry	
Raju Ahmed	Senior Directing Staff - 2 (Army), National Defence College	33th BMA Long Course	Infantry	
Abul Hasnat Mohammad Tariq	Military Secretary to Prime Minister	27th BMA Long Course	Infantry	
Abdul Motaleb Sazzad Mahmud	Commandant, Bangladesh Institute of Peace Support Operation Training	26th BMA Long Course	Infantry	
Mohammad Ashrafuzzaman Siddiqui	Director General, Border Guard Bangladesh (also Colonel Commandant - Regiment of Artillery)	27th BMA Long Course	Artillery	
Mohammad Moazzem Hossain	Executive Chairman, Bangladesh Export Processing Zones Authority	27th Long Course	Artillery	
Abu Mohammad Sarwar Farid	Director General, National Security Intelligence	27th BMA Long Course	Armoured	
Muhammad Hakimuzzaman	Commandant, Military Institute of Science and Technology	27th BMA Long Course	Engineers	
Mohammad Kamrul Hasan	Area Commander, Logistics Area	28th BMA Long Course	Infantry	
Mohammed Aftab Hossain	General Officer Commanding, 17th Infantry Division and Area Commander, Sylhet Area	28th BMA Long Course	Infantry	
Amanullah Saleh Muhammad Bahauddin	Military Secretary to the President	28th BMA Long Course	Artillery	
S. M. Asadul Haque	Commandant, Defence Services Command and Staff College (also Colonel Commandant – Remount, Veterinary and Farm Corps)	29th BMA Long Course	Infantry	
ABM Abdul Batin Imani	General Officer Commanding, 11th Infantry Division and Area Commander, Bogra Area	31th BMA Long Course	Infantry	
Mohammad Kaiser Rashid Chowdhury	Director General, Directorate General of Forces Intelligence	29th BMA Long Course	Artillery	
A. K. M. Arif	Group Commander, Army Aviation Group	29th BMA Long Course	Artillery	
Muhammad Sajjad Hossain	Chairman, Sena Kalyan Sangstha	29th BMA Long Course	Army Service Corps	
Muhammad Nazim Ud Daula	Commandant,Bangladesh Infantry Regimental Centre	30th BMA Long Course	Infantry	
Mohammad Khair Uddin	Military Secretary	30th BMA Long Course	Infantry	
Mahmudul Kabir	Commandant, School of Infantry and Tactics	30th BMA Long Course	Infantry	
Muhammad Mesbah Uddin Ahmed	Chairman, Bangladesh Tea Board	30th BMA Long Course	Infantry	
Mohammad Saiful Islam Bhuiyan	Chief Consultant General, Padma Multipurpose Bridge Project	30th BMA Long Course	Engineers	
Gulam Mahiuddin Ahmed	General Officer Commanding, 10th Infantry Division and Area Commander, Cox's Bazar Area	31st BMA Long Course	Infantry	
Mohammad Osman Sarwar	Director General, National Telecommunications Monitoring Centre	31st BMA Long Course	Engineers	
A. B. M. Faisal Baten	General Officer Commanding, 66th Infantry Division and Area Commander, Rangpur Area	31st BMA Long Course	Armoured	
Md Alimul Amin	Director General, Department of Immigration & Passports	31st BMA Long Course	Infantry	
Abu Hena Mohammad Razi Hasan	General Officer Commanding, 55th Infantry Division and Area Commander, Jessore Area	33rd BMA Long Course	Armoured	
Mozammel Hossain	General Officer Commanding, 19th Infantry Division and Area Commander, Ghatail Area	33rd BMA Long Course	Artillery	
Molla Mohammad Kamruzzaman	General Officer Commanding, 9th Infantry Division and Area Commander, Savar Area	32nd BMA Long Course	Infantry	
Md Mahbubul Haque	Chairman, Bangladesh Rural Electrification Board	32nd BMA Long Course	Electrical and Mechanical Engineers (EME)	
Md Sajedur Rahman	General Officer Commanding, 7th Infantry Division and Area Commander, Barisal Area	27th BMA Long Course	Infantry	
Mohamad Mohtashim Hyder Chowdhury	General Officer Commanding, 33rd Infantry Division and Area Commander Comilla Area	33rd BMA Long Course	Infantry	

== Army Medical Corps ==
Name	Post	Corps	References
Quazi Rashid-Un-Nabi	Director General, Directorate General of Medical Service	Army Medical Corps	
Md Salim-Ur-Rahman	Consultant Surgeon General, Directorate General of Medical Service	Army Medical Corps	
S. M. Mizanur Rahman	Consultant Physician General, Directorate General of Medical Service	Army Medical Corps	
Masudul Alam Mazumder	Commandant, Armed Forces Medical College	Army Medical Corps	
Dr. Nishat Jubaida	Commandant, Armed Forces Institute of Pathology	Army Medical Corps	

== See also ==
- List of serving admirals of the Bangladesh Navy
- List of serving marshals of the Bangladesh Air Force
