= Sena Paribar Kalyan Samity =

Non-profit organization in Bangladesh

- Abbreviation: SPKS
- Formation: 1975
- Founder: Rowshan Ershad
- Type: Nonprofit
- Headquarters: Dhaka, Bangladesh
- Region served: Bangladesh
- Official language: Bengali
- Parent organization: Bangladesh Army

Sena Paribar Kalyan Samity (Bengali: সেনা পরিবার কল্যাণ সমিতি) (soldiers family welfare society) is a Bangladeshi non-profit organisation by Bangladesh Army and managed by wives of senior military officers. The wife of the Bangladesh Army chief leads the organization.

== History ==
Sena Paribar Kalyan Samity was established in 1975 with Rowshan Ershad, wife of General Hussain Mohammad Ershad, as its founding president.

Sena Paribar Kalyan Samity established Sena Shahayok School in July 2007. It was led by Nazneen Moeen, wife of then chief of Army Staff Moeen U Ahmed. She distributed awards for students of Shaheed Bir Uttam Lt Anwar Girls College.

On 29 April 2015, Prime Minister Sheikh Hasina inaugurated the headquarters of Sena Paribar Kalyan Samity called Surjyakanya in Dhaka Cantonment.

The Cox's Khagrachari District unit of Sena Paribar Kalyan Samity in January 2019 distributed clothing among the poor in the area led by the local unit president Fahmida Sajed. She is the wife of Brigadier General A.K.M. Sajedul Islam of 24th Artillery Brigade based in Guimara Cantonment. The Rangamati District unit also distributed winter clothes.

The Cox's Bazar District unit of Sena Paribar Kalyan Samity distributed warm clothes for 400 people in Ramu Upazila. The Cox's Bazar District unit of Sena Paribar Kalyan Samity organized a free medical clinic for pregnant women in June 2020 and painting competition in September 2020 on the occasion of the 100th birthday of former President Sheikh Mujibur Rahman. The Cox's Bazar District Unit is attached to the 10th Infantry Division of Bangladesh Army out of Ramu Cantonment. The President of the unit, Sharmin Main, is the wife of the General Officer Commanding of the 10th Infantry Division, Major General Fakhrul Ahsan.

In August 2021, Sena Paribar Kalyan Samity and the Dhaka Cantonment Ladies Club distributed relief materials for poor people whose income was affected by the COVID-19 pandemic in Bangladesh in the residential area of Dhaka Cantonment. It was led by President Nurjahan Ahmed, wife of General SM Shafiuddin Ahmed, then chief of Army Staff of Bangladesh Army.

== See also ==
- Bangladesh Army Welfare Trust
- Sena Kalyan Sangstha
