= Guimara =

Guimara may refer to:

- Guimara Upazila, an upazila of Khagrachhari District, Chittagong Division, Bangladesh
  - Guimara Union, a union of Guimara Upazila under Khagrachhari District
- Guimara Cantonment, a Bangladeshi military cantonment located in Chattogram Division
