= 24th Artillery Brigade (Bangladesh) =

Brigade of the Bangladesh army

- ২৪ তম আর্টিলারি ব্রিগেড
- Active: 1982—present
- Country: Bangladesh
- Branch: Bangladesh Army
- Type: Artillery
- Garrison/HQ: Guimara Cantonment

24th Artillery Brigade (Note: Bengali: 24 তম আর্টিলারি ব্রিগেড, romanized: 24 Tama ārṭilāri brigēḍa) is an artillery brigade of the Bangladesh army. It is headquartered in Guimara Cantonment, Bangladesh. It is based in the Chattogram Hill Tracts and It is usually run by a Brigadier General. It is involved in welfare campaigns and joint operations in the Chattogram Hill Tracts. It is under the jurisdiction of the 24th Infantry Division of the Bangladesh Army.

== History ==
The Guimara Army Region and 24th Artillery Brigade has existed since 1982.

the 24th Artillery Brigade and Guimara Region which was established on 5 June 1982 was initially under the jurisdiction of Chittagong Cantonment and then it was shifted to be under the jurisdiction of Dighinala Region but in 1994, the brigade was finally shifted to be under the jurisdiction of Guimara Region.

In January 2016, the army unit was involved in distribution of blankets to help distressed people at Matiranga Zone HQ.

In May 2016, The then prime minister of Bangladesh, Sheikh Hasina announced that 4 army brigades will be retained including the 24th Artillery Brigade (Guimara Cantonment), 69th Infantry Brigade (Bandarban Cantonment), 203rd Infantry Brigade (Khagrachhari Cantonment), 305th Infantry Brigade (Rangamati Cantonment).

In September 2022, 24th Artillery Brigade and Guimara region army members gave humanitarian aid to 243 families in Guimara.

In February 2023, the brigade conducted a 8 hour long operation in the mountains against militants and arrested 5 individuals and captured sophisticated weapons including 4 mortars, 1 AK-47, 1 M-1, 1 LG long barrel, 1 22-mm rifle, 1 China pistol, 1 LG short-barrel, 2 walkie-talkies, mine-related equipment, 67 rounds of ammunition and Indian rupees. A Bangladesh police team was also sent to the area after receiving news from the army.

In June 2023, the unit was involved in release of 15,000 fish fries in Guimara and also involved in welfare campaigns in the region.

In March 2024, the army unit was involved in giving humanitarian aid and medical aid and treatment to families and gave help to hundreds of families in Guimara and also gave support to mosques and Hindu temples.

In April 2024, 24th Artillery Brigade gave goods and Eid gifts to 450 families in Guimara.

In October 2024, the then Commander of 24th Artillery Brigade and Guimara Army Region Brigadier General Raisul Islam inaugurated a passenger shelter establishment and tree planting also occurred near Shaheed Lieutenant Mushfiqur High School.

In December 2024, the army unit's members was involved in humanitarian assistance in the Chattogram Hill Tracts and helped 526 people medically by providing care and medicines.

In January 2025, A joint operation by the local police and 24th Artillery Brigade in CHT arrested 2 miscreants and captured a pistol, 2 illegally held phones and other items.

== See also ==
- List of formations of the Bangladesh Army
- 403 Battle Group (Bangladesh)
