= Saidpur Cantonment =

Bangladeshi military cantonment

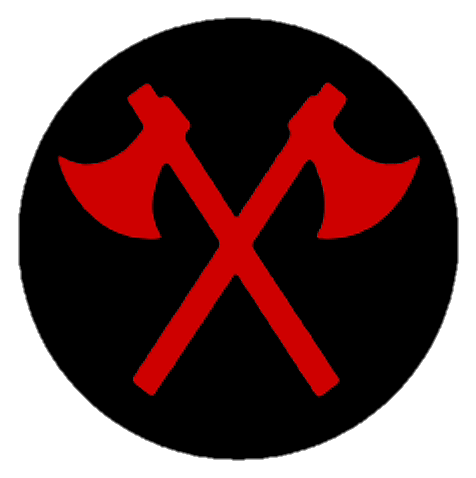
Saidpur Cantonment
- Saidpur, Rangpur, Bangladesh

Site information
- Type: Cantonment
- Controlled by: Bangladesh Army

Location
- Coordinates: 25.7631°N 88.9175°E

Saidpur Cantonment is a cantonment of the Bangladesh Armylocated in Saidpur, Nilphamari District, Bangladesh. It functions under the area command of Rangpur Area.

== Installation ==
- EME Centre and School (EMEC&S)

Commands under 66th Infantry Division

- 222nd Infantry Brigade
- Station Headquarters, Saidpur
  - Static Signal Company
  - Combined Military Hospital (CMH), Saidpur
  - Station ST Company
  - OSP-2

== Education ==
- Bangladesh Army University of Science and Technology
- Saidpur Cantonment Public School & College
- Saidpur Cantonment Board High School

== See also ==
- List of formations of the Bangladesh Army
- Mawa Cantonment
- Postogola Cantonment
- Qadirabad Cantonment
- Kholahati Cantonment
- Guimara Cantonment
