= Alikadam =

Alikadam may refer to:

- Alikadam Cantonment, a cantonment located outside of Bandarban District
- Alikadam Upazila, an upazila of Bandarban District
- Alikadam Sadar Union, a union of Alikadam Upazila.
