= Kaptai Cantonment =

Cantonment of the Bangladesh Army

- Kaptai, Chittagong, Bangladesh

Site information
- Type: Cantonment
- Controlled by: Bangladesh Army

Kaptai Cantonment is a cantonment located at Kaptai in Rangamati district. A navy base is also located in Kaptai.

== See also ==
- Bandarban Cantonment
- Khagrachhari Cantonment
- Rangamati Cantonment
- Guimara Cantonment
