= Hussain Muhammad Masihur Rahman =

Major General of the Bangladesh Army

Masihur Rahman
- Born: Bhola, Khulna Division, Bangladesh
- Military career
- Allegiance: Bangladesh
- Branch: Bangladesh Army
- Service years: 1992 -present
- Rank: Major General
- Unit: East Bengal Regiment
- Commands: Commandant of BIPSOT; GOC of 19th Infantry Division; Commander of 77th Infantry Brigade
- Conflicts: UNAMSIL; UNOCI; MINUSMA
- Awards: Sena Gourab Padak (SGP); Sena Parodorshita Padak (SPP)

Hussain Muhammad Masihur Rahman (Note: Bengali: হুসাইন মুহাম্মাদ মাসীহুর রাহমান) (Note: SGP, SPP, afwc, ndc, psc) is a two star officer of the Bangladesh Army and incumbent commandant of Bangladesh Institute of Peace Support Operation Training. He is the former general officer commanding of 19th Infantry Division and area commander, Ghatail area.

== Early life and education ==
Rahman was born in Bhola then part of Khulna Division of Bangladesh. He is a Hafiz and finished matriculation examination under the Bangladesh Madrasah Education Board. Rahman enlisted to Bangladesh Military Academy in 1990 and commissioned in East Bengal Regiment with the 27th BMA long course in 1992. He graduated from Defence Services Command and Staff College in 2009 and the Armed Forces War College in 2011. Rahman furthermore completed his National Defence College in 2020.

== Military career ==
Rahman commanded two infantry companies at Ghatail and Rangamati and one infantry battalion in Momenshahi. Rahman furthermore served as brigade major of two infantry brigades, as deputy adjutant quartermaster general of 19th Infantry Division at Ghatail and general staff officer (grade-1) at ARTDOC. Rahman was ameliorated to colonel on 2015 and served as colonel staff of operations and planning Directorate of the Armed Forces Division. He was promoted to brigadier general on 2019 and was designated as commander of 77th Infantry brigade at Momenshahi Cantonment. Rahman also served as one of the directors at the Armed Forces War College. Rahman returned to Armed Forces Division in 2022 as the director general of operations and planning directorate. Rahman co-hosted the disaster response exercise with the U.S. Army Pacific on 2023. He was upgraded to major general on 2024 and posted as general officer commanding of 19th infantry division and area commander Ghatail area. As of 2025 Rahman is serving as commandant of Bangladesh Institute of Peace Support Operation Training.

=== United Nations peacekeeping missions ===
Rahman served in United Nations peacekeeping missions thrice. First, under UNSC in Sierra Leone, he served in UNAMSIL from 2000 to 2001. Then again as a commanding officer of BANBAT-12 in UNOCI in the Ivory Coast from 2014 to 2015 and received citations by SRSG for outstanding performance. He again served as Contingent Commander at MINUSMA in Mali from 2018 to 2019.
