= Muhammad Moin Khan =

Bangladeshi military officer

Moin Khan
- মঈন খান
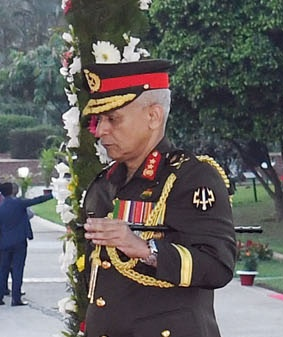
- Moin Khan in 2024
- Born: 11 December 1969 (age 56)
- Alma mater: Bangladesh Military Academy
- Military career
- Allegiance: Bangladesh
- Branch: Bangladesh Army
- Service years: 1990–2025
- Rank: Major General
- Unit: East Bengal Regiment
- Commands: GOC of 9th Infantry Division; Commander of Logistics Area; Commander of 97th Infantry Brigade; Commander of 77th Infantry Brigade
- Conflicts: UNIKOM

Moin Khan is a retired major general of the Bangladesh Army who served as the general officer commanding of the 9th Infantry Division and area commander of Savar Area. Previously, he was commander of the logistics area. He was also the former director of inspection and technical development at army headquarters as a brigadier general.

== Career ==
Moin was commissioned into the Bangladesh Army on 22 June 1990 with the 22nd BMA Long Course.

Moin served as area commander of the logistics area at Dhaka Cantonment. Earlier, he was minister (consular) at the Bangladesh High Commission, London, UK, and director (border) of the National Security Intelligence.

He is the former colonel-commandant of the Remount Veterinary and Farm Corps.
