= Sayed Tareq Hussain =

Major General of Bangladesh Army

Syed Tareq Hussain OSP
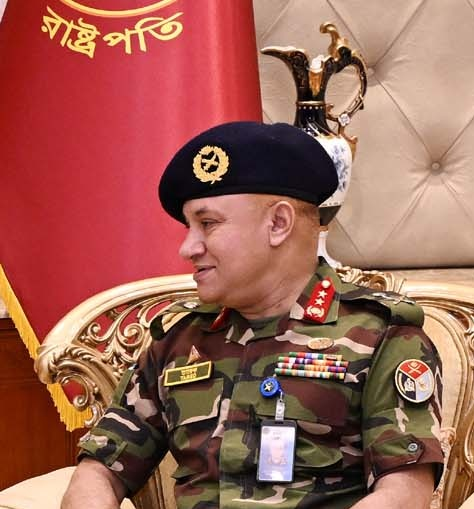
- Tareq in 2024
- Born: 1969 (age 56–57)
- Alma mater: Bangladesh Military Academy
- Military career
- Allegiance: Bangladesh
- Branch: Bangladesh Army
- Service years: 1989 – present
- Rank: Major General
- Unit: East Bengal Regiment
- Commands: Senior Directing Staff (SDS Army-1) of National Defence College; Commandant of Bangladesh Ordnance Factories; GOC of 19th Infantry Division; Commander of 81st Infantry Brigade; Commander of 72nd Infantry Brigade
- Awards: Oshamanno Sheba Padak (OSP)

Syed Tareq Hussain OSP, awc, psc is a major general of Bangladesh Army and currently serving as the ambassador of Bangladesh to Kuwait. Earlier, he was senior directing staff (army) at National Defence College. Prior to that, he was commandant of Bangladesh Ordnance Factory.

== Career ==
Hussain served in the Bangladesh Army headquarters in charge of Inspection, Research & Technical Development Directorate with the rank of brigadier general in 2020. In December 2020, he was promoted to major general and appointed general officer commanding of the 19th Infantry Division based in Shahid Salahuddin Cantonment. He was a member of the Central Committee of Proyash.

On 27 March 2021, Hussain hosted Indian veterans of the Bangladesh Liberation war at Shahid Salahuddin Cantonment in Ghatail. He was the chief patron of Ghatail Cantonment English School. In May 2024, he appointed as ambassador of Bangladesh to Kuwait.

== Personal life ==
In personal life, he is happily married to Bilkis Begum Simi and the couple is blessed with two daughters. His hobby includes reading books, listening to music and playing golf.
