= Mohammad Humayun Kabir =

Bangladeshi military officer

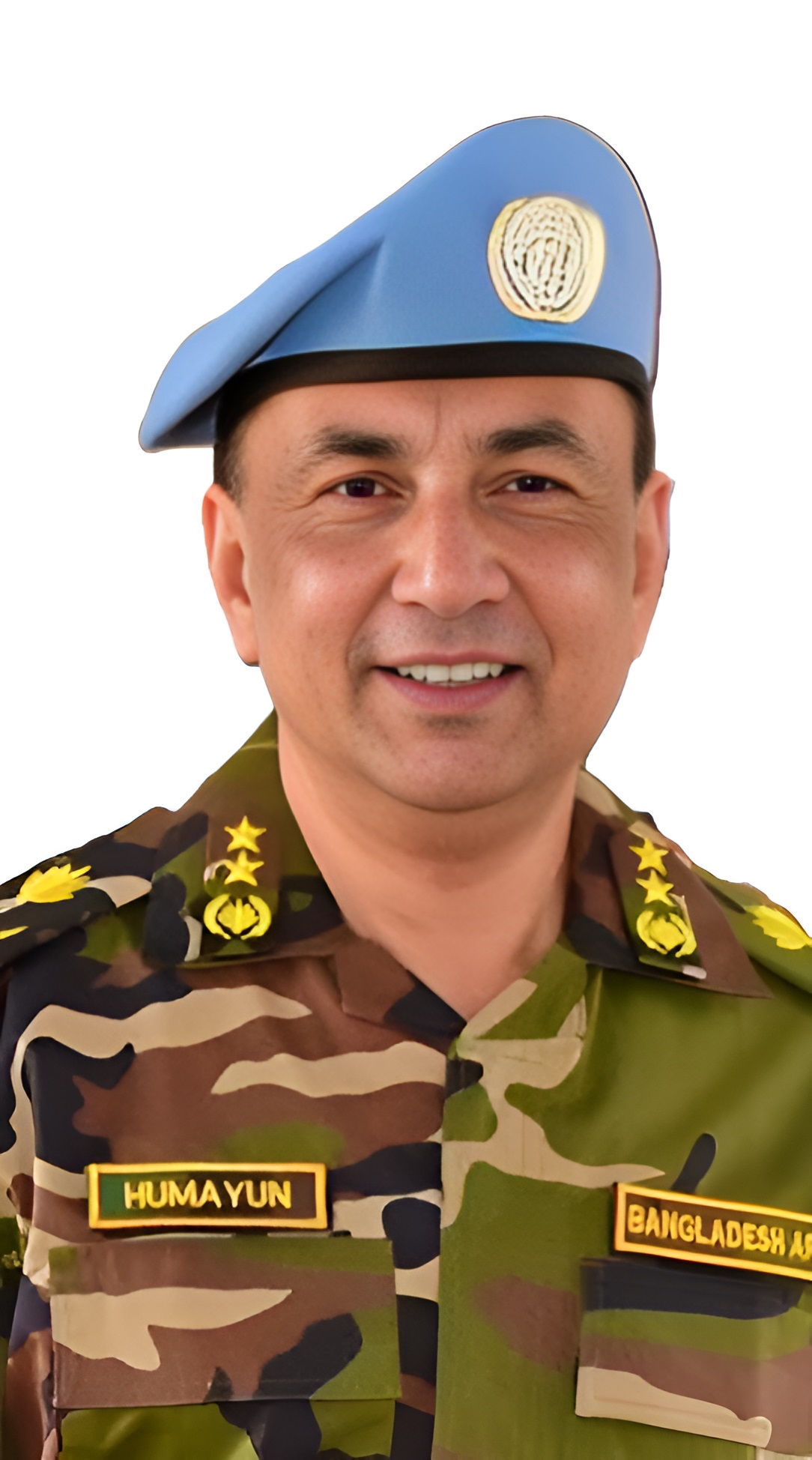
- Born: 11 October 1965 (age 61); Mirzapur, East Pakistan, Pakistan
- Military career
- Allegiance: Bangladesh
- Branch: Bangladesh Army
- Service years: 1985–2021
- Rank: Major General
- Unit: East Bengal Regiment
- Commands: Commander of 99th Composite Brigade; Commander of 81st Infantry Brigade; GOC of 17th Infantry Division; Commandant of Bangladesh Military Academy; GOC of 55th Infantry Division; Commander of Logistics Area; AG of Army Headquarters
- Conflicts: UNFICYP; MONUSCO; UNPROFOR
- Awards: Sena Utkorsho Padak(SUP); Oshamanno Sheba Padak(OSP)

Mohammad Humayun Kabir OSP, SUP, rcds, psc is a former two-star officer of the Bangladesh Army. Humayun served as the commander Logistics Area Dhaka Cantonment of Bangladesh Army. He served in various command and headquarters formations. He served as adjutant general of Bangladesh Army, commandant of the Bangladesh Military Academy, the director of military operations-Army headquarters and also the general officer commanding (GOC) of the 55th Infantry Division and the 17th Infantry Division.

== Education ==
He holds three master's degrees, in international security and strategy from King's College London (2013); in business administration from the University of Dhaka (2002-2005); and in defence studies from Bangladesh National University (1998-1999). He is also a graduate of the Royal College of Defence Studies in the United Kingdom (2012-2013), and the United States Army Command and General Staff College (1999-2000).

== Military career ==
Humayan Kabir was commissioned as an officer in the 13th BMA Long Course in December 1985. He held staff positions in the field and at headquarters. As a brigadier general, he commanded an infantry brigade and later went onto serve as director of Military Operations Directorate for the Bangladesh Army. He has served as commandant of the Bangladesh Military Academy. After promotion to the rank of major general he commanded the 17 infantry division (Sylhet) from 2013 to 2016.

=== UN missions ===
Kabir served as a military observer with the United Nations Organization Mission in the Democratic Republic of the Congo (MONUC) from 2002 to 2003, and with the United Nations Protection Force (UNPROFOR) from 1995 to 1996.

On 26 July 2016 UN Secretary-General Ban Ki-moon appointed Major General Mohammad Humayun Kabir as force commander of the United Nations Peacekeeping Force in Cyprus (UNFICYP). He succeeded Major General Kristin Lund, the first female force commander in the UN.

== Personal life ==
Mohammad Humayun Kabir was born in 1965. He is married and has three sons. He is married to Tazrin Sultana.
