= Abu Bakr Siddique Khan =

Bangladeshi military personnel

Abu Bakar Siddique Khan
- Born: Munshiganj, Dacca Division, Bangladesh
- Education: Bangladesh Military Academy
- Military career
- Allegiance: Bangladesh
- Branch: Bangladesh Army
- Service years: 1991 - present
- Rank: Major General
- Unit: Regiment of Artillery
- Commands: MGO at Army Headquarters; Director General of Bangladesh Institute of International and Strategic Studies; Commander of 6th Independent Air Defence Artillery Brigade

Abu Bakar Siddique Khan (Bengali: আবু বকর সিদ্দিক খাঁন) is a two-star officer and the incumbent master general of the ordnance of the Bangladesh Army. He is the former director general of the Bangladesh Institute of International and Strategic Studies. Khan is also the pioneer colonel commandant of the Air Defence Corps.

== Early life and education ==
Khan was born in Munshiganj, Bangladesh. After finishing high school, he enlisted in the Bangladesh Military Academy in 1989 and was commissioned with the 25th BMA long course in the regiment of artillery in December 1991. Khan is a graduate of the Defence Services Command and Staff College, the National Defence College, and the Armed Forces War College. Khan also obtained his gunnery staff course on air defence from the Pakistan Army School of Artillery at Nowshera, Pakistan.

== Military career ==
Khan instructed at the Artillery Centre and School and the Defence Services Command and Staff College. He commanded one air defence regiment, one air defence battery and was the general staff officer (grade-1) of the 66th Infantry Division at Rangpur Cantonment. Khan was also the deputy director of artillery directorate in army headquarters. He was promoted to brigadier general in 2017 and commanded the independent air defence artillery brigade at Mirpur Cantonment. Khan furthermore served as one of the directors of the Armed Forces War College. He was promoted to major general in April 2024 and appointed as director general of the Bangladesh Institute of International and Strategic Studies. He returned to army headquarters in September 2024 and was designated as the master general of ordnance. On 28 October 2025, Khan was made the first colonel commandant of the air defence corps.
