= Sabbir Ahmed =

Bangladeshi military personnel

- Military career
- Allegiance: Bangladesh
- Branch: Bangladesh Army
- Service years: 1982–2017
- Rank: Lieutenant General
- Unit: East Bengal Regiment
- Commands: Chief of General Staff of Army Headquarters; GOC of ARTDOC; GOC of 24th Infantry Division; GOC of 66th Infantry Division; Commander of 46th Independent Infantry Brigade; Commander of 98th Composite Brigade
- Conflicts: UNOMIG; UNOSOM I
- Awards: Senabahini Padak (SBP); Sena Gourab Padak(SGP); Oshamanno Sheba Padak(OSP)

Sabbir Ahmed, SBP, OSP, SGP, ndc, psc, is a retired lieutenant general of the Bangladesh Army who served as chief of general staff in the Army Headquarters. He also served as general-officer-commanding (GOC) of the Army Training and Doctrine Command. He was previously GOC of the 24th Infantry Division in Chittagong, GOC of 66th Infantry Division, and director of military training (DMT) of Army Headquarters Military Training Directorate.
