= Kristin Lund =

Kristin Lund may refer to:

- Kristin Lund (general) (born 1958), general in the Norwegian Army
- Kristin Skogen Lund (born 1966), director general of the Confederation of Norwegian Enterprise
