= Mongla Cement Factory =

Factory in Bangladesh

- Location: Bagerhat, Khulna, Bangladesh
- Owner: Sena Kalyan Sangstha

Mongla Cement Factory (Bengali: মংলা সিমেন্ট ফ্যাক্টিরি, lit. 'Mongla Cement Factory') is a cement factory located in Bagerhat, Khulna, Bangladesh. It is operated by Sena Kalyan Sangstha.

In total, there are about 212 workers in the factory.

== History ==
In 1994, Mongla Cement Factory was established.

In 1997, then Chief of Army Staff, Lieutenant General Muhammad Mahbubur Rahman inaugurated Mongla Cement Factory.

In 2002, a second mill was established.

In 2015, the cement factory partially collapsed leading to 8 deaths and 70 injuries.
