= Lakers' Public School and College =

Lakers' Public School and College লেকার্স পাবলিক স্কুল ও কলেজ

Location
- Kathaltoli; Bangladesh
- Coordinates: 22.6539°N 92.1809°E

Information
- Type: Private
- Motto: শিক্ষা সম্প্রীতি প্রগতি
- Established: 1991
- School district: Board of Intermediate and Secondary Education, Chittagong
- Principal: Major Mohsin Kabir
- Staff: 24
- Faculty: 61
- Grades: 1 to 12
- Enrollment: 1600+
- Campus type: Urban
- Website: lakers.edu.bd

Lakers' Public School and College is a private higher secondary school located in Kathaltoli, Rangamati, Bangladesh. It is managed by the Bangladesh Army, Rangamati Cantonment. The school was established in 1991.

== History ==
Lakers' Public School was established on 23 February 1991 by the Bangladesh Army's 305 Infantry Brigade stationed at Rangamati Cantonment.

LPS started its functions in hired accommodation at Kalindipur with 60 students and 7 teachers. The local government council in Rangamati allotted 1.3 acres (5,300 m^{2}) of khash land at Kathaltali on which the ground floor of the present school building was constructed and started with 7 classes from nursery to Std V from 1 September 1995.

The Chittagong Hill Tracts Development Board funded the construction of two four-storey buildings at a cost of 44.4 million Bangladeshi taka ($524,000 as of 2020). The new academic and science building was inaugurated on 19 November 2020.

== See also ==
- List of schools in Bangladesh
