= Muhammad Sajjad Hossain =

Two-star Bangladesh Army general

- Born: 22 November 1972 (age 53); Rangamati District, Bangladesh
- Children: 1
- Military career
- Allegiance: Bangladesh
- Branch: Bangladesh Army
- Service years: 1993-present
- Rank: Major General SUP, ndc, afwc, psc
- Unit: Army Service Corps
- Commands: Chairman of Sena Kalyan Sangstha
- Conflicts: UNMIS; UNMIL; UNOCI

Muhammad Sajjad Hossain, SUP, ndc, afwc, psc is a two-star general of the Bangladesh Army. He is currently serving as the chairman of the Sena Kalyan Sangstha. Prior to his promotion, he was serving as a director of Trust Bank.

== Career ==
Hossain was commissioned on December 16, 1993, from the 29th BMA Long Course into the Army Service Corps.

He has commanded Army Supply and Transport Battalion and provided supplies, logistics, and services support to the entire armed forces. In addition to his military duties, he has been associated with several military-linked corporate institutions, including serving as a nominated director of Trust Bank PLC and Astha Life Insurance Company Ltd.

In September 2025, he was promoted to major general and was made chairman of SKS.

=== UN Peacekeeping contribution ===
Hossain has served in three different UN peacekeeping missions. He served as pioneer staff officer of UNOCI during the rapid deployment and mission start-up phase. He also served as senior staff officer of UNMIS and as section chief of UNMIL.
