= Jamuna Cantonment =

Bangladeshi military cantonment

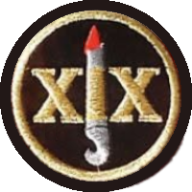
Jamuna Cantonment
- যমুনা সেনানিবাস
- Bhuapur, Dhaka, Bangladesh

Site information
- Type: Cantonment
- Controlled by: Bangladesh Army

Location
- Coordinates: 24.4028°N 89.8025°E

Garrison information
- Current commander: Brig Gen S M Asadul Haque, psc

Jamuna Cantonment (Bengali: যমুনা সেনানিবাস) is a Bangladeshi military cantonment near Jamuna Bridge in Bhuapur upazila, Tangail district, Bangladesh. The cantonment has been named in line with the name of Jamuna Bridge. It has been established to ensure overall security of the bridge as it is the main link of the highway connectivity between North Bengal and eastern areas of Bangladesh.

== Installations ==
Commands under 19th Infantry Division

- 98th Composite Brigade

== See also ==
- Jamuna River
- Padma Cantonment
