= Bangladesh Army Welfare Trust =

Trust Owned by the Bangladesh Army

- Formation: June 1998
- Type: Autonomous body
- Legal status: Welfare Trust
- Headquarters: Dhaka, Bangladesh
- Official language: Bengali
- Parent organization: Bangladesh Army

Bangladesh Army Welfare Trust is a trust owned and operated by the Bangladesh Army. It owns a number of businesses including hotels, gas stations, and golf clubs. In 2021, The Economist placed the value of the trust holdings at US$700 million.

== History ==
The Bangladesh Army Welfare Trust was established in June 1998. In 1999, the trust established Trust Bank Limited. The BBC estimated the commercial enterprise of the Bangladesh Army to be over 30 billion taka. The trust was founded to look after the interests and welfare of retired military personnel. The organizations under the trust include hotels, golf clubs, filling stations, Trust Bank Limited and shopping complexes. In 2009, the trust provided 40 percent of the funding for Dhaka Metro Rail.

The trust started a bus service in 2014. The trust owns the Radisson Hotel in Dhaka and Chittagong. The land for the hotel was leased to the trust by the Bangladesh Army for a relatively low price. The hotels are owned by Sena Hotel Developments Limited which is a subsidiary of the trust and Sena Kalyan Sangstha.

The BBC did a 9-part documentary called Probaho that examined military commercial ventures including those of the trust. Mongla Cement is owned by the trust. The involvement of the trust and the Bangladesh Army in business has faced criticism. The director of the trust is a director of Bangladesh Army University of Engineering & Technology.

In December 2020, Bangladesh Army Welfare Trust signed a billion dollar agreement with Singapore-based Raffles Infrastructure Holdings and Cupertino Power Limited, based in Bangladesh, to develop a residential area in Baunia called Trust Green City. It will be near Mirpur DOHS and Uttara Thana. Astha Life Insurance Company Limited was launched in 2020. It signed an agreement with Sikder Group to build a luxury resort in Bandarban which will destroy six villages of the Mro tribe and violate local laws.

Bangladesh Army Welfare Trust signed an agreement with Eleris Energy Limited, a United States-based company, to build a solar energy power plant in February 2022. Brigadier General Abul Mansur Md Ashraf Khan, managing director of Bangladesh Army Welfare Trust, signed the agreement on behalf of the trust.

== Businesses ==
- Trust Innovation Limited
- Jol Torongo-Laboni Beach
- Mongla Cement Factory
- Trust Bank Limited
- Astha Life Insurance Company Limited
- Trust Green City
- Trust Overseas Recruiting Agency
- Radisson Blu Dhaka Water Garden
- Radisson Blu Hotel, Chittagong
- Army Shopping Complex
- Sena Hotel Development Limited
- Sena Filling Station
- Trust Filling and CNG Station
- Sena Kunjo
- Sena Maloncho
- Trust Transport Services
- Jolshiri Abashon
- Trust Securities
- Bay Watch
- Kurmitola Golf Club
- Savar Golf Club
- Taxi service with Toma Paribahan
- Projonmo Student Hostel

== See also ==
- Sena Kalyan Sangstha
- Retired Armed Forces Officer's Welfare Association
- Sena Paribar Kalyan Samity
