= Murder of Major Sinha Mohammed Rashed Khan =

Bangladeshi murder case

- Date: 31 July 2020; 5 years ago
- Time: 9:25 PM
- Location: Cox's Bazar–Teknaf Marine Drive, Baharchara Union, Teknaf, Cox's Bazar
- Type: Murder, proxy murder
- Deaths: 1 (Major Sinha Mohammed Rashed Khan)
- Verdict: Guilty
- Convictions: Inspector Liakat Ali: Murder; OC Pradeep Kumar Das: Murder; Sub-inspector Nanda Dulal Rakshit, Sagar Dev, Rubel Sharma, Nezam Uddin, Nurul Amin, Ayaz Uddin: Arranging assassination
- Sentence: Death sentence: OC Pradeep Kumar Das; Inspector Liakat Ali; Life imprisonment: Sub-inspector Nanda Dulal Rakshit; Sagar Dev; Rubel Sharma; Nezam Uddin; Nurul Amin; Ayaz Uddin

The Murder of Major Sinha Mohammed Rashed Khan refers to the extrajudicial killing of a retired Bangladesh Army Major in Cox's Bazar by members of Bangladesh Police on 31 July 2020.

== Background ==
Khan had served in Bangladesh Army and on deputation in the Special Security Forces. He voluntarily retired from the army in 2018.

Khan had travelled to Cox's Bazar to make a documentary and was staying at Neelima Resort. He was accompanied by Shahedul Islam Sifat, Shipra Debnath, and Tahsin Rifat Nur; all of whom are film and media students at Stamford University Bangladesh. He was driving with an associate, Shehedul Islam Shifat, on Marine Drive road on 31 July 2020 when they were stopped at Shamlapur Police Check post by Inspector Liaqat Ali at around 9 pm. He was shot eight times by Inspector Ali. He was bought to Cox's Bazar Sadar Hospital where he was declared dead. According to the police, they shot Khan after he pointed a gun at them, however according to the witness present, Khan had raised his hands in the air when he was shot. Inspector Pradeep called Superintendent of Police ABM Masud Hossain and informed him an army major had been killed in an "encounter.” The recording of the conversation was leaked on social media.

After Khan's death, Shahedul Islam Sifat and Shipra Debnath were detained by Bangladesh Police while Rifat was handed over to his family. Ramu Police filed a case against Shipra on 1 August saying that they recovered alcohol from her room. Sifat was charged with the murder of Major Sinha and for possession of narcotics, a separate charge in which they claimed to have recovered 250 grams of marijuana and 50 Ya ba tablets. Ain o Salish Kendra represented the students.

On 2 August 2020, the Public Security Division of the Ministry of Home Affairs created a four-man investigation team to look into the death of Khan. The team was led by Chittagong Additional Divisional Commissioner Mohammad Mizanur Rahman, and included Lieutenant Colonel Md Sajjad Hossain representing the Armed Forces Division, Chittagong Range Additional Deputy Inspector General Zakir Hossain Khan, and Cox's Bazar Additional District Magistrate Shahjahan Ali. On 12 August 2020, the team took statements from witnesses at Shamlapur Rohingya camp. The probe committee announced they would give a final report on 6 September 2020. It summitted the report a day later and it got leaked to the media.

Sharmin Shahriar Ferdous, sister of Khan, filed a murder case with the court on 5 August 2020. On 6 August 2020, six of the accused were taken into custody.

On 16 September 2020, Superintendent of Police ABM Masud Hossain was transferred to Rajshahi District. His withdrawal was demanded by the Retired Armed Forces Officer's Welfare Association to ensure a fair and neutral investigation. Later 1500, almost the entire police force in Cox's Bazar District, were transferred out of the district.

On 13 December 2020, charges were pressed against 15 individuals by the investigating officer, Senior Assistant Superintendent of Police Mohammad Khairul Islam of Rapid Action Battalion. The 15 accused included two top officers of Tekhnaf Police Station, Inspector Pradeep Kumar Das who was the officer in charge of the station and Inspector Liaqat Ali the head of investigations at the Baharchhara Police Outpost under Tekhnaf Police Station. Among the accused included Tekhnaf Police Station Sub-inspector Nandadulal Rakshit and three constables of the station, Abdullah Al Mamun, Mohammad Mostafa, Rubel Sharma, Sagar Deb, and Safanur Karim. The other accused came from the local unit of Armed Police Battalion including Sub-inspector Mohammad Shahjahan and two constables Mohammad Abdullah and Muhammad Rajib. Three locals were also charged in the case, they were Mohammad Ayaz, Nejamuddin, and Nurul Amin. The charge sheet was submitted before Senior Judicial Magistrate of Cox's Bazar District Tamanna Farah. constable Sagar Deb went on the run after the incident while the 14 other accused were in police custody. The investigation officer of Rapid Action Battalion also recommended department measures be taken against Superintendent of Police ABM Masud Hossain and described his actions as "unprofessional" and negligent.

== Investigation ==
According the investigation officer of Rapid Action Battalion, Khan had discovered evidence of Inspector Das' involvement in the Ya ba trade in Cox's Bazar District while making a documentary. He met inspector Das who then warned the major to leave Cox's Bazar. During the two years Inspector Das was in charge of Tekhnaf Police Station 87 people were killed in gunfights with the police.

Sagar Deb surrendered before the court on 24 June 2021 after being on the run for 10 months. On 27 June 2021, Cox's Bazar District and Sessions Judge's Court placed charges against 15 accused including 12 police officers.

On 24 August 2021, Sharmin Shahriar Ferdous gave her testimony at the Cox's Bazar District and Sessions Judge's Court. She alleged Khan was killed by Inspector Liaqat Ali at the instructions of Officer in Charge of Tekhnaf Police Station, Pradeep Kumar Das. During the trial, journalist Faridul Mostafa Khan testified that Inspector Das assaulted him and filed false cases against him after he wrote about the inspector's alleged involvement in the local drug trade. During the trial a witness identified inspector Ali as the one who shot the major and inspector Das confirmed the kill. On 2 December 2021, the court concluded the hearing the statements of the prosecution witnesses and set 6 to 8 December as the dates to hear the testimonies of the defense witnesses.

== Verdict ==
The court announced its verdict on 31 January 2022 with the 15 accused in the court. The two top officers, Inspectors Pradeep Kumar Das and Liaqat Ali, were sentenced to death. Six other accused were sentenced to life imprisonment and seven others were acquitted.
