= Hafchhari Union =

Union of Khagrachhari District, Chittagong, Bangladesh

Hafchhari হাফছড়ি
- Union
- Interactive map of Hafchhari
- Country: Bangladesh
- Division: Chittagong Division
- District: Khagrachhari District
- Upazila: Guimara Upazila

Area
  - Total: 88.06 km^{2} (34.00 sq mi)

Population (2022)
  - Total: 25,983
  - Density: 295.1/km^{2} (764.2/sq mi)
- Time zone: UTC+6 (BST)
- Postal code: 4460
- Website: hafchariup.khagrachhari.gov.bd

Hafchhari Union is a union of Guimara Upazila under Khagrachhari District.

== Demography ==
According to 2022 census, total population of the Union are 25,983. Among them, 10,952 are Muslim, 13,064 are Buddhist, 1,933 are Hindu, 33 are Christian and 1 are follower of others religion.

Religion-2022
1. Buddhism (50.3%)
2. Islam (42.1%)
3. Hinduism (7.44%)
4. Christianity (0.13%)
5. Others (0.00%)

== Ethnicity ==
This Union is home to a variety of different ethnic groups. Among them, 11,384 are Bengali, 11,294 are Marma, 1,706 are Tripura, 1,547 are Chakma and 52 are of others ethnic groups.

Ethnicity-2022
1. Bengali (43.8%)
2. Marma (43.5%)
3. Tripura (6.57%)
4. Chakma (5.95%)
5. Others (0.20%)
