= Mohammed Hossain Al Morshed =

Director General of National Security Intelligence of Bangladesh

- Alma mater: Bangladesh Military Academy National Defence College
- Military career
- Allegiance: Bangladesh
- Branch: Bangladesh Army
- Service years: 1992 – present
- Rank: Major General
- Unit: Bangladesh Infantry Regiment
- Commands: Adjutant General of Bangladesh Army; GOC of 19th Infantry Division; Commandant of [[Bangladesh Infantry Regimental Centre]; Senior Directing Staff (Army-2) of National Defence College; Commander of 81st Infantry Brigade; Commander of 21 Infantry Brigade
- Awards: Para Commando Brigade

Mohammed Hossain Al Morshed ndc, afwc, psc is a two star officer of Bangladesh Army and serving as the adjutant general. Before that he was the general officer commanding of the 19th Infantry Division. He is the former commandant of Bangladesh Infantry Regimental Centre.

== Education ==
Major General Morshed has successfully completed different professional military courses both at home and abroad with distinction. He is a graduate of the Defence Services Command and Staff College and the National Defence College. He successfully completed the Combat Survival Course in Malaysia, Operation Training on ATGM RAT-8 in China and the National Defence Course-27 in Nigeria.

== Military career ==
Morshed was commissioned with 26th BMA Long Course on 09 June 1992 in the Corps of Infantry.

In 2018, Morshed was the Commander of an Infantry Brigade and the chairman of the tournament committee at the Savar Golf Club.

Morshed served as Senior Directing Staff (SDS) at the National Defence College.

Morshed also served as Commandant Bangladesh Infantry Regimental Centre (BIRC).

In 2025 Maj General Morshed served as the General Officer Commanding (GOC) of 19 Infantry Division and Area Commander Ghatail Area.

In March 2026, he was posted to Army Headquarters as Adjutant General.

During his military career, Major General Morshed has served in various command, staff, and instructional appointments. He served as Platoon Commander, Adjutant and Term Commander at Bangladesh Military Academy and as Directing Staff in both Weapon Wing and Special Warfare Wing at the School of Infantry and Tactics (SI&T). He also served as Senior Directing Staff at the National Defence College. He served as Brigade Major of Headquarters 203 Infantry Brigade (Khagrachari Region) and as Colonel Staff at Headquarters 66 Infantry Division and Armed Forces Division.

=== United Nations peacekeeping missions ===
Major General Morshed completed his UN Missions as a PI Comd of BANBAT-4 in Sierra Leone and as Chief of Staff (COS) of the Western Brigade (Multinational) in DR Congo under MONUSCO. He also performed as a Military Planning Officer (P-4) at the United Nations Office to the African Union (UNOAU) in Ethiopia.
