= Universe Online =

Universe Online may refer to:

- Marvel Universe Online, a cancelled multiplayer game by Cryptic Studios
- Universe Online, an in-development multiplayer game by Colony Studios, using the HeroEngine
