= Retired Armed Forces Officers' Welfare Association =

Association to Provide Welfare to Retired Officers

- Formation: 1982
- Headquarters: Dhaka, Bangladesh
- Region served: Bangladesh
- Official language: Bengali
- Website: raowa.org

The Retired Armed Forces Officers' Welfare Association or RAOWA, is an association for the welfare of retired armed forces officers in Bangladesh.

== History ==
It was formed by members of two defunct organization Defence Officers' Retired Association (founded in 1960s) and Ex-Defence Officers (founded in 1974 by Lieutenant Colonel Hesamuddin Ahmed) on 18 June 1982. The Retired Armed Officers Welfare Association Club is located in Bangladesh. The government of Bangladesh in an agreement with the association decided to import 5,000 taxi cabs in 2013, which would only be driven by retired armed forces personnel. Major General Alauddin MA Wadud (Retd) is the current president of the association. Major General Kamruzzaman (Retd); Commodore Khurshid Malik (Retd); and Air Commodore Anisur Rahman (Retd) are the vice-chairman of the club for the year of 2021–2022. Lieutenant Colonel Kamrul Islam (Retd) is the new secretary general of RAOWA. RAOWA club is located in Mohakhali DOHS, Dhaka Bangladesh.

On 22 December 2020, the managing body of RAOWA club was dismissed by the Department of Social Welfare and replaced with servicing officer and civilian bureaucrats. The Ministry of Defense send a letter to RAOWA directing changes to the body including the selection of top three management positions rather than direct elections. The Daily Star described the incident as a "sad day for RAOWA". This followed the RAOWA calling for an investigation into the murder of Sinha Md Rashed Khan, a retired army major.
