= Fakhrul Ahsan =

Bangladeshi general

Fakhrul Ahsan BSP
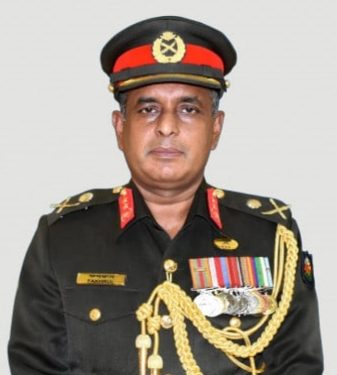
- Born: 1 November 1968 (age 57)
- Education: Bangladesh Military Academy
- Military career
- Allegiance: Bangladesh
- Branch: Bangladesh Army
- Service years: 1988–2026
- Rank: Major General
- Unit: East Bengal Regiment
- Commands: Force Commander of MINURSO; GOC of 10th Infantry Division; Commandant of Bangladesh Military Academy; Commander of 21st Infantry Brigade
- Conflicts: UNOSOM II; MONUSCO; Operation Twilight; MINURSO
- Awards: Bishishto Seba Padak (BSP)

Md Fakhrul Ahsan (Note: Bengali: ফখরুল আহসান) (Note: BSP, ndu, psc) is a retired major general in the Bangladesh Army and former force commander for MINURSO, the UN peacekeeping mission in the Sahara. Prior to joining there, he was the GOC of the 10th Infantry Division and area commander, Cox's Bazar Area. Before that, he served as commandant of Bangladesh Military Academy.

== Career ==
Ahsan was selected at the ISSB for the 19th (BMA) Long Course and was commissioned on 23 December 1988. During his posting as director of army military intelligence, he played a significant role in Operation Twilight. In his long career, he also served as assistant defence attaché at Bangladesh High Commission in New Delhi, India and in two peacekeeping missions, in Somalia (UNOSOM-II) and the Democratic Republic of the Congo (MONUC). He also served as commandant of Bangladesh Military Academy (BMA) in Bhatiary, Chattogram before taking over command of the 10th Infantry division. He assumed the appointment as Force Commander of MINURSO on 4 May 2023 and the mission bids farewell on 29 July 2026. He retires from Active service on August 2026.
