= 98th Composite Brigade =

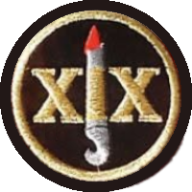
- Insignia of 19th Infantry division
- Active: June 23, 1998 – present
- Country: Bangladesh
- Branch: Bangladesh Army
- Type: Mixed
- Size: Brigade
- Part of: 19th Infantry Division
- Garrison/HQ: Jamuna Cantonment

Commanders
- Current commander: Classified
- Notable commanders: Brig Gen Sabbir Ahmed; Brig Gen Anwarul Momen

98th Composite Brigade, also known as the "Jamuna Brigade", is the first composite brigade formation of the Bangladesh Army.

== History ==
On June 23, 1998, Bangladeshi Prime Minister Sheikh Hasina inaugurated Bangabandhu Bridge over the Jamuna River in Tangail District and established the 98 Composite Brigade.

On January 29, 2015, Sheikh Hasina inaugurated the Bangabandhu Cantonment near the Bangabandhu Bridge and opened the newly built headquarters of the 98 Composite Brigade Office Building, Mess Complex, family residences for the officers, JCOs and soldiers.

== Functions ==
- Securing movement of troops and supplies along rivers.
- Ensuring overall security of the bridge.
- Secure the river routes and deny the enemy access.

== Formation ==
The 98 Composite Brigade is composed of a Riverine Engineers Battalion, an Air defence artillery unit and an infantry battalion. Soldiers and officers of the brigade were drawn from other units of the army.

== See also ==
- 99th Composite Brigade
