= Alikadam Union =

Union of Bandarban District, Chittagong, Bangladesh

Alikadam Sadar আলীকদম সদর
- Union
- Interactive map of Alikadam Sadar
- Country: Bangladesh
- Division: Chittagong Division
- District: Bandarban District
- Upazila: Alikadam Upazila

Area
  - Total: 756.28 km^{2} (292.00 sq mi)

Population (2022)
  - Total: 23,488
  - Density: 31.057/km^{2} (80.438/sq mi)
- Time zone: UTC+6 (BST)
- Postal code: 4650
- Website: alikadamsadarup.bandarban.gov.bd

Alikadam Sadar Union is a union of Alikadam Upazila under Bandarban District.

== Demography ==
According to 2022 census, total population of the Union are 23,488 . Among them, 16,405 are Muslim, 3,436 are Buddhist, 1,530 are Christian, 1,158 are Hindu and 959 are others.

Religion-2022
1. Islam (69.8%)
2. Buddhism (14.6%)
3. Christianity (6.51%)
4. Hinduism (4.93%)
5. Krama and Others (4.08%)

== Ethnicity ==
This Union is home to a variety of different ethnic groups. Among them, 18,161 are Bengali, 2,473 are Mru, 1,370 are Tripura, 623 are Marma and 861 are of others ethnic groups.

Ethnicity-2022
1. Bengali (77.3%)
2. Mru (10.5%)
3. Tripura (5.83%)
4. Marma (2.65%)
5. Others (3.67%)
