= Kristin Lund (general) =

Norwegian military general (born 1958)

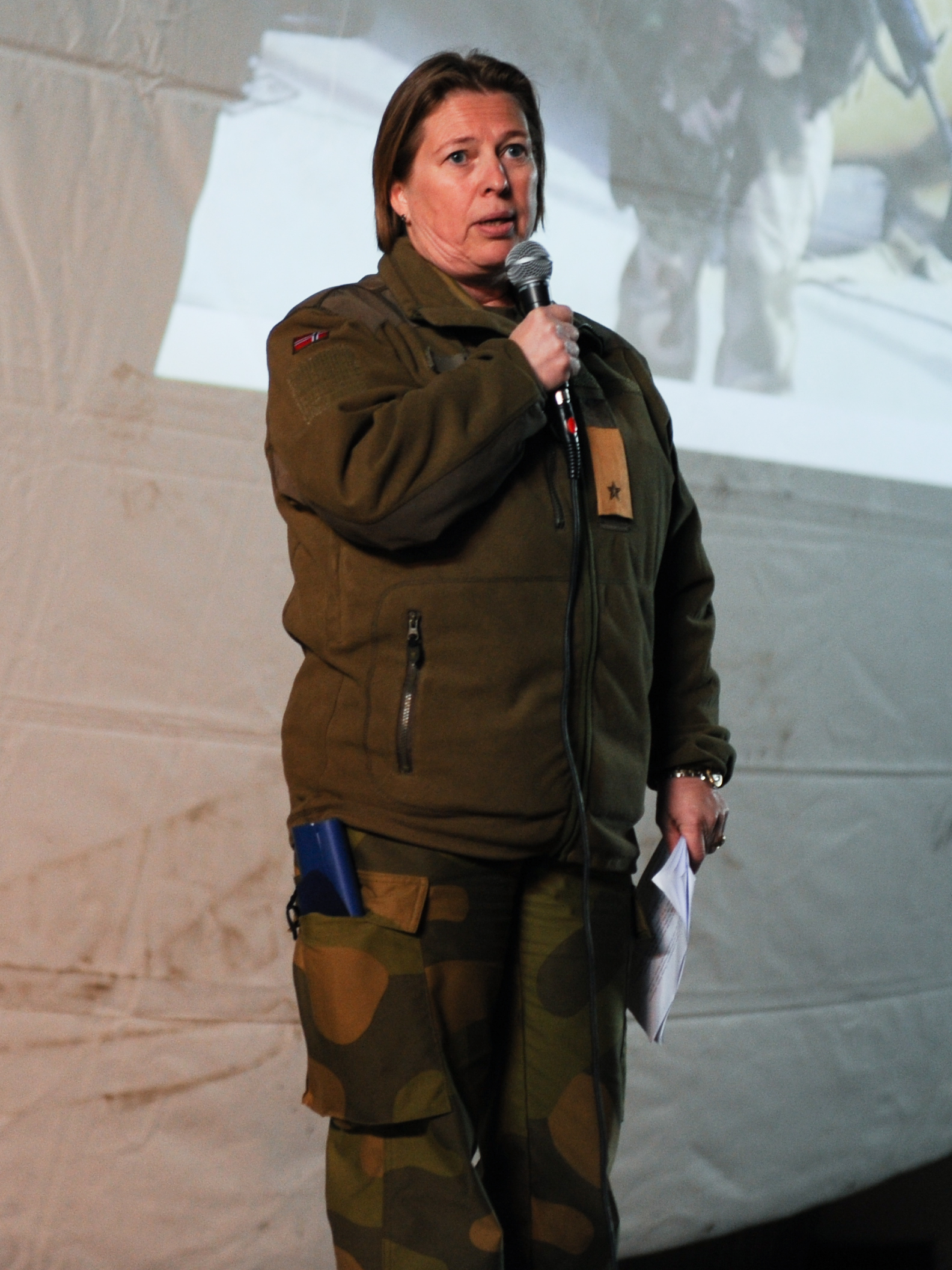
- Born: 16 May 1958 (age 68); Norway
- Military career
- Allegiance: Norway
- Branch: Norwegian Army
- Service years: 1979–2019
- Rank: Major General
- Commands: United Nations Truce Supervision Organization; United Nations Peacekeeping Force in Cyprus; Norwegian Home Guard
- Conflicts: Gulf War; War in Afghanistan
- Awards: Commander of the Royal Norwegian Order of Saint Olav; Defence Service Medal with Laurel Branch

Major General Kristin Lund (born 16 May 1958) is a retired senior officer of the Norwegian Army. She was the first woman to command a United Nations peacekeeping operation, serving as Force Commander for the United Nations Peacekeeping Force in Cyprus from 2014 to 2016 and later as Head of Mission/Chief of Staff of the United Nations Truce Supervision Organization from 2017 to 2019.

== Military career ==
Lund joined the Norwegian Army in 1979 and, in 1984, entered the Norwegian Military Academy for officer training. She served with the United Nations Interim Force in Lebanon in 1986, deployed to Saudi Arabia in support of Operation Desert Storm in 1991, was posted to the United Nations Protection Force in the Balkans from 1992 to 1993 and again from 1994 to 1995, and served as part of the headquarters of the International Security Assistance Force in Afghanistan from 2003 to 2004.

Lund attended the United States Army War College in 2006, graduating with a master's degree in strategic studies. She is also a graduate of the Norwegian Defense Command and Staff College and the Norwegian Defense University College. In 2007, Lund was appointed deputy commander of the Norwegian Army Forces Command. Two years later, in 2009, she became the first woman to be promoted to major general in the Norwegian Army and was appointed chief of the Norwegian Home Guard.

In 2014 Lund was appointed Head of Veteran Affairs for the Norwegian Defence Staff. On 12 May that year, United Nations Secretary-General Ban Ki-moon announced Lund's appointment as Force Commander of the United Nations Peacekeeping Force in Cyprus (UNFICYP). She succeeded China's Major General Chao Liu in the role on 13 August, and in doing so became the first woman to command a United Nations operation. After two years in Cyprus, Lund returned to Norway in July 2016 and was appointed an adviser at the Norwegian Defence University College in Oslo. She was again appointed to a United Nations command in October 2017, as Head of Mission/Chief of Staff of the United Nations Truce Supervision Organization (UNTSO) based in Jerusalem. Lund was the first woman to lead UNTSO, which had been formed in 1948 to monitor the ceasefire between Israel and Egypt, Jordan, Lebanon and Syria. Lund's tour ended in October 2019 and she retired from the Norwegian Army shortly after.

Military offices
| Preceded by Major General Chao Liu | Force Commander, United Nations Peacekeeping Force in Cyprus; 2014–2016 | Succeeded by Major General Mohammad Humayun Kabir |
| Preceded by Major General Dave Gawn | Chief of Staff, United Nations Truce Supervision Organization; 2017–2019 | Succeeded by Colonel Michael Scott (Acting) |
