= Sena Kalyan Sangstha =

Trust owned by the Bangladesh Armed Forces

- সেনা কল্যাণ সংস্থা
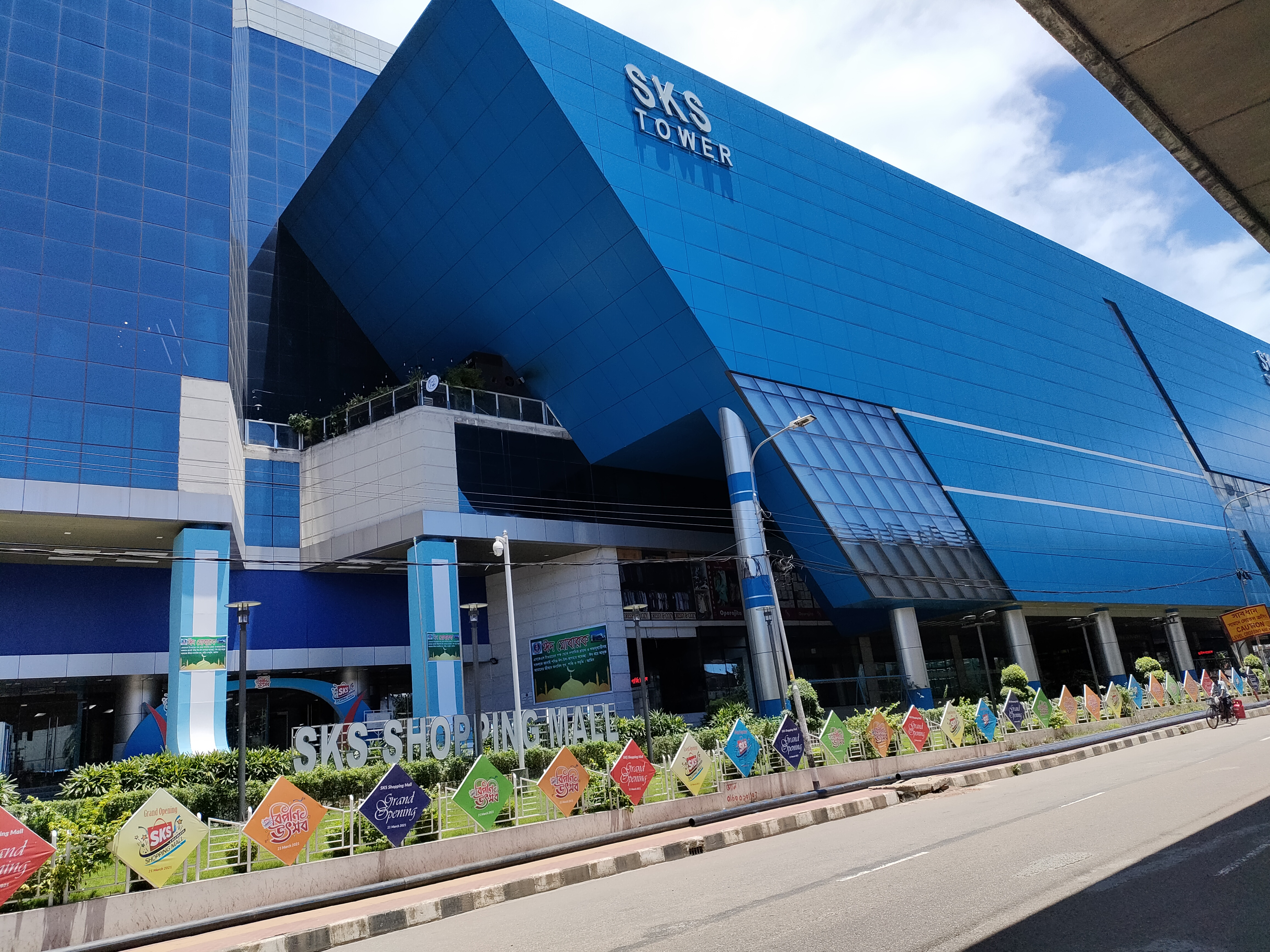
- SKS Tower, the headquarters in Mohakhali
- Abbreviation: SKS
- Predecessor: Fauji Foundation
- Formation: 1953; 73 years ago
- Type: State-owned enterprise
- Legal status: Welfare trust
- Headquarters: Bir Uttom Ziaur Rahman Road, Dhaka, Bangladesh
- Chairman: Major General Muhammad Sajjad Hossain
- Parent organization: Bangladesh Armed Forces
- Website: Website

Sena Kalyan Sangstha (Bengali: সেনা কল্যাণ সংস্থা, lit. 'Army Welfare Foundation') is a trust owned and operated by the Bangladesh Armed Forces. It owns a number of businesses including a travel agency, an electronics and cement factory and ice cream. Major General Muhammad Sajjad Hossain is the present chairman of Sena Kalyan Sangstha.

== History ==
The organization started in 1953 as the Fauji Foundation when Bangladesh was a province of Pakistan. After the independence of Bangladesh, it was renamed to Sena Kalyan Sangstha in 1972. Before shifting the head office to Mohakhali, it was headquartered in Motijheel in a 23-storey building named Sena Kalyan Bhaban. It started a rice mill and a flower mill during the pre-independence era. It also owns companies that includes Savoy Ice cream, Energy Savings Lamp, Habib fan, Citizen Fridge, Elephant cement, television and transformer factory.

In 2016, the trust signed a MOU with Bawani group of Saudi Arabia to export manpower. In 2013, the trust was appointed to construct a ৳3 billion convention center in the southern city Chittagong. In 2015, the trust launched Sena Kalyan Travels and Tours, a travel agency. The trust also owns a Liquefied petroleum gas plant.

In 2015, 7 workers were killed and 50 injured while constructing a warehouse for the trust in Mongla. The trust built Mongla Cement Factory with a loan from Pakistan that was secured in 1988. Sena Hotel Developments Limited, which operates Radisson Blu in Bangladesh, is owned by Sena Kalyan Sangstha and Bangladesh Army Welfare Trust.

On 29 August 2021, Bank Asia donated ৳5 million to Sena Kalyan Sangstha. The trust owns KB Petrochemicals Limited jointly with a Middle Eastern company and recently signed an agreement with Eastern Lubricants Blenders Limited, a state owned company.

== Officials of Sena Kalyan Sangstha ==
- Brigadier General Mohammad Mostafizur Rahman - Head of Human Resource Division
- Colonel Ahmed Jamil Yousuf - Company Secretary and Head of Corporate Affairs
- Colonel Md. Kamal Hossain Mamun - Head of Administration Division
- Group Captain Mizanur Rahman - Head of Finance Division
- Colonel Kamrul Ahsan - Head of Welfare Division

== Subsidiaries ==
- Sena Kalyan Constructions & Developments (SKCD)
- Mongla Cement Factory, Bagerhat
- Fauji Flour Mill, Chittagong
- Diamond Food Industries, Chittagong
- Chittagong Flour Mill, Chittagong
- Sena Kalyan Electric Industries, Chittagong
- Sena Kalyan Electronics
- Sena Kalyan Ready Mix Concrete, Mirpur, Dhaka
- Eastern Hosiery Mills, Tongi, Gazipur
- Sena tent and Textile Mills (formerly Enesel Textile Mills), Chittagong
- Sena Kalyan Edible Oil Industries
- Sena Kalyan LPG Bottling Plant
- Sena Filling and CNG Station
- Sena Kalyan Insurance Company Limited
- SKS Trading House
- Sena Kalyan Bhaban, Motijheel
- Amin Mohiuddin Foundation Building
- Sena Commercial Complex, Dhaka-Tongi Road
- SKS Shopping Complex (Formerly known as Anannya Shopping Complex), Baridhara DOHS
- Sena Kalyan Sangstha Tower, Mohakhali
- Sena Kalyan Business Mart, Tejgaon
- Sena Kalyan Trade Center, Agrabad, Chittagong
- SKS Convention Hall
- Sena Kalyan Travels and Tours
- Sena Kalyan Overseas Employment Services Limited
- Power Cell
- CPC
- E&MMA Cell
- SK Insurance Company LTD

== See also ==
- Bangladesh Army Welfare Trust
- Bangladesh Army
- Sena Paribar Kalyan Samity
- List of companies of Bangladesh
