= Army Service Corps =

Army Service Corps may refer to:

- Army Service Corps, a corps of the British Army which existed from 1870 to 1881 and again from 1888 to 1918, after which it was known as the Royal Army Service Corps until 1965
- Army Service Corps, a component of the Services of Supply, American Expeditionary Forces during World War I
- Indian Army Service Corps, a logistics arm of the Indian Army
- Pakistan Army Service Corps, a logistics and transport Crops of the Pakistan Army
- Royal Australian Army Service Corps
- Royal Canadian Army Service Corps
- Sri Lanka Army Service Corps
- United States Army Services of Supply, a branch of the United States Army created World War II and later renamed to the Army Service Forces
