= 99th Composite Brigade =

- Insignia of 9th Infantry Division
- Active: 19 September 2013 - present
- Country: Bangladesh
- Allegiance: Bangladesh
- Branch: Bangladesh Army
- Type: Mixed Arms
- Size: Brigade
- Part of: 9th Infantry Division
- Garrison/HQ: Padma Cantonment

Commanders
- Current commander: Classified
- Notable commanders: Brig Gen Humayun Kabir; Brig Gen Shakil Ahmed; Brig Gen Hamidul Haque

The 99th Composite Brigade (Bengali: ৯৯তম কম্পোজিট ব্রিগেড) is a brigade formation of the Bangladesh Army. It was raised per the project "Establishment of 99 Composite Brigade for Safety and Security of Padma Multipurpose Bridge" and army development project "Forces Goal 2030".

== History ==
On 19 September 2013, PM Sheikh Hasina raised the flag of newly established 99 Composite Brigade at Army Aviation Hangar. The flag raising of 58 East Bengal, 34 BIR and 20 Engineering Construction Battalion were hoisted on the same day.

The unit would need around 600mn taka ($7.5mn) annually which will be allocated from the funds of the army.

In 2014, army sought 326-acre land & Tk 17,740 million over four years to build the security installations for the bridge on both sides of the mega infrastructure.

ECNEC approved the project named "Establishment of 99 Composite Brigade for Safety and Security of Padma Multipurpose Bridge" on 115 acres of land on both the sides involving Taka 7,500 million on 13 October 2015 .

== Functions ==
- Implementation of the Padma Bridge project.
- Maintain security of the Padma Bridge.
- Oversee construction of the Padma bridge.
- Check for corruption.
- Discourage graft mongering firms and their officials.

== Formation ==
The 99 Composite Brigade comprises one Engineering Construction Battalion and two infantry battalions and an air defence artillery regiment. Soldiers and officers of the brigade were drawn from other units of the army.

== See also ==
- 98th Composite Brigade
