= Bangladesh Army University of Science and Technology, Saidpur =

University In Bangladesh

Bangladesh Army University of Science and Technology (BAUST)
- বাংলাদেশ আর্মি বিজ্ঞান ও প্রযুক্তি বিশ্ববিদ্যালয়(বিএইউএসটি)
- Motto: Discipline, Knowledge, Morality
- Type: Private
- Established: February 2015; 11 years ago
- Chancellor: President Mirza Fakhrul Islam Alamgir
- Vice-Chancellor: Brigadier General Mohammad Mobarak Hossain Majumder, PSC
- Students: 3000+
- Undergraduates: 1000+
- Postgraduates: 800+
- Doctoral students: 50
- Location: Saidpur Cantonment, Nilphamari, Bangladesh; 25.7631°N 88.9175°E
- Campus: Urban
- Colors: Green and Golden
- Website: baust.edu.bd

Bangladesh Army University of Science and Technology (BAUST) (Bengali: বাংলাদেশ আর্মি বিজ্ঞান ও প্রযুক্তি বিশ্ববিদ্যালয়) is an army-backed university in Saidpur, Nilphamari, Bangladesh.

== History ==
Army University of Science and Technology is one of the universities run by Bangladesh Army; Prime Minister on February 12, 2015. On February 15, 2015, It was inaugurated by Asaduzzaman Noor, former Minister of Cultural Affairs Ministry of Bangladesh in the presence of senior army officers of Bangladesh Army.

== Location ==
The main campus is located in Saidpur Upazila of Nilphamari with infrastructure support from Saidpur Cantonment. Saidpur is a town of Nilphamari district in Bangladesh, part of the Rangpur Division. Saidpur Airport is very close to the university campus.

== Faculties ==
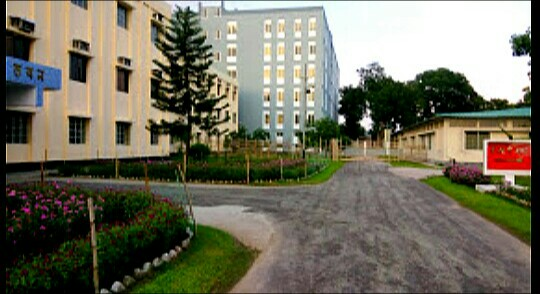
BAUST back view

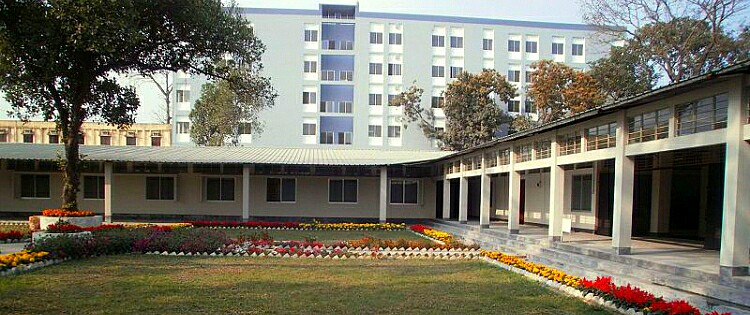

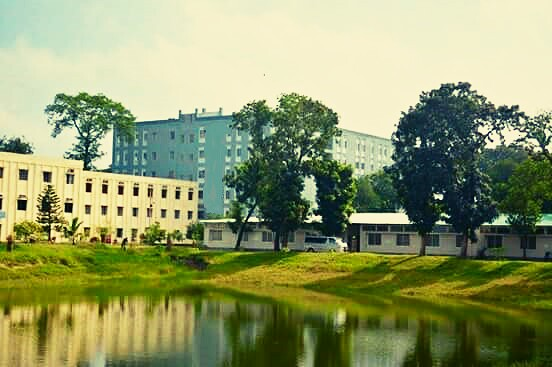
BAUST Campus

4 years B.Sc. undergraduate courses and engineering courses

=== Faculty of Electrical and Computer Engineering (ECE) ===
- Department of Computer Science & Engineering
- Department of Electrical & Electronic Engineering
- Department of Information & Communications Technology

=== Faculty of Mechanical Engineering (ME) ===
- Department of Mechanical Engineering
- Department of Industrial & Production Engineering also

=== Faculty of Civil Engineering(CE) ===
- Department of Civil Engineering

=== Faculty of Business Studies ===
- Department of Business Administration
- Department of Accounting and Information Systems

=== Faculty of Science & Humanities ===
- Department of English
- Department of Arts and Sciences

== Regulatory bodies ==
=== Academic Council of BAUST ===
==== Chairman ====
- Vice Chancellor, Bangladesh Army University of Science and Technology

==== Members ====
- Pro Vice Chancellor
- All Deans
- All Department/Institute Heads
- One Professor from Each Department
- Three Education Patron Nominated by Board of Trustees
- Two Educationalist Nominated by Syndicate

==== Member secretary ====
- Registrar, BAUST

== Student life ==
To break the monotony of study different cultural programs are arranged at regular intervals.

== Student's dress ==
It is mandatory for students to wear dress with displayed identity card as per 'Dress Code' prescribed by BAUST authority.

== Halls of residence ==
BAUST has individual halls for male and female students. Hostel administration is performed by the provost who is selected from one of the senior teachers of the all departments or Ex-Army Officer.

=== Abbas Uddin Ahmed Hall ===
Abbas Uddin Ahmed Hall (A U Ahmed Hall) is named after Abbasuddin Ahmed, the famous folk artist of Bangladesh. A U Ahmed Hall is a 4 storied building with only male students, having a capacity of 500 students. There are 20 staffs for hall. A U Ahmed Hall is known for the security of the students compared to the other hall in the country. Students get various modern facilities such as 24-hour electricity, 24/7 internet service, gym, games and sports facilities. Annual hall festival is being celebrated in November of every year.

=== Bir Protik Taramon Bibi Hall ===
Bir Protik Taramon Bibi Hall is named after Bir Protik Taramon Bibi, one of the two female freedom fighters in Bangladesh who had engaged in direct combat during the liberation war of Bangladesh in 1971 as a member of the Mukti Bahini (Liberation Army). Bir Protik Taramon Bibi hall is an 2 storied building with only female students, having a capacity of 300 students. There are 20 staffs for hall. As other two Halls, it is also known for the security of the students compared to the other hall in the country. Annual hall festival is being celebrated in November of every year like other two Halls.

=== Shaheed Dr. Zikrul Haque Hall ===
Shaheed Dr. Zikrul Haque Hall is named after Dr. Zikrul Haque, was a physician and politician, who was elected to the National Assembly of Pakistan in 1970. He was killed in the Bangladesh Liberation war and is considered a Martyr in Bangladesh. Shaheed Dr. Zikrul Haque Hall (Formerly New Hall) is a 5 storied building with only male students, having a capacity of 500 students. There are 20 staffs for hall. Shaheed Dr. Zikrul Haque Hall is known for the security of the students compared to the other hall in the country. Students get various modern facilities such as 24-hour electricity, 24/7 internet service, gym, games and sports facilities. Annual hall festival is being celebrated in November of every year.
