= Khagrachhari Cantonment =

Military quarters in Bangladesh

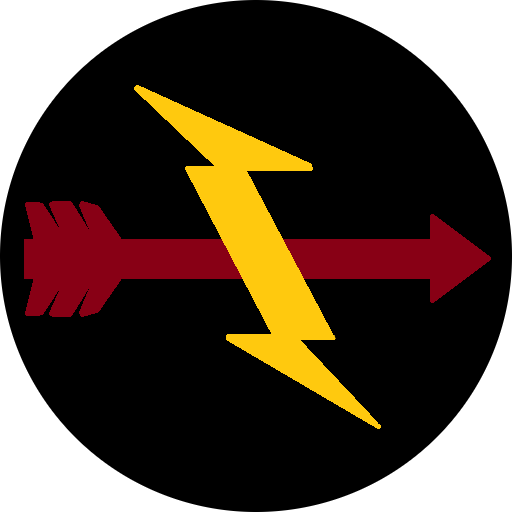
Khagrachhari Cantonment
- Khagrachhari, Chittagong, Bangladesh

Site information
- Type: Cantonment
- Controlled by: Bangladesh Army

Location
- Coordinates: 23.1176°N 91.9863°E

Khagrachhari Cantonment (Bengali: খাগড়াছড়ি সেনানিবাস, romanized: Khagrachhori Senanibas) is a cantonment located in Khagrachhari, Bangladesh. 203rd Infantry Brigade of Bangladesh Army inhabit here. It is under the jurisdiction of 24th Infantry Division.

It is one of five cantonments in Chittagong Hill Tracts area.

== Institutions ==
- Khagrachhari Cantonment Public School & College
- MDS (Hospital)

== See also ==
- Alikadam Cantonment
- Bandarban Cantonment
- Rangamati Cantonment
