= Mohammed Aftab Hossain =

Bangladeshi major general

Mohammed Aftab Hossain BSP, NDC, afwc, psc, MPhil, PhD
- Military career
- Allegiance: Bangladesh
- Branch: Bangladesh Army
- Service years: 1993-present
- Unit: Bangladesh Infantry Regiment
- Commands: GOC of 17th Infantry Division; Commandant of Bangladesh Infantry Regimental Centre; Commander of 72nd Infantry Brigade
- Conflicts: UNAMSIL

Mohammed Aftab Hossain is a two-star general of the Bangladesh Army. He is currently serving as General Officer Commanding, 17th Infantry Division and Area Commander, Sylhet Area. Earlier, he was Commandant of the Bangladesh Infantry Regimental Centre.

== Military career ==
Hossain was commissioned in June 1993, in to the Corps of Infantry from the 28th BMA Long Course.

As Brigadier, he served as commander of the 72nd Infantry Brigade. He also served as Defence Attaché to the Bangladeshi Ambassador to Myanmar. He was a part of the Bangladeshi team that handed over rescue materials to the Myanmar government after a deadly earthquake. He was dismissed after diplomatic tensions intensified between Bangladesh and Myanmar. He was later promoted to Major General and made the Commandant of the Bangladesh Infantry Regimental Centre.
