= Ramu Cantonment =

Bangladeshi military cantonment

Coordinates: 21.4324°N 92.1008°E

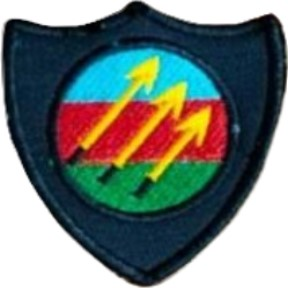
Ramu Cantonment
- রামু সেনানিবাস
- Ramu, Cox's Bazar District, Bangladesh
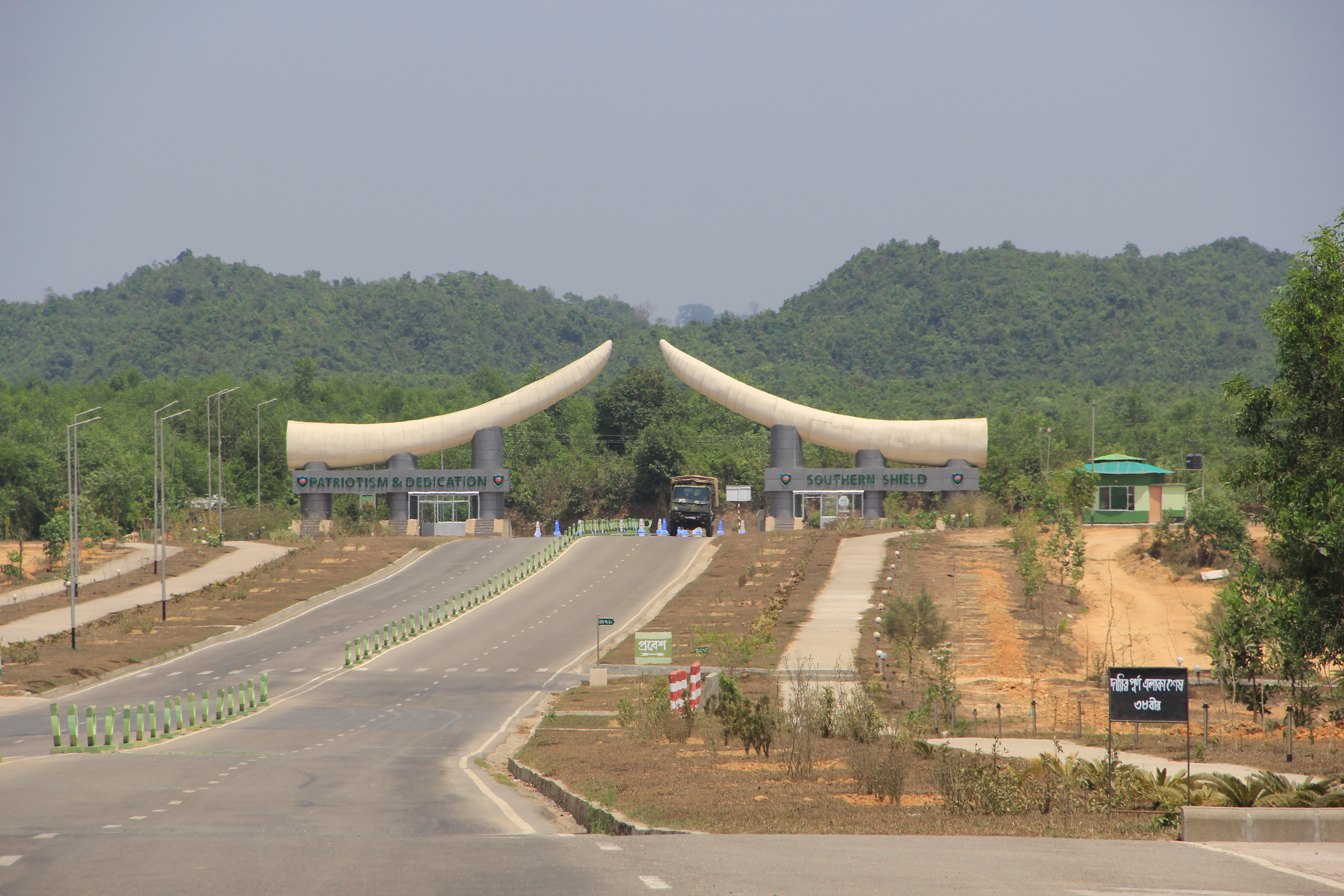
- Gate No. 2 of Ramu Cantonment

Site information
- Type: Cantonment
- Controlled by: Bangladesh Army

Site history
- Built: 12 October 2014
- In use: 1 March 2015 - present

Ramu Cantonment (Bengali: রামু সেনানিবাস) is a cantonment located in Ramu, Cox's Bazar District, Bangladesh. It is the headquarters of 10th Infantry Division of Bangladesh Army. The area of the cantonment is 3000 acres.

== History and layout ==
Ramu camp was established at the onset of Chittagong Hill Tracts Conflict. Then, this area was installed under 24th Infantry Division, with at least an infantry battalion under 69th Infantry Brigade and a divisional support engineers company used to be stationed here. Due to 2015 Rohingya refugee crisis, eve of tensity at Rakhine Conflict and recent skirmishes with Myanmar, the ministry of defence proposed to ameliorate a new formation across the southeastern coast during Third Hasina ministry.

=== Establishment of cantonment ===
The Environment Ministry confirmed in April 2014 the plan for a new cantonment in Ramu. The army was allocated 1,800 acres of forest land in Ramu, Cox's Bazar. Of those 1,180 acres in Rajarkul, 264.55 acres in Khuniyapalang, and 344.43 acres in Umakhali Mouza.

On 10 March 2016, Prime Minister Sheikh Hasina inaugurated construction of a road titled "Bir Sarani", memorial "Ajeyo" commemorating the division, a multipurpose shade "Birangan" and a composite barrack named "Matamuhuri" built at Alikadam Cantonment.

=== Infrastructure development ===
On 19 August 2026, the Executive Committee of the National Economic Council approved a Tk 1,311.53 crore infrastructure development project for Ramu Cantonment. The project will be founded entirely by the government and is intended in part to address inadequate accommodation for more than 8,000 soldiers. The government also directed that the natural terrain of the hilly area be preserved during construction, with buildings designed according to the existing elevation of the land rather than by cutting and leveling the hills.

== Key installations ==
- 10th Infantry Division
  - 2nd Infantry Brigade

== Educational institutions ==
- Ramu Cantonment English School and College (RCESC)
- Shaheed Lieutenant Tanzim Cantonment Public School and College (SLTCPSC)

== See also ==
- Alikadam Cantonment
