= Rangamati Cantonment =

Bangladeshi military cantonment

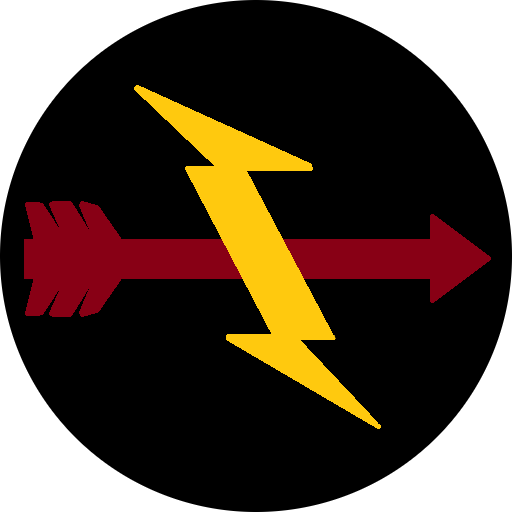
Rangamati Cantonment
- Rangamati, Chittagong, Bangladesh

Site information
- Type: Cantonment
- Controlled by: Bangladesh Army

Location
- Coordinates: 22.65°N 92.17°E

Rangamati Cantonment (Bengali: রাঙ্গামাটি সেনানিবাস) is a cantonment located in Rangamati. 305th Infantry Brigade of Bangladesh Army is situated here under 24th Infantry Division.

It is one of several cantonments in Chittagong Hill Tracts area.

== Institutions ==
- Lakers Public School & College

== See also ==
- List of formations of the Bangladesh Army
- Alikadam Cantonment
- Bandarban Cantonment
- Kaptai Cantonment
