= Rangpur Cantonment =

Bangladeshi military cantonment

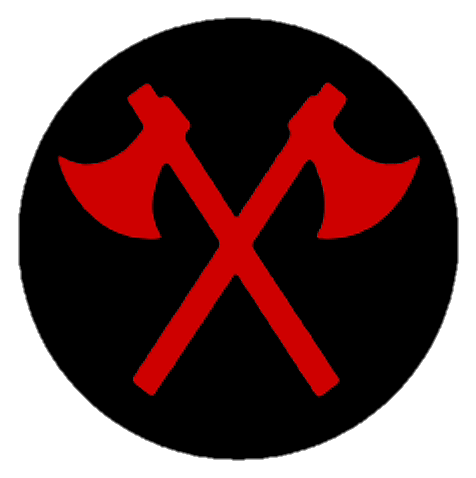
Rangpur Cantonment
- রংপুর সেনানিবাস
- Rangpur City, Rangpur, Bangladesh
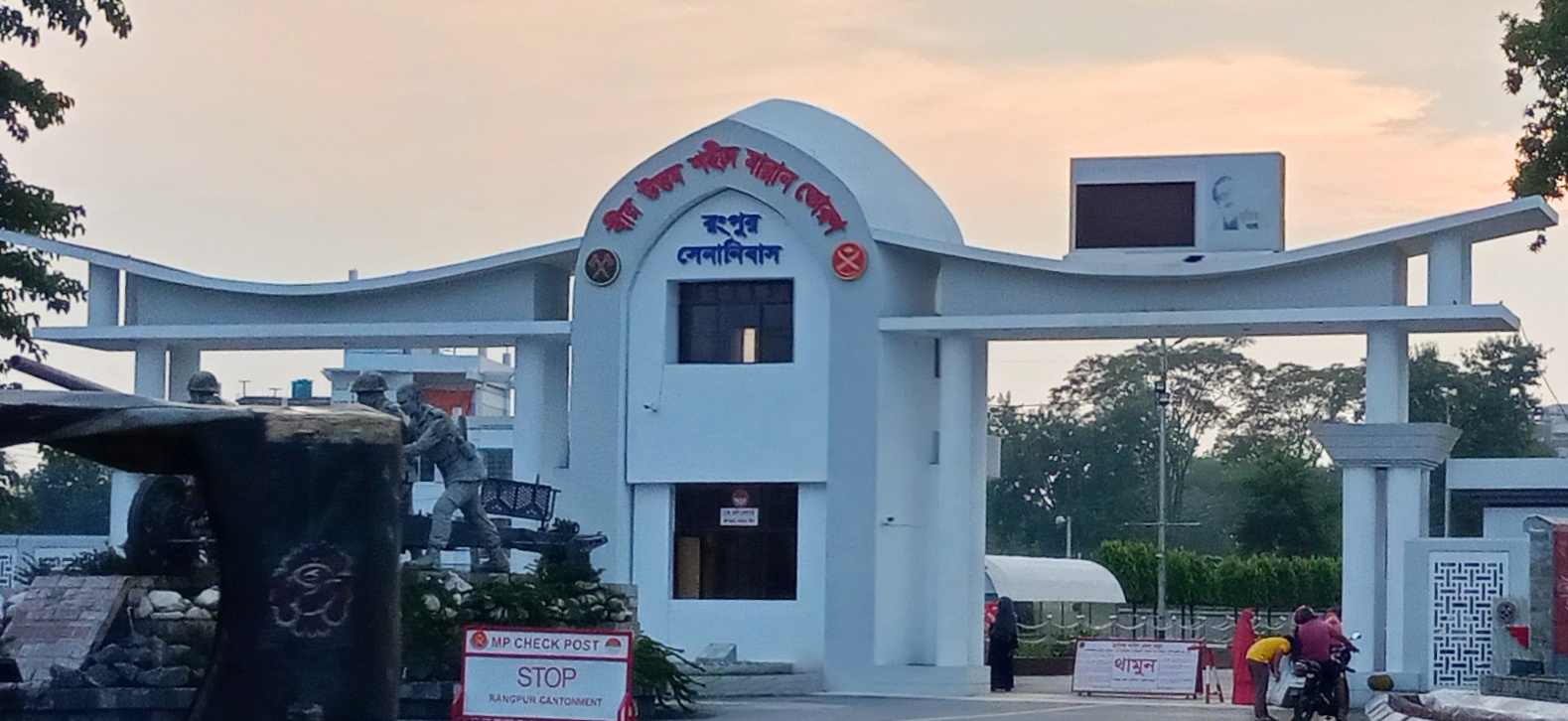
- Rangpur Cantonment

Site information
- Type: Military base
- Controlled by: Bangladesh Army

Garrison information
- Current commander: Major General A. B. M. Faisal Baten

Rangpur Cantonment (Bengali: রংপুর সেনানিবাস) is a cantonment located in Rangpur, Bangladesh. It is the headquarters of 66th Infantry Division of the Bangladesh Army.

== History ==
Insignia of Rangpur Area Command

Seal of the Rangpur Cantonment Board

On 1 March 1971, General Yahya Khan indefinitely postponed the first meeting of the recently elected National Assembly. In response, Sheikh Mujibur Rahman called a general strike. On 3 March, thousands of locals of Rangpur violated curfew to protest against the regime. Three protestors were killed.

During the night of 25 March, the Pakistan Army launched Operation Searchlight, which led to civil war. At the time, the Pakistani Army's 23 Infantry Brigade was stationed at the cantonment. On 28 March, thousands of Bengalis attacked the cantonment with clubs, spears, and arrows. The army returned fire with automatic weapons, killing about 600 Bengalis.

India's 66th Mountain Brigade accepted the surrender of the cantonment's Pakistani garrison on 17 December.

After independence, in February 1972, the Bangladesh Army's 72 Infantry Brigade was raised at the cantonment. The 14 East Bengal and 15 East Bengal regiments were raised from forces that had fought in sector 6.

During the 7 November 1975 Bangladeshi coup d'état, mutineers killed more than 15 army officers in the cantonment. The Statesman reported that the government appealed over the radio for former freedom fighters to report to the nearest cantonment for recruitment into the army. More than 200 who did so at Rangpur cantonment were promptly arrested to keep them from joining the mutineers.

== Institutions ==
- Rangpur Cadet College
- Cantonment Public School and College, Rangpur
- Rangpur Army Medical College
- Rangpur Army Medical College Shopping Mall
- Bir Uttam Shaheed Mahbub Senanibas
- Rangpur Cantonment Golf Club
- The Millennium Stars School & College
- Bangladesh Army University of Science and Technology
