= Guimara Union =

Union of Khagrachhari District, Chittagong, Bangladesh

Guimara গুইমারা
- Union
- Interactive map of Guimara
- Country: Bangladesh
- Division: Chittagong Division
- District: Khagrachhari District
- Upazila: Guimara Upazila

Area
  - Total: 90.65 km^{2} (35.00 sq mi)

Population (2022)
  - Total: 18,288
  - Density: 201.7/km^{2} (522.5/sq mi)
- Time zone: UTC+6 (BST)
- Postal code: 4460
- Website: guimaraup.khagrachhari.gov.bd

Guimara Union is a union of Guimara Upazila under Khagrachhari District.

== Demography ==
According to 2022 census, total population of the Union are 18,288. Among them, 4,457 are Muslim, 7,470 are Hindu, 6,328 are Buddhist, 21 are Christian and 12 are follower of others religion.

Religion-2022
1. Hinduism (40.9%)
2. Buddhism (34.6%)
3. Islam (24.4%)
4. Christianity (0.11%)
5. Others (0.07%)

== Ethnicity ==
This Union is home to a variety of different ethnic groups. Among them, 6,418 are Bengali, 5,941 are Tripura, 4,738 are Marma, 1,170 are Chakma and 21 are of others ethnic groups.

Ethnicity-2022
1. Bengali (35.1%)
2. Tripura (32.5%)
3. Marma (25.9%)
4. Chakma (6.40%)
5. Others (0.11%)
