= Trust Bank =

Private commercial bank in Bangladesh

Trust Bank PLC.
- Company type: Private
- Industry: Banking
- Founded: 1999; 27 years ago in Dhaka, Bangladesh
- Headquarters: Shadhinota Tower, Bir Srestha Shahid Jahangir Gate, Dhaka Cantonment, Dhaka, Bangladesh
- Products: Banking services, ATM services, Consumer Banking, Corporate Banking, Investment Banking, Islamic Banking, Treasury Management, Internet Banking, Locker Services
- Operating income: ▲ ৳17.779 million (US$140,000) (2023)
- Total assets: ▲ ৳453.829 million (US$3.7 million) (2023)
- Parent: Army Welfare Trust
- Subsidiaries: Trust Bank Securities Limited (TBSL) Trust Bank Investment Limited (TBIL) Trust Axiata Digital Limited (TADL)
- Rating: Long Term: AA1 Short Term: ST-1
- Website: tblbd.com

Trust Bank PLC. is a private commercial bank that was established in 1999 in Bangladesh. It is backed by Army Welfare Trust of Bangladesh Army. General Waker-Uz-Zaman, the incumbent Chief of Army Staff of Bangladesh Army is its chairman. It is one of the leading private commercial banks having a network of 119 branches, 8 sub-branches and 282 ATM booths across Bangladesh.

== History ==
In 1999, the Bangladesh Army Welfare Trust established Trust Bank Limited.

In 2001, the bank introduced automated branch banking system. In 2005, the bank introduced ATM services for its customers.

In January 2007, Trust Bank launched online banking services. Customers can now deposit or withdraw money from any branch of Trust Bank nationwide without needing to open multiple accounts in multiple branches.

In November 2008, Trust Bank denied allegations by Mahmudur Rahman that its former chairman, Hasan Mashhud Chowdhury, was involved with laundering money from the bank in 2002. Trust Bank announced 10 per cent dividends in 2008 at the 9th annual general meeting of the bank.

The Bank opened a merchant banking wing in 2009.

In 2020, the consolidated net profit for the bank was 650 million taka.

On 2 August 2022, Trust Bank held its the 23rd Annual General Meeting online chaired by the vice-chairman of the bank, Major General Md Moshfequr Rahman. The meeting approved a 22.5 dividend for the year. The bank signed an agreement with Bengal Commercial Bank Limited to facilitate money transfer through Ria Money Transfer. Trust Axiata Pay, also known as TAP, is a money transfer service owned by Trust Bank Limited. TAP has an agreement with Canteen Stores Department for processing payments.
