= 66th Infantry Division (Bangladesh) =

Division of the Bangladesh army

- Insignia of 66th Infantry Division
- Active: 1977–present
- Country: Bangladesh
- Branch: Bangladesh Army
- Type: Infantry
- Size: Division
- Garrison/HQ: Rangpur Cantonment
- Nickname: Defenders of the Strategic North

Commanders
- Current commander: Major General ABM Faisal Baten
- Notable commanders: Major General Zahirul Alam; Major General Sabbir Ahmed; Major General Shakil Ahmed; Major General Salahuddin Miaji

Insignia
- Division flag

The 66th Infantry Division (Bengali: ৬৬ পদাতিক ডিভিশন) is a formation of the Bangladesh Army based in Rangpur Cantonment.

== History ==
In 1966, Lieutenant General Yaqub Khan of Pakistan Army proposed a new infantry division to be ameliorate at then northern East Pakistan. Then commander in chief General Yahya Khan rejected the proposal, instead transferred the newly formed 23rd Infantry Brigade of then 14th Infantry Division (headquartered at Dacca) to Rangpur, with some components of engineers, signals battalion and East Pakistan Rifles stationed at Dinajpur and Nilphamari. Pakistan army surrendered the installation on 18 December 1971. The 72nd Independent Infantry brigade established on 26 February 1972 in Rangpur Cantonment under Colonel Chitta Ranjan Dutta. It was then annexed in and ameliorated as an infantry division on 1977 with the inclusion of 222nd Infantry Brigade formed at Saidpur and 66th Artillery Brigade in Kholahati Cantonment. Major General Amzad Ahmed Chowdhury was appointed as the first GOC. The 16th Infantry Brigade was formed at Kholahati in January 2006. Major General Faizur Rahman, then commander of the division oversaw the maneuver exercise at Swarna Dweep, Chittagong on 2022.

== Formation ==
Under the division, there is three infantry brigades, one artillery brigade, and one armoured regiment.

Combat Arms

- Cavalry
  - 7th Horse Regiment
- Regiment of Artillery
  - 66th Artillery Brigade
- Infantry
  - 16th Infantry Brigade
  - 72nd Infantry Brigade
  - 222nd Infantry Brigade
- Signals
  - 11th Brigade Signal Company

Service

- 121 Field Workshop Company
