= Guimara Upazila =

Guimara গুইমারা উপজেলা
- Upazila
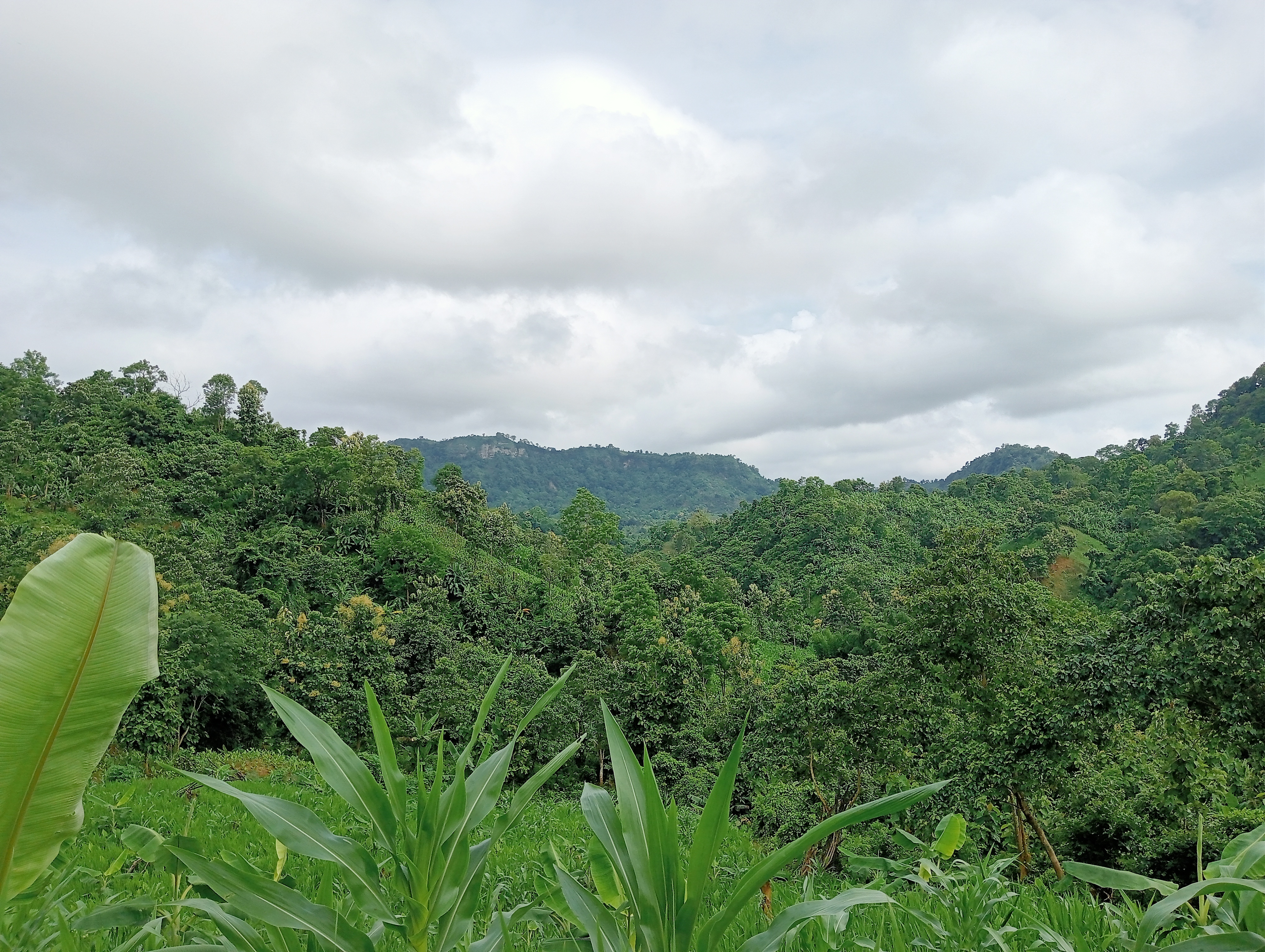
- Hills in Guimara

- Coordinates: 22°57′35″N 91°52′05″E
- Country: Bangladesh
- Division: Chittagong
- District: Khagrachhari

Area
  - Total: 243.46 km^{2} (94.00 sq mi)

Population (2022)
  - Total: 53,258
  - Density: 218.75/km^{2} (566.57/sq mi)
- Time zone: UTC+6 (BST)

Guimara Upazila (Bengali: গুইমারা উপজেলা) is an upazila (sub-district) of Khagrachhari District, Chittagong Division, Bangladesh.

== History ==
Guimara Upazila was established as an upazila on 30 November 2020. As of 2020, the administrative building has not been built. The upazila is administered from Guimara Union Parishad Complex Bhaban due to the lack of a purpose built administrative building. Brigadier General Mohammad Shahriar Jaman is the commander of the Guimara region.

== Administration ==
UNO: Rajeeb Chowdhury.

It has an area of 243.46 km2.

The upazila has three unions:

- Guimara Union
- Hafchhari Union
- Sindukchhari Union

== Demographics ==
According to the 2022 Bangladeshi census, Guimara Upazila had 12,358 households and a population of 53,258. 10.58% of the population were under 5 years of age. Guimara had a literacy rate (age 7 and over) of 66.41%: 72.09% for males and 60.69% for females, and a sex ratio of 100.95 males for every 100 females. 10,810 (20.30%) lived in urban areas.

=== Ethnicity and religion ===
Religions in Guimara Upazila (2022)
Religion	Percent
Buddhism	46.74%
Islam	30.60%
Hinduism	22.51%
Other or not stated	0.15%

Population by religion in Union
Union	Muslim	Hindu	Buddhist	Others
Guimara	4,457	7,470	6,328	33
Hafchhari	10,952	1,933	13,064	34
Sindukchhari	886	2,587	5,501	11

🟨 Buddhist majority 🟧 Hindu majority

The ethnic population was 34,303 (64.41%), of which Marma were 20,293, Tripura were 10,007, and Chakma 3,927.

Ethnicity in Guimara (2022)
1. Marma (38.1%)
2. Bengali (35.6%)
3. Tripura (18.8%)
4. Chakma (7.37%)
5. Others (0.15%)

Population by ethnicity in Union
Union	Bengali	Marma	Tripura	Chakma	Others
Guimara	6,418	4,738	5,941	1,170	21
Hafchhari	11,384	11,294	1,706	1,547	52
Sindukchhari	1151	4,261	2,360	1,210	3

🟩 Bengali majority 🟦 Marma majority
