= 10th Infantry Division (Bangladesh) =

Division of the Bangladesh army

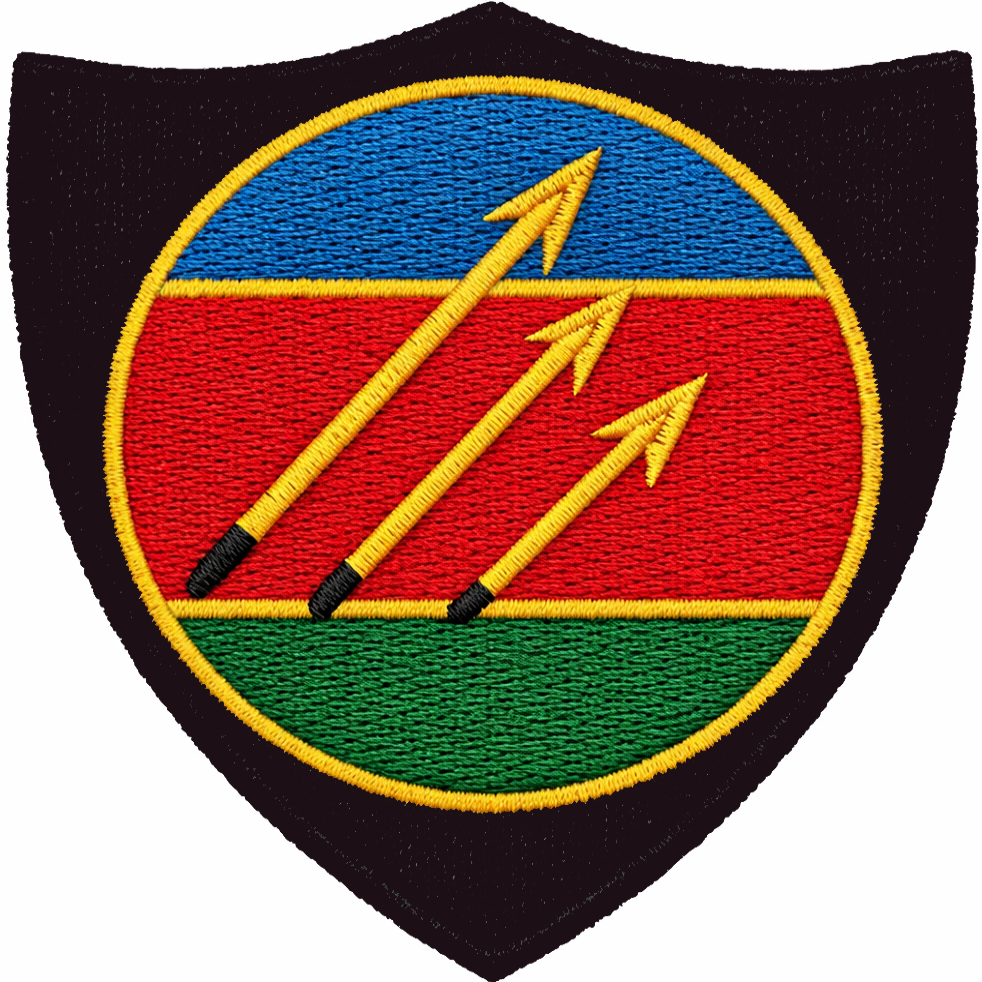
- Insignia of 10th Infantry Division
- Active: 1 March 2015 - present
- Country: Bangladesh
- Branch: Bangladesh Army
- Type: Infantry
- Size: Division
- Garrison/HQ: Ramu Cantonment

Commanders
- Current commander: Major General Gulam Mahiuddin Ahmed
- Notable commanders: Major General Fakhrul Ahsan; Major General Ataul Hakim Sarwar; Major General Minhazul Alam

The 10th Infantry Division (Bengali: ১০ম পদাতিক ডিভিশন) is a formation of the Bangladesh Army and one of the three divisions of Chittagong Division. It's located in the city of Cox's Bazar in southeastern Bangladesh. It was formed as part of the development vision of Bangladesh Armed Forces Forces Goal 2030.It has Alikadam Cantonment and Ramu Cantonment under its jurisdiction.

== History ==
Chittagong Division has a history of ethnic and religious strife. With a purpose of tackling the corresponding problem and protecting the new maritime boundary, it was necessary to increase army's capability in the area. Considering this, initiative and corresponding measures were taken to form an infantry division as it was also part of the development vision of Bangladesh Armed Forces Forces Goal 2030.

On 19 April 2014, Ministry of Defense confirmed the approval for a new cantonment in Ramu.

Sheikh Hasina formally announced formation of the 10th Infantry Division, as well the brigade and regiments under its command by raising the flag on 1 March 2015.

Flag of seven units including that of the 2nd Infantry Brigade was hoisted on 10 March 2016. Flag hoisting ceremony of the seven newly formed units was held on 9 February 2017. Flag hoisting program of 4 new units was held on 20 February 2018.

== Formation ==
There are two infantry brigades and an artillery brigade, comprising nine infantry regiments and four artillery regiments respectively. Two engineering battalions and other various units including SSD Ramu and two field workshop units are under the supervision of the 10th Infantry Division. Major General Mohammad Asadullah Minhazul Alam is the current General Officer Commanding of the division.

10th Infantry Division

- Area Headquarters, Ramu, Cox's Bazar
- Station Headquarters, Alikadam, Bandarban
- Station Headquarters, Ramu, Cox's Bazar
  - Combined Military Hospital, Ramu, Cox's Bazar
  - Garrison Engineers (Army), Ramu, Cox's Bazar
  - Static Signal Company, Ramu, Cox's Bazar
  - Station ST Battalion

Combat Arms

- Artillery
  - 10th Artillery Brigade, Ramu
    - 1st Field Regiment Artillery
    - 10th Medium Regiment Artillery
    - 12th Field Regiment Artillery
  - 16th Field Regiment Artillery
  - 29 Div Locating Artillery
- Armoured:
  - 16th Cavalry Regiment
- Infantry:
  - 2nd Infantry Brigade, Ramu
    - 9th East Bengal Regiment
    - 14th Bangladesh Infantry Regiment
    - 60th East Bengal Regiment
  - 1st East Bengal Regiment
  - 8th East Bengal Regiment
  - 26th East Bengal Regiment
  - 63rd East Bengal Regiment
  - 24th Bangladesh Infantry Regiment
  - 27th Bangladesh Infantry Regiment
  - 36th Bangladesh Infantry Regiment
  - 37th Bangladesh Infantry Regiment
  - 38th Bangladesh Infantry Regiment
  - 39th Bangladesh Infantry Regiment
  - 97th Infantry Brigade, Alikadam Cantonment

Combat support

- Ordnance Corps
  - 509th Division Ordnance Company
  - 10th Independent Ammunition Platoon
- Corps of Signals (Sig)
  - 9th Signal Battalion
- Corps of Engineers
  - 6th Engineer Battalion

Combat Service support

Army Medical Corps

- Army Service Corps
  - 39th Supply and Transport Battalion
- Army Medical Corps
  - 55th field ambulance
