= Padma Cantonment =

Bangladeshi military cantonment

Padma Cantonment
- পদ্মা সেনানিবাস
- Mawa & Jajira, Padma Bridge, Dhaka, Bangladesh

Site information
- Type: Cantonment
- Controlled by: Bangladesh Army

Padma Cantonment (formerly known as Sheikh Russel Cantonment) is a Bangladeshi military cantonment near the Padma Bridge in Munshiganj and Shariatpur Districts of Bangladesh. The cantonment has been established to ensure overall security of the bridge as it will be the main link of the highway connectivity between South Bengal and other parts of Bangladesh.

== Units ==
Commands under 9th Infantry Division

- 99th Composite Brigade

== See also ==
- Padma River
- Jamuna Cantonment
