= 19th Infantry Division (Bangladesh) =

Division of Bangladesh Army

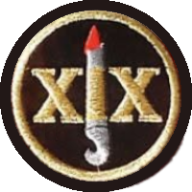
- Insignia of 19th Infantry Division
- Active: 1 July 1992 - present
- Country: Bangladesh
- Branch: Bangladesh Army
- Type: Infantry
- Size: Division
- Garrison/HQ: Shaheed Salahuddin Cantonment
- Motto: Bearers of the Holy Number

Commanders
- Current commander: Major General Sayeed Anowar Mahmood
- Notable commanders: Major General M. Harun-Ar-Rashid; Major General Moeen U Ahmed; Major General Belal Shafiul Haque; Major General Shafiuddin Ahmed

The 19th Infantry Division (Bengali: ১৯ পদাতিক ডিভিশন) is a formation of the Bangladesh Army based in Shahid Salahuddin Cantonment, located at Ghatail Upazila, Tangail District, Bangladesh.

== History ==
19th Infantry Division was established in Momenshahi Cantonment on 1 July 1992. At first the division was composed of 77th Infantry Brigade and 309th Infantry Brigade (stationed at Shahid Salahuddin Cantonment in Ghatail) consigned from the 9th Infantry Division. 19th Infantry division was fully ameliorated in December 1993 with the formation of 19th Artillery brigade. On 23 June 1998, the 98th Composite brigade established by former prime minister Sheikh Hasina on the inauguration of Jamuna Bridge. The divisional headquarters permanently moved to Shahid Salahuddin Cantonment in April 2006 for the formation of ARTDOC. On 27 March 2021, this division hosted Indian veterans of the Bangladesh Liberation war at Shahid Salahuddin Cantonment under the orchestration of Major General Sayed Tareq Hussain.

== Formation ==
Under the division, there is two infantry brigade, one artillery brigade, one composite brigade and one armoured regiment. An air defence unit is placed here as well.

Combat Arms

- Cavalry
  - 4th Horse Regiment
- Regiment of Artillery
  - 19th Artillery Brigade
- Infantry
  - 25th Bangladesh Infantry Regiment
  - 77th Infantry Brigade
  - 309th Infantry Brigade
  - 98th Composite Brigade

Combat support

- Engineer
  - 11th Engineers Regiment
  - 26th Engineers Regiment
- Signals
  - 32nd Signals Company

Under service arms, there are a field ambulance unit, an ordnance depot and an EME Workshop is placed under.
