= Kholahati Cantonment =

Bangladeshi military cantonment

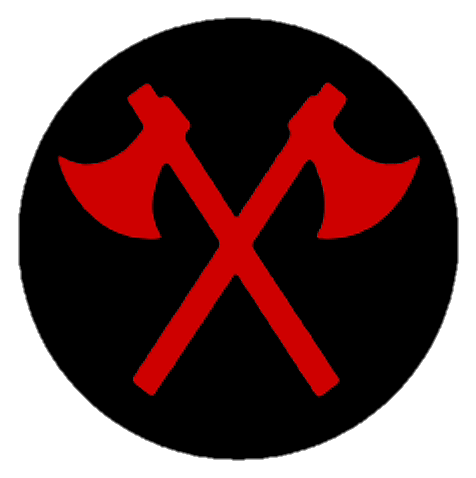
Bir Uttam Shaheed Mahbub Cantonment
- বীর উত্তম শহীদ মাহবুব সেনানিবাস
- Parbatipur, Rangpur, Bangladesh

Site information
- Type: Cantonment
- Controlled by: Bangladesh Army

Location
- Coordinates: 25.6519°N 88.9833°E

Bir Uttam Shaheed Mahbub Cantonment (also known as Kholahati Cantonment) is a Bangladeshi military cantonment in Parbatipur, Dinajpur District, Bangladesh. The headquarters of 66th Artillery Brigade and 16th Infantry Brigade under the 66th Infantry Division are situated here. It was named after the liberation war martyr Bir Uttam Shaheed Captain Mahbububur Rahman (1944 - 1971).

== Education ==
- Cantonment Public School & College, Kholahati.
- Cantonment Board High School, BUSMS
