= Bandarban Cantonment =

Military quarters in Bandarban, Bangladesh

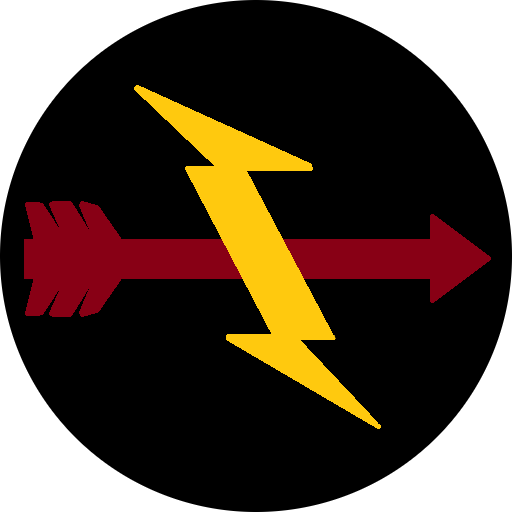
Bandarban Cantonment
- Bandarban, Chittagong, Bangladesh

Site information
- Type: Cantonment
- Controlled by: Bangladesh Army

Location
- Coordinates: 22.2017°N 92.2133°E

Bandarban Cantonment (Bengali: বান্দরবন সেনানিবাস) is a cantonment located in Bandarban. The headquarters of 69th Infantry Brigade of Bangladesh Army is located here. It is one of six cantonments in the Chittagong Hill Tracts area.

== Installations ==
Commands under 24th Infantry Division

- 69th Infantry Brigade
- Station Headquarters, Bandarban
  - SSD, Bandarban
  - OSP-3

The cantonment also has field ambulance, and companies from field workshop, as well as signals attached under brigade headquarters.

== See also ==
- Comilla Cantonment
- Alikadam Cantonment
- Guimara Cantonment
- Khagrachhari Cantonment
