= 9th Infantry Division (Bangladesh) =

Division of the Bangladesh army

- Insignia of 9th Infantry Division
- Active: November 1975 - present
- Country: Bangladesh
- Branch: Bangladesh Army
- Type: Infantry
- Size: Division
- Garrison/HQ: Savar Cantonment

Commanders
- Current commander: Major General Molla Mohammad Kamruzzaman
- Notable commanders: Major General Mir Shawkat Ali; Major General Hasan Sarwardy; Major General Aminul Karim; Major General Waker-uz-Zaman

The 9th Infantry Division ("The Lightning Division") is a formation of the Bangladesh Army, based in Savar Cantonment, Savar, Dhaka. It is the first infantry division of the Bangladesh Army that was raised post-independence.

The division is considered the most strategic and important formation of the Bangladesh Army, as it is entrusted with the security of Dhaka, the capital of Bangladesh.

== History ==
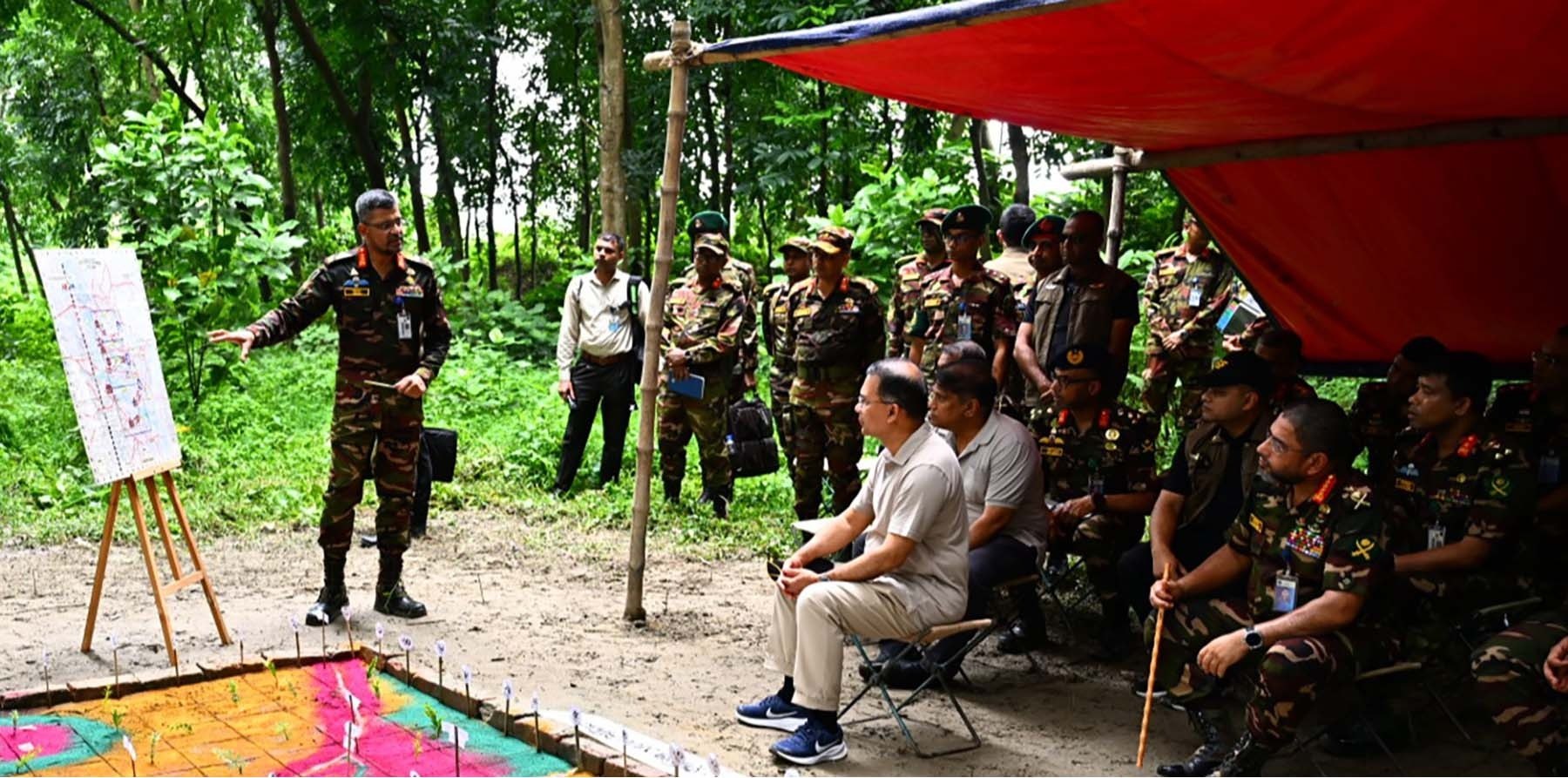
PM Tarique Rahman visiting the 9th Infantry Division summer exercise in 2026

9th Infantry Division was raised in November 1975 in Sher-e-Bangla Nagar as the first division of the Bangladesh Army. The division started under the command of Major General Mir Shawkat Ali, headquartered at Sher-e-Bangla Nagor in Dhaka. At first, the division had 77th Infantry Brigade, 81st Infantry Brigade and 29th East Bengal Regiment under its command. During this time, the 77th Infantry Brigade was made up of 9th East Bengal Regiment, 13th East Bengal Regiment and 28th East Bengal Regiment; and the 81st Infantry Brigade contained 8th East Bengal Regiment, 11th East Bengal Regiment and 27th East Bengal Regiment. The division completed its organizational structure with the induction of 9th Artillery Brigade on 22 March 1976.

On 31 May 1984, the divisional headquarters was permanently moved to Savar Cantonment. On 1 September 1984, 309th Infantry Brigade was raised under this division and 71st Infantry Brigade was added on 30 June 1992. At that time, Savar Cantonment, Ghatail Cantonment and Momenshahi Cantonment were under 9th Infantry Division but on 1 July 1992, the Ghatail and Momenshahi Cantonments, along with 309 Infantry Brigade and 77 Infantry Brigade, were transferred to the then newly formed 19th Infantry Division.

On 20 September 2013, 99th Composite Brigade was added to the division, made up of 58th East Bengal Regiment, 34th Bangladesh Infantry Regiment and 20th Engineering Construction Battalion to provide security and support during the construction of the Padma Bridge.

== Formation ==
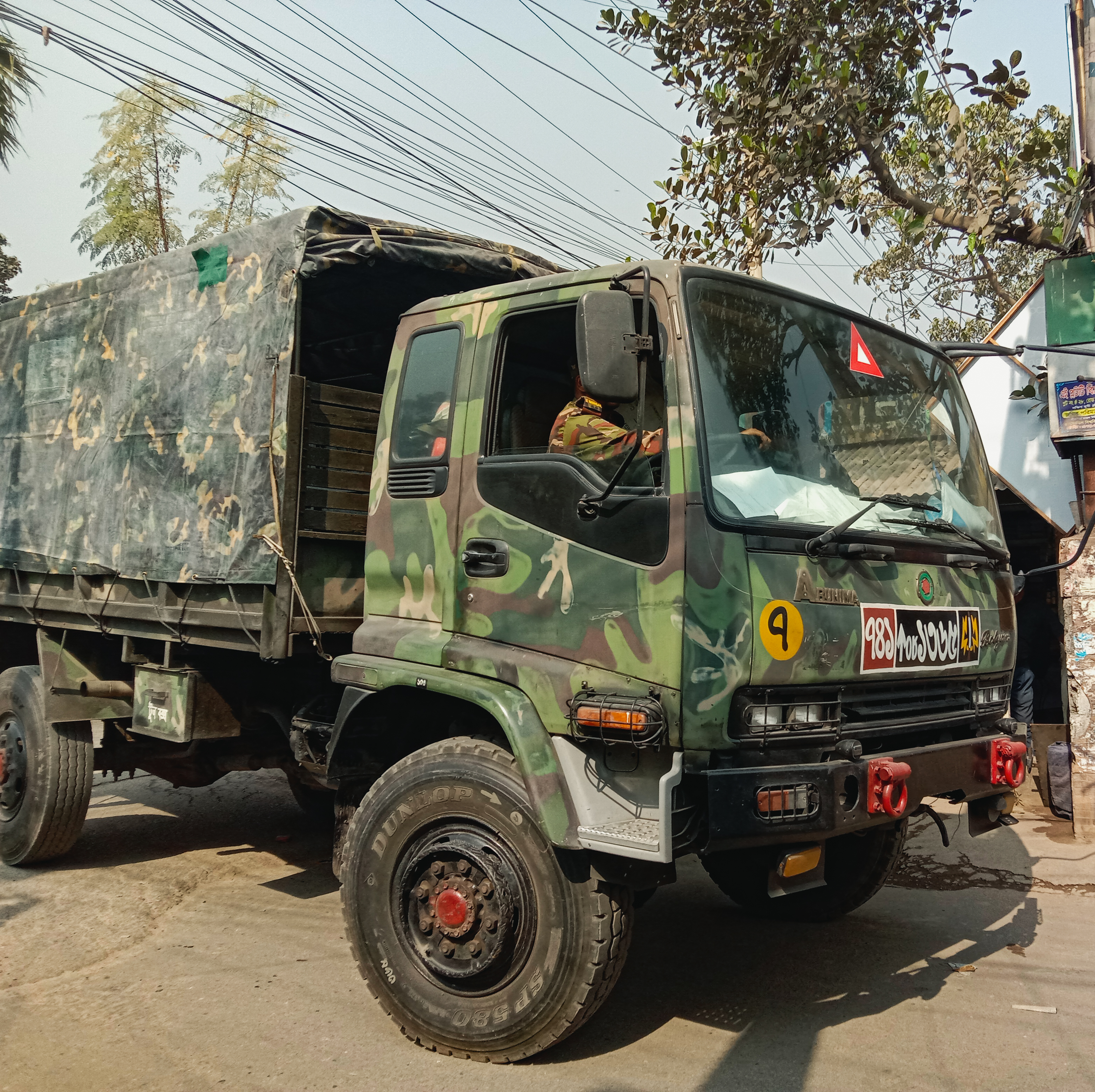
Bangladesh Army's Arunima Bolyan 4×4 truck of the 9th Infantry Division

Under the division, there is one infantry brigade, one mechanized brigade, one artillery brigade, and one composite brigade

Combat Arms

- Cavalry:
  - 12 Bengal Lancer Regiment
- Infantry:
  - 5 Bangladesh Infantry Regiment (Support Battalion)
  - 71 Mechanized Brigade
    - 11 Bangladesh Infantry Regiment (Mechanized)
    - 15 East Bangal Regiment (Mechanized)
    - 18 East Bangal Regiment (Mechanized)
  - 81 Infantry Brigade
    - 8 Bangladesh Infantry Regiment
    - 60 East Bengal Regiment
    - Infantry Battalion
  - 99 Composite Brigade (Padma Cantonment)
    - 58 East Bengal Regiment
    - 19 Bangladesh Infantry Regiment
    - Riverine Engineer Battalion
- Regiment of Artillery
  - 9 Artillery Brigade
    - 7 Field Regiment Artillery
    - 14 Field Regiment Artillery
    - 45 MLRS Regiment Artillery
    - 51 MLRS Regiment Artillery
    - 39 Division locating battery Artillery

Combat support

- Engineer
  - 8 Engineer Battalion
- Signals
  - 9 Signal Battalion
  - Static Signal Company

Service

- 36 Supply & Transport Battalion
- 11 Field Ambulance
- 501 Division Ordnance Company
- 9 Military Police Unit
- 9 Field Intelligence Unit
- EME Workshop, Savar
- Combined Military Hospital (CMH), Savar
- Military Dental Center, Savar
