= Combat Arms =

2008 video game

Combat Arms: Reloaded
- Developer: Nexon
- Publishers: Nexon, VALOFE
- Platform: Microsoft Windows
- Release: NA: July 11, 2008
- Genre: First-person shooter
- Mode: Multiplayer

Combat Arms: Reloaded & Combat Arms: Classic is a free-to-play multiplayer first-person shooter game developed by Nexon and published by VALOFE outside of Korea. In July 2012, Combat Arms was also released on Steam.

== Gameplay ==
Combat Arms gameplay is similar to commercial games such as Mission Against Terror, Crossfire, Counter-Strike, Ghost Recon 2 and Call of Duty. The game offers many different modes of play, including One Man Army, Elimination, Capture The Flag. During the 2009 winter season of the game, a special mode known as Snowball Fight was introduced, but was later removed. Combat Arms uses a player ranking system based on total experience, using common military ranks that players can obtain. Completing objectives, killing other players, and leveling up one's rank gives the player money in the form of Gear Points (GP), which can be used to purchase new equipment. Equipment includes weaponry, weapon attachments, and accessories for one's character. Players can also purchase equipment from the Black Market that is bought with real-world money. Primarily, the Black Market equipment is cosmetically different from regular shop items and have no rank or level requirement that many of the free items require. In addition, some items may only be obtained through the Black Market. Items purchased typically have an expiry date, after which the gear is deleted from the player's inventory, though some can be purchased permanently.

The game boasts customizability that includes female player models.

== Development ==
Combat Arms closed beta started on May 30, 2008, exclusively through FilePlanet and ran until June 6. This beta was limited to users from North America, South America, and Oceania. In the closed beta, 4 maps and 30 weapons were available. On June 26, Combat Arms went into its Pre-Open Beta Phase, whereby the game was open Combat Arms Europe Closed Beta testing. Closed Beta testing finished on November 11, 2008, and the Open Beta testing began on December 16, 2008 and lasted until January 15, 2009. The game is now fully released in Korea, North America, Australia, New Zealand and Europe. On April 2, 2009, Nexon America announced that South American service for Combat Arms would cease on April 9 of that year. Those who had any amount of NX were allowed to play until October 9, or until their NX fell below an undefined amount, whichever came first. An in-game voice chat system, provided by Vivox, was implemented in the game on November 25, 2009 and was removed on February 12, 2015. This voice feature later returned in the reloaded update.

On June 29, 2010, Level Up! Interactive, the premier Brazilian free games publisher announced that it had attained publishing rights of Combat Arms in Brazil. This was launched in September 2010.

In 2012, Combat Arms continued to receive updates on a regular basis. This includes the inclusion of new maps, new weaponry, and new character skins. There are currently 40 maps and 449 weapons available as of March 13, 2013.

In 2015, Nexon America and their sister company Nexon Europe S.A.R.L., announced a "transatlantic" merger of their North American and European servers, and while not allowing either group of players to play on their contemporaries servers, they can both play together on the "Global" server. Nexon America also gave Nexon Europe S.A.R.L. control of the entire game as Nexon America focuses on other games.

On November 22, 2017, Nexon officially ceased development and server operation for Combat Arms. As of that date, VALOFE Global took over development and server operation for the game.

== Critical reception ==
Metacritic aggregate reviews place Combat Arms with an average of 71. Reviewers cite many bugs and glitches in the earlier versions.

GameZone's Michael Splechta reviewed the game on March 11, 2010, saying "Combat Arms is fun. Simple as that. If you can overlook the annoying players, then anyone looking for a competitive online shooter should look no further. This is free to play Fun-FPS at its best."

Softwarelint's Chris-Erik Fotland reviewed the game on 17 Dec 2012, saying "For many – Combat arms is unknown, not made its successful way yet – But FPS action online couldn't be better than what Combat Arms has brought to the world of gaming! Best of all, its free!"
