= Guimara Cantonment =

Bangladeshi military base

- গুইমারা সেনানিবাস
- Guimara, Chittagong, Bangladesh

Site information
- Type: Military base

Guimara Cantonment (Note: Bengali: গুইমারা সেনানিবাস, romanized: gu'imārā sēnānibāsa) is a Bangladeshi military cantonment located in Chattogram Division, Bangladesh. The 24th Artillery Brigade is based at the cantonment.

== Installations ==
- 24th Artillery Brigade
- Combined Military Hospital, Guimara Cantt, Dighinala

== See also ==
- List of formations of the Bangladesh Army
