= Shahid Salahuddin Cantonment =

Bangladeshi military cantonment

Coordinates: 24.4817°N 89.9989°E

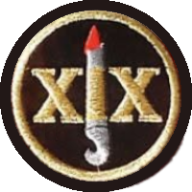
Shahid Salahuddin Cantonment
- Ghatail, Dhaka, Bangladesh

Site information
- Type: Cantonment
- Controlled by: Bangladesh Army

Garrison information
- Current commander: Major General Sayeed Anowar Mahmoodd

Shahid Salahuddin Cantonment (Note: Bengali: শহীদ সালাহউদ্দিন সেনানিবাস, romanized: Śahīda sālāha'uddina sēnānibāsa) is a cantonment located in Ghatail Upazila, Tangail District, Bangladesh. The cantonment is named in honour of Captain Salauddin Mumtaz who was killed during Battle of Kamalpur in the Bangladesh War of Independence. The headquarters of 19th Infantry Division is located here. The contemporary commander is major general Mohammed Hossain Al Morshed.

== History ==
On 9 November 2009, Chief Of General Staff (CGS) of Bangladesh Army witnessed first firing of recoilless rifle of Ghatail Field Firing Range. On 12 February 2014, two army soldiers and three soldiers of Border Guard Bangladesh died in a shell explosion at the firing range. On 28 August 2014, three children were injured at the range after a shell they were playing with exploded. Bangladesh and India held joint military exercise in counter terrorism and disaster management, at the cantonment from 5 November 2016 to 18 November 2016. Bangladesh Army Archery Competition in 2016 was held at the cantonment.

== Installations ==
- HQ 19th Infantry Division
  - Area Headquarter, Ghatail
  - Station Headquarters, Ghatail
    - Combined Military Hospital
    - Garrison Engineers (Army), Ghatail
    - OSP - 2
    - Static Signal Company, Ghatail
    - 37th ST Battalion, Ghatail
    - Station Supply Depot (SSD), Ghatail
  - 4th Horse Regiment
  - 19th Artillery Brigade
  - 309th Infantry Brigade
  - 25th Bangladesh Infantry Regiment
  - 26th Engineers Regiment
  - 32nd Signals Coy Company
  - 15th Field Ambulance
  - 88th Ordnance Depot
  - 76th EME Workshop
- Army School of Education and Administration (ASEA)
- Army Medical Corps Centre and School (AMCC&S)
- Cantonment Board, Ghatail
