= Alikadam Cantonment =

Cantonment of the Bangladesh Army

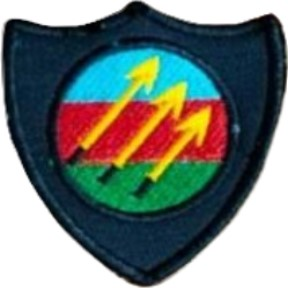
Alikadam Cantonment
- Alikadam, Chittagong, Bangladesh

Site information
- Type: Cantonment
- Controlled by: Bangladesh Army

Location
- Coordinates: 21.65°N 92.31°E

Garrison information
- Garrison: 97th Infantry Brigade

Alikadam Cantonment (Bengali: আলীকদম সেনানিবাস) is a cantonment of the Bangladesh Army located outside of Bandarban, Bangladesh. The 24th Infantry Division had jurdristriction over the cantonment under 69th Infantry Brigade. In 2015, the cantonment was shifted under jurdristriction of newly formed 10th Infantry Division headquartered at Ramu Cantonment with new 97th Infantry Brigade formed in here.

It is one of five cantonments in Chittagong Hill Tracts area.

== Educational institutions ==
- Alikadam Cantonment Public School and College

== See also ==
- Ramu Cantonment
