= A. K. M. Mustafa Kamal Pasha =

Major General of Bangladesh Army

Abul Kalam Mohammad Mustafa Kamal Pasha
- Born: 22 October 1963 (age 62); Kishoreganj, East Pakistan, Pakistan
- Military career
- Allegiance: Bangladesh
- Branch: Bangladesh Army
- Service years: 1985–2024
- Rank: Major General
- Unit: Army Medical Corps
- Commands: Director General of Directorate General Medical Service; Commandant of Armed Force Medical College; Inspector General of Bangladesh Jail; Director General of Central Medical Store Depot; Commandant of Armed Forces Medical Institute; Commandant of CMH, Bogra; Commandant of CMH, Ghatail
- Awards: Sena Parodorshita Padak (SPP)

A.K.M Mustafa Kamal Pasha is a retired major general of the Bangladesh Army. He served as the director general of Directorate General Medical Service.

== Early life ==
Pasha was born on 22 October 1963 in Kishoreganj District, East Pakistan, Pakistan. He did his MBBS from University of Dhaka. He has a Masters of Public Health from the National Institute of Preventive and Social Medicine. He is a graduate of National Defense College. He completed a master's degree from Bangladesh University of Professionals in strategy & development studies.

== Career ==
Pasha served in demining operations in Kuwait while on deputation to the Kuwait Army in 1994.

Pasha is a member of the syndicate committee of Bangladesh University of Professionals in 2018. He served as the commandant of Armed Forces Medical Institute. He had also served as the director of Central Medical Stores Depot.

From 2013 to 2015, Pasha served in the academic council member of Shaheed Ziaur Rahman Medical College and Islamic University, Bangladesh. He is a member of Climate Change and Health Promotion Unit under the Ministry of Health and Family Welfare.

Pasha was appointed inspector general of Bangladesh Jail on 28 November 2018. He replaced Brigadier General Syed Iftekhar Uddin. In September 2019, he reported that there were nine doctors and 132 vaccines in Bangladesh Prison system.

On 23 September 2020, Brigadier General Mominur Rahman Mamun was appointed inspector general of Bangladesh Jail replacing Pasha who was sent back to Armed Forces Division. On 18 October 2020, Pasha was made the commandant of Armed Forces Medical College. He was appointed as director general of DGMS in December 2023 and retired in October 2024.
