= Army Medical College (disambiguation) =

Army Medical College refers to the medical colleges in Bangladesh and Pakistan, run by the Bangladesh Army and Pakistan Army.

== Bangladesh ==
- Army Medical College, Bogra, Bangladesh
- Army Medical College, Chattogram, Bangladesh
- Army Medical College, Cumilla, Bangladesh
- Army Medical College, Jashore, Bangladesh
- Rangpur Army Medical College, Bangladesh

== Pakistan ==
- Army Medical College, Rawalpindi, Pakistan
