= Army Institute of Business Administration, Sylhet =

Army-run business school in Sylhet, Bangladesh

Coordinates: 24.8989°N 91.9457°E

Army Institute of Business Administration (Army IBA), Sylhet
- আর্মি ইনস্টিটিউট অব বিজনেস এডমিনিস্ট্রেশন (আর্মি আইবিএ), সিলেট
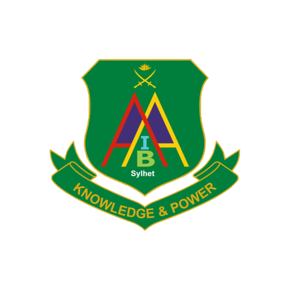
- Army Institute of Business Administration, Sylhet
- Other names: Army IBA, Sylhet
- Motto: Knowledge and Power
- Type: Public business school
- Established: 15 January 2015; 11 years ago
- Parent institution: Bangladesh Army
- Academic affiliations: Bangladesh University of Professionals
- Director: Brig Gen Md Abdul Hye (Retd)
- Location: Sylhet Cantonment Road, Sylhet, Bangladesh
- Website: www.aibasylhet.edu.bd

Army Institute of Business Administration (Army IBA), Sylhet, is a military business school run by the Bangladesh Army at Sylhet Cantonment Road, Sylhet. As the institute is affiliated with the Bangladesh University of Professionals (BUP), the academic curriculum is approved and regulated by the BUP academic council and the syndicate.

== History ==
Army Institute of Business Administration (Army IBA), Sylhet was established on 15 January 2015 at Jalalabad Cantonment, Sylhet. It is a higher education institution affiliated with the Bangladesh University of Professionals (BUP) and administered by the Bangladesh Army. Brigadier General Md. Zahirul Islam, NDC, PSC, G (Retd) was the founding director of the institute.

At the beginning, its temporary campus was located at Jalalabad Cantonment Public School and College, Sylhet. On 20 October 2025, the Chief of Army Staff of the Bangladesh Army, General Waker-Uz-Zaman, inaugurated the new permanent campus, which the institute describes as the largest IBA campus in Bangladesh.

== Location ==
The institute is located at Sylhet Cantonment Road, beside the Sylhet–Tamabil Highway. It was temporarily set up at the campus of Jalalabad Cantonment Public School and College (JCPSC) before moving to its permanent campus near Sylhet Cantonment Road, opposite the Sylhet BKSP.

== Administration ==
Army IBA, Sylhet is administered by the Bangladesh Army through Area Headquarters, Sylhet. The GOC and Area Commander of the Sylhet area is the Chief Patron of Army IBA, Sylhet. The institute is governed by an eighteen-member governing body consisting of representatives of the army, faculty members, administrative personnel, students, and parent representatives. The current director is Brigadier General Md Abdul Hye (Retd).

== Academic curriculum ==
The Bangladesh University of Professionals administers the academic curriculum in accordance with the rules of the University Grants Commission of Bangladesh. The current curriculum of Army IBA, Sylhet, consists of Bachelor of Business Administration (BBA) and Master of Business Administration (MBA) programs. Major areas of specialization include Operations Management, Accounting, Finance, Marketing, Management Information Systems, Human Resource Management, and Supply Chain Management. The current intake for BBA is two per year (Spring and Fall), and for MBA, one intake per year.

== See also ==
- Army Institute of Business Administration, Savar
- Bangladesh University of Professionals (BUP)
- Military Institute of Science and Technology (MIST)
- Armed Forces Medical College (AFMC)
