= Mahbubur Rahman (major general, born 1962) =

Bangladesh Army officer

- Education: Rajshahi Medical College
- Military career
- Allegiance: Bangladesh
- Branch: Bangladesh Army
- Service years: 1986–2023
- Rank: Major General
- Unit: Army Medical Corps
- Commands: Director General of Directorate General of Drug Administration; Commandant of Armed Forces Medical College; Commandant of CMH, Dhaka
- Awards: Sena Utokorsho Padak(SUP)

Mahbubur Rahman is a retired major general of the Bangladesh Army and the director general of the Directorate General of Medical Services. Prior to this appointment, he was DG of DGDA. Before that he was commandant of Armed Forces Medical College. He was the 13th colonel commandant of the Army Medical Corps.

== Early life ==
Rahman was born on 2 January 1962. He did his MBBS from the Rajshahi Medical College in 1985 and received his commission from Bangladesh Army next year.

== Career ==
Rahman was promoted to brigadier general rank in 2011 and was appointed head of the Army Medical Corps Center and School. He was the dean of the medical department at the Bangladesh University of Professionals. He also worked as the chief health officer of the Dhaka South City Corporation.

On 3 February 2019, Rahman was appointed the head of Armed Forces Medical College.

On 8 May 2019, Rahman was appointed the director general of the Directorate General of Drug Administration. He visited JMI Industrial Park of the JMI Group in November 2019. He approved COVID-19 vaccines bought from Serum Institute of India by BEXIMCO for usage during the COVID-19 pandemic in Bangladesh.

On 11 August 2021, Bangladesh High Court issued a contempt of court ruling against Rahman, Abul Bashar Mohammed Khurshid Alam who is the director general of Directorate General of Health Services, Babul Kumar Shaha who is the director general of Directorate of National Consumer Rights Protection, Lokman Hossain Miah who is the health secretary, and AFM Anwarul Haque who is the managing director of Indo-Bangla Pharmaceuticals Limited AFM Anwarul Haque for failing to stop the manufacturing of low quality antibiotics. He retired in January 2023.
