= Muhammad Mahbub-ul Alam =

Bangladeshi general

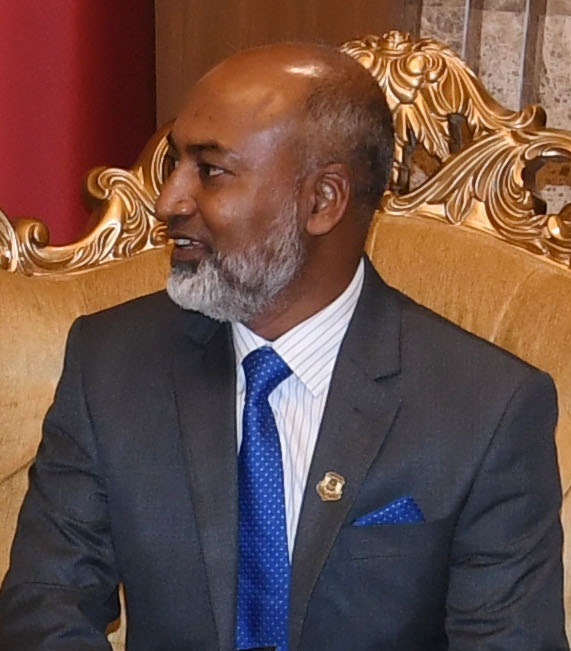
- Alam in 2025
- Born: 5 December 1970 (age 55); Shailkupa, East Pakistan, Pakistan
- Education: Jhenaidah Cadet College; Bangladesh Military Academy
- Military career
- Allegiance: Bangladesh
- Branch: Bangladesh Army; Border Guard Bangladesh
- Service years: 1990 – present
- Rank: Major General
- Unit: Bangladesh Infantry Regiment
- Commands: Vice Chancellor of Bangladesh University of Professionals; Additional Director General of Border Guard Bangladesh; Commander of 105th Infantry Brigade; CO of 12th Bangladesh Infantry Regiment
- Awards: Bishishto Seba Padak (BSP)
- Website: BUP VC

Muhammad Mahbub-ul Alam (Note: Bengali: মোঃ মাহবুব-উল আলম) (Note: BSP, ndc, afwc, psc, MPhil, PhD) is a major general of the Bangladesh Army and the incumbent vice chancellor of Bangladesh University of Professionals. Prior to Joining BUP, he served as Principal of Adamjee Cantonment College. Before that, he served as additional director general of Bangladesh Border Guard.

== Early life and education ==
Alam has an MPhil degree in strategy and development studies and a PhD degree on security and strategic studies from Bangladesh University of Professionals. His second master's is in defence studies from National University. He successfully completed National Defense Course and Armed Forces War Course from National Defence College. He finished his staff course from Defence Services Command and Staff College, Mirpur Cantonment, Dhaka. Moreover, he has completed Army Brigade Commanders' Course from International Military Education Exchange Centre (IMEEC) from Nanjing, China and got awarded with excellent student officer award for his outstanding performance. He has done Staff Officers' Logistic Orientation Course from Turkey as well.

General Mahbub is an ex-cadet of Jhenidah Cadet College, Jhenidah.

== Career ==
Alam was commissioned in the Corps of Infantry of the Bangladesh Army on 21 December 1990. He has received training in logistics orientation in Turkey and brigade commanders course in China. He was a founding member of Army Golf Club.

Alam served in Border Guard Bangladesh as additional director general. At the same time, he was brigadier general and in National Defence College as director while he was colonel. He also served as general staff officer in Army Headquarters. As commanding officer of an infantry battalion, he led "Operation Purba Prachir".

Alam is Board of Trustees of Bangladesh Army University of Engineering & Technology. He is a member of the governing body of the National Defence College. He was appointed vice chancellor of Bangladesh University of Professional. He planned to develop Bangladesh University of Professionals by focusing on needs-based education and outcome-based education.
