= Armed Forces Medical College (disambiguation) =

Armed Forces Medical College may refer to:

- Armed Forces Medical College (Bangladesh)
- Armed Forces Medical College (India)
