= A. K. M. Aminul Haque (general) =

Retired major general of Bangladesh Army

Abul Kashem Miah Aminul Haque
- আবুল কাশেম মিয়া আমিনুল হক
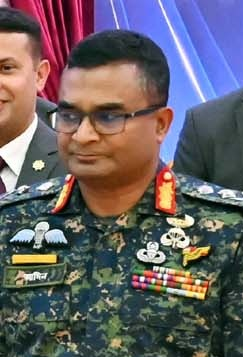
- Amin in 2024
- Born: 19 December 1968 (age 57); Bhedarganj, East Pakistan, Pakistan
- Education: Bangladesh University of Engineering and Technology; National University; Military Training: Bangladesh Military Academy; Defence Services Command and Staff College
- Military career
- Allegiance: Bangladesh
- Branch: Bangladesh Army; Bangladesh Ansar
- Service years: 1989–2025
- Rank: Major General
- Unit: Corps of Signals
- Commands: Senior Directing Staff (Army-1) of National Defence College; Director General of Bangladesh Ansar and Village Defence Party; Senior Directing Staff (Army-2) of National Defence College; Director (IT) of Army Headquarters; Commander of 86th Independent Signals Brigade

A.K.M Aminul Haque (born 19 December 1968) is a retired two star officer of the Bangladesh Army. He was appointed as ambassador at Ministry of Foreign Affairs. Once served as director general of the Bangladesh Ansar and Village Defence Party. He was the chairman of the Ansar-VDP Unnayan Bank.

Haque was the senior directing staff (Army-2) of the National Defence College. Prior to joining the National Defence College, he served as director of IT, Directorate at Bangladesh Army Headquarters and director of Trust Bank Limited.

== Early life and education ==
Haque was born in Bhedarganj Upazila, Shariatpur District. He completed his SSC and HSC from Cumilla Cadet College. He completed his undergraduate degree from the Bangladesh University of Engineering and Technology. He completed two master's degrees from the National University of Bangladesh and Bangladesh University of Professionals respectively. He received his PhD degree from the University of Dhaka in November 2022.

== Career ==
Haque was commissioned in the Bangladesh Army on 22 December 1989 with the 21st Bangladesh Military Academy (BMA) Long Course.

In September 2011, Lieutenant Colonel Haque was the additional director of National Security Intelligence when he led an operation arrest six individuals in Dhaka in connection with the leak of question papers for medical and dental school exams.

Haque served as defence adviser at the Bangladesh High Commission in London.

In January 2020, Haque came back to Bangladesh and joined senior directing staff -SDS (Army)-2 of the National Defence College in Mirpur Cantonment. Later, he served as director of IT at Army Headquarters until he got promoted to major general. On 17 January 2023, he was appointed the director general of Bangladesh Ansar and Village Defence Party. He went to the shrine of Sheikh Mujibur Rahman to pay tribute after his promotion.

== Personal life ==
Haque's brother AKM Enamul Haque Shamim was an Awami League member of parliament, and a deputy minister in Sheikh Hasina's cabinet. There was an attempted assassination of his brother, Enamul Haque Shamim, in June 2014 while he was serving as director of the National Security Intelligence. His father engineer Abul Hashem is a veteran of the Bangladesh Liberation War and former employee of the Bangladesh Water Development Board. His mother Ratnagarva Begum Ashrafunnesa also actively participated in the Bangladesh Liberation War with her husband.
