= Jhenaidah Cadet College =

Military high school in Bangladesh

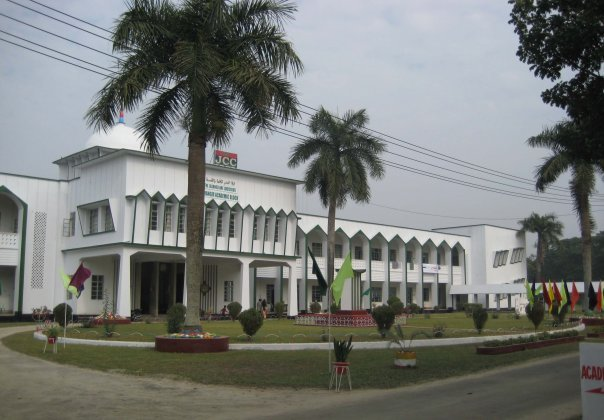
- Picture of Jhenaidah Cadet College

Location
- 2 km north of Jhenaidah town Jhenaidah-highway junction Bangladesh; Jhenaidah, Bangladesh, 7301; 23.5669°N 89.1776°E

Information
- Motto: The Learned Are Judicious (বাংলা: সুশিক্ষিত জন্যই সুবিবেচিত)
- Established: October 18, 1963; 62 years ago
- School board: Board of Intermediate and Secondary Education, Jessore
- Principal: Md. Monirul Islam
- Adjutant: Major Sarfaraz Nawaz PSC
- Language: English
- Area: 103 acres (420,000 m^{2})
- Color: Green
- Demonym: JCCian
- First Principal: N D Hasan
- EIIN: 132184
- Website: jcc.army.mil.bd

Jhenaidah Cadet College (JCC) is an English version military boarding school located in the outskirts of Jhenidah in Bangladesh. It is one of twelve cadet colleges of Bangladesh. It has departments of Science and Humanities.

== Overview ==
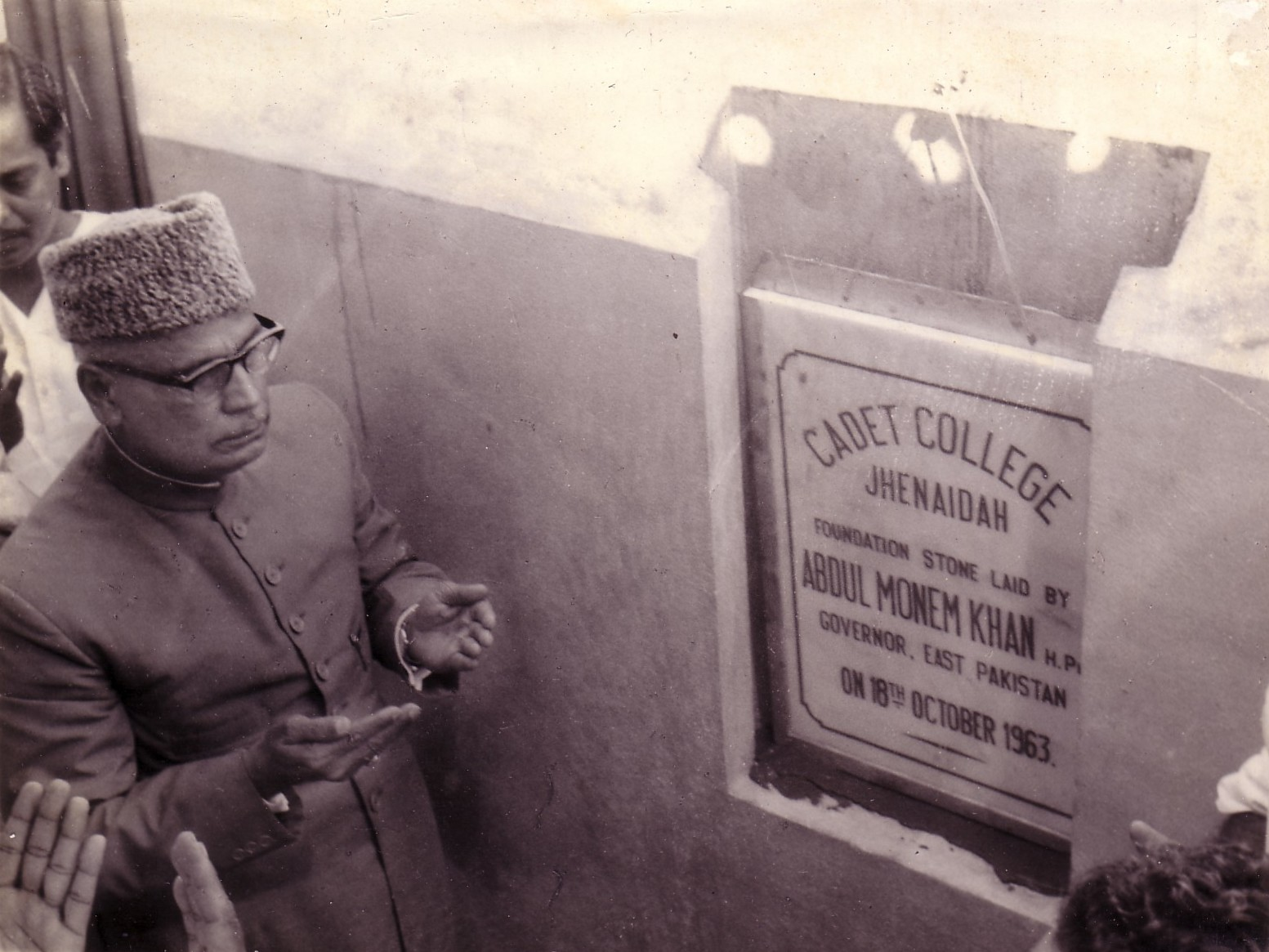
East Pakistan Governor Abdul Monem Khan laying the foundation stone of the college in 1963.

Jhenidah Cadet College is one of the twelve specialized residential public schools of the country. The college was established on 18 October 1963, with the first intake in 1964. It is the second among all cadet colleges in terms of seniority. It is located by the side of Jhenidah-Kushtia Highway, two kilometers away to the north of Jhenaidah town. The campus has an area of 103 acres (42 hectare).

== Motto, colors and flag ==
Its motto is "The Learned are Judicious," which comes from the Arabic text inscribed at the middle of the college color, the flag is bottle green. The college flag has the three colors of the Armed Forces and bottle green as the background.

== Houses ==
There are two storied three houses for the Cadets' accommodation. These houses are named after three historic battles of Islam during the era of Muhammad. Cadets are also identified with their respective houses during their staying in JCC. Besides that, all the competitions of this institution are mainly house based. To create the competitive spirit amongst the cadets, the houses play a vital role. Cadets also put their best efforts to uphold the image and name of their houses. According to seniority of establishment, the houses are:

- Badr House:
  - House Color: "Green",
  - House Motto: "Ever Radiant in Deed".
  - Most senior House.
- Khaiber House:
  - House Color: "Blue",
  - House motto: "Austere Devotion to Work"
- Hunain House:
  - House Color: "Red",
  - House Motto: "Concentration in Meditation"

== Admission ==
Students are admitted in class VII (7th Grade) at the ages 11 to 13 years 6 month. The selection process is rigorous, with a written exam, viva and medical tests. The selected top 50 students will study till class XII (Higher Secondary).

Cadet college is a fully residential school. Cadets get four vacations of total 90 days in a year called term break.

== College uniform ==
All students (cadets) wear a uniform similar to cadet officers in a military academy in academic hours, shorts sleeves in afternoon games and sports, and long sleeves with tie during evening prep and dinner. There are some variations in the uniform worn by cadets in authority.

Members of the teaching staff wear a form of school dress with tie when teaching.

== Infrastructure ==
There is a large academic building where the cadets do their classes and study during prep time. meals are served daily, and five times in the college dining hall which has a capacity of 300-400 individuals. Usually cadets pray their Magrib and Jumma prayers in the college mosque. All officials of the college live in the college premises. The principal has a two storied house, while the vice principal, adjutant, medical officer, teachers all have a villa each.

For sports, there are five basketball, seven volleyball, five football, two cricket, one hockey, one tennis, one swimming poll, one squash quart and an athletics ground. The playground is a grassy area in the center of the college. Playing any of the above games is compulsory in the afternoon.

There is a dairy firm to serve pure dairy product for the cadets. A hospital, bank, post office, barber, tailor shop, a workshop serve the utilities of the cadets. Cadets have a mandatory medical checkup at the start and end of every term. Cadets have an auditorium for cultural purposes, and a library; in addition, the cadet have language club, computer lab and multimedia classes.

== Administration and prefects ==
- Principal: Md. Monirul Islam
- Adjutant: Maj Sharfaraz Newaz, psc, G
- Medical Officer: Maj Md Rafid Karim
- Accounts Officer: Mohammad Mizanur Rahman
- College Prefect: Cadet Hossen
- College Cultural Prefect: Cadet Raid
- College Dining Hall and Mosque Prefect: Cadet Fahim
- College Games Prefect: Cadet Rakin
- House Prefect of Badr House: Cadet Labib
- House Prefect of Khaiber House: Cadet Ragib
- House Prefect of Hunain House: Cadet Tawsif

== Clubs and societies ==
- Bangla Debate Club
- English Debate Club
- GK and Current Affairs Club
- Quranic Society
- Computer Programming and Robotics Club
- Bangla Literary and Cultural Society
- English Society
- Geography Society
- Hiking Club
- Photography Club
- Biology Club
- Natural Study Club
- Physics Club
- Chemistry Club
- Math Olympiad Society

== Academic system ==
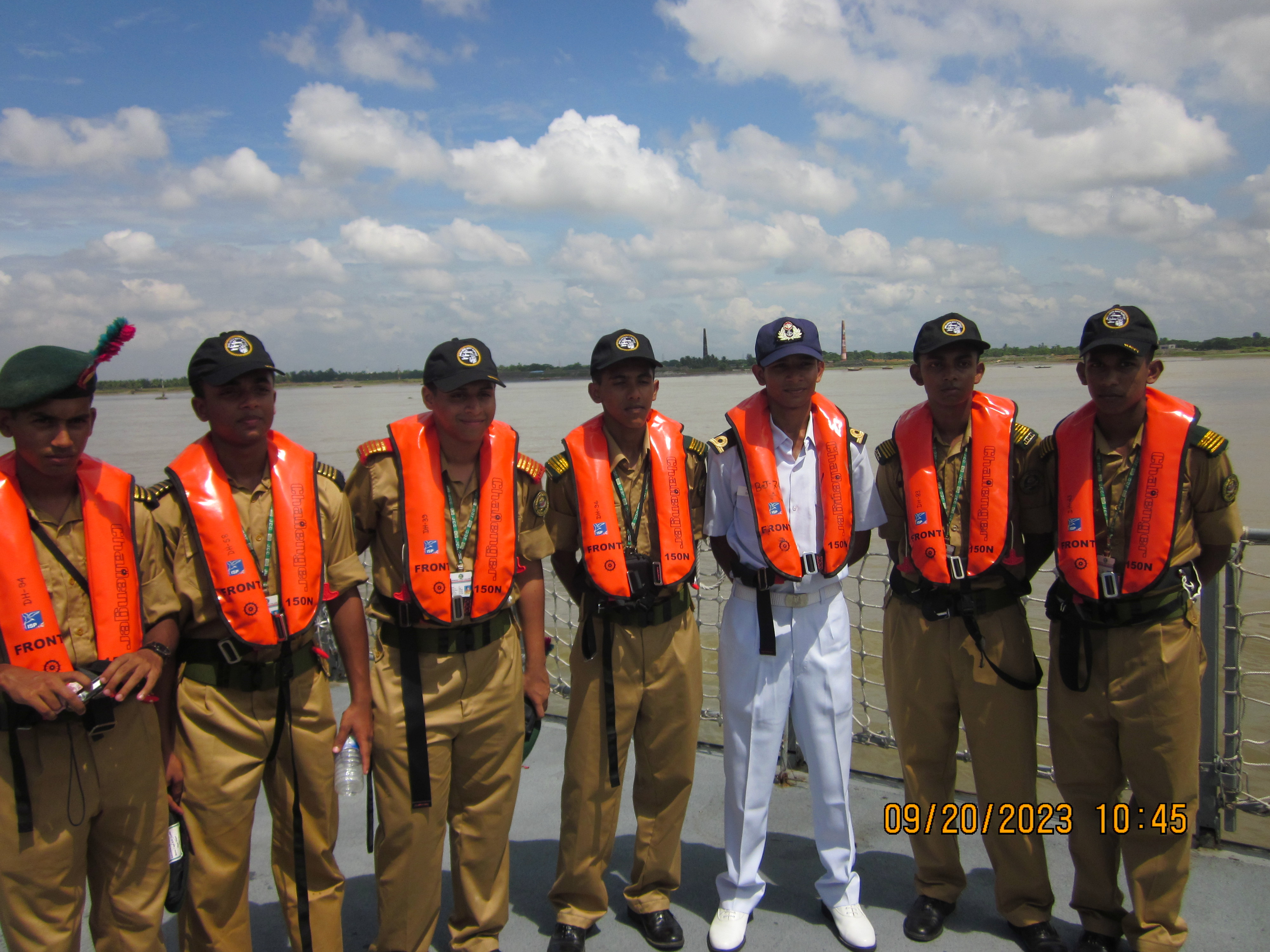
Cadets of Class XI on study tour

Cadets are enrolled in the seventh grade. They continue their study for six years. The Higher Secondary Certificate (HSC) is the final examination to pass. Each class generally has nearly fifty or more cadets divided in two sections.

The Secondary School Certificate (SSC) and the Higher Secondary Certificate (HSC) examinations are administered under direct control of the National Board of Education of Bangladesh. A calendar year is divided into three terms. The annual parade, physical training (PT), games and sports and cultural shows are a part of the academic system, and every cadet takes part in them. From 2003 all the cadet colleges were converted to the English version of the National curriculum. Cadets are taken on study tours every year.

== Sports and physical activities ==
Students participate in basketball, volleyball, soccer, tennis, cricket, squash, swimming, and athletics. They also participate in annual events like cross country marathon and obstacle courses.

== Cultural activities ==
Students participate in rhetoric competitions like extempore speech, debate, music, poetry recitation, current affairs display, wall magazines publications for special days and cultural events like music and drama. The school's debate team competes with graduate and post-graduate level schools in National Television Debates.

== Notable alumni ==
- General SM Shafiuddin Ahmed, 17th Chief of Army Staff of Bangladesh Army
- Shahidul Alam, photographer.
- Shah M. Faruque, Molecular Biologist at ICDDR,B
- Lieutenant General A. T. M. Zahirul Alam, Lt General and Force Commander of United Nations Mission in Liberia (UNMIL)
- Iqbal Quadir, founder, Grameen Phone, Professor, Massachusetts Institute of Technology
- Tauquir Ahmed, Actor and National Award winner film director
- Tawfique Hasan, Professor of Nanomaterials at the University of Cambridge
- Mamun Hossain: Writer of short stories and fictions, Winner of Bangla Academy Award in fiction in 2018
- Lieutenant General Md Mahfuzur Rahman, PSO of the Armed Forces Division, Bangladesh Army
- Lieutenant General Md Saiful Alam, Quartermaster General of the Bangladesh Army
- Lieutenant General Md. Mainur Rahman, GOC of Army Training and Doctrine Command
- Major General Mahbub-ul Alam, Vice Chancellor (VC) of Bangladesh University of Professionals (BUP)
- Major General S M Zia-Ul-Azim, Chairman of the Bangladesh Rural Electrification Board (BREB)
- Aninda Islam Amit, State Minister, Government of Bangladesh.
