= Quazi Rashid-Un-Nabi =

Bangladeshi General

- কাজী রশীদ-উন-নবী
- Born: Quazi Muhammad Rashid-Un-Nabi
- Education: Sher-e-Bangla Medical College
- Military career
- Allegiance: Bangladesh
- Branch: Bangladesh Army
- Service years: 1990 – present
- Rank: Major General
- Unit: Bangladesh Army Medical Corps
- Commands: Director General of Directorate General of Drug Administration; Commandant of Armed Forces Medical College; Director of Mitford Hospital, Dhaka

Quazi Muhammad Rashid-Un-Nabi is a major general of the Bangladesh Army and director general of the Directorate General of Medical Services. He served as the director general of the Directorate General of Drug Administration.

== Career ==
Quazi Md Rashid-Un-Nabi was commandant of the Armed Forces Medical College and director of Sir Salimullah Medical College, Mitford Hospital.

From 11 July 2024, he is serving as the director general of the Directorate General of Drug Administration.
