= AFMC (disambiguation) =

AFMC may refer to:

- Air Force Materiel Command, a major command of the U.S. Air Force
- Armed Forces Medical College (Bangladesh), Dhaka, Bangladesh
- Armed Forces Medical College, Pune, India
