= Mohammed Moshfequr Rahman =

Retired Major General of Bangladesh Army

- মো মোশফেকুর রহমান
- Alma mater: Bangladesh University of Professionals; National University; University of Madras
- Military career
- Allegiance: Bangladesh
- Branch: Bangladesh Army
- Service years: 1986 – 2023
- Rank: Major General
- Service number: BA - 3115
- Unit: Bangladesh Infantry Regiment
- Commands: Commandant of Bangladesh Infantry Regimental Centre; GOC of 11th Infantry Division; Director General of Directorate General of Defence Purchase; Area Commander of Logistics Area; Vice Chancellor of Bangladesh University of Professionals; Adjutant General at Army Headquarters
- Awards: Sena Gourab Padak(SGP); Sena Utokorsho Padak(SUP)

Mohammed Moshfequr Rahman is a retired two star officer of the Bangladesh Army who served as the adjutant general at Army Headquarters. Prior to join AG Branch, He was vice chancellor of Bangladesh University of Professional. He was the vice chairman of Trust Bank Limited and Astha Life Insurance Company Limited. After retirement, he joined National Defense College as SDS (adjunct) in January 2025.

== Education ==
Rahman has three masters from the Bangladesh University of Professionals, the National University, Bangladesh, and the University of Madras. He also attended Banani Bidyaniketan School and College.

== Career ==
Rahman had served as an instructor in the School of Infantry and Tactics, National Defence College, and Defence Services Command and Staff College. He had also been the commandant of the Bangladesh Infantry Regimental Center.

Rahman had served as the general officer commanding of the 11th infantry division. In 2017, he reviewed Sampriti joint military exercise between Bangladesh and India. Bangladesh Army's 38th East Bengal Regiment and IV Corps of India participated in the exercise held in Counter-Insurgency and Jungle Warfare School, Mizoram. He had also been the director general of the Directorate General of Defence Purchase.

Rahman had served as the logistics area commander in 2020. He was also the chief patron of the Dhaka Cantonment Girls' Public School and College. He oversaw Siraj-Khaleda Memorial Cantonment Board General Hospital and received ambulances from Summit Group for the hospital. On 28 December 2020, Rahman was appointed the vice-chancellor of Bangladesh University of Professionals. He is a member of the governing body of the National Defence College. He was the president of Army Golf Club. He was also the chairperson of Bangladesh Golf Academy.
