= Md. Jahangir Kabir Talukder =

Bangladeshi military personnel and diplomat

Md. Jahangir Kabir Talukder is a retired major general and former ambassador of Bangladesh to Kenya. He was the general officer commanding of the 24th Infantry Division, based in Chittagong Cantonment, and Chittagong area. He was the president of Bhatiary Golf and Country Club. He was the commandant of Bangladesh Military Academy. He is a former director of operations of Bangladesh Rifles.

== Early life ==
Talukder did his BSc at the University of Chittagong. He has a master's in defence studies from the National University, Bangladesh.

== Career ==
Talukder received his commission in Bangladesh Army on 21 December 1984 in the infantry corp.

In 2009, Talukder was the director (operations) of Bangladesh Rifles after the Bangladesh Rifles mutiny. He was responsible for tracking down mutineers.

Talukder was the commandant of Bangladesh Military Academy. He received Prime Minister Sheikh Hasina for the 75th BMA Long Course at Bangladesh Military Academy.

Talukder was the director general (operations and plan) at the Armed Forces Division in the Prime Minister's Office. He was the general officer commanding of the 24th Infantry Division.

In July 2019, Talukder was appointed the high commissioner of Bangladesh to Kenya.

After the fall of the Sheikh Hasina led Awami League government, Talukder was made a member of an investigation committee into the Bangladesh Rifles mutiny led by Major General ALM Fazlur Rahman. He is the vice-president of Old Rajshahi Cadets Association and donated protestors injured in protests against Shiekh Hasina on behalf on the foundation.
