= Wahid-Uz-Zaman =

Bangladeshi retired major general

Md Wahid-Uz-Zaman
- Military career
- Allegiance: Bangladesh
- Branch: Bangladesh Army
- Service years: 1985–2021
- Rank: Major General
- Unit: Corps of Engineers
- Commands: Commandant of Military Institute of Science and Technology; Director General of Bangladesh Telecommunication Regulatory Commission; Commander of 14th Independent Engineers Brigade; Commander of 34th Engineers Construction Brigade
- Awards: Bishishto Seba Padak (BSP)

Md Wahid-Uz-Zaman BSP, ndc, aowc, psc, te is a retired major general of the Bangladesh Army who served as the commandant of the Military Institute of Science and Technology.

== Career ==
Wahid-Uz-Zaman was the director general of Bangladesh Telecommunication Regulatory Commission in 2015.

Wahid-Uz-Zaman is a member of the board of Trustee of Bangladesh Army University of Engineering & Technology. He was a member of the Senate Committee of Bangladesh University of Professionals.

On 26 October 2021, Wahid-Uz-Zaman was appointed director general of Department of Immigration and Passports. But on next day Ministry of Public administration cancel the appointment and issued a gazette notification where it reinstate Major General Mohammad Ayub Chowdhury to his position and bring back Wahid-Uz-Zaman to armed forces.
