= Bhatiari =

Coordinates: 22°25′41″N 91°45′02″E

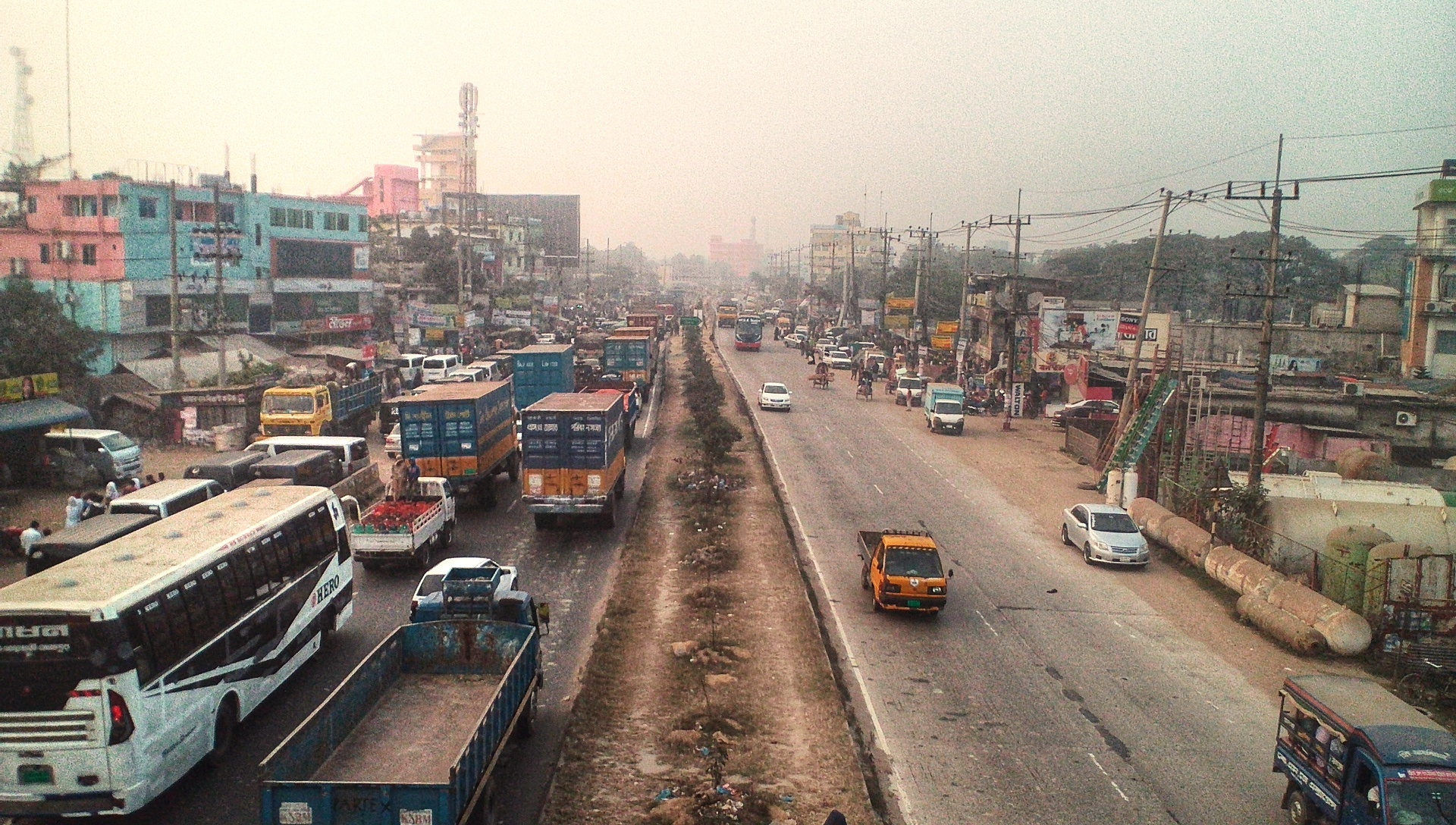
Bhatiari Area in evening

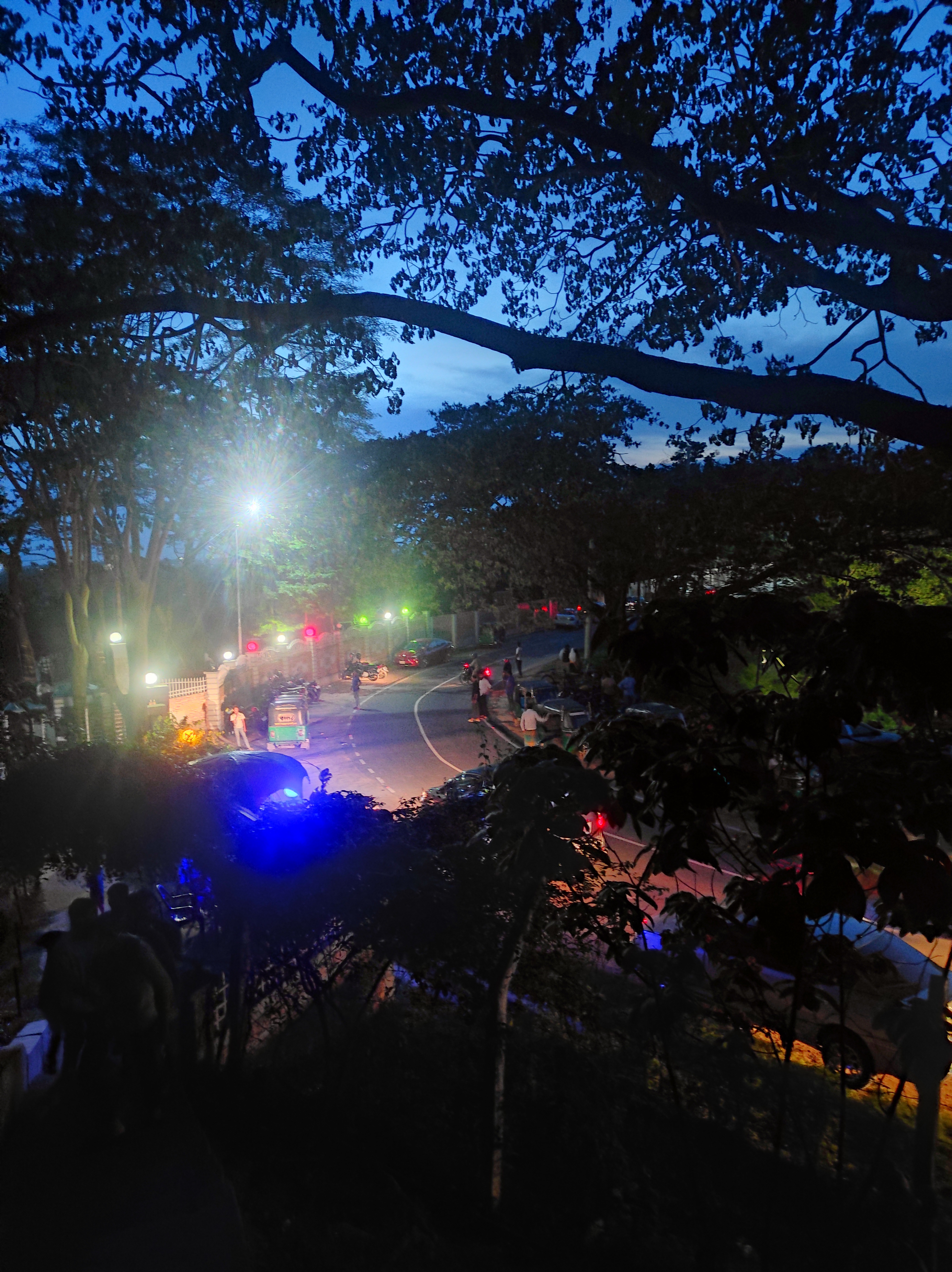
Sunset point

Bhatiari is a place situated at Bhatiari Union in Sitakunda, Chattogram. It is a famous tourist spot in Chittagong. The place is surrounded by several lakes and hills. The hilly area in Bhatiary is under control of Bangladesh Army

== Natural environment ==
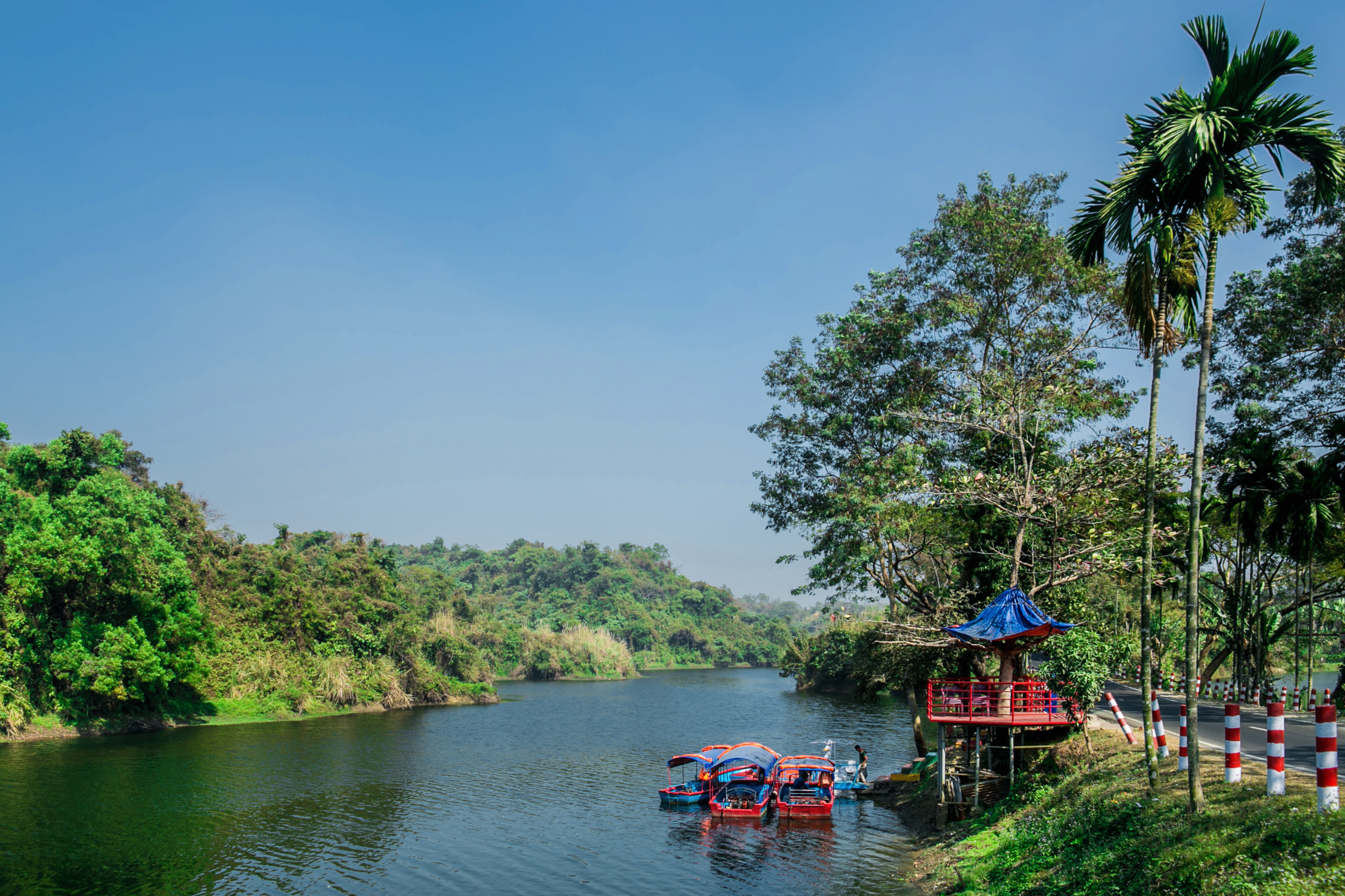
Boat Riding Point, Bhatiari Lake

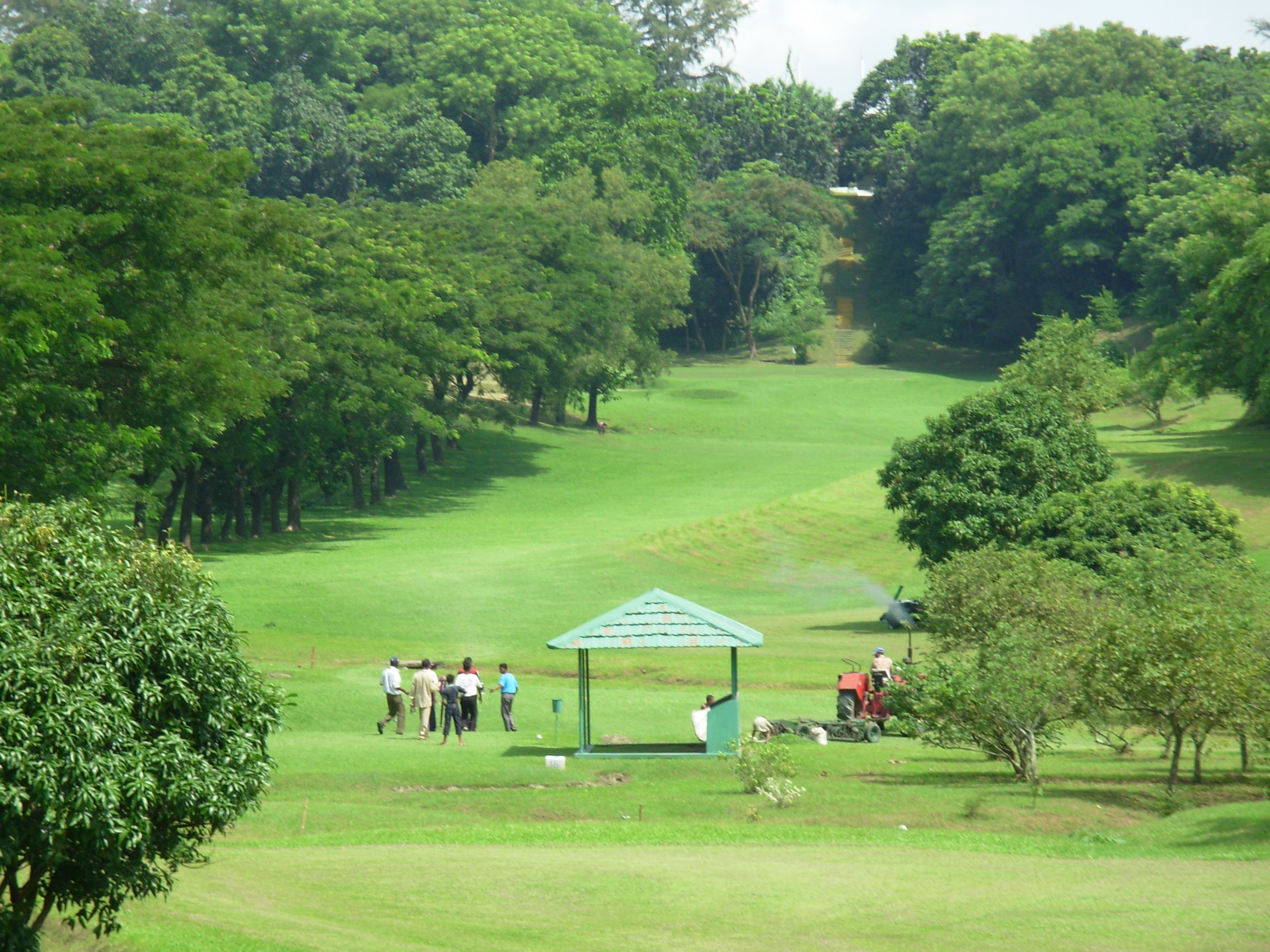
Bhatiary Golf and Country Club

Bhatiari is known for its natural environment. The main tourism spot of Bhatiary is the hills. People gather here in the afternoon to see the sunset from the top of the hill. The Hathazari-Bhatiary link road connects Bhatiary to Rangamati or Khagrachari. This road is maintained by Bangladesh Army. There is also a golf club in Bhatiray area which is also a tourist attraction.

== List of institutions ==
=== Military academy ===
The only one military academy of Bangladesh is situated in Bhatiry.

- Bangladesh Military Academy

=== College ===
- Bijoy Smarani University College

=== School ===
- Bhatiari Hazi T.S.C. High School
