= Syed Muhammad Motahar Hussain =

Syed Muhammad Motahar Hussain is a brigadier general of the Bangladesh Army and the inspector general of prisons of the Bangladesh Jail, overseeing all prisons in Bangladesh. He is the former director general of Bangladesh Krira Shikkha Protishtan.

Hussain was appointed head of Bangladesh Jail on 11 August 2024 after the fall of the Sheikh Hasina led Awami League government. He was the Director General of the Bangladesh Krira Shikkha Protishtan. During the movement against Sheikh Hasina, 11 prisons under the Bangladesh Jail were attacked, and about 2000 prisoners escaped. He had the important role of restoring order across the prison system of Bangladesh. Several high-profile militants and criminals were subsequently released on bail. Numerous former Ministers and members of parliament affiliated with the Awami League were detained and sent to jail.
