= Bangladesh Prisons =

Bangladeshi law enforcement agency

Bangladesh Jail
- Formation: 1973; 53 years ago
- Headquarters: Dhaka, Bangladesh
- Region served: Bangladesh
- Official language: Bengali
- IG Prison: Brigadier General Md Anwarul Kabir
- Parent organization: Ministry of Home Affairs
- Website: prison.gov.bd

Bangladesh Jail is a law enforcement agency responsible for the management and security of jails in Bangladesh and is headquartered in Dhaka, Bangladesh. Inspector General of Prison Brigadier General Mohammad Md Anwarul Kabir is head of the force.

The Bangladesh Jail manages 13 central jails and 55 district jails. The Department of Prison operates seven divisional prison and 68 prisons. Bangladesh Jail is under the Department of Prison which is under the Ministry of Home Affairs.

== History ==
Bangladesh Jail traces its origins to a Criminal Ward established in 1788 by the East India Company. The company passed the Bengal Regulation III of 1818 for preventive detention. The company built more prisons in 1986 in Comilla, Dhaka, Jessore, and Rajshahi. The British Raj declared jail in Dhaka and Rajshahi to be the Dhaka Central Jail and Rajshahi Central Jail.

Bangladesh jail was established in 1971, after the Independence of Bangladesh. They operate 13 central jails and 55 districts jails in Bangladesh.

On 4 December 1975, four senior leaders of the Awami League were murdered in Dhaka Central Jail. The four were former President Syed Nazrul Islam, former prime ministers Tajuddin Ahmed and Muhammad Mansur Ali, and President of Awami League Abul Hasnat Muhammad Qamaruzzaman. On 4 November 1975, jailer Aminur Rahman took the four from their separate rooms and placed them in one room. Aminur told them an important representative of the Khondaker Mostaq Ahmad government would meet them. Five Army officers led by Moslemuddin were refused entry to the jail by the Deputy inspector general of prisons but were eventually allowed following the orders of President Khondaker Mostaq Ahmad. The army personnel marched into the jail and shot the four leaders in their jail cell killing all except Muhammad Mansur Ali. After hearing the groans and Muhammad Mansur Ali call for water one of the prison guards, Motaleb, went and informed the army team who had returned to the entrance of the jail. The team returned and bayoneted all four Awami League leaders in their jail cells. It is observed as Jail Killing Day in Bangladesh.

== Inspector generals of jail ==
Name	Term start	Term end	Reference
Amir Hossain Khan	1947	1957	
Md. Nasim Uddin Sarkar	1957	1968	
A Obaidullah	1969	1972	
ATM Nuruzzaman	1973	1977	
Brigadier General AFM Abdul Haque	1977	1982	
Colonel Moksul Hossain Chowdhury	1982	1987	
Colonel Md. Mujibur Rahman	1987	1989	
Colonel Abdul Matin	1989	1991	
Colonel Md Iskandar Hossain	1991	1992	
Brigadier General Md. Abul Hossain	1992	1996	
Brigadier General Md Waliur Rahman Chowdhury	1997	2001	
Md. Liaquat Ali Khan	10 May 2001	19 November 2011	
Brigadier General Md. Zillur Rahman	2002	2004	
Brigadier General Md Taufiqul Alam	2004	2005	
Brigadier General Md. Zakir Hasan	2005	2009	
Brigadier General AHM Moqbul Hossain	19 February 2009	28 July 2009	
Brigadier General Md. Ashraful Islam Khan	2009	2013	
Brigadier General Syed Iftekhar Uddin	18 December 2013	10 December 2018	
Brigadier General AKM Mustafa Kamal Pasha	11 December 2018	8 October 2020	
Brigadier General Md. Mominur Rahman Mamun	8 October 2020	12 October 2021	
Brigadier General ASM Anisul Haque	12 October 2021	11 August 2024	
Brigadier General Syed Muhammad Motahar Hussain	11 August 2024	Incumbent	

== Special units ==
The Bangladesh jail has specialized units, they are:

- Prisons intelligence Unit
- Prisons Training Institute, Dhaka
- Prisons I.C.T unit
- Kara Academy, Rajshahi
