= Army Medical College, Chattogram =

Bangladesh Army controlled private medical college

Coordinates: 22.4023°N 91.8064°E

- আর্মি মেডিকেল কলেজ, চট্টগ্রাম
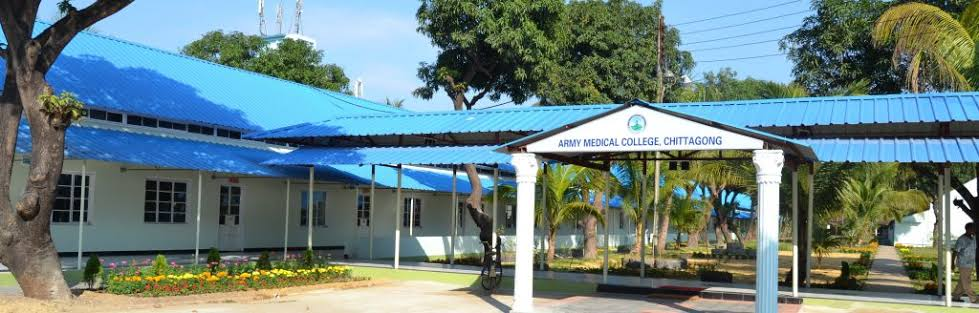
- Temporary campus of Army Medical College Chattogram
- Other name: AMCC
- Motto: Learn To Serve
- Type: Military medical college
- Established: 2014
- Academic affiliations: Bangladesh University of Professionals
- Principal: Col Sohel Ahmed, FCPS MBBS, MPhil
- Director: Maj Gen Mir Mushfiqur Rahman, BSP, SUP, ndc, psc, GOC 24 Infantry Division & Area Commander, Chattogram Area and Chairman, Governing Body AMCC.
- Academic staff: 70
- Administrative staff: 70
- Students: 300
- Location: Chattogram Cantonment, Bangladesh
- Campus: AMCC
- Language: English
- Website: www.amcc.edu.bd

Army Medical College, Chattogram (AMCC) is a military medical college, established in 2014. It is located in Chattogram Cantonment, Bangladesh. It is affiliated with Bangladesh University of Professionals. The college started its academic journey on 10 January 2015 with 50 students and 13 faculty members.

It offers a five-year course of study leading to a Bachelor of Medicine, Bachelor of Surgery (MBBS) degree. A one-year internship after graduation is compulsory for all graduates. The degree is recognised by the Bangladesh Medical and Dental Council.

Currently it has 11 batches with 50 students per batch.

Every year only 50 students gain admission to this college.

== Controlling authority ==
The controlling authority of Army Medical College Chattogram is shown below:

1. Ministry of Defence (Bangladesh)
2. Army Headquarters
3. Bangladesh University of Professionals(BUP)
4. Bangladesh Medical and Dental Council(BM&DC)

== Campus ==
Location for Permanent College Campus has been selected near Military Farm. It has no permanent campus yet. It has four lecture galleries equipped with modern teaching aids (of which three lecture halls are air-conditioned). It has a dissection hall with attached preservation room, has a histology room and a museum for the department of Anatomy. It also has well furnished laboratories for all other pre-clinical & para-clinical departments. Every department has its own tutorial room. It has enough histology slides, cadavers, viscera and models in the department of Anatomy. Ward placement for the clinical years is held in Chittagong CMH. Medicine & Surgery wards of Chittagong CMH are now affiliated by BCPS and affiliation of BCPS for Gynae & Obstetrics ward, Eye & ENT ward are under process. Autopsy classes are held in Chittagong Medical College under special considerations.

== Appearance in professional examinations ==
First batch of this institution appeared 1st professional MBBS examination held in May 2016. They achieved tremendous success. They secured three places - 1st (Shakib Bin Mohiuddin), 2nd (Fahmida Ferdous) and 9th (Mishkat Misho).

== Games and sports ==
Facilities for following games and sports are available:

(1) Football

(2) Volleyball

(3) Badminton

(4) Table tennis

(5) Cricket

(6) Chess

== Dormitory facilities ==
Army Medical College Chattogram is a residential institution.
