= Directorate General of Medical Services =

Government office

- Formation: 1971
- Headquarters: Dhaka, Bangladesh
- Location: Shaheed Sharani, Army Headquarters, Dhaka Cantonment
- Region served: Bangladesh
- Official language: Bengali
- Director General: Major General Quazi Rashid-Un-Nabi
- ADGMS: Lieutenant Colonel Shafiqul Hasan, FCPS
- Parent organization: Bangladesh Armed Forces
- Affiliations: Combined Military Hospital (Dhaka)
- Website: dgmsbd.net

Directorate General of Medical Services (Bengali: সামরিক চিকিৎসা সার্ভিস মহাপরিদপ্তর) is a Bangladesh government body under the Ministry of Defence responsible for overseeing the medical services of the Bangladesh Armed Forces. It is one of seven departments under the Ministry of Defence. The Directorate General of Medical Services provides grading and classification of plans and policies for overall health and medical care for the Armed Forces, annual planning, procurement and control of medical stores and equipment, advanced training of AMC, ADC and AFNS officers at home and abroad and expert pool control.

Directorate General of Medical Service regulate the Inter-military medical units such as the Armed Forces Medical Institute, the Armed Forces Institute of Pathology (AFIP), the Armed Forces Medical Stores Depot (AFMSD) and the Armed Forces Food and Drug Enforcement. Directorate General of Medical Service, is the highest policy making organization of Army Medical Corps, Army Dental Corps and Armed Forces Nursing Services. This Directorate General is also responsible for providing medical service to both serving and retired armed forces personnel, entitled civilian and their families. This office is also responsible for preparing and distributing budget to all armed forces medical units. During any disaster or natural calamity, this office plays vital role by providing medical support to the distressed. Major General Quazi Rashid-Un-Nabi is the Director General of Directorate General of Medical Services..

== History ==
In September 1971, during the Bangladesh Liberation war, the HQ of Directorate General Medical Services was established in Mujib Nagar, the capital of provisional government of Bangladesh. Squadron Leader M Shamsul Haque was the first Director General Medical Services of the Directorate General of Medical Services. Major Khurshid Uddin Ahmed was the first Director of Army Medical Services.

During the Bangladesh Liberation War, a total of 137 AMC soldiers including 14 officers were killed. Two officers and seven other ranks of AMC were awarded for their heroic activities with gallantry awards.

Besides, It had a team of almost two hundred doctors, nurses and paramedics deputed in Armed Forces of Kuwait.

== Units ==
- Army Medical Corps
- Army Dental Corps
- Armed Forces Nursing Services
- Directorate of Medical Services (Army)
- Directorate of Medical Services (Navy)
- Directorate of Medical Services (Air Force)
- Armed Forces Institute of Pathology
- Armed Forces Medical Institute
- Armed Forces Medical Store Depot
- Armed Forces Food and Drugs Laboratory
