= Army Medical College Jashore =

Bangladesh Army controlled private medical college

Coordinates: 23.1717°N 89.1769°E

- আর্মি মেডিকেল কলেজ, যশোর
- Type: Military Medical College
- Established: 10 January 2015 (11 years ago)
- Founder: Bangladesh Army
- Parent institution: Bangladesh University of Professionals
- Chairman: Maj Gen Md Hafizur Rahman (GOC 55 Inf Div & Area Comd Jashore Area)
- Principal: Brig Gen Wahed-Uz-Zaman, FCPS, MS
- Location: Jashore, Bangladesh
- Campus: Urban
- Language: English
- Website: https://amcj-bd.org

Army Medical College, Jashore (AMCJ) is a military medical school, established in 2014. It is located in Jashore Cantonment, in Jashore, Bangladesh. It is affiliated with Bangladesh University of Professionals. Academic activities began in January 2015.

It offers a five-year course of study leading to a Bachelor of Medicine, Bachelor of Surgery (MBBS) degree. A one-year internship after graduation is compulsory for all graduates. The degree is recognised by the Bangladesh Medical and Dental Council.
