= Armed Forces Medical College (Bangladesh) =

Public Medical college of Bangladesh

- আর্মড ফোর্সেস মেডিকেল কলেজ
- Crest of AFMC
- Motto: জ্ঞানই শক্তি, সেবাই ধর্ম
- Motto in English: Knowledge is power, service is religion
- Type: Public medical school
- Established: 1999; 27 years ago
- Academic affiliations: Bangladesh University of Professionals
- Commandant: Major General Masudul Alam Mazumder
- Location: Dhaka, Bangladesh; 23.8198°N 90.4080°E
- Campus: Urban
- Website: afmc.edu.bd
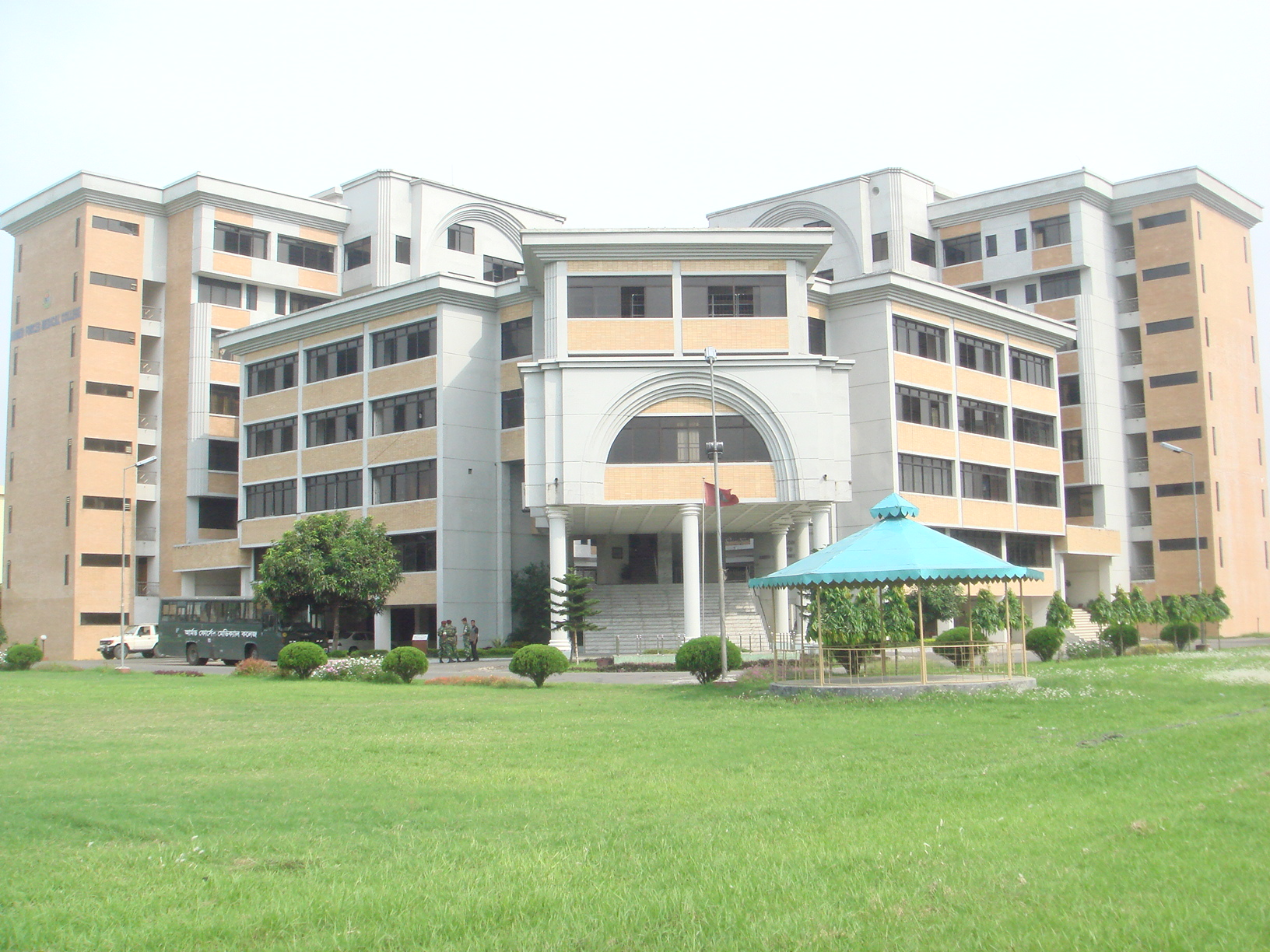
- Academic building of AFMC

The Armed Forces Medical College (AFMC) is a public medical school located in Dhaka Cantonment, Dhaka, Bangladesh. Until 2008, it was affiliated with the University of Dhaka. Currently it is affiliated with Bangladesh University of Professionals. A major general of Bangladesh Army's medical corps is the Commandant of the college.

== History ==
The Army Medical Corps (AMC) of Bangladesh Armed Forces requires induction of a good number of doctors every year. It has been observed that newly graduated doctors from the existing medical colleges can't always fulfill the requirements of the armed forces. Therefore, the government has decided to establish the AFMC to meet the requirement of militarily motivated and qualitatively better medical graduates for induction in the armed forces, as well as to provide disciplined and skilled doctors for the national healthcare service. The academic activities of the Armed Forces Medical College commenced through the induction of medical cadets on 20 June 1999.

== Aims and objectives ==
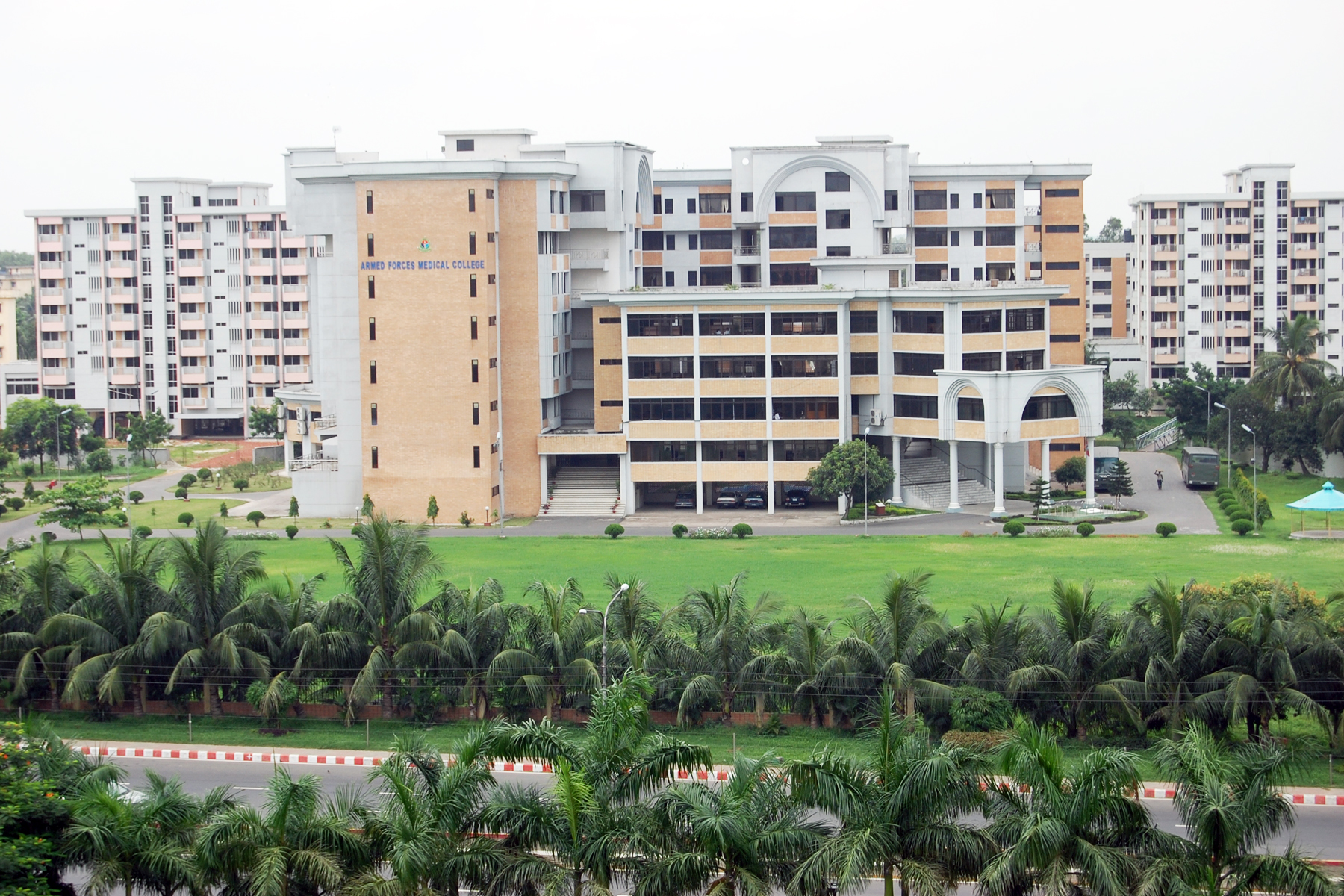
Campus of AFMC

The listed objectives of Armed Forces Medical College are a combination of medical instruction, military discipline, and general information regarding the nation of Bangladesh.

== Departments ==
Phase 1: Basic Science

- Anatomy
- Biochemistry
- Physiology

Phase 2 & 3: Para-clinical

- Community Medicine
- Forensic Medicine
- Pharmacology
- Pathology
- Microbiology

Phase 4: Clinical

- Medicine
- General Surgery
- Obstetrics & Gynecology
- Cardiology
- Neurology
- Gastroenterology
- Pulmonology
- Nephrology
- Psychiatry
- dermatology and venereology
- Pediatrics and Neonatology
- Otorhinolaryngology (Ear, Nose & Throat)
- Anesthesiology
- Ophthalmology
- Radiology
- Orthopedics

== Dormitories ==
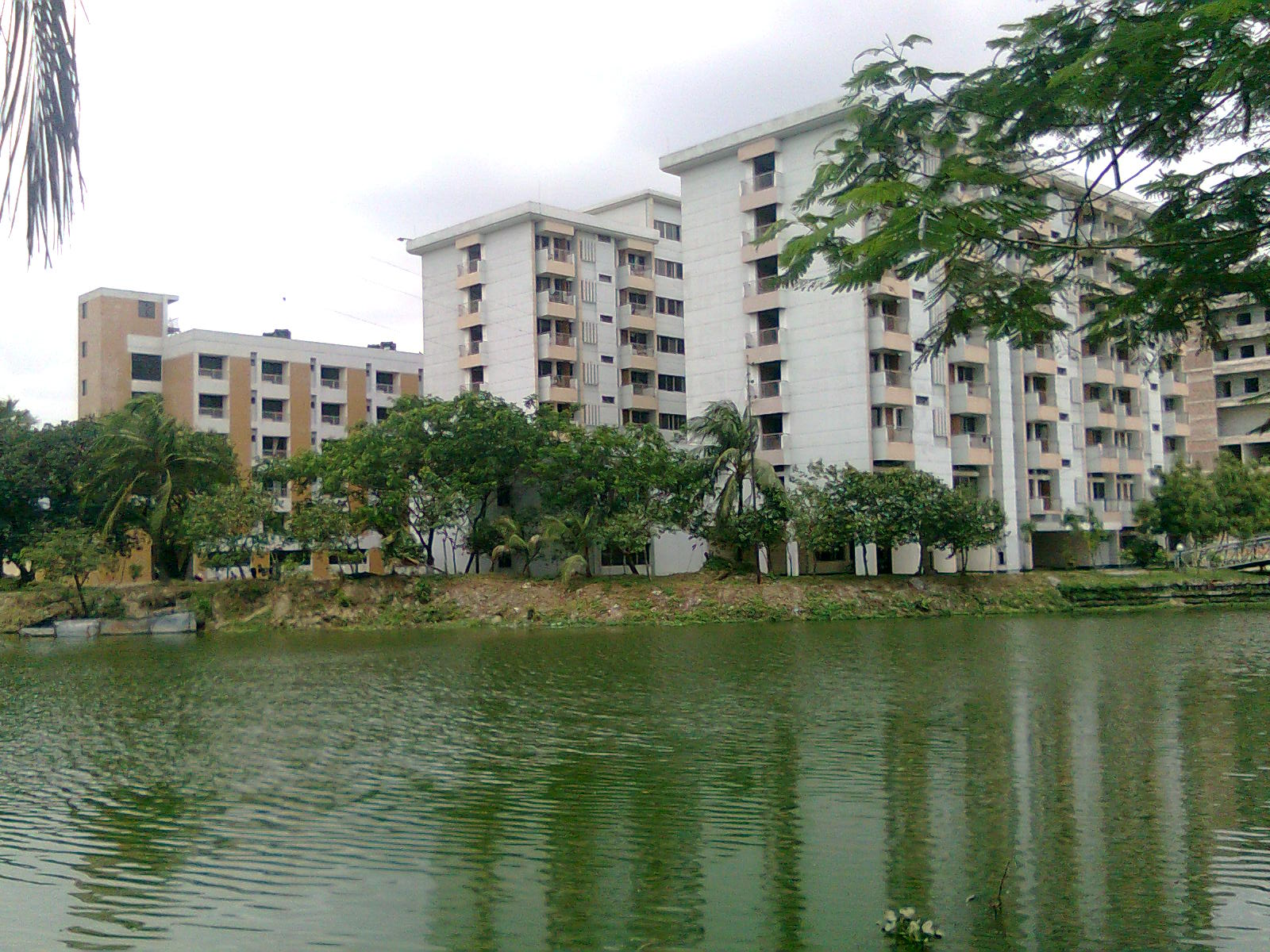
Male dormitory A & B block, Intern dormitory (From front to behind)

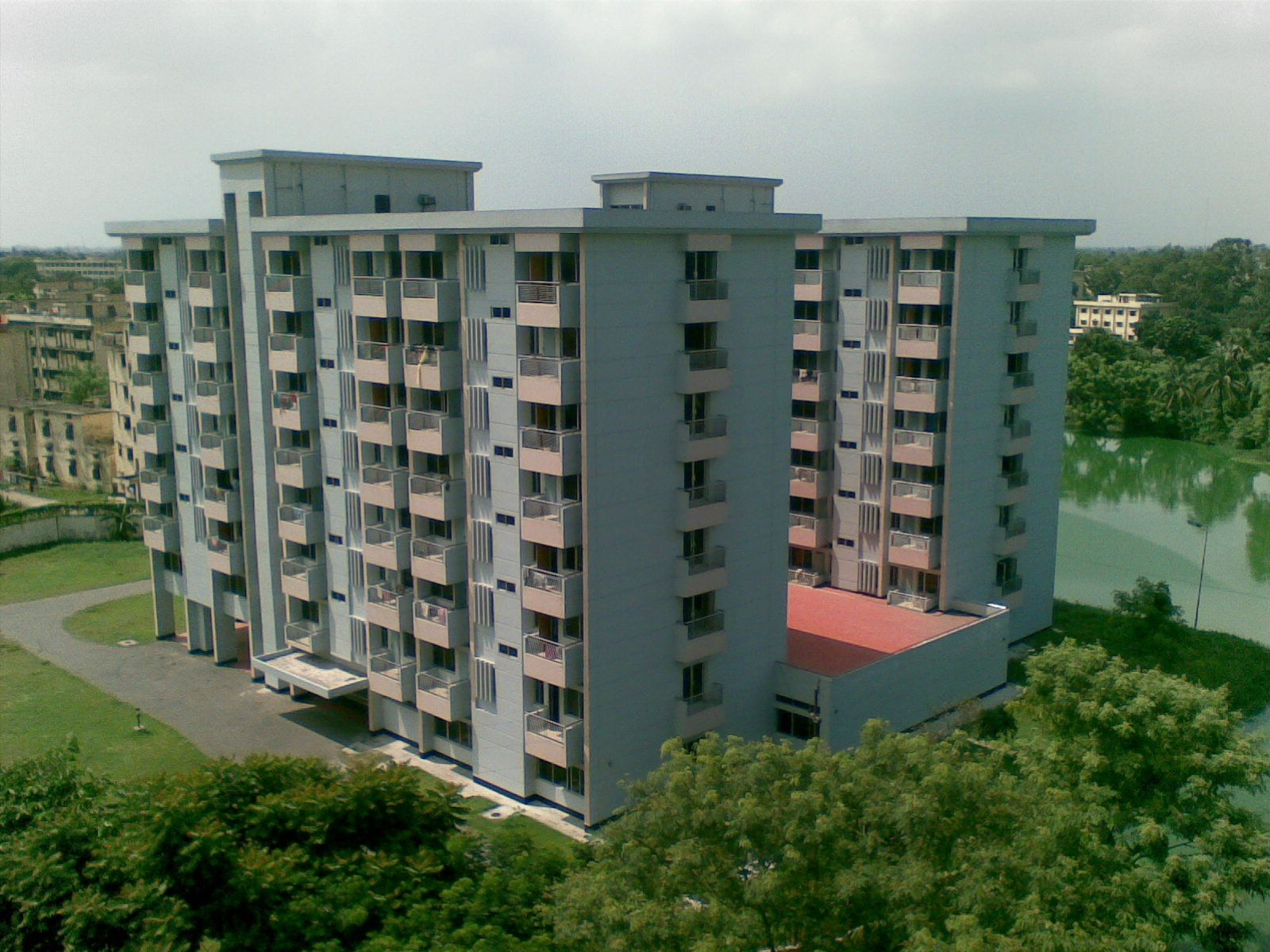
Female dormitory A & B block

AFMC students are viewed as 'medical cadets' and dormitory residency is compulsory. There are separate dormitories for male and female medical cadets located near the campus. The boys' dorm and the girls' dorm are identical in structure. After passing graduation, now-interns must move out of the dorms, however the option exists for outside living or an intern-only dormitory. The intern dorm is co-ed, however men and women are assigned separate sides of the building.

== See also ==
- Army Institute of Business Administration (Army IBA)
- Military Institute of Science & Technology (MIST)
- Army Medical College, Jessore
- Army Medical College, Chittagong
- Army Medical College, Bogra
- Army Medical College, Comilla
- Rangpur Army Medical College
