= Army Medical College Bogura =

Bangladesh Army controlled private medical college

Coordinates: 24.7550°N 89.3967°E

- আর্মি মেডিকেল কলেজ বগুড়া
- Monogram of AMCB
- Type: Military Medical College
- Established: 28 September 2014; 11 years ago
- Chairman: Maj Gen Towhidul Ahmed, ndc, afwc, psc
- Principal: Brig Gen Abul Kalam Azad MPH
- Location: Bogura, Bangladesh
- Campus: Suburban
- Website: amcb.edu.bd

Army Medical College Bogura (AMCB) is a Military medical college, established in 2014. It is located in Bogra Cantonment, Bangladesh. It is affiliated with Bangladesh University of Professionals. Academic activities began on 10 January 2015 with 50 students along with other 4 Army Medical Colleges (Chittagong, Rangpur, Cumilla & Jessore). Now, In 2026 it has >300 MBBS students (12th Batch running).

It offers a five-year course of study leading to a Bachelor of Medicine, Bachelor of Surgery (MBBS) degree. A one-year internship after graduation is compulsory for all graduates. The degree is recognized by the Bangladesh Medical and Dental Council.
