= Rangpur Army Medical College =

Bangladesh Army controlled private medical college

Coordinates: 25.7613°N 89.2312°E

Rangpur Army Medical College (RAMC)
- Established: 2014
- Principal: Brigadier General Mohammad Ahmed Ahsan MBBS, MPH, DAVN
- Location: Rangpur
- Website: amcrbd.org

Rangpur army Medical College (RAMC) (Bengali: রংপুর আর্মি মেডিকেল কলেজ) is a military medical school, established in 2014. It is located within Rangpur Cantonment, in Rangpur, Bangladesh. It is affiliated with the Bangladesh University of Professionals. Academic activities began in January 2015 with 50 students.

It offers a five-year course of study leading to a Bachelor of Medicine, Bachelor of Surgery (MBBS) degree. A one-year internship after graduation is compulsory for all graduates. The degree is recognised by the Bangladesh Medical and Dental Council.

The college has one male dormitory and three female dormitories.
