= Shaheed Ziaur Rahman Medical College =

Medical college in Bogura, Bangladesh

- শহীদ জিয়াউর রহমান মেডিকেল কলেজ
- Logo of Shaheed Ziaur Rahman Medical College
- Type: Public medical College
- Established: 5 November 1992; 33 years ago
- Academic affiliations: Rajshahi Medical University (MBBS); Bangladesh Medical University (Post graduate)
- Principal: Md Wadudul Hoque Tarafder
- Director: Brigadier General S M Nurul Irfan
- Academic staff: 106
- Students: 900
- Location: Bogra, Bangladesh; 24.8280°N 89.3531°E
- Campus: 40 acres (16 ha); Urban
- Language: English
- Website: szmc.gov.bd

Shaheed Ziaur Rahman Medical College (Bengali: শহীদ জিয়াউর রহমান মেডিকেল কলেজ) is a government medical school in Bangladesh, established on 5 November 1992. It is located in Bogra in Rajshahi. It is affiliated with the Rajshahi Medical University.

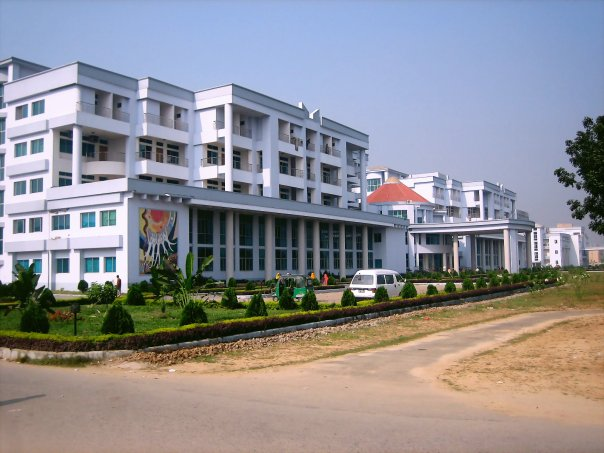
Front view of Shaheed Ziaur Rahman Medical College building

It has a 5-year medical education course leading to an MBBS degree. A one-year internship after graduation is compulsory for all graduates. The degree is recognised by the Bangladesh Medical and Dental Council.

== History ==
Shaheed Ziaur Rahman Medical College was established on 5 November 1992. At first, it was started as a medical college collaborating with Mohammad Ali Hospital, Bogra. In 2006, a brand new hospital and college campus was constructed on the outskirts of Bogra city, beside the Dhaka-Rangpur highway, named on the basis of once President Ziaur Rahman, who was born at Bogra. On 31 August 2006, the new campus at Silimpur started its journey. Previously, about 50 students could get the chance to study there through the nationwide examination for admission to public medical colleges in the country every year. From 2005, the numbers increased to about 180.

In July 2024, students of the medical college protested and expressed support for the students during the 2024 Bangladesh quota reform movement and blockaded a part of the Dhaka-Rangpur highway.

In August 2024, student politics and other types of politics were banned in the institution to prevent political violence in the medical college.

== Infrastructure ==
Shaheed Ziaur Rahman Medical College has an academic building and a multistoried teaching hospital named 'Shaheed Ziaur Rahman Medical College Hospital', situated in 40 acres of land. The pre-clinical and para-clinical departments are located in the college academic building and the clinical departments are located in the hospital building. The college premises have galleries 1, 2, 3, 4, tutorial rooms, dissection rooms, practical classrooms, laboratories and medical education wing. The college building has a medical skills center, autopsy morgue, seminar rooms, library and computer lab.

The campus also includes two boy's hostels, two lady's hostels, a central play ground, a volleyball court, a badminton court, a mosque and a canteen attached to the college building for the students.

Shaheed Ziaur Rahman Medical College also has a teaching hospital, which was established in 2006 as a 500-bedded hospital. The number of beds was increased to 1200, through an administrative approval by the Ministry of Health and Family Welfare on 13 November 2019.

== Affiliation ==
Shaheed Ziaur Rahman Medical College is an affiliated college of Rajshahi Medical University. Students complete a five-year course and pass the final MBBS examination to obtain an MBBS degree from Rajshahi Medical University. Professional examinations are conducted under the university and results are given. Internal examinations such as card completion, end of term and regular evaluation are conducted at regular intervals. In addition, the college conducts 2-year postgraduate diploma courses in 7 disciplines, a 2-year M.Phil course in physiology and a 5-year Doctor of Medicine (MD) course, which are affiliated with Bangladesh Medical University.

== See also ==
- List of medical colleges in Bangladesh
