= Army Institute of Business Administration, Savar =

Business school in Dhaka, Bangladesh

Army Institute of Business Administration (Army IBA)
- আর্মি ইনস্টিটিউট অব বিজনেস এডমিনিস্ট্রেশন (আর্মি আইবিএ)
- Other name: Army IBA
- Motto: Knowledge is Power
- Type: Public Business school
- Established: 2015
- Parent institution: Bangladesh Army
- Academic affiliation: Bangladesh University of Professionals
- Director: Brigadier General Syed Mohammad Shahed Rahman, MBA, MDS, M.Sc, nswc, afwc, psc (LPR)
- Academic staff: 10+
- Administrative staff: 20+
- Undergraduates: 1000+
- Postgraduates: 500+
- Location: Savar Cantonment, Savar, Dhaka, Bangladesh; 23.9063°N 90.2654°E
- Campus: Urban, 5 acres (2.0 ha)
- Website: aibasavar.edu.bd

Army Institute of Business Administration (Bengali: আর্মি ইনস্টিটিউট অব বিজনেস এডমিনিস্ট্রেশন), commonly known as Army IBA, is a business school run by the Bangladesh Army in affiliation with the Bangladesh University of Professionals (BUP) in Savar Cantonment, Savar, Dhaka.

== History ==
Army IBA was established by the BUP Act 2009 on 15 January 2015, by the Bangladesh Army, under the supervision of Prime Minister Sheikh Hasina, and was inaugurated on 5 March 2015, by the education minister, Nurul Islam Nahid. The founding director of Army IBA was Brigadier General A.K.M. Showkat Hasan (Retd).

The institute commenced its academic journey by launching the Bachelor of Business Administration (BBA) program, and 40 students were enrolled in the first batch.

== Administration ==
=== Governing body ===
Army IBA is subject to the regulations set out by the Bangladesh University of Professionals. The institute is chaired by the area commander, Savar, and governed by the Board of Governors. The director general (DG) is responsible for the overall management of the institution.

The present DG of Army IBA is Brigadier General Syed Mohammad Shahed Rahman, MBA, MDS, M.Sc., nswc, afwc, psc (LPR).

=== Board of trustees ===
A board, including the Chief of Army Staff and the vice-chancellor of the BUP, supervises the affairs of the institute.

=== Academic council ===
The Academic Council reviews academic programs of Army IBA. All instructors and associate professors of Army IBA are members of the board, and the director general of Army IBA is the chairperson of the board.

== Academics ==
Army IBA confers Bachelor of Business Administration (BBA) program for undergraduates and Master of Business Administration (MBA) program for graduates with major areas of specialization in marketing, finance, human resource management, supply chain management, etc. The BUP administers the academic curriculum in accordance with the rules of the University Grants Commission of Bangladesh.

== Admission procedure ==
Admission to the institute requires students to undergo a selection procedure. Students must meet the minimum required grade point average (GPA) in HSC and SSC or equivalent examinations to be eligible for the admission test. This academic record accounts for 25% of the total admission test score. Eligible students then take a 100-mark written test, contributing 50% to the total score. Those who perform well in the written test proceed to a communication skill test (viva), which makes up 25% of the total score. Finally, the institute selects 80–100 students with the best scores from all three stages.
