= Bangladesh University of Professionals =

Public university run by Bangladesh Armed Forces

- বাংলাদেশ ইউনিভার্সিটি অব প্রফেশনালস্
- Crest of BUP
- Other name: BUP
- Motto: জ্ঞানের মাধ্যমে উৎকর্ষ সাধন
- Motto in English: Excellence through knowledge
- Type: Public
- Established: 5 June 2008; 18 years ago
- Accreditation: University Grants Commission (UGC)
- Affiliations: Bangladesh Armed Forces
- Chancellor: President Mirza Fakhrul Islam Alamgir
- Vice-Chancellor: Major General Md Mahbub-ul Alam
- Pro-Vice-Chancellor: Khondoker Mokaddem Hossain
- Academic staff: 710+
- Administrative staff: 750+
- Students: 10,000+
- Undergraduates: 6,800+
- Postgraduates: 1,200+
- Doctoral students: 50+
- Other students: 6,050+
- Location: Mirpur Cantonment, Dhaka, 1216, Bangladesh; 23.8411°N 90.3577°E
- Campus: Urban, 30 hectares (75 acres)
- Language: English and Bengali
- Demonym: BUPians
- Alumni Associations: BUP Alumni Association, BUP Law Alumni Association [বিইউপি আইন অ্যালামনাই সমিতি]
- Colors: Golden and Green
- Website: bup.edu.bd

Bangladesh University of Professionals (Bengali: বাংলাদেশ ইউনিভার্সিটি অব প্রফেশনালস্), abbreviated as BUP, is a public university located in Mirpur Cantonment in Dhaka, Bangladesh. Established in 2008, it is operated by the Bangladesh Armed Forces for the higher education of military personnel and self-financed civilians. It affiliates higher educational institutions owned or operated by the military itself.

BUP was founded as the 31st public university of Bangladesh under the Bangladesh University of Professionals Act, 2009. It provides undergraduate and graduate programs across 22 departments in 6 faculties, including arts, social science, security studies, strategic studies, science and technology, business studies, and medical studies.

== History ==
Before the establishment of the Bangladesh University of Professionals (BUP), the educational institutions of the Bangladesh Armed Forces—about 56 in total—were affiliated with various public universities across the country.

The main purpose for the establishment of BUP was to unify all the educational institutions of the Bangladesh Armed Forces under one university administered by the armed forces. Following the purpose, on 5 June 2008, Bangladesh University of Professionals started its journey with the motto "Excellence through knowledge" in Mirpur Cantonment, Dhaka. Later, the Bangladesh University of Professionals Act, 2009 (Act No. 30 of 2009) was promulgated.

Although BUP is a military-administered institution, it is also a public university. So, anyone can gain admission to the university following the admission test. Currently, almost all the educational institutions of the Bangladesh Armed Forces are affiliated with BUP.

== Regulatory bodies ==
The university structure consists of the following bodies:

- Senate
- Syndicate
- Academic Council
- Finance Committee

== Administration ==
- Vice Chancellor

The current vice chancellor of BUP is Major General Md Mahbub-ul Alam.

- Pro Vice Chancellor

The current pro-vice chancellor of BUP is Khondoker Mokaddem Hossain

- Treasurer

The treasurer of BUP is Air Commodore Md Reza Emdad Khan

- Registrar

The registrar of BUP is Brigadier General Md Rabbi Ahsan

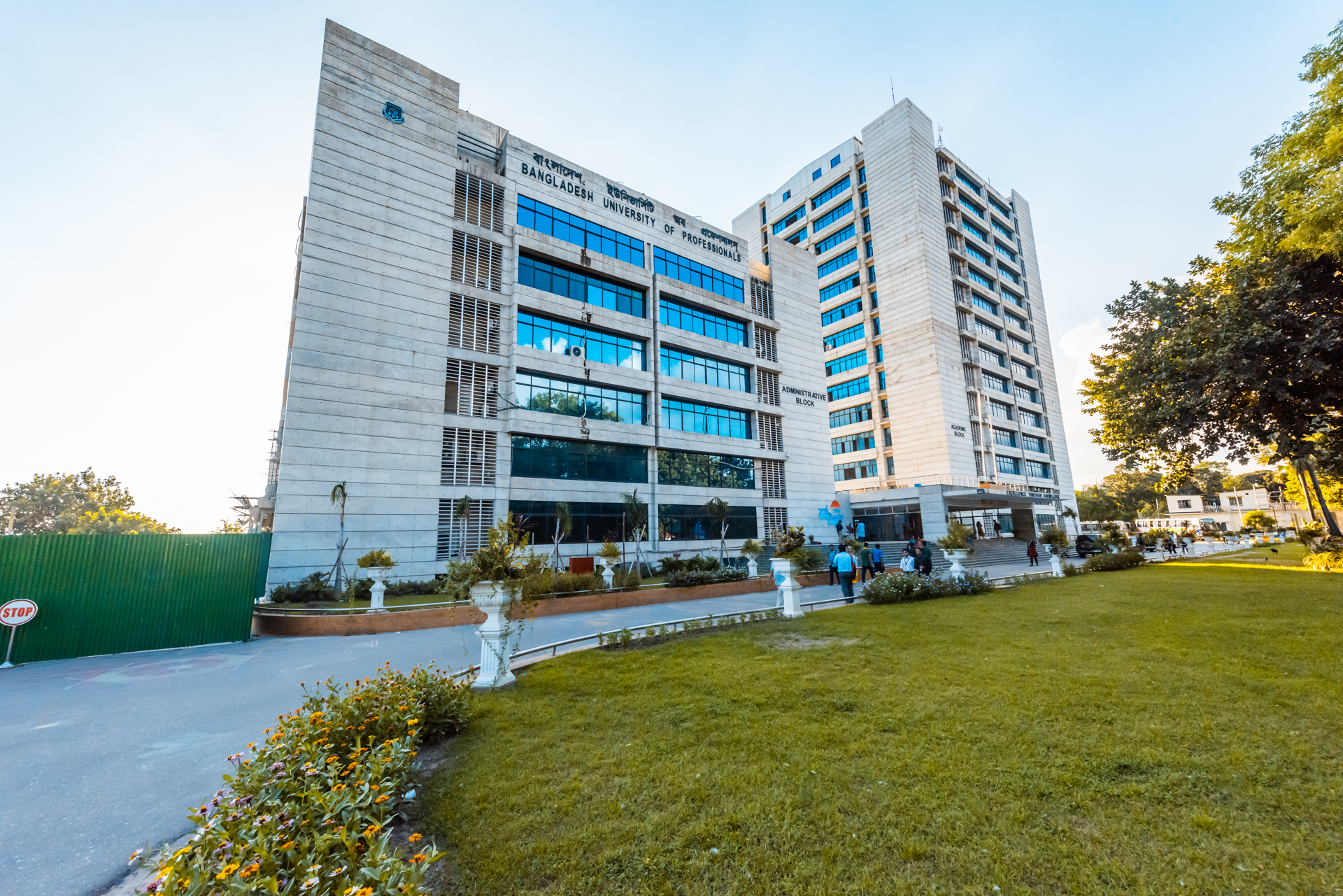
BUP Campus

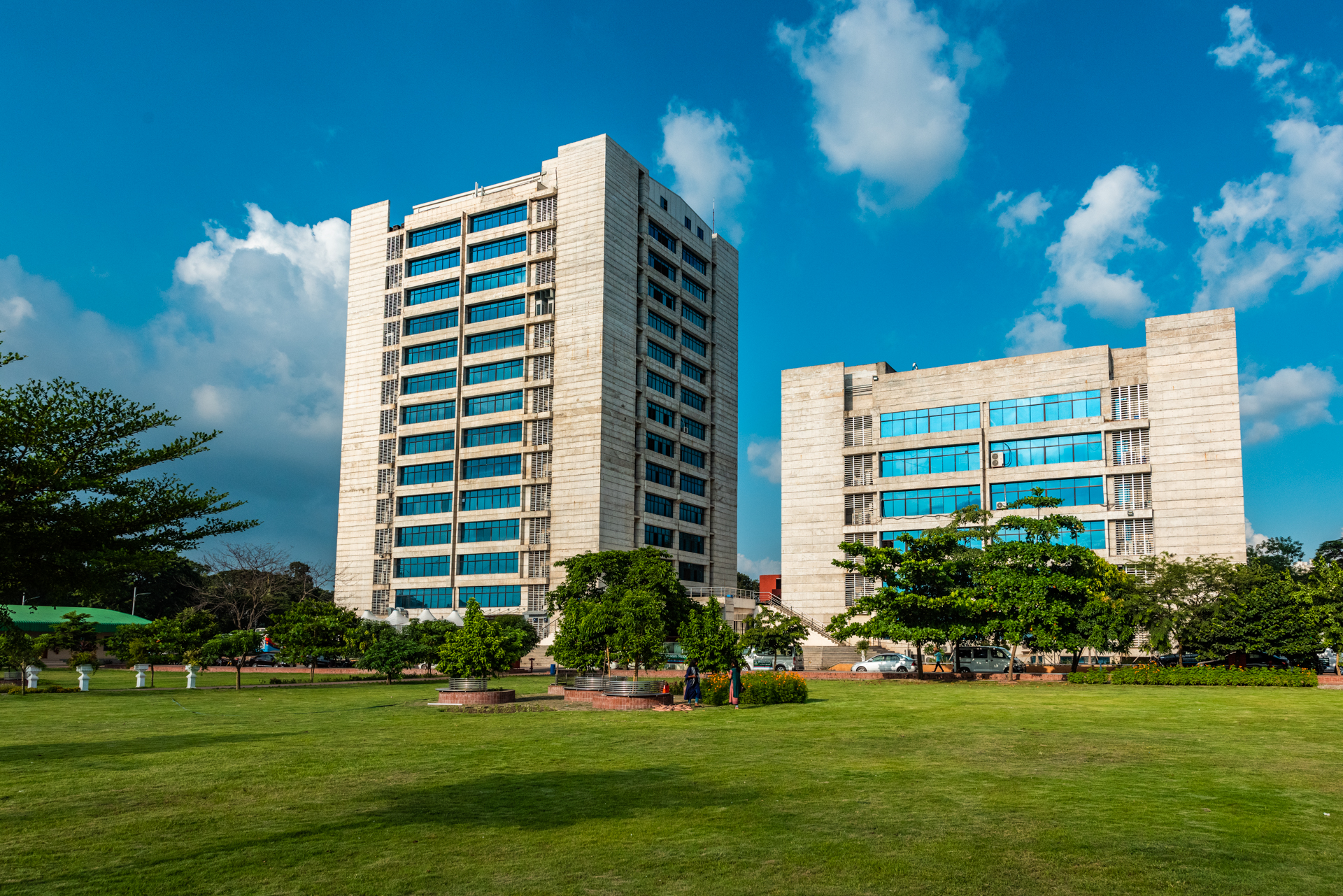
BUP campus back

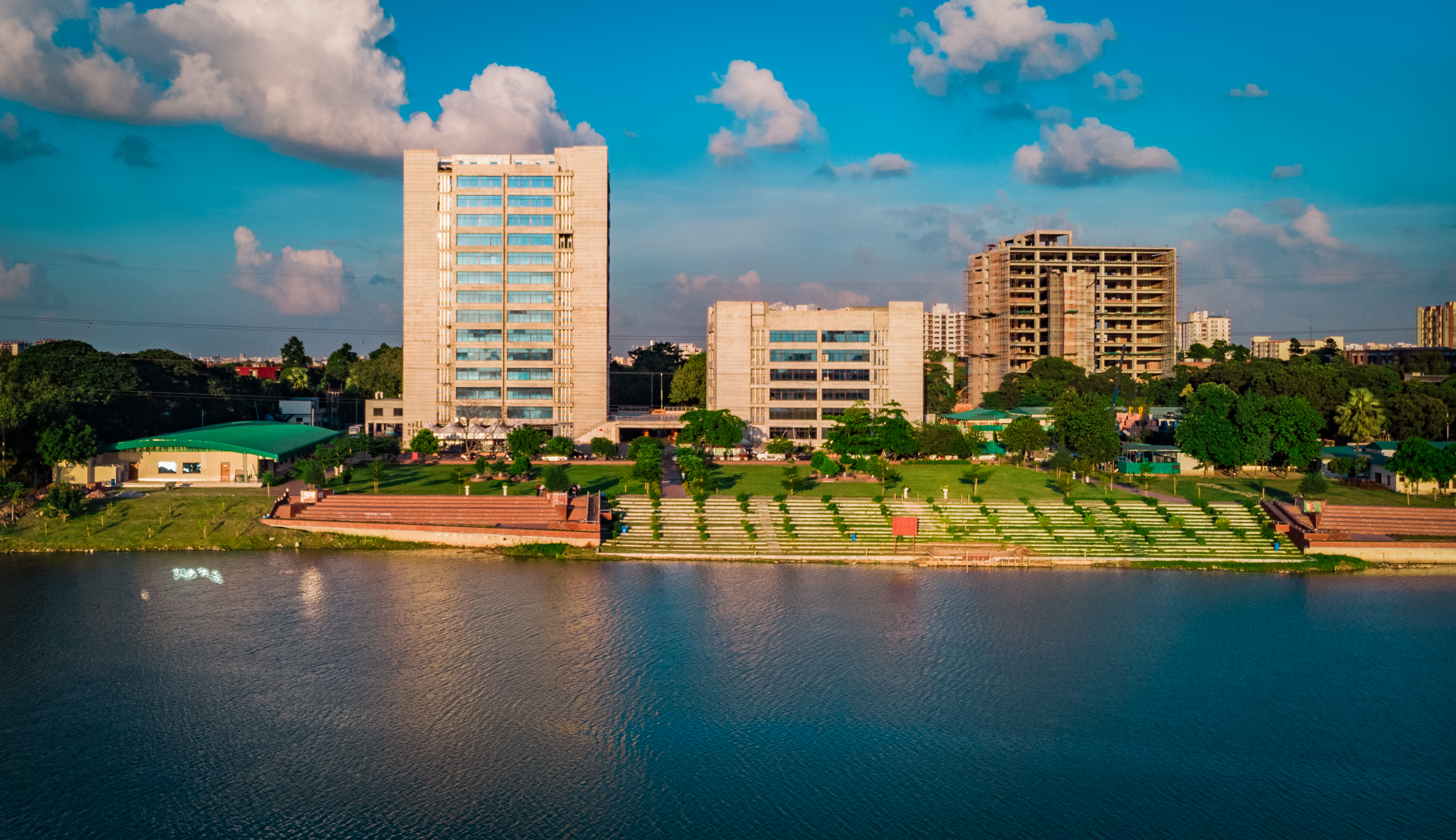
BUP campus aerial view

== Programs ==
Below is the list of the education levels for which the programs are available:

- Undergraduate Program
- Graduate Program
- Postgraduate Program
- Certificate Program
- MPhil
- PhD

== Admission process ==
Bangladesh University of Professionals (BUP) follows a structured admission process for undergraduate programs, including specific eligibility criteria, an application procedure, and an admission test.

=== Library and archives ===
The BUP Library and Archive began in 2010 with around 500 books, housed in a 200-square-foot room on the 3rd floor of the MIST Administrative Building. Over the years, it has expanded twice, in 2018 and 2021. As of June 2024, the library's collection comprises mainly department-related materials, with 28,063 books and 6,096 journals/magazines. Users can independently check out and return materials through an RFID-based library management system. In addition to a cyber corner, users also have off-campus access to 12 international e-resources via RemoteXs. Library services are continuously monitored and ensured for quality.

=== Accommodation halls ===
BUP has constructed two 14-story residential halls in the BUP residential area—one designated for male students and one for female students—providing accommodation for up to 2,000 students...

=== Sports and fitness ===
The Physical Education Centre began its activities when BUP was established in 2008. In August 2014, it became fully operational with the hiring of two physical education trainers, one male and one female.

=== Cafeteria ===
There are Four cafeterias in BUP, Vista Cafeteria, Amitié, Third Place,Pitstop.

=== Auditorium ===
There are two auditoriums at BUP. They are Bijoy Auditorium and Shadhinota Auditorium.

=== Medical services ===
The BUP Medical Center was inaugurated in March 2010 and operates under the supervision of the Vice Chancellor's office. It is staffed with a chief medical officer, a senior medical officer, one medical officer, one paramedic, two medical assistants, and two office assistants.

The medical center also offers 24-hour on-call medical support and ensures medical assistance during seminars, symposiums, workshops, sports events, and other university activities.

=== Transportation services ===
The Mechanical Transport (MT) Section is a division under the Registrar's office at Bangladesh University of Professionals (BUP). Despite having a limited number of vehicles and drivers relative to its increasing number of members, it provides dynamic commuting services for teachers, officers, staff, and students from key areas of Dhaka city. Additionally, the MT Section offers a 24/7 ambulance service to all affiliates of BUP at every level.

=== ICT services ===
The Bangladesh University of Professionals (BUP) has consistently supported the digitalization of its ICT Centre and entire institution to keep up with modernization efforts. A customized Enterprise Resource Planning (ERP) system has been developed to automate academic, financial, vehicle, store, and administrative activities. This system includes various integrated software, applications, and modules, with some still under development. The automation services also cover class attendance, assignments, and the publication of examination results. In line with these efforts, classrooms have been digitalized for teaching and learning. Recently, a web-based digital archive has been implemented to incorporate and preserve records of the institution's various activities.

== Academics ==
=== Faculties and departments ===
BUP currently provides undergraduate and graduate programs across 22 departments in 6 faculties and postgraduate programs through CHSR.

Faculty Of Business Studies (FBS)	Faculty of Arts and Social Science (FASS)	Faculty of Security & Strategic Studies (FSSS)	Faculty of Science & Technology (FST)	Faculty of Medical Studies (FMS)	Faculty of Business & Social Science (FBSS),(BMA)
Department of Business Administration General	Department of Sociology	Department of Law	Department of Information & Communication Engineering - (ICE)	Department of Public Health & Informatics	Department of International Relations (BMA)
Department of Accounting & Information Systems (AIS)	Department of English	Department of International Relations (IR)	Department of Environmental Science - (ES)	Department of Pharmacy	Department of Business Administration (BMA)
Department of Finance & Banking	Department of Economics	Department of Mass Communication & Journalism	Department of Computer Science and Engineering - (CSE)		Department of Economics (BMA)
Department of Management Studies	Department of Development Studies	Department of Peace, Conflict & Human Rights			
Department of Marketing	Department of Public Administration				
	Department of Disaster Management & Resilience				

=== Faculty of Business Studies (FBS) ===
- Undergraduate Programs
1. Bachelor of Business Administration General
2. BBA in Accounting and Information Systems (AIS)
3. BBA in Finance and Banking
4. BBA in Management Studies
5. BBA in Marketing
- Graduate Programs
1. Master of Business Administration in Accounting and Information Systems
2. Master of Business Administration in Finance and Banking
3. Master of Business Administration in Marketing
4. Master of Business Administration in Management Studies (HRM)
5. Master of Business Administration (Regular)
6. Master of Business Administration (Professional)

=== Faculty of Arts & Social Sciences (FASS) ===
- Undergraduate programs
1. BSS (Hons.) in Sociology
2. BA (Hons.) in English
3. BSS (Hons.) in Economics
4. BSS (Hons.) in Development Studies
5. BSS (Hons.) in Public Administration
6. BSS (Hons.) in Disaster Management and Resilience
- Graduate programs
1. Master of Social Science in Sociology
2. Master of Social Science in Economics
3. Master of Social Science in Development Studies
4. Master of Social Science in Public Administration
5. Master of Disaster and Human Security Management (MDHSM)
6. Master of Arts in English Literature & Cultural Studies
7. Master of Arts in English Language Teaching & Applied Linguistics

=== Faculty of Security & Strategic Studies (FSSS) ===
- Undergraduate programs
1. LLB (Hons.) in Law
2. BSS (Hons.) in International Relations (IR)
3. BSS (Hons.) in Mass Communication & Journalism
4. BSS (Hons.) in Peace, Conflict and Human Rights
- Graduate programs
1. Master of Laws (LLM-Professionals)
2. Master of Law (LLM)
3. Master of International Relations (MIR)
4. Master of Peace, Conflict & Human Rights Studies (MPCHRS)

=== Faculty of Science & Technology (FST) ===
- Undergraduate programs
1. BSc in Information & Communication Engineering - ICE
2. BSc (Hons.) in Environmental Science - ES
3. BSc in Computer Science and Engineering - CSE
- Graduate and postgraduate programs
1. Master in Information & Communication Technology (MICT)
2. Master in Information Systems Security (MISS)
3. Master in Information and Communication Engineering (MICE)
4. Masters in Environmental Science (MES)
5. Master in Computer Science and Engineering (MCSE)
6. Masters in Cyber Security (MCS)
- Postgraduate Programs
1. M.Sc./Masters in Environmental science and Management (MESM)

=== Faculty of Medical Science (FMS) ===
- Graduate programs
1. Master of Public Health and informatics (MPH) in Epidemiology
2. Master of Public Health and informatics (MPH) in Hospital Management
3. Master of Public Health and Informatics (MPH) in Climate Change & Health

=== Faculty of Business & Social Sciences (FBSS), (BMA) ===
1. International Relations (BMA)
2. Bachelor of Business Administration (BMA)
3. BSS (Hons.) in Economics (BMA)

=== Centre for Modern Languages (CML) ===
- English
- French
- German
- Japanese
- Chinese
- Turkish
- Arabic

=== Office of the Evaluation, Faculty & Curriculum Development ===
- Faculty Development Section
- Curriculum Development Section
- Institutional Quality Assurance Cell

=== Counselling & Placement Centre (CPC) ===
- Academic Counselling
- Socio-emotional Counselling
- Placement Centre

== Research ==
=== Centre for Higher Studies & Research (CHSR) ===
Postgraduate Programs

- Master of Philosophy
- Doctor of Philosophy
- Postdoctoral Research
- Publications

=== BUP Research Centre ===
- Faculty Research
- Independent Research/Innovation
- Consultancy

== Publications ==
=== Journal ===
- BUP Journal
- Faculty of Arts & Social Sciences Inquest Journal
- Journal of Faculty of Science & Technology
- Journal of Innovation in Business Studies

=== Magazine ===
- Cadence (annual magazine)

== Labs ==
- Media Lab
- Computer Lab
- Environmental Lab
- Electrical and Electronics Lab
- Communication Lab
- Turkish Language Lab
- Language Lab

== Rankings ==
As of 2 March 2025, BUP is ranked 23rd among 129 universities in Bangladesh by EduRank

== Notable people ==
=== Faculty and staff ===
==== Vice-chancellors ====
- Major General Abdul Wadud (2 August 2008 - 14 February 2009)
- Major General Md Shafiqul Islam (15 February 2009 - 16 February 2011)
- Brigadier General Mirza Iqbal Hayat (16 February 2011 - 24 April 2011)
- Brigadier General Chowdhury Hasan Sarwardy (24 May 2011 - 3 July 2011)
- Brigadier General Kazi Fakhruddin Ahmed (5 July 2011 - 23 August 2011)
- Major General Abul Kalam Md Humayun Kabir (26 August 2011 - 10 March 2013)
- Major General Sheikh Mamun Khaled (11 March 2013 - 22 August 2016)
- Major General Salahuddin Miaji (6 September 2016 - 30 December 2017)
- Major General Md Emdad-Ul-Bari (11 February 2018 - 2 March 2020)
- Major General Ataul Hakim Sarwar Hasan (3 March 2020- 1 December 2020)
- Major General Md Moshfequr Rahman (31 December 2020 - 4 April 2022)
- Major General Md Mahbub-ul Alam (5 April 2022 – present) (as of 2026)

==== Others ====
- Jobair Ahmad, pro-vice chancellor
- A. K. M. Manirul Bahar, chief of public relations, information, and publications
- Ashik Chowdhury, visiting assistant professor (2020–2021)
- Muhammad Ekramul Haque, adjunct professor of law
- Syed Anwar Husain, historian, Bangabandhu Chair
- Aminul Karim, professor of international relations
- Mahbubur Rahman, dean of Faculty of Medical Studies (2012)
- Md. Jahangir Kabir Talukder, adjunct professor
- Wahid-Uz-Zaman, senate committee member

=== Alumni ===
Notable alumni of the university mostly have been senior officers in the armed forces. Many of them have gone on to be diplomats or administrators in commerce or academia. Most have been Bangladeshi, but several have been Nigerian. Others have included a student, a civil servant, a diplomat, an entertainer, and a police officer.

- Mohammad Saiful Abedin, army officer
- Mohammed Nurul Absar, navy officer
- Aziz Ahmed, chief of army staff (2018–2021)
- Molla Fazle Akbar, army officer
- Mohammad Jahangir Alam, army officer
- Muhammad Mahbub-ul Alam, army officer
- Abu Belal Muhammad Shafiul Haque, chief of army staff (2015–2018)
- Tukur Yusufu Buratai, chief of army staff, Nigeria (2015–2021)
- Mahbubus Samad Chowdhury, army officer
- Mansur Dan-Ali, minister of defence, Nigeria (2015–2019)
- Tasnia Farin, actress, model, and singer
- Akhtar Habib, navy officer
- A. K. M. Aminul Haque, army officer
- Mohammad Mozammel Haque, navy officer
- Abul Hossain, army officer
- Mohammad Akbar Hossain, army officer
- M. Sakhawat Hussain, adviser in the Yunus ministry (2024–2026)
- Lucky Irabor, chief of defence staff, Nigeria (2021–2023)
- AKM Shamsul Islam, defence adviser to Prime Minister Tarique Rahman
- Muhammad Nazrul Islam, air force officer
- Md. Abdul Karim, civil servant
- Sheikh Mamun Khaled, army officer
- Mohammad Mainul Islam, chief of general staff (2013–2015)
- Mohammad Mostafizur Rahman, air force officer
- Mir Mugdho, student killed during the 2024 Bangladesh quota reform movement
- Mohammad Musa, navy officer
- A. K. M. Mustafa Kamal Pasha, army officer
- AKM Shahidur Rahman, police officer
- M Mustafizur Rahman, air force officer
- Masudur Rahman, diplomat
- Mohammed Moshfequr Rahman, army officer
- Shafiqur Rahman, chief of the general staff (2018–2021)
- S. M. Shafiuddin Ahmed, chief of army staff (2021–2024)
- Mohammad Ashrafuzzaman Siddiqui, army officer
- Mijanur Rahman, civil judge

== Affiliated institutes ==
As of 2025, there are a total of 56 institutions affiliated with Bangladesh University of Professionals.

- Armed Forces Medical College (AFMC)
- Armed Forces Medical Institute (AFMI)
- Armed Forces Institute of Pathology (AFIP)
- Army Institute of Business Administration (Army IBA, Sylhet)
- Army Institute of Business Administration (Army IBA, Savar)
- Army Medical Colleges (AMC)
- Navy Medical College
- Bangladesh Air Force Academy (BAFA)
- Bangladesh Military Academy (BMA)
- Bangladesh Naval Academy (BNA)
- Defense Service Command and Staff College (DSCSC)
- Military Institute of Science and Technology (MIST)
- National Defense College (NDC)
- Proyash Institute of Special Education and Research (PISER)
