= Armed Forces Medical Institute =

Educational institute of the Army Medical Corps of Bangladesh Army

Coordinates: 23.814132°N 90.401693°E

Armed Forces Medical Institute (AFMI) is the premier educational institute of the Army Medical Corps of Bangladesh Army. Immediately after liberation in 1971 to cope with the expansion of Armed Forces and to ensure efficient medical support at all levels, it was felt necessary to establish an institute for imparting training to Army Medical Corps (AMS), Army Dental Corps (ADC) and Armed Forces Nursing Services (AFNS) officers and other paramedics on various professional matters. It came into being on 2 January 1976.

== Objectives ==
The ultimate objective of the AFMI is to turn each and every member of the AMC, ADC and AFNS into military medical personnel of advanced knowledge and expertise, capable of matching the challenge of handling modern war casualty, as well as peacetime patient care and to impart professional training and run courses for AMC, ADC, AFNS officers and ORS. AFMI is well keeping with the nation building motto of the Government. As a part of its human resource development for the nation and beyond, Nursing Institute of AFMI started conducting BSc (Nursing) and Diploma in Nursing and Midwifery courses to produce nursing staff for national health services.
