= Bangladesh Military Academy =

Officer Cadets training institution of Bangladesh Army

Coordinates: 22°25′24″N 91°45′10″E

- বাংলাদেশ মিলিটারি একাডেমি
- Motto: চির উন্নত মম শির
- Motto in English: Ever High is My Head
- Type: Military Academy
- Established: 1974; 52 years ago
- Affiliations: ARTDOC; BUP; MIST
- Dean: Brigadier general Kamal Mamun
- Director: Brigadier general Luftar Rahman
- Commandant: Major General Khandaker Muhammad Shahidul Emran
- Academic staff: 600 – 700 (both civilian and military)
- Undergraduates: 1,550 – 1,600
- Location: Bhatiary, Sitakunda Upazila, Chittagong, Bangladesh
- Campus: Suburb, 1,850 acres (750 ha)
- Colours: Red and green
- Website: bma.army.mil.bd

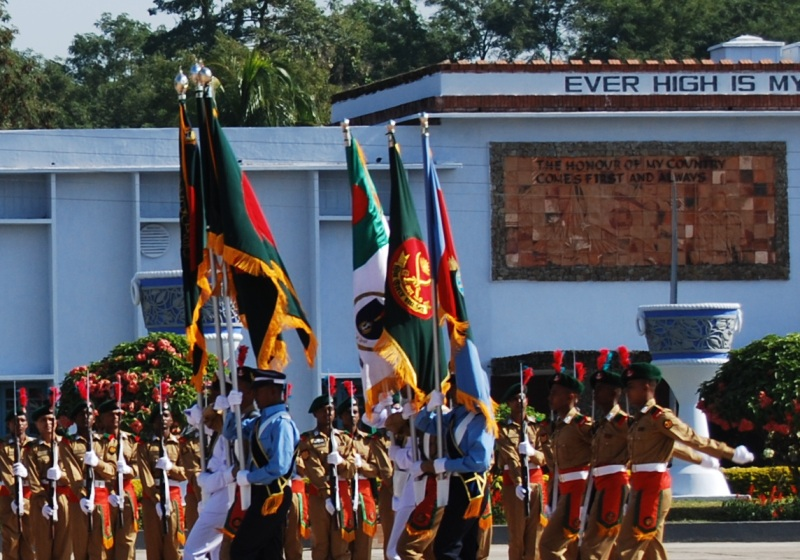
Colours contingent in the passing out parade

Bangladesh Military Academy (BMA) is a military service academy for the training of officer cadets of the Bangladesh Army. It is located in Bhatiary, Sitakunda Upazila, in the Chittagong District of south-eastern Bangladesh.

== History ==
Following the independence of Bangladesh following the break-up of Pakistan in the Bangladesh War of Independence 1971, Bangladesh Military Academy was established in January 1974 for training the officers of the army. The military academy was opened in 1974. The academy was initially raised at Comilla Cantonment on 29 November 1973 and later relocated to Bhatiari, Chittagong, in 1976. The academy was awarded the National Standard in 1979.

The Bangladesh Military Academy provides training to the officers of the Bangladesh Army. From 1983, the officers of the Bangladesh Navy and Bangladesh Air Force also take three months of initial military training from the academy.

The academy chose a verse by national poet Kazi Nazrul Islam, Chiro Unnata Momo Shir (translation: ever high is my head) as its motto. Regular long courses commenced in 1978. The first batch of Bangladesh Army officers graduated from the academy on 11 January 1975. It is affiliated with the ARTDOC.

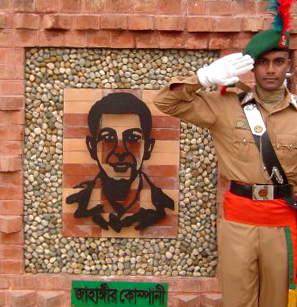
Officer Cadet (Khaki Ceremonial Dress)

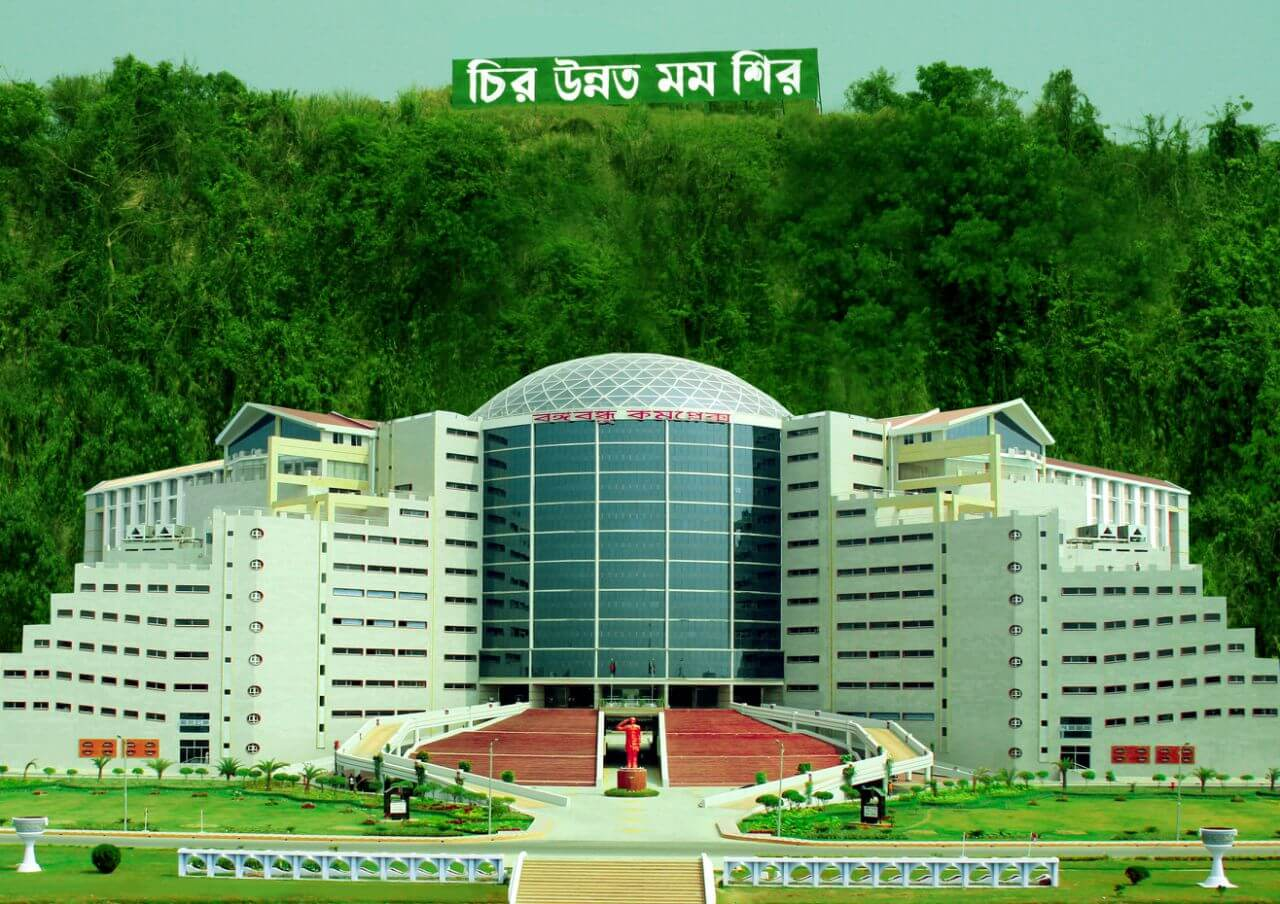
Bangabandhu Complex, Bangladesh Military Academy

== Selection ==
Entrants must be higher secondary school graduates. They must be at least 160 centimetres (63 in) tall, weigh at least 49.8 kilograms (110 lb), and be unmarried. Selection is highly competitive. Candidates must undergo a rigorous investigation of their background and educational performance, a complete physical exam, an initial interview, a written test, and an intensive three-day examination/interview. The selection process is intended to be non-political. Overwhelmingly, those accepted are disinterested in or disdainful of politics.

The majority of cadets are from middle-class or lower-middle-class families. Eighty percent have rural origins. Most, however, attended well-regarded urban schools or cadet colleges.

Foreign officers regularly attend one-year courses at the academy. In 2019, about ten percent of the graduating class were from abroad, mostly from Saudi Arabia.

== Training ==
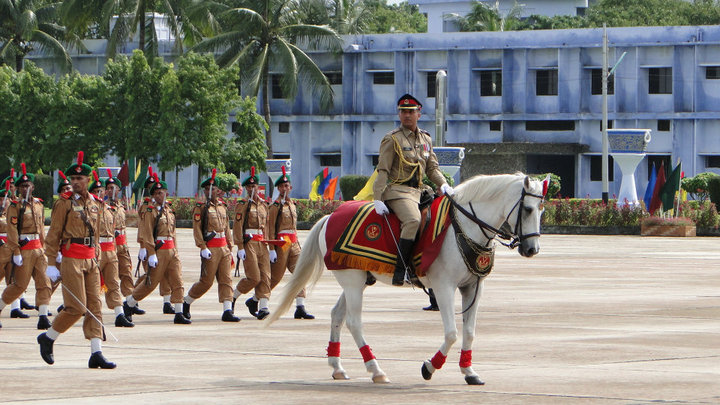
Adjutant in the passing out parade

BMA provides military and academic training and character building. The academy primarily trains men and women to be commissioned into the Bangladesh Army. In addition, the academy conducts an orientation course for Bangladesh Civil Service (BCS) officers, and officer cadets and midshipmen of the Bangladesh Air Force and Navy, respectively, and pre-commission training for professor/teacher under-officers of Bangladesh National Cadet Corps (BNCC). Long Course cadets graduating from this academy fall under Bangladesh University of Professionals (BUP) and Military Institute of Science and Technology (MIST) curriculum. The academy has the intention of fostering and inculcating those attributes in an Officer Cadet (OC), which will ensure his continuous and progressive development as a regular officer in the Bangladesh Army, and developing future officers for the Bangladesh Army by training the Officer Cadets in a way that they can make decisions as and when required by the military profession.

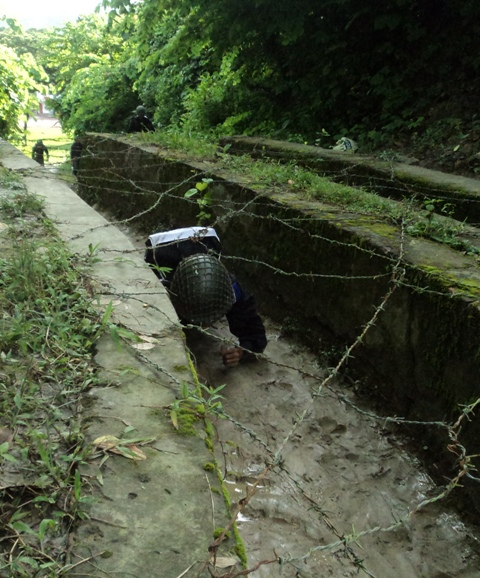
Assault course

== Training course ==
The training courses run at BMA are as follow:

- Long Course – 3 years.
- BMA Special Regular Course – 24 weeks.
- Basic Military Training Course – 24 weeks.
- Joint Services Course – 10 weeks (Bangladesh Navy cadets and Bangladesh Air Force cadets).
- Direct Short Service Commission – 49 weeks
- Potential Platoon Commanders Course – 05 weeks.
- Drill Instructor Course – 07 weeks.
- BCS Officers Orientation Course weeks (01 week in BMA) – 05 weeks.
- Post Commission Academic Training (PCAT) - Final Semester of Bangladesh University of Professionals (BUP) (4–6 months)

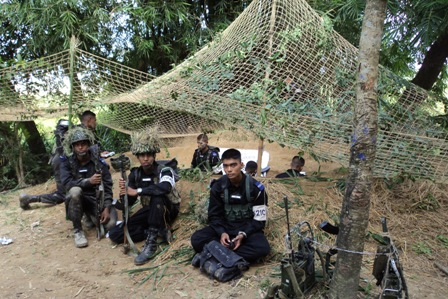
Outdoor exercise

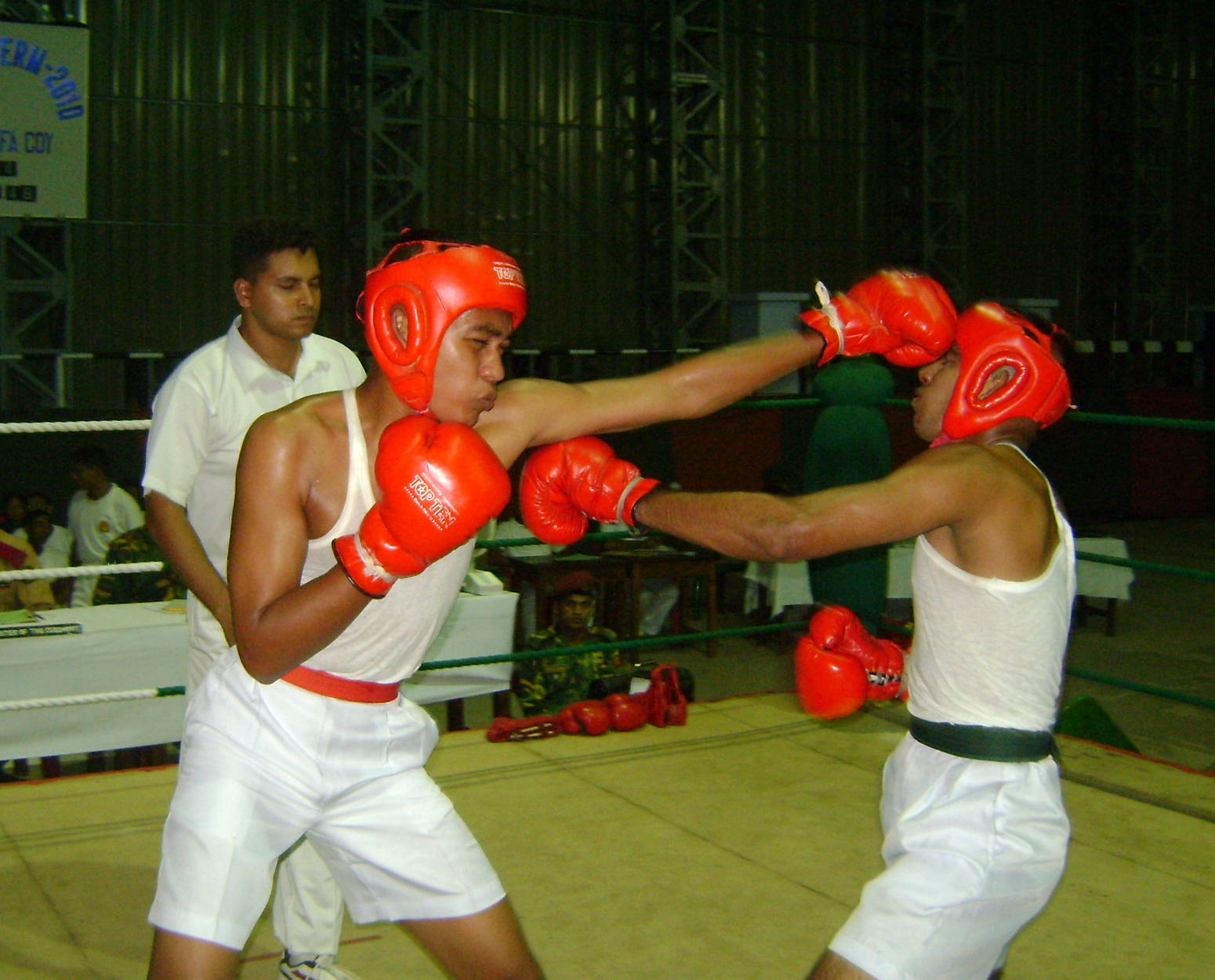
Cadet's boxing competition

== Academic training ==
This training is mainly conducted to prepare the cadets of long courses for qualifying in the Bachelor of Arts (BA)/Bachelor of Science (BSc) (Pass Course) examinations. From the 67 BMA Long Course, there will be a common degree. That is Bachelor of Defence Studies (BDS). From the 75 BMA Long Course there are 8 subjects to study: international relations, BBA, economics, physics, computer science & engineering, electrical, electronics & communications engineering, mechanical engineering, and civil engineering. The academic training also aimed at developing communication skills both in English and Bangla through oral and written expression, creating awareness of current national, regional, and international affairs, and widening the mental horizon and sense of reasoning.

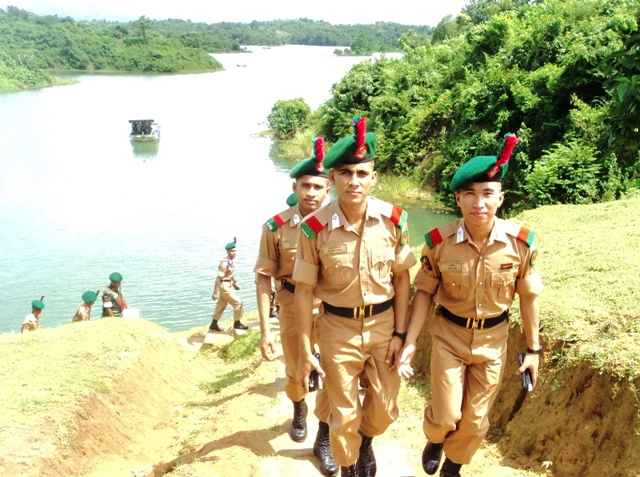
Remote army camp in Chittagong Hill Tracts

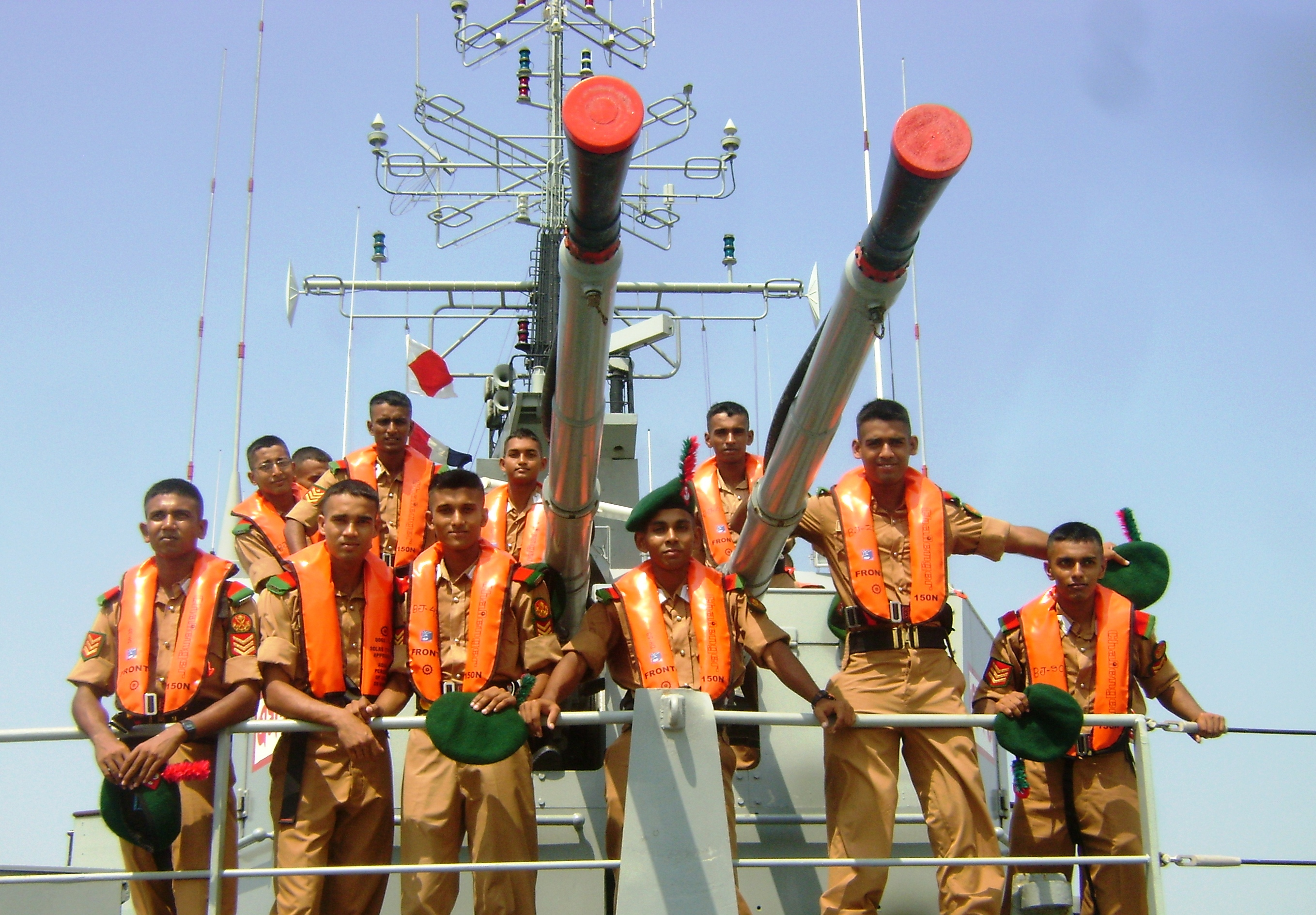
Bangladesh Navy Flotilla visit

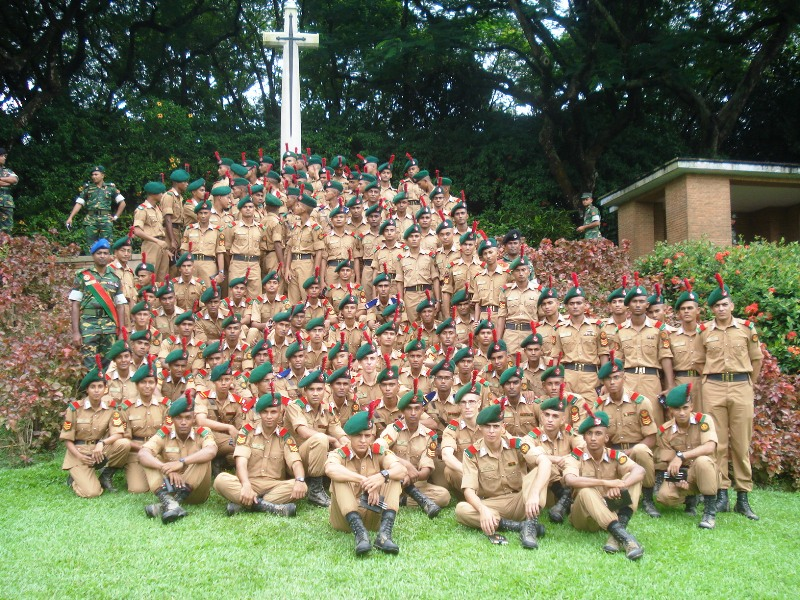
Comilla War Cemetery (WWII)

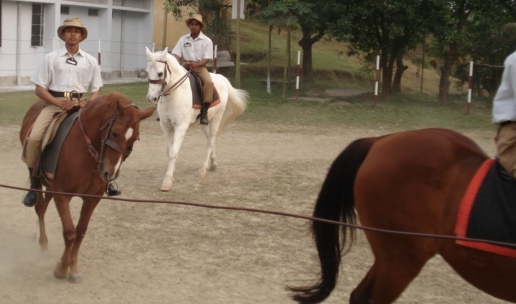
Riding Club

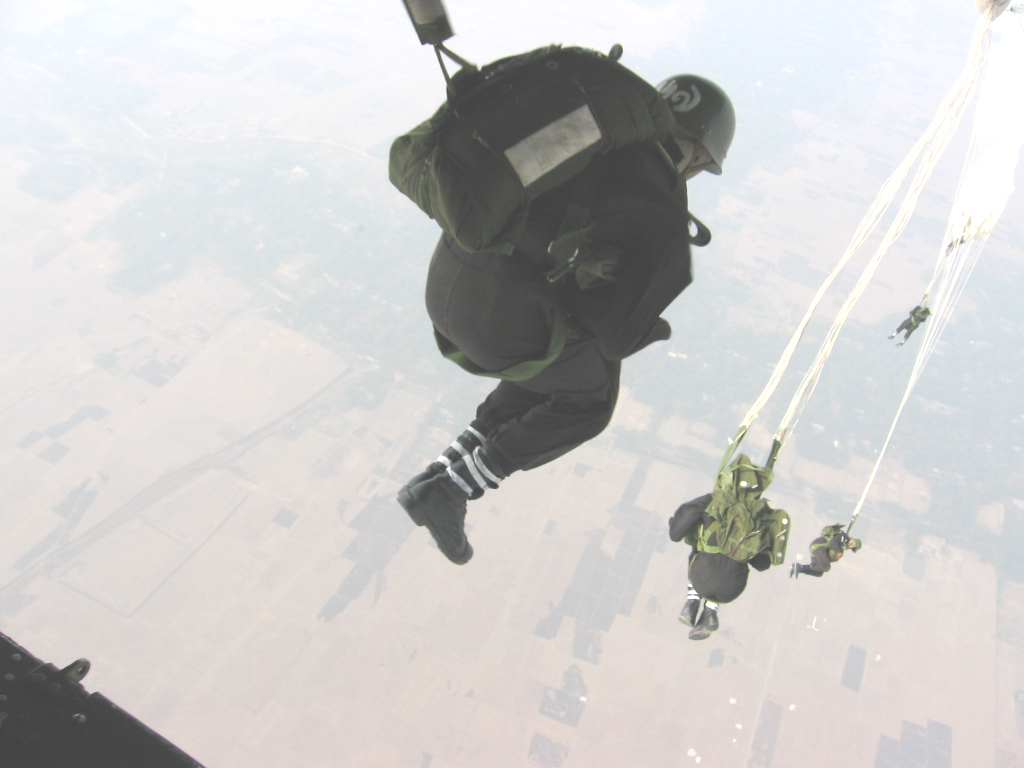
Cadet's para jump

== Publications ==
BMA has two publications, namely, Chiro Unnoto Momo Shir (Ever High Is My Head) is BMA magazine and Padakhkhep (Onward March), a professional journal. Both the publications are published once a year.

== Battalions and companies ==
For training, the officer cadets are organized under two battalions known as the First Bangladesh Battalion and the Second Bangladesh Battalion. The first battalion consists of five companies, named in honour of five out of the seven recipients of the Bir Sreshtho, the highest military award in Bangladesh. On 18 June 2026, Chief of Army Staff General Waker-Uz-Zaman inaugurated the Second Bangladesh Battalion. The companies of the Second Battalion are named after the four companions of Prophet Muhammad.

1st Bangladesh Battalion
Company Name	Eponym
Jahangir Company	Captain Mohiuddin Jahangir
Rouf Company	Lance Naik Munshi Abdur Rouf
Hamid Company	Sepoy Hamidur Rahman
Mostafa Company	Sepoy Mostafa Kamal (Bir Sreshtho)
Nur Mohammad Company	Lance Naik Nur Mohammad Sheikh

2nd Bangladesh Battalion
Company Name	Eponym
Abu Bakr Company	Abu Bakr, 1st Caliph
Umar Company	Umar, 2nd Caliph
Usman Company	Usman, 3rd Caliph
Ali Company	Ali, 4th Caliph

== Affiliation ==
The academy provides a three-year academic programme combined with intense military training. It is affiliated with the Bangladesh University of Professionals and Military Institute of Science and Technology that provides 4-year bachelor's degrees. Every cadet has to study military science in this institution. They have to learn everything practically.

== Notable alumni ==
- General Waker-Uz-Zaman, 18th Chief of Army Staff of Bangladesh Army
- General S. M. Shafiuddin Ahmed, 17th Chief of Army Staff of Bangladesh Army
- General Aziz Ahmed, 16th Chief of Army Staff of Bangladesh Army
- General Abu Belal Muhammad Shafiul Haque, 15th Chief of Army Staff of Bangladesh Army
- Brigadier General AKM Shamsul Islam, Defence Adviser to the Prime Minister of Bangladesh
- Major Gazi Md Maksud Ur Rahim(retd), Senior Manager, KDS Group

== See also ==
- ARTDOC
- School of Infantry and Tactics
- Bangladesh Naval Academy
- Bangladesh Air Force Academy
- Bangladesh Police Academy
