= Rafiqul =

Rafiqul is a given name. Notable people with the name include:

- Rafiqul Alam (cricketer) (born 1957), Bangladeshi cricketer
- Rafiqul Alam (singer), Bangladeshi musician
- Rafiqul Anwar (died 2012), Bangladesh Awami League politician
- Rafiqul Islam Bakul Bangladesh Nationalist Party politician
- Mohd. Rafiqul Alam Beg (born 1959), Bangladeshi professor of mechanical engineering
- Rafiqul Bari Chowdhury (1930–2005), Bangladeshi cinematographer-turned-director
- Rafiqul Islam Chowdhury (died 2008), Bangladesh academic and political scientist
- Shah Rafiqul Bari Chowdhury, Jatiya Party politician and former MP
- Rafiqul Haque (1937–2021), Bangladeshi journalist and poet
- Syed Rafiqul Haque, Bangladeshi politician
- Rafiqul Hossain (1936–2016), Jatiya Party politician and former MP
- Kazi Rafiqul Islam, Bangladesh Nationalist Party politician and former MP
- M. Rafiqul Islam, Bangladeshi academician, professor and writer
- Md Rafiqul Islam, retired Bangladesh Army major general & Director General of Border Guards
- Mohammad Rafiqul Islam (born 1952), former Chief of Bangladesh Air Force
- Rafiqul Islam (activist) (1950–2013), Bangladeshi-born Canadian language activist
- Rafiqul Islam (Bangladeshi politician), Bangladesh Awami League politician
- Rafiqul Islam (civil servant) (born 1955), Bangladeshi civil servant & Election Commissioner
- Rafiqul Islam (educationist) (1934–2021), Bangladeshi educationist, scholar, writer, linguist and cultural activist
- Rafiqul Islam (Indian politician), Indian politician, member of Assam Legislative Assembly
- Rafiqul Islam (Jessore politician), politician & former MP
- Rafiqul Islam (scientist) (1936–2018), Bangladeshi physician and medical scientist
- Mohammad Rafiqul Islam Khan (born 1977), Bangladeshi cricketer
- Rafiqul Hassan Khan (1958–1981), Bangladeshi army officer, executed
- Rafiqul Islam Miah, Bangladeshi barrister and politician
- Rafiqul Islam Roni, Jatiya Party politician & former MP

== See also ==
- Rafiqul Islam (disambiguation), Arabic phrase meaning Companion of Islam
- Rafi (disambiguation)
- Rafiq
