= Ataul Hakim Sarwar Hasan =

Bangladeshi military officer

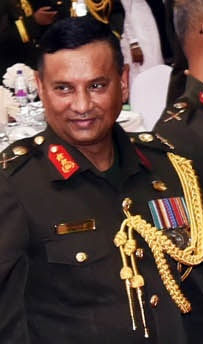
- Hakim in 2018
- Born: 1 January 1966 (age 60); Narsingdi, East Pakistan, Pakistan
- Military career
- Allegiance: Bangladesh
- Branch: Bangladesh Army
- Service years: 1984–2023
- Rank: Lieutenant General
- Unit: Bangladesh Infantry Regiment
- Commands: Chief of the General Staff; Commandant of National Defence College; Vice-Chancellor of Bangladesh University of Professionals; GOC of 55th Infantry Division; Commander of Logistics Area; GOC of 10th Infantry Division; Commander of 71st Mechanized Brigade; Commander of 77th Infantry Brigade
- Awards: Senabahini Padak (SBP); Sena Gourab Padak(SGP)

Ataul Hakim Sarwar Hasan (Note: SBP, SGP, ndc, afwc, psc, Phd) (born 1 January 1966) is a retired three-star general of the Bangladesh Army who served as chief of general staff. He is a former vice-chancellor of Bangladesh University of Professionals.

== Early life ==
Sarwar was born on 1 January 1966 in Narsingdi. He enlisted to Bangladesh Military Academy (BMA) on 1982 and was commissioned with the 11th BMA long course on 1984. His parent unit is 10th East Bengal Regiment. Sarwar is a graduate from Defence Services Command and Staff College, National Defence College, Armed Forces War College and the Brazilian Army Command and General Staff College .

== Career ==
Sarwar taught at Bangladesh Infantry Regimental Centre and commanded a Bangladesh Infantry Regiment. He served as the director general of Armed Forces Division and as strategic planner of United States Central Command as brigadier general. Sarwar also commanded a mechanized brigade in Savar and an infantry brigade in Mymensingh. Sarwar was ameliorated to major general and was the pioneer general officer commanding, 10th Infantry Division and area commander of Cox's Bazar Area. In 2017, he was the chief patron of Bangladesh International School and College and the logistics area commander. He also served as the general officer commanding of 55th Infantry Division and area commander, Jashore Area. As Jashore area commander, Sarwar was also the president of Jashore Golf and Country Club. On 5 March 2020, Sarwar was appointed vice-chancellor of Bangladesh University of Professionals.

Sarwar was promoted to lieutenant general and was appointed commandant of National Defence College on 26 November 2020. On 13 January 2021, he was appointed chief of general staff at army headquarters. He went on retirement December, 2023.

== Personal life ==
Sarwar is married to Begum Farzana Hasan, an associate professor of Shaheed Bir Uttam Lt. Anwar Girls College. The couple has twin sons.
