= Rafiqul Islam =

Rafiqul Islam (Bengali: রফীকুল ইসলাম) is a Bengali masculine given name of Arabic origin. It may refer to:

- Rafiqul Islam Chandpuri (1934–2021), Bangladeshi educator and writer
- M. Rafiqul Islam, Bangladeshi academician and writer
- Rafiqul Islam (scientist) (1936–2018), Bangladeshi physician and medical scientist
- Rafiq Azad (Rafiqul Islam Khan, 1942–2016), Bangladeshi poet
- Rafiqul Islam (Bangladeshi politician) (born 1943), Bangladesh Awami League politician and minister
- Rafiqul Islam (activist) (1950–2013), Bangladeshi activist
- Rafikul Islam Dinajpuri (born 1956), West Bengali politician, social worker and farmer
- Md Rafiqul Islam, Bangladesh Army Major General and former Director General of Border Guards Bangladesh
- Rafiqul Islam Miah, Bangladesh Nationalist Party politician and minister
- Rafiqul Islam Chowdhury (died 2008), Bangladeshi academic and political scientist
- Mohammad Rafiqul Islam (1952–2026), chief of Bangladesh Air Force
- Muhammad Rafiqul Islam, Bangladesh Army major general
- Rafiqul Islam (Indian politician) (born 1973), Indian politician
- Mohammad Rafiqul Islam Khan (born 1977), cricketer from Rajshahi
- Rafiqul Islam (civil servant) (born 1955), incumbent Election Commissioner of Bangladesh
- Kazi Rafiqul Islam, Bangladeshi politician from Bogra
- Rafiqul Islam (footballer) (born 2004), Bangladeshi footballer
- Rafikul Islam Mondal, West Bengali politician
- Rafiqul Islam (general) (1956–2009), Bangladesh Army major general

== See also ==
- Rafiq
- Islam (name)
