= Mir Mushfiqur Rahman =

Lt. General of the Bangladesh Army

Mir Mushfiqur Rahman BSP, SUP
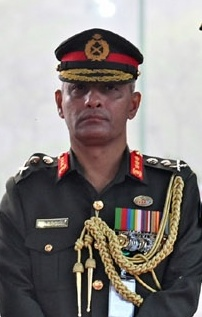
- Rahman in 2026

Principal Staff Officer of Armed Forces Division
- Incumbent
- Assumed office 22 February 2026
- President: Mohammed Shahabuddin; Hafiz Uddin Ahmad (acting); Mirza Fakhrul Islam Alamgir
- Prime Minister: Tarique Rahman
- Preceded by: S. M. Kamrul Hassan

Personal details
- Education: Bangladesh Military Academy; Defence Services Command and Staff College; Joint Services Command and Staff College; Command and General Staff College; National Defence College
- Awards: Sena Utkorsho Padak(SUP); Bishishto Seba Padak (BSP)

Military service
- Allegiance: Bangladesh
- Branch/service: Bangladesh Army
- Years of service: 21 June 1991 - present
- Rank: Lieutenant General
- Unit: East Bengal Regiment
- Commands: Principal Staff Officer at the Armed Forces Division; GOC of 24th Infantry Division; Military Secretary at Army Headquarters; Director General of Directorate General of Defence Purchase; Commander of 44th Infantry Brigade; Commander of 203rd Infantry Brigade; CO of 23rd Bangladesh Infantry Regiment
- Battles/wars: UNMISS; MINUSMA

Mir Mushfiqur Rahman (Note: Bengali: মীর মুশফিকুর রহমান) (Note: BSP, SUP, ndc, psc) is a three-star general of the Bangladesh Army and incumbent Principal Staff Officer of the Armed Forces Division. Prior to that, he was general officer commanding of 24th Infantry Division and area commander, Chittagong area. He is also the former director general of the Directorate General of Defence Purchase and military secretary at army headquarters.

== Education ==
Rahman completed his SSC at Dhanmondi Govt. Boys' High School and HSC at Dhaka Residential Model College. He is a graduate of both the Defence Services Command and Staff College in Mirpur and Command and General Staff College at Fort Leavenworth. He completed his National Defence Course from the National Defence College in Mirpur.

He has completed training courses such as Company Commanders’ Course in Malaysia, Overseas Directing Staff Course at Joint Services Command and Staff College in Shrivenham (UK), Defence Attache Orientation Course at Sri Lanka and Contingent Commanders’ Course in Nepal. He obtained his bachelor's degree in chemistry from University of Chittagong and holds two master's degrees in Defence Studies and Security and Development.

== Military career ==
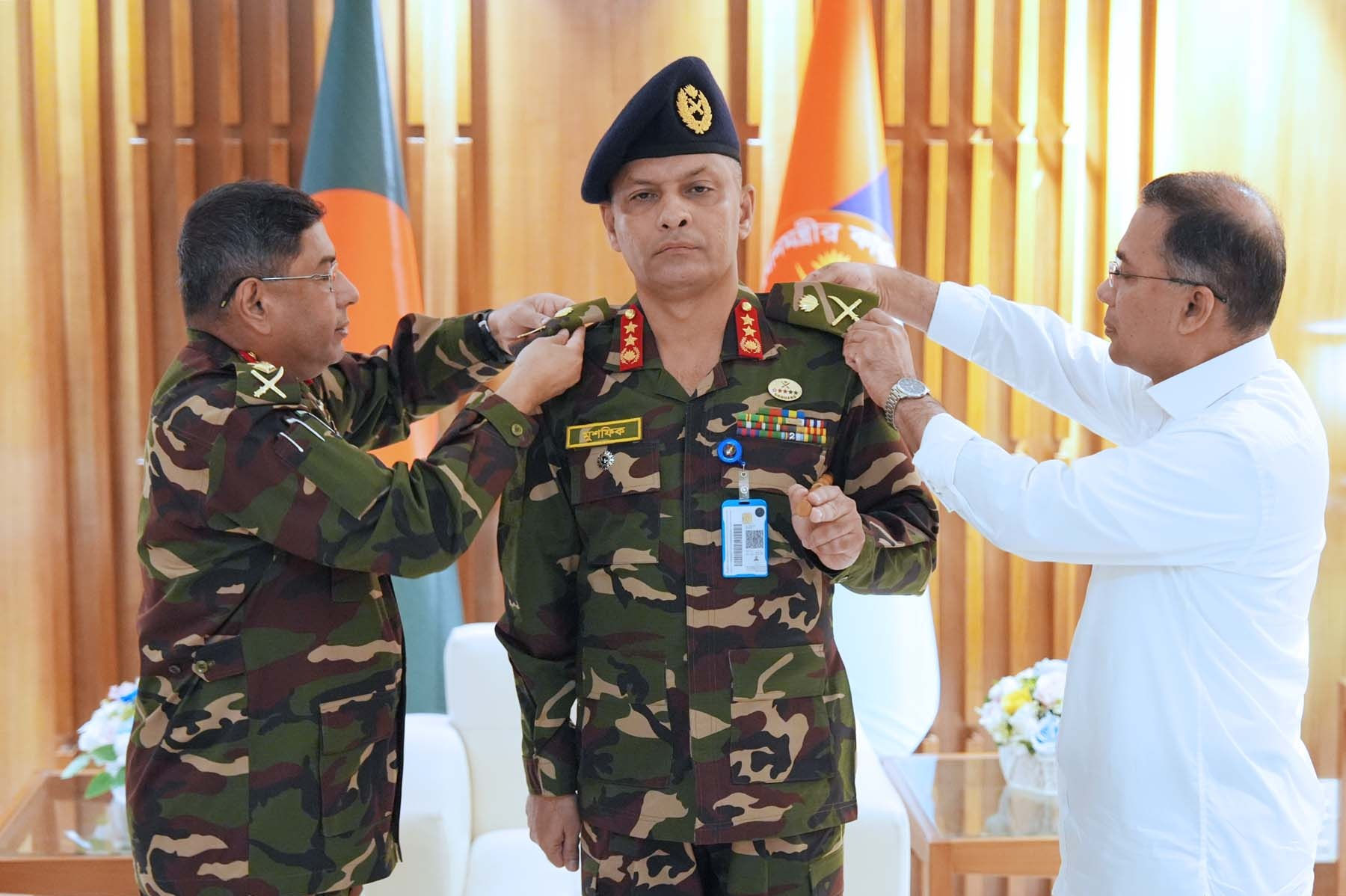
Mir Mushfiqur Rahman being promoted to lieutenant general, c. February 2026

Rahman commanded two infantry companies, among which was deployed in Kuwait after the Gulf War and one infantry battalion, the 23rd Bangladesh Infantry Regiment at Cumilla respectively.

Rahman also instructed at the School of Infantry and Tactics as major and Defence Services Command and Staff College, Army War Game Center as colonel. He was promoted to brigadier general in 2015 and was posted as commander of 44th infantry brigade in Cumilla. Rahman also served as chief of doctrine division at ARTDOC headquarters, Momenshahi in 2017 and commander of 203rd infantry brigade at Khagrachhari in 2019.

Rahman was promoted to major general on 16 January 2023 and was appointed as director general of Directorate General of Defence Purchase. He then tenured as military secretary at army headquarters in July 2024. He was appointed as general officer commanding of 24th Infantry Division and area commander Chittagong area, succeeding his colleague major general Mainur Rahman in October 2024. In February 2026, Rahman was promoted to lieutenant general and appointed as the principal staff officer at the Armed Forces Division succeeding lieutenant general Kamrul Hassan.

=== United Nations peacekeeping missions ===
Rahman served in United Nations peacekeeping missions twice. First, under UNSC as a pioneer commanding officer of BANBAT-10 in UNMISS in South Sudan from 2011 to 2012 and received citations by SRSG for outstanding performance. He again served as force commander of Bangladesh contingent at MINUSMA in Mali from 2015 to 2016.
