= Chief of the General Staff (Bangladesh) =

Bangladesh Army appointment

- চীফ অব জেনারেল স্টাফ
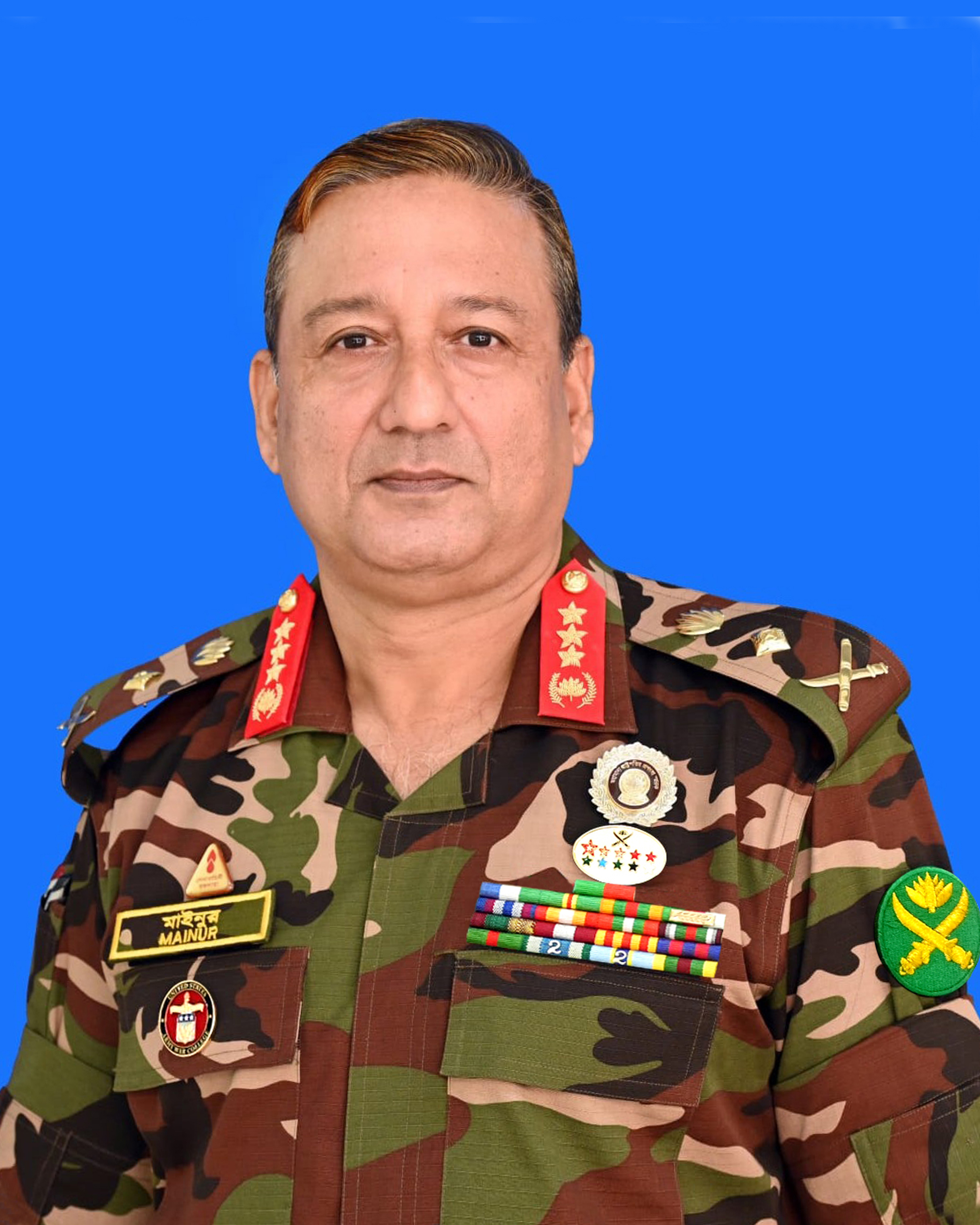
- Incumbent; Lieutenant General; Muhammad Mainur Rahman since 23 February 2026
- Bangladesh Army
- Type: Army staff officer
- Abbreviation: CGS
- Member of: National Committee on Security Affairs
- Reports to: Chief of Army Staff
- Seat: Army Headquarters
- Appointer: Prime Minister; Chief of Army Staff
- Constituting instrument: The Army Act, 1952 of (Act No. XXXIX OF 1952)
- Formation: 21 January 1973
- First holder: Brigadier General; Khaled Mosharraf

The Chief of the General Staff (CGS) (Note: Bengali: চীফ অব জেনারেল স্টাফ) of the Bangladesh Army is a senior military officer in the army headquarters who oversees the operational reports of the military. CGS is one of the four principal staff officers who assist the chief of army staff along with the adjutant general, the quartermaster general, and the master general of ordnance of the army.

== Appointees ==
The following table chronicles the appointees, to the office of the Chief of the General Staff of the Army after the independence war of Bangladesh.

No.	Picture	Chief of the General Staff	Took office	Left office	Time in office	Unit	Ref.
1	Khaled Mosharraf	Brigadier General; Khaled Mosharraf (1937–1975)	21 January 1973	3 November 1975	2 years, 286 days	East Bengal Regiment	–
2	Mir Shawkat Ali	Major General; Mir Shawkat Ali (1938–2010)	4 November 1975	4 October 1977	1 year, 334 days	East Bengal Regiment	–
3	M A Manzur	Major General; M A Manzur (1940–1981)	4 October 1977	12 December 1980	3 years, 69 days	East Bengal Regiment	–
4	Nuruddin Khan	Major General; Nuruddin Khan (born 1940)	17 December 1980	1985	5 years	Corps of Engineers	–
5	Muhammad Mahbubur Rahman	Major General; Muhammad Mahbubur Rahman (born 1945)	1995	1996	1 year	Corps of Engineers	–
6	Hasan Mashhud Chowdhury	Major General; Hasan Mashhud Chowdhury (born 1948)	1997	2000	3 years	Frontier Force Regiment	
7	Ikramul Haque	Major General; Ikramul Haque	2002	2004	2 years	East Bengal Regiment	
8	Moeen U Ahmed	Major General; Moeen U Ahmed (born 1953)	2004	15 June 2005	1 year	East Bengal Regiment	–
9	Iqbal Karim Bhuiyan	Major General; Iqbal Karim Bhuiyan (born 1957)	23 December 2005	23 July 2007	1 year, 212 days	East Bengal Regiment	
10	Sina Ibn Jamali	Lieutenant General; Sina Ibn Jamali (born 1957)	23 July 2007	1 May 2009	1 year, 282 days	East Bengal Regiment	
11	Abdul Hafiz	Lieutenant General; Abdul Hafiz (born 1957)	1 May 2009	24 May 2010	1 year, 19 days	East Bengal Regiment	
12	Mainul Islam	Lieutenant General; Mainul Islam (born 1959)	24 May 2010	30 June 2015	5 years, 37 days	East Bengal Regiment	
13	Sabbir Ahmed	Lieutenant General; Sabbir Ahmed (born 1963)	5 August 2015	16 February 2017	1 year, 195 days	East Bengal Regiment	
14	Muhammad Nazimuddin	Lieutenant General; Muhammad Nazimuddin (born 1960)	16 February 2017	28 July 2018	1 year, 162 days	East Bengal Regiment	
15	Shafiqur Rahman	Lieutenant General; Shafiqur Rahman (born 1962)	28 July 2018	13 January 2021	2 years, 169 days	East Bengal Regiment	
16	Sarwar Hasan	Lieutenant General; Sarwar Hasan (born 1966)	13 January 2021	30 December 2023	2 years, 351 days	Bangladesh Infantry Regiment	
17	Waker-Uz-Zaman	Lieutenant General; Waker-Uz-Zaman (born 1966)	30 December 2023	22 June 2024	175 days	East Bengal Regiment	
18	Mohammad Shaheenul Haque	Lieutenant General; Mohammad Shaheenul Haque (born 1969)	22 june 2024	6 August 2024	45 days	East Bengal Regiment	
19	Mizanur Rahman Shamim	Lieutenant General; Mizanur Rahman Shamim (born 1968)	6 August 2024	17 January 2026	1 year, 164 days	Bangladesh Infantry Regiment	
20	Muhammad Mainur Rahman	Lieutenant General; Muhammad Mainur Rahman (born 1968)	23 February 2026	Present	207 days	East Bengal Regiment	

== See also ==
- Deputy Chief of Army Staff
