= Principal Staff Officer of Armed Forces Division =

Principal Staff Officer
- সশস্ত্র বাহিনী বিভাগের প্রধান স্টাফ অফিসার
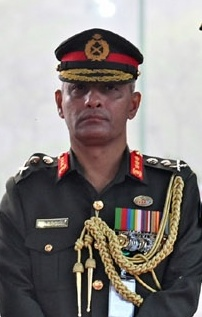
- Incumbent; Lieutenant General Mir Mushfiqur Rahman since 22 February 2026
- Armed Forces Division
- Type: Chief of Defence of the Bangladesh Armed Forces
- Abbreviation: PSO
- Member of: National Committee on Security Affairs
- Reports to: President; Prime Minister
- Residence: Dhaka Cantonment
- Seat: Dhaka Cantonment
- Appointer: Prime Minister
- Salary: Senior Secretary
- Website: AFD Official Website

The Principal Staff Officer (PSO) is the head of the Armed Forces Division (AFD) of the Bangladesh Armed Forces, which operates under the direct supervision of the Prime Minister's Office. The PSO is the principal military advisor to the Prime Minister of Bangladesh on military matters pertaining to all three branches of the armed forces (Bangladesh Army, Bangladesh Navy, and Bangladesh Air Force) and is the head of the Joint Coordinating Headquarters. The PSO holds the rank of Lieutenant General. The position is the institutional equivalent to a Senior Secretary of the Government of Bangladesh.

== List of PSOs ==
Portrait	Name (Birth–Death)	Term of office			Head of government	Ref.
Portrait	Name (Birth–Death)	Took office	Left office	Time in office	Head of government	Ref.
	Lieutenant General; Md Mahfuzur Rahman (born 1961)	1 February 2016	23 November 2020	4 years, 298 days	Sheikh Hasina	
	Lieutenant General; Waker-uz-Zaman (born 1966)	24 November 2020	28 December 2023	3 years, 35 days	Sheikh Hasina	
	Lieutenant General; Mizanur Rahman Shamim (born 1968)	29 December 2023	6 August 2024	221 days	Sheikh Hasina	
	Lieutenant General; S. M. Kamrul Hassan	22 August 2024	22 February 2026	1 year, 186 days	Muhammad Yunus; Tarique Rahman	
	Lieutenant General; Mir Mushfiqur Rahman	22 February 2026	Incumbent	211 days	Tarique Rahman	

== See also ==
- Principal Staff Officer
- Armed Forces Division
- Prime Minister's Office (Bangladesh)
- Chief of Army Staff (Bangladesh)
