= S. M. Shafiuddin Ahmed =

Former (17th) Army Chief of Bangladesh

Shafiuddin Ahmed SBP, OSP
- শফিউদ্দিন আহমেদ
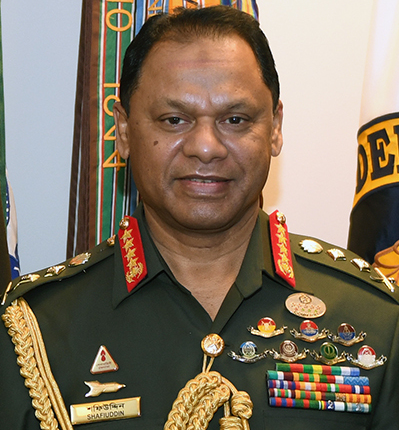
- Shafiuddin in 2022

17th Chief of Army Staff
- In office 24 June 2021 – 23 June 2024
- President: Abdul Hamid; Mohammed Shahabuddin
- Prime Minister: Sheikh Hasina
- Preceded by: Aziz Ahmed
- Succeeded by: Waker-Uz-Zaman

Personal details
- Born: 1 December 1963 (age 62) Narail, East Pakistan, Pakistan
- Spouse: Noorjahan Ahmed
- Education: Bangladesh Military Academy; Bangladesh University of Professionals; University of Dhaka; Defence Services Command and Staff College; PLA National Defence University; National Defense University
- Awards: Senabahini Padak (SBP); Oshamanno Sheba Padak(OSP); Independence Day Award

Military service
- Allegiance: Bangladesh
- Branch/service: Bangladesh Army
- Years of service: 1983–2024
- Rank: General
- Unit: East Bengal Regiment
- Commands: Quartermaster general at Army Headquarters; GOC of ARTDOC; Area Commander of Logistics Area; Senior Directing Staff (Army-1) of National Defence College; Director General of Bangladesh Institute of International and Strategic Studies; GOC of 19th Infantry Division; Commander of 52nd Infantry Brigade
- Battles/wars: Chittagong Hill Tracts conflict; ONUMOZ; MINUSCA
- Service number: BA-2496

Sheikh Mohammad Shafiuddin Ahmed (Note: Bengali: শেখ মোহাম্মদ শফিউদ্দিন আহমেদ) (Note: SBP, OSP, ndc, psc, PhD) (born 1 December 1963) is a retired Bangladeshi four star general who was chief of army staff of the Bangladesh Army. He served as the quartermaster general and director of military training at the Bangladesh Army Headquarters. He also served as director general of Bangladesh Institute of International and Strategic Studies, and commanded an infantry brigade and furthermore an infantry division.

== Early life and education ==
Ahmed was born on 1 December 1963 into a Bengali Muslim family of Sheikhs in the village of Karfa in Lohagara subdivision of Narail Upazila, then in Jessore District of East Pakistan. His father, Sheikh Mohammad Rokon Uddin Ahmed was a professor of Khulna Polytechnic Institute whom participated in Bangladesh Liberation War.

Ahmed finished high school from Jhenidah Cadet College. Soon after, he was commissioned in the 4th East Bengal Regiment of Bangladesh Army on 23 December 1983 in the 9th BMA Long Course. He also graduated from Defence Services Command and Staff College, attended International Symposium Course and Defence and Strategic Studies Course in PLA National Defence University and furthermore obtained post graduate degrees from National Defense University, Washington DC. He attained three master's degrees which focuses on defence studies (MDS) from National University, Bangladesh, Master of Business Administration (MBA) from University of Dhaka and was awarded Master of Philosophy (MPhil) on development of security studies from Bangladesh University of Professionals. He completed his PhD degree on development of security studies from Bangladesh University of Professionals on 28 August 2021.

== Military career ==
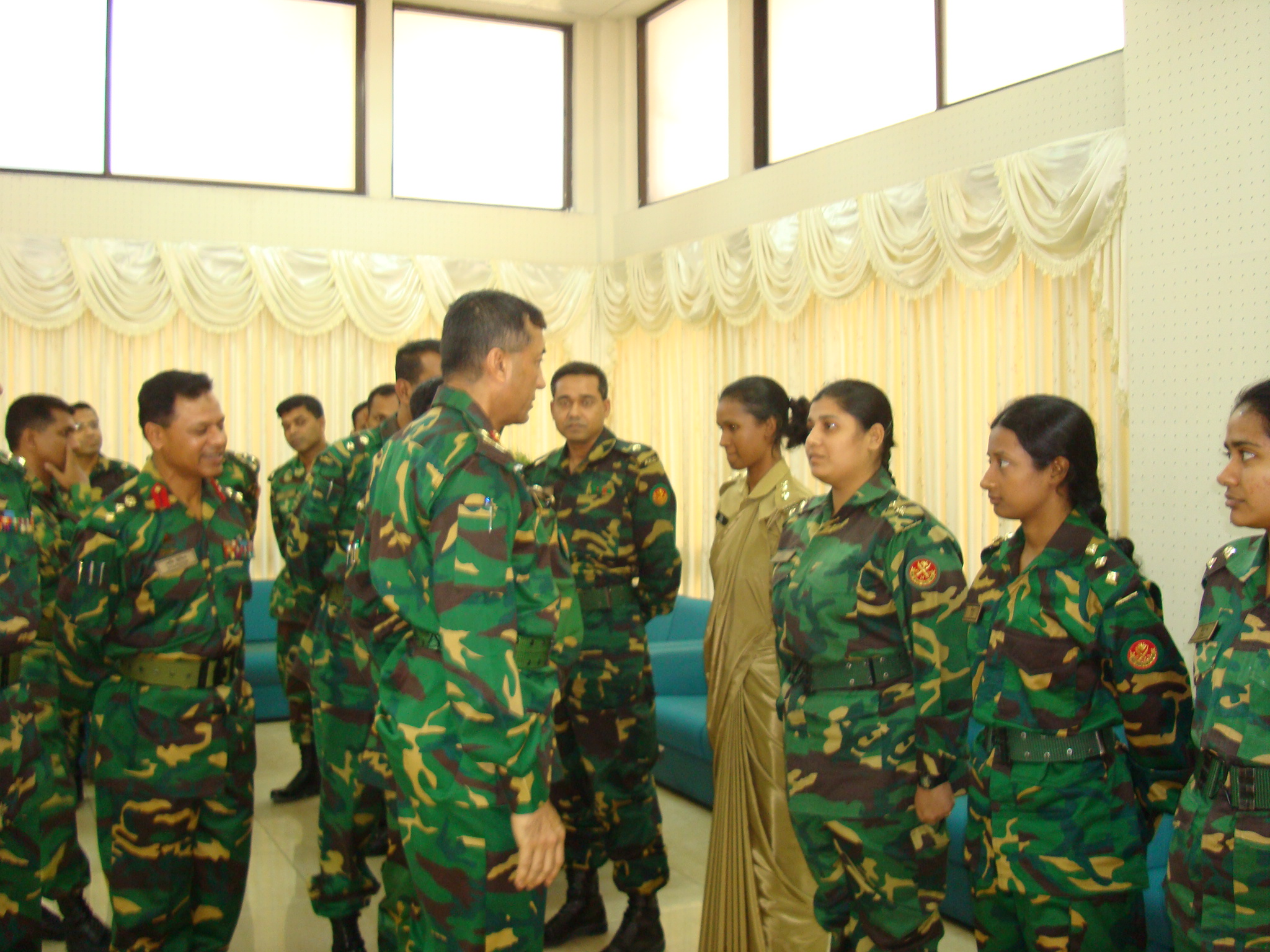
Colonel Ahmed (left) with then general officer commanding of ARTDOC, Major General Ziaur Rahman at the Bangladesh Military Academy on 2008.

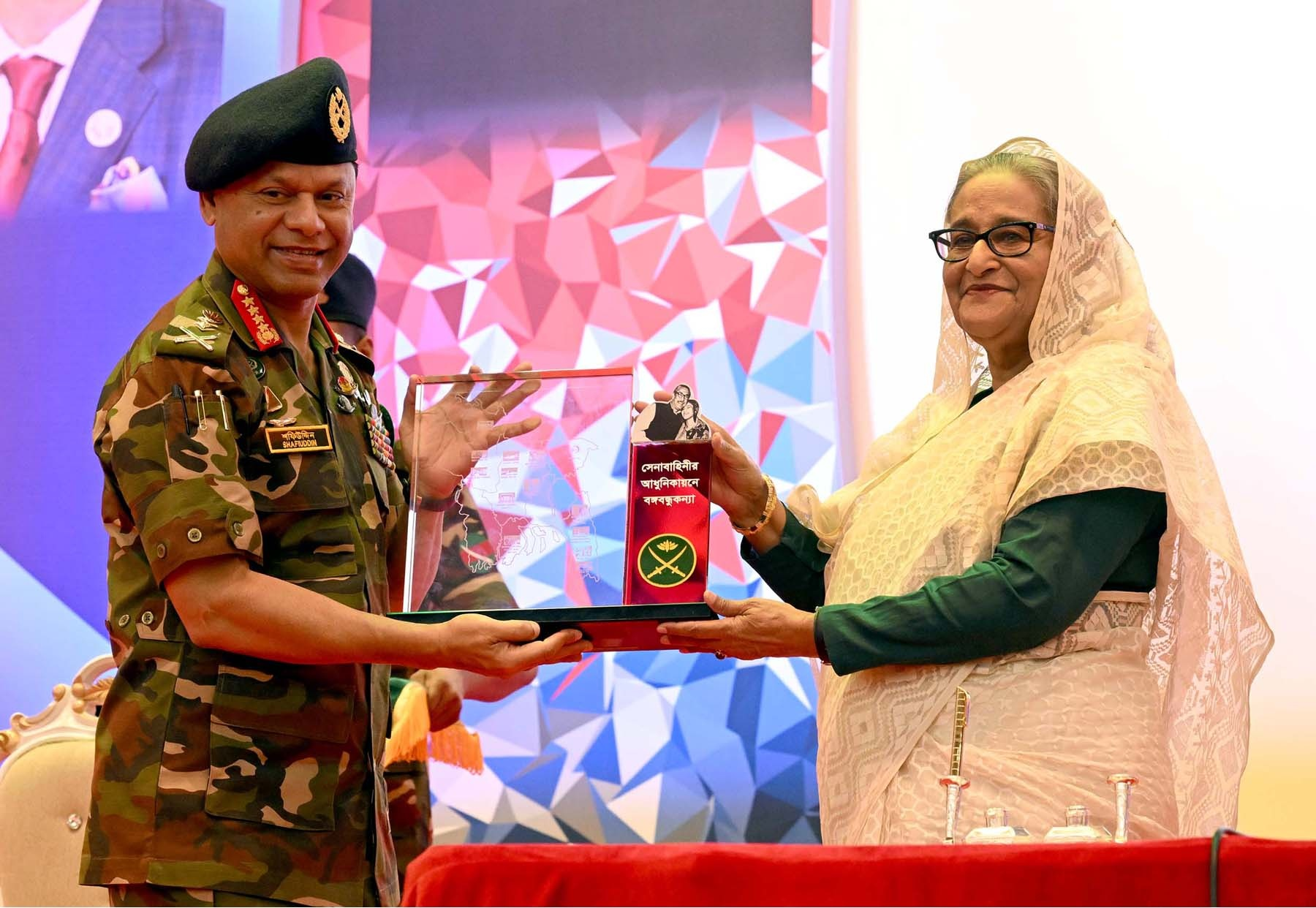
General Ahmed presenting a commemorative memento to Prime minister Sheikh Hasina on 2024.

After commission, Ahmed started his military career in the counter-insurgency operation area of Chittagong Hill Tracts. He served as battalion commander at Bangladesh Military Academy, and commanded one infantry battalion and also a military police unit. As brigadier general, Ahmed commanded an infantry brigade and served as the director of military training at the general staff branch of army headquarters. He was ameliorated to major general in 2012 and appointed as general officer commanding 19th infantry division and area commander Ghatail Area. Ahmed also served as doctrine commander at Bangladesh Institute of International and Strategic Studies as the director general, National Defence College as the senior directing staff and furthermore commander of logistics area.

On 25 August 2019, he was promoted to lieutenant general and made the general officer commanding of ARTDOC. He was appointed as the 6th colonel commandant of Corps of Military Police on 19 October 2020 making him the first three-star general to uphold the position. In December 2020, he was reassigned to army headquarters and designated as quartermaster general of the Bangladesh Army, succeeding him by lieutenant general Matiur Rahman at ARTDOC.

=== United Nations peacekeeping missions ===
Ahmed served in United Nations peacekeeping twice. First, under UNSC in Mozambique, he served in ONUMOZ from 1993 to 1994. Then again as a deputy force commander of MINUSCA in the Central African Republic from 2014 to 2016 and received citations by SRSG for outstanding performance.

=== As chief of army staff ===
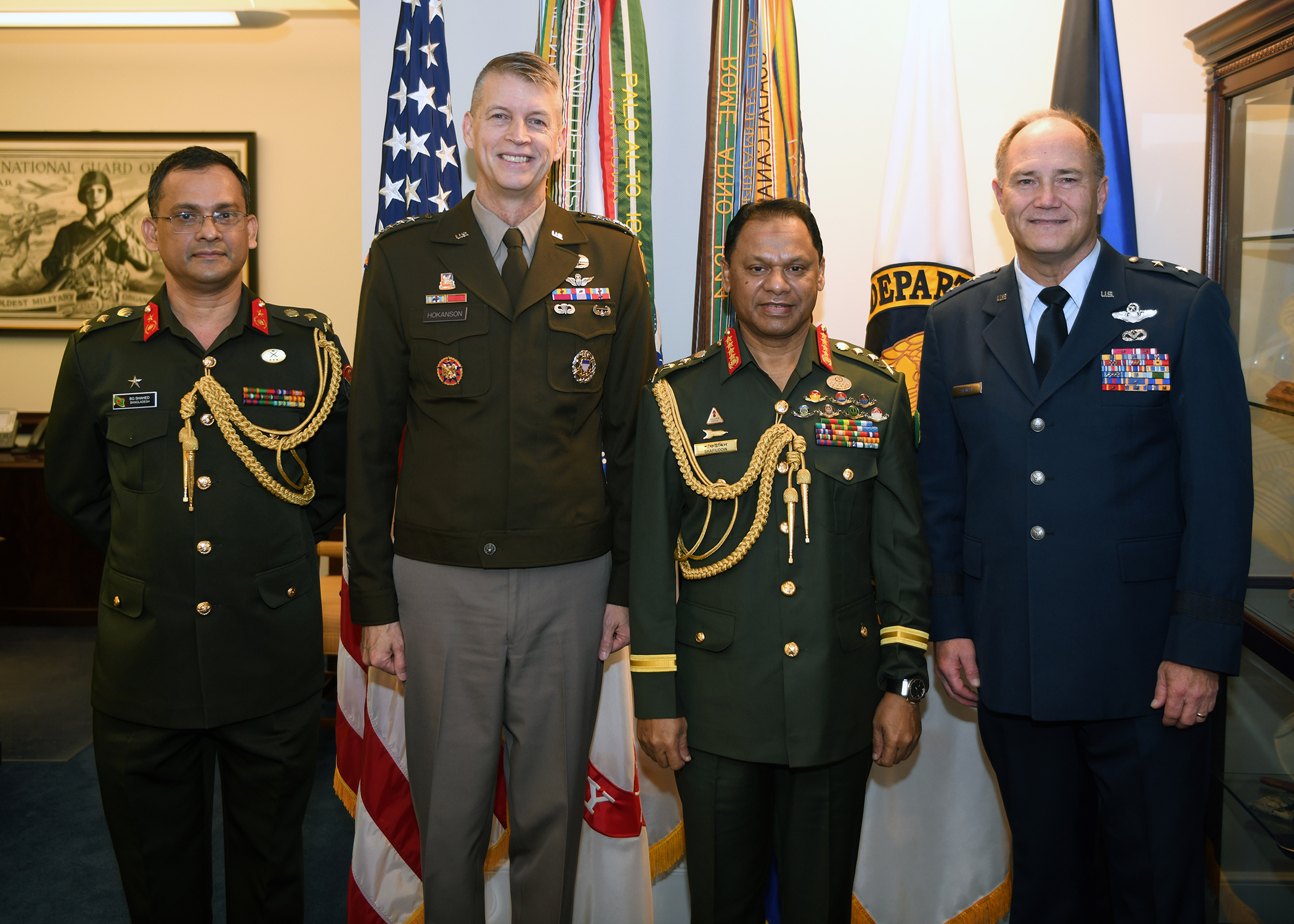
General Ahmed with then Director of Army National Guard General Daniel R. Hokanson and former adjutant general of Oregon National Guard Major General Michael E. Stencel at the Pentagon on 20 April 2022.

On 24 June 2021, Ahmed was upgraded to general and was appointed as 17th chief of army staff succeeding general Aziz Ahmed.

As army chief, Ahmed's other roles include chairing the board of directors of Bangladesh Machine Tools Factory, Bangladesh Diesel Plant Limited, Trust Bank Limited, Army Welfare Trust, and furthermore the boards of trustees of Sena Kalyan Sangstha and the Bangladesh Army University of Engineering & Technology. He was the president of Bangladesh Olympic Association and Bangladesh Golf Federation and also acted as the president of the executive committee of Kurmitola Golf Club. He was also the vice chairman of the governing body of the National Defence College and Defence Services Command & Staff College, Council of the Military Institute of Science and Technology.

As army chief, he visited Turkey to enhance defence cooperation and laid the foundation for further purchases of Turkish weapons. He attended the Shangri-La Dialogue in 2024. After the beginning of the Myanmar Civil War, he asserted that the army was ready to respond to any threats from Myanmar. During the 2024 election, he deployed troops to maintain law and order.

Ahmed went to leave per retirement on 23 June 2024 succeeded by General Waker-Uz-Zaman as chief of army staff. He was the last general of the Fourth Hasina ministry.

== Allegation of role in enforced disappearance ==
Shafiuddin Ahmed has been accused of playing a direct role in a case of enforced disappearance, a phenomenon that became widespread during the rule of Sheikh Hasina.

On 30 September 2024, Barrister M. Sarwar Hossain, a retired major of the Bangladesh Army, lodged an official complaint with the Commission of Inquiry on Enforced Disappearances against Shafiuddin and two other army generals, namely Lieutenant General Mohammad Akbar Hossain and Major General Md Sarwar Hossain, for their alleged roles in his unlawful detention at the headquarters of the Directorate General of Forces Intelligence.

Barrister Sarwar alleged that the officers summoned him at the DGFI headquarters at the false pretext of responding to a legal notice on 27 October 2016 and then pressured him to drop a divorce case involving Shafiuddin’s eldest daughter, in which Barrister Sarwar was representing the husband in civil court. He also stated to journalists that the generals threatened to send him to Aynaghar, a codename for covert military detention centers for dissidents of the Hasina administration whose details became publicly known only after 2022.

He was released after more than eleven hours of detention, but only after providing a written commitment that he would drop the case and not disclose the details of his abduction, the complaint stated.

== Personal life ==
Shafiuddin Ahmed is married to Noorjahan Ahmed, and has two daughters.

=== Allegations against Family Members ===
Wing Commander Md Saifur Rahman Eraj, a helicopter pilot of the Bangladesh Air Force and second husband of Shafiuddin's eldest daughter, was taken into military custody on 28 July 2026 for his alleged role in the enforced disappearance and eventual murder of Bangladesh Nationalist Party leader and former lawmaker M. Ilias Ali.On 6 August 2026, he was produced to the International Crimes Tribunal and shown arrest under the Ilias Ali case.

S. M. Shafiuddin Ahmed hails from a family of active involvement in Awami League politics.

His older sister Runu Reza is a Khulna-based Awami League politician and former lawmaker who entered politics after her husband and central vice chairman of Jubo League Shahid Iqbal Bithar was gunned down in 2010 at the aftermath of party infighting. Runu Reza was later implicated in corruption in relation to usurping government plots during her tenure as an MP.

His older brother S. M. Rafiuddin Ahmed Rafiq is also an Awami League leader and former panel mayor of the Khulna City Corporation. As the interim government launched the Operation Devil Hunt in November 2024 in response to countrywide violence and sabotages by Awami League members following their party's ouster from government by the July Uprising, Rafiuddin was arrested by the joint forces on 30 November 2024 from Khulna metropolitan area for his alleged role in subversive activities. It was subsequently revealed that the International Crimes Tribunal had received two formal complaints against him for his alleged role in the massacre of July protesters, leading to his formal arrest under those charges.

Military offices
Preceded by Aziz Ahmed	Chief of Army Staff; 24 June 2021 – 23 June 2024	Succeeded by Waker-uz-Zaman
