= Bangladesh Golf Federation =

Governing body of golf in Bangladesh

- Formation: 1998
- Headquarters: Dhaka, Bangladesh
- Region served: Bangladesh
- Official language: Bengali
- President: General Waker-Uz-Zaman, OSP, SGP, psc
- Affiliations: Kurmitola Golf Club
- Website: Bangladesh Golf Federation

The Bangladesh Golf Federation is the national federation for golf and is responsible for governing the sport in Bangladesh. Waker-uz-Zaman, Chief of Army Staff of the Bangladesh Army, is the president of Bangladesh Golf Federation. Lieutenant General Mohammad Shaheenul Haque, ndc, hdmc, psc is the senior vice-president and Brigadier General Md Sayeed Siddiki, BSP, awc, psc (retd) is the general secretary of the federation respectively.

== History ==
The Bangladesh Golf Federation was established in 2001. The Bangladesh Golf Federation is associated with the Bangladesh Olympic Association. It is under the National Sports Council of the Ministry of Youth and Sports. The federation has 14 golf clubs associated with it. The clubs associated with it are Army Golf Club, Bangladesh Ordnance Factory Golf Club, Bhatiary Golf and Country Club, Bogra Golf Club, Cox's Bazar Golf and Country Club, Chengi Golf and Country Club, Ghatail Golf Club, Jashore Golf and Country Club, Kurmitola Golf Club, Mainamati Golf and Country Club, Rangpur Golf Club, Shaheen Golf and Country Club and Savar Golf Club.
