= Bangladesh National Authority for Chemical Weapons Convention =

Bangladesh Government Regulatory Agency

- Formation: 2006
- Headquarters: Dhaka, Bangladesh
- Region served: Bangladesh
- Official language: Bengali
- Chairman: Lieutenant General SM Kamrul Hassan
- Parent organization: Armed Forces Division (AFD)
- Website: www.bnacwcafd.gov.bd

The Bangladesh National Authority for Chemical Weapons Convention (Bengali: বাংলাদেশ জাতীয় কর্তৃপক্ষ, রাসায়নিক অস্ত্র কনভেনশন) is a Bangladesh government regulatory agency that ensures he implementation and compliance with Chemical Weapons Convention.

== History ==
On 14 January 1993, Bangladesh signed the Chemical Weapons Convention and ratified on 25 April 1997. On 24 September 2006 Bangladesh National Authority for Chemical Weapons Convention was formed through the passage of Chemical Weapons (Prohibition) Act, 2006. The authority was initially under the Ministry of Foreign Affairs but was later shifted to the Armed Forces Division of the Prime Minister's Office.

On 19 October 2017, the authority organized a two-day conference titled Advanced Chemical Safety and Security Management. The authority facilitates the inspections of Organisation for the Prohibition of Chemical Weapons in Bangladesh.

Its 16th general meeting was held online in 2020 due to the COVID-19 pandemic in Bangladesh.
