= Mohammad Mainul Islam (general) =

Bangladeshi military officer (born 1959)

Mohammad Mainul Islam SBP, OSP
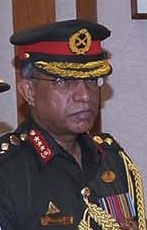
- Mainul in 2015

Principal Staff Officer of Armed Forces Division
- In office 1 July 2015 – 31 January 2016
- President: Abdul Hamid
- Prime Minister: Sheikh Hasina
- Preceded by: Belal Shafiul Haque
- Succeeded by: Mahfuzur Rahman

17th Director General of Bangladesh Rifles
- In office 28 February 2009 – 10 May 2010
- President: Zillur Rahman
- Prime Minister: Sheikh Hasina
- Preceded by: Shakil Ahmed
- Succeeded by: Rafiqul Islam

Personal details
- Born: 4 December 1959 (age 66) Nilphamari, East Pakistan, Pakistan
- Relations: Atiqul Islam (brother); Tafazzul Islam (brother)
- Education: Bangladesh University of Professionals
- Awards: Senabahini Padak(SBP); Oshamanno Sheba Padak(OSP); Independence Day Award

Military service
- Allegiance: Bangladesh
- Branch/service: Bangladesh Army; Bangladesh Rifles
- Years of service: 1977–2016
- Rank: Lieutenant General
- Unit: East Bengal Regiment
- Commands: PSO of Armed Forces Division; Chief of General Staff of Bangladesh Army; Director General of Bangladesh Rifles; Commander of 46th Independent Infantry Brigade
- Battles/wars: Chittagong Hill Tracts conflict; UNOCI; UNIIMOG

Mohammad Mainul Islam SBP, OSP, psc (born 4 December 1959) is a retired lieutenant general of the Bangladesh Army. He is the former principal staff officer of the Armed Forces Division and chief of general staff (CGS) of the Bangladesh Army. He also served as director general of Bangladesh Rifles (BDR), later renamed as Border Guard Bangladesh (BGB). He is currently the president of the Bangladesh Archery Federation.

== Education ==
Mainul was commissioned from Bangladesh Military Academy in the East Bengal Regiment in 1977. Mainul completed his master's degree in strategic studies in 2003 from United States Army War College, Pennsylvania. He did his second master's in business studies in 2004 from The Trinity University, in the United States. He also completed his third master's in defence studies in 2005 from National University. As of 2020, he is pursuing a PhD under Bangladesh University of Professionals.

== Career ==
=== Bangladesh Army ===
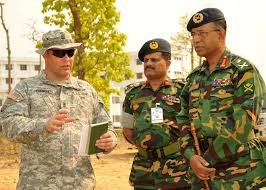
General Mainul Islam examining a joint military exercise

Mainul instructed at East Bengal Regimental Centre, School of Infantry and Tactics and was the chief instructor of Armed Forces War College. He commanded one infantry company, one infantry battalion and the 46th Independent Infantry Brigade. He was appointed as director general of Bangladesh Rifles and rechristened it to Border Guard Bangladesh on 4 May 2010.

Mainul then returned to National Defence College as college secretary. He was promoted to lieutenant general in 2013 and was made chief of general Staff at the Army Headquarters. In July 2015, he was made the principal staff officer of the Armed Forces Division. He was a part of modernization of the Bangladesh Armed Forces as part of Forces Goal 2030 scheme. Mainul went to leave per retirement in February 2016.

=== Bangladesh Rifles ===
He was hand picked as brigadier general to manage the catastrophic situation of the 2009 Bangladesh Rifles Mutiny. He served as the director general of the Bangladesh Rifles from 28 February 2009 to 9 May 2010 and was given the responsibility of reorganizing the mutiny devastated force. He had replaced Director General Shakil Ahmed who was killed in the mutiny. He re-established the chain of command in the force and initiated the trial of the mutiny in a very short time. He transformed working environment of the traditional border force with new laws and positive culture. He oversaw the change in name of Bangladesh Rifles to Border Guards Bangladesh. During his directorship, the uniform was changed and an intelligence unit was added to the border forces. He produced a new organisational structure upon which the force operates today.

=== United Nations ===
After forced withdrawal of Bangladesh Battalion Headquarters from UN camps in Ivory Coast, Bangladeshi peacekeepers faced image crisis; by negative branding like "armed tourists" in the mission area. He was assigned to bring change in ways of professional peace keeping duty. He could turn the tide in favor of Bangladeshi peace keepers. He was also a proud member of 1st milestone group of 15 Peace Keepers deployed under United Nations Iran–Iraq Military Observer Group (UNIMOG) to Iraq in 1988, immediately after Iraq-Iran War. This group paved the way of present-day peace keeping.
