= Waker-Uz-Zaman =

Chief of Army Staff of the Bangladesh Army

Waqar-Uz-Zaman SBP, OSP, SGP
- ওয়াকার-উজ-জামান
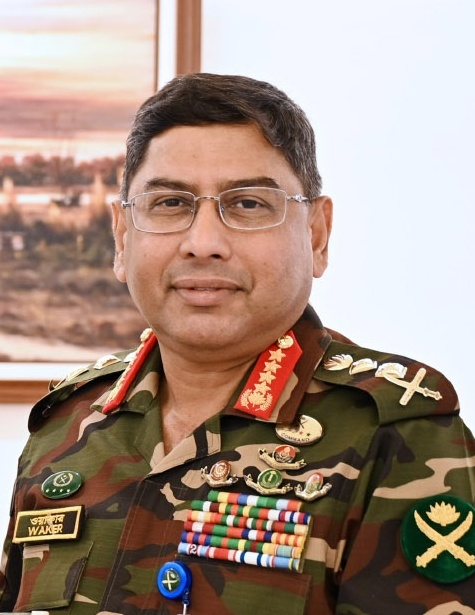
- Waker in 2026

18th Chief of Army Staff
- Incumbent
- Assumed office 23 June 2024
- President: Mohammed Shahabuddin; Hafiz Uddin Ahmad (acting); Mirza Fakrul Islam Alamgir
- Prime Minister: Sheikh Hasina; Muhammad Yunus (acting); Tarique Rahman
- Preceded by: Shafiuddin Ahmed

Chief of General Staff
- In office 30 December 2023 – 22 June 2024
- President: Mohammed Shahabuddin
- Prime Minister: Sheikh Hasina
- Preceded by: Ataul Hakim Sarwar Hasan
- Succeeded by: Mohammad Shaheenul Haque

Principal Staff Officer of Armed Forces Division
- In office 24 November 2020 – 29 December 2023
- President: Abdul Hamid; Mohammed Shahabuddin
- Prime Minister: Sheikh Hasina
- Preceded by: Mahfuzur Rahman
- Succeeded by: Mizanur Rahman Shamim

Personal details
- Born: 16 September 1966 (age 60) Dacca, East Pakistan, Pakistan (now Bangladesh)
- Spouse: Begum Sarahnaz Kamalika Rahman
- Relations: Mustafizur Rahman (father-in-law)
- Children: 2
- Education: Bangladesh Military Academy; Defence Services Command and Staff College; Joint Services Command and Staff College; King's College London
- Awards: Senabahini Padak (SBP); Oshamanno Sheba Padak (OSP); Sena Gourab Padak (SGP)

Military service
- Allegiance: Bangladesh
- Branch/service: Bangladesh Army
- Years of service: 1985–present Service number BA-2902
- Rank: General
- Unit: East Bengal Regiment
- Commands: Chief of Army Staff; Chief of General Staff; Principal Staff Officer of Armed Forces Division; Military Secretary at Army Headquarters; GOC of 9th Infantry Division; Commander of 46th Independent Infantry Brigade
- Battles/wars: UNMIL; I UNAVEM

General Waker-Uz-Zaman (Note: Bengali: ওয়াকার-উজ-জামান) (Note: SBP, OSP, SGP, psc) (born 16 September 1966) is a four-star general of the Bangladesh Army and the current Chief of Army Staff. Earlier, he served as the Chief of General Staff at Army Headquarters and as the 15th Principal Staff Officer of the Armed Forces Division. (Note: Multiple references:)

Just over a month of his tenure amid the July Uprising, he announced the resignation of Prime Minister Sheikh Hasina on 5 August 2024. (Note: Multiple references:)

== Early life and education ==
Waker was born into a Bengali Muslim family on 16 September 1966 at Dacca of then East Pakistan. Waker's family hailed from Sherpur of now Mymensingh Division, Bangladesh. His father was Asad-Uz-Zaman, a notable district judge of Sherpur and Gaibandha. Waker's paternal grandfather was Fazlur Rahman who was given the title of Khan Bahadur by the erstwhile ruling British Administration for his services to the British Raj and so was his maternal grandfather Sadiq Khan.

He began his educational career as a child from Rajshahi Collegiate School, the oldest educational institution in Bangladesh.

Waker was enlisted to Bangladesh Military Academy (BMA) on 1983 and was commissioned on 20 December 1985 from 13th BMA Long Course in the East Bengal Regiment. Waker is an alumnus of Defence Services Command and Staff College and Joint Services Command and Staff College in the United Kingdom. He obtained two master's degrees in defence studies, one from National University, Bangladesh, and a second from King's College, University of London.

== Military career ==
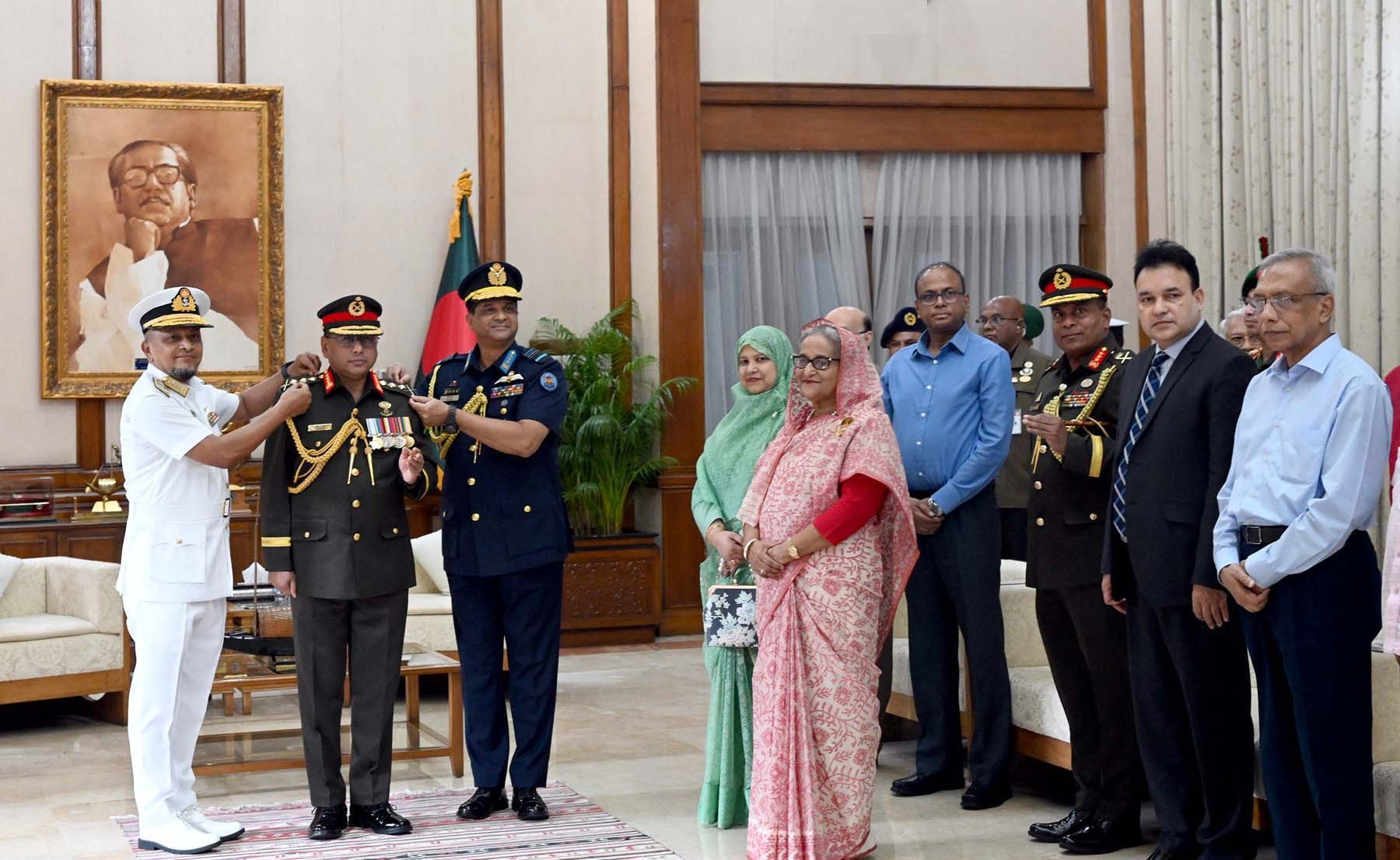
Waker receiving the rank of General at Prime Minister's Office on 23 June 2024.

Waker served as instructor at the Non-Commissioned Officer's Academy in Bogra, School of Infantry and Tactics (Tactics wing) in Sylhet and also in Bangladesh Institute of Peace Support Operation Training. He served in the United Nations Mission in Liberia and United Nations Angola Verification Mission I. As lieutenant colonel, he directed the Army Security Unit at Dhaka Cantonment and commanded the 17th East Bengal Regiment in Momenshahi.

He was promoted to colonel and served as Deputy Assistant Military Secretary in Military Secretary's Branch at Army Headquarters. He was then upgraded to brigadier general and appointed commander of the 46th Independent Infantry Brigade in Dhaka and then as Deputy Military Secretary back at the Army Headquarters. Waker was promoted to major general in 2013 and posted as military secretary at the headquarters.

Furthermore, he was appointed general officer commanding of 9th Infantry Division and area Commander of Savar Area which he served until returning to the headquarters, again as military secretary in 2017. He also had the rare distinction of serving as National Victory Parade Commander three consecutive times.

On 30 November 2020, Waker was promoted to lieutenant general and appointed Principal Staff Officer of Armed Forces Division. He served as the chairperson of Bangladesh National Authority for Chemical Weapons Convention. He was a member of the governing body of the National Defence College. He returned to army headquarters for serving as the Chief of General Staff on 29 December 2023.

=== As Chief of Army Staff ===
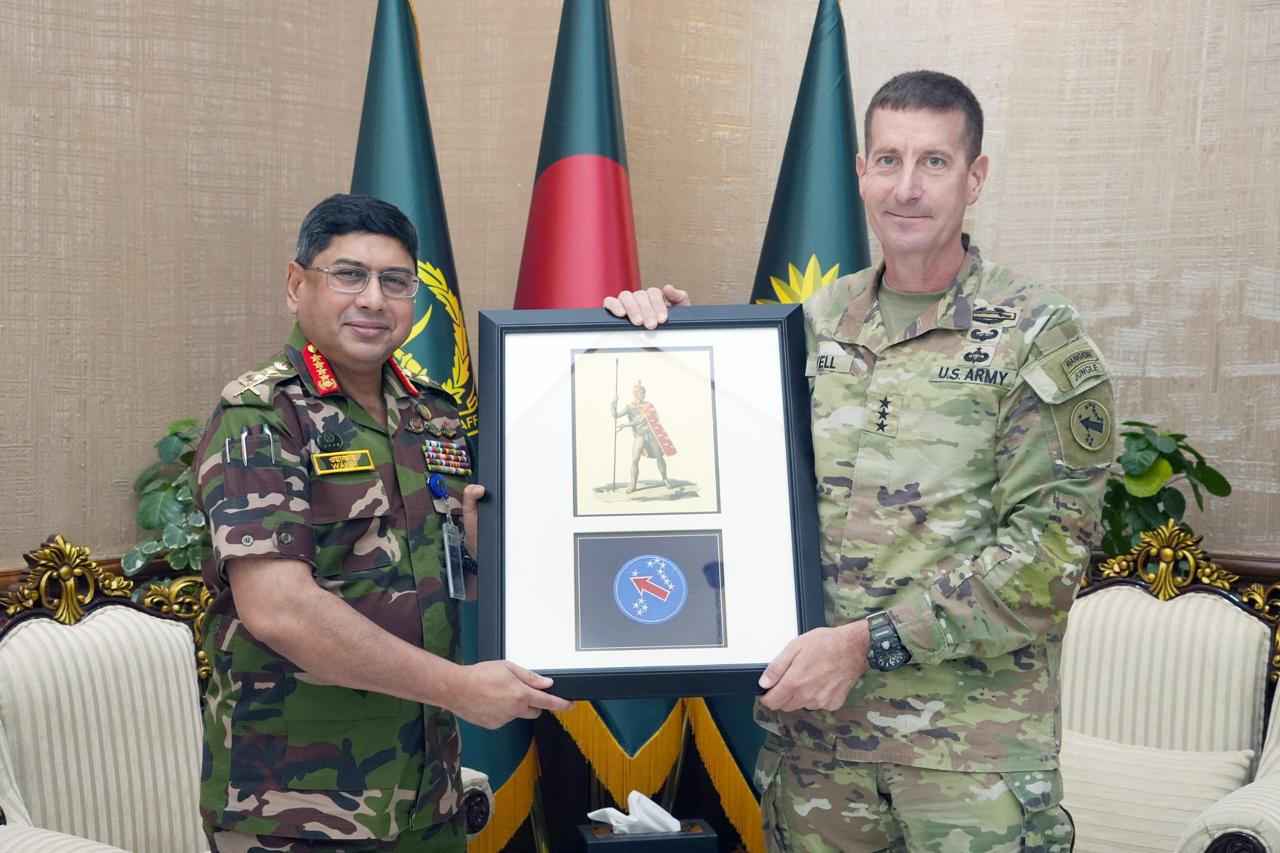
General Waker presenting a framed plaque to United States Army lieutenant general Joel B. Vowell, c. 2026.

On 11 June 2024, Government of Bangladesh appointed Waker as the next army chief. He succeeded General Shafiuddin Ahmed and assumed office on 23 June 2024. He also serves as the Colonel of the Regiment of the East Bengal Regiment and the Bangladesh Infantry Regiment, and as the Colonel Commandant of the Army Service Corps and the Corps of Engineers.

Waker reshuffled the top brass of the military after the overthrow of the Fifth Hasina ministry. This included forcibly retiring and dismissing manifold generals and an admiral from the armed forces. In particular, he removed former director generals of Special Security Force and Directorate General of Forces Intelligence such as lieutenant general Saiful Alam and lieutenant general Mujibur Rahman who were accused of human rights violations.

Regarding enforced disappearances, he affirmed that the army would take action against any army personnel involved. In October 2025, he took 15 senior army officers into custody, for enforced disappearances charges, on behalf of the International Crimes Tribunal.

Waker also took steps to increase strategic cooperation with China. In addition to which, he improved relations with the US and its allies. This included increasing the number of joint military exercises and overall cooperation between the Bangladesh Armed Forces and US Pacific Command. Furthermore, he took steps to strengthen defence ties with Turkey and secure their assistance to grow Bangladesh's domestic military industry.

In September 2025, he attended the Indo-Pacific Army Chiefs Conference in Malaysia. Later, in April 2026, he visited the Defence Services Asia (DSA) and National Security Asia 2026 exhibitions in Malaysia. He also took part in the 8th Putrajaya Forum, as part of an effort to strengthen defence cooperation with ASEAN countries.

In March 2026, he received a special resolution, from the US state of Georgia, in recognition of Bangladesh's significant role in UN peacekeeping missions. It was formally handed over to him, on 31 March 2026, by Georgia State Governor Brian P Kemp, during a session of the Georgia State Senate.

== Interim government support ==
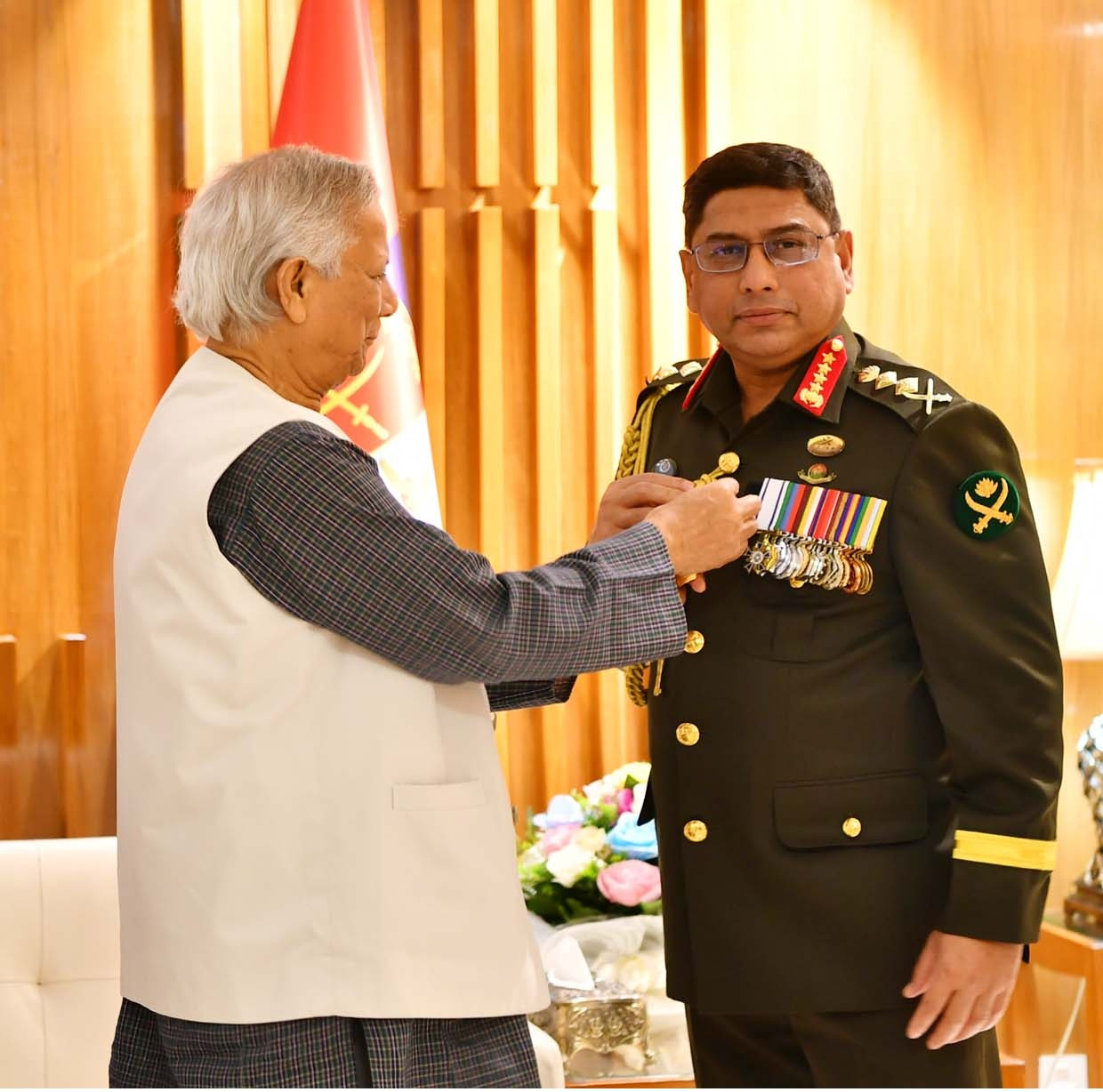
Muhammad Yunus adorns the badge of Senabahini Padak (SBP) to General Waker on 21 November 2024.

On 3 August 2024, Waker held an officer's address to get the opinions of the army regarding the suppression of the ongoing insurrection. Afterwards, he undertook that army personnel will not involve on the act of execution.

On 4 August, he and the other service chiefs advised Hasina to resign. The following day, the army secured the resignation of Hasina at Ganabhaban and escorted her to BAF Base A. K. Khandker in order to abscond her for India. On 5 August 2024, Waker announced that Hasina had resigned and fled Bangladesh to India at the amidst the July Uprising, he announced that an interim government will be formed with the support of the political parties and the protesters, promising that the military would investigate violence against student protesters and hand over power.

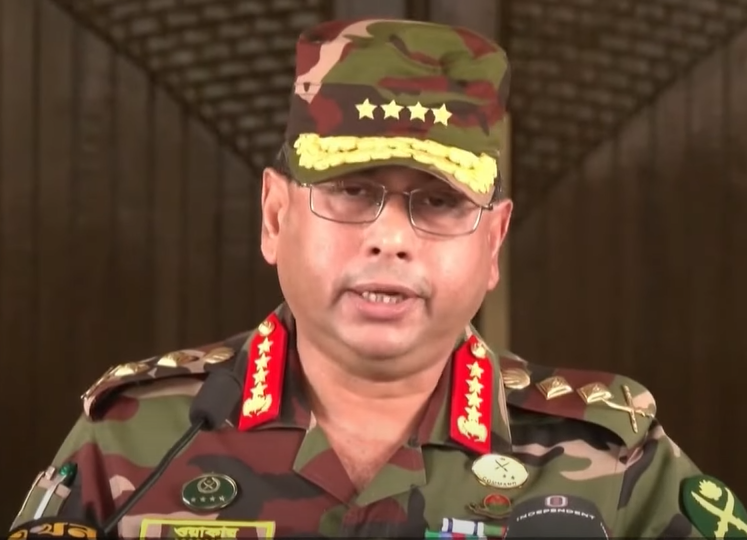
General Waker-Uz-Zaman announcing the end of Sheikh Hasina's long authoritarian rule on 5 August 2024.

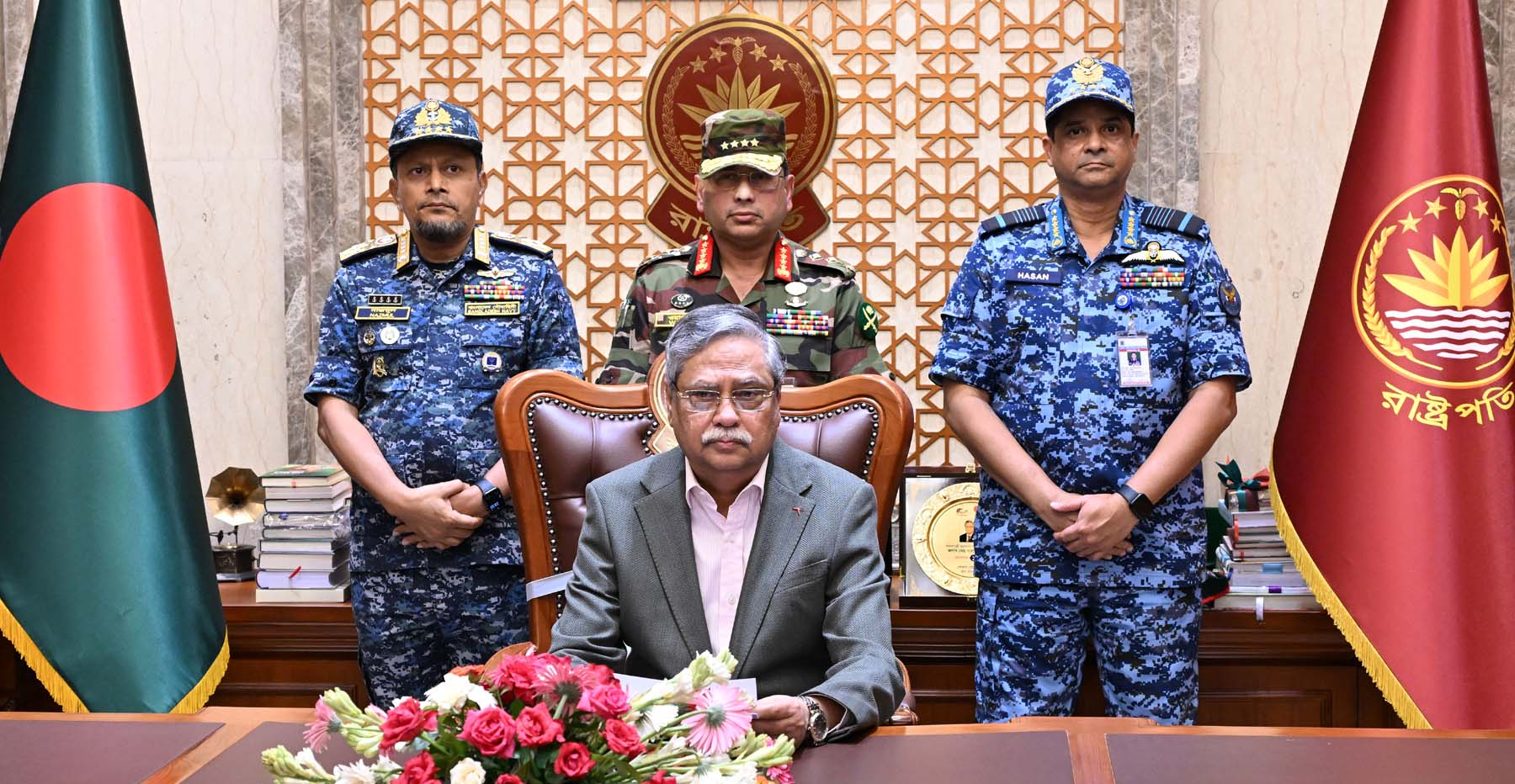
Gen. Waker Uz Zaman along with Chiefs of Bangladesh Armed Forces and President Mohammed Shahabuddin in the aftermath of Sheikh Hasina's resignation on 5 August 2024.

Members of the interim government led by Nobel laureate Muhammad Yunus were sworn in on the night of 8 August, three days after the Fifth Hasina ministry was dissolved following the resignation of Sheikh Hasina and the ousting of her regime. Waker-uz-Zaman oversaw the oath-taking ceremony of Yunus in presence of political leaders, civil society leaders, generals and diplomats. Yunus was declared head of the interim government of Bangladesh, but other attendees that were sworn in to act as Yunus' interim cabinet members were referred to as "advisers" rather than ministers. These new advisers included student protesters, such as, Nahid Islam and Asif Mahmud, whom led the quota reform and the non-cooperation movement culminating in the ousting of Sheikh Hasina.

He hinted that the interim government may have 15 members for instance. However, he did not disclose their names and the possible tenure of the government. He vowed to help and support the interim government to help it complete reforms following the constitutional crisis, and to hold a general election within 18 months.

During the 2026 Bangladeshi general elections, he deployed troops to ensure that the elections were held peacefully.

=== Controversy ===
In March 2025, Hasnat Abdullah and Sarjis Alam alleged Waker of opposing the appointment of Muhammad Yunus as chief advisor after 5 August 2024, and they also claimed that, in March 2025, Waker allegedly secretly argued over a proposal to Hasnat and two other anti-discrimination student movement leaders to bring the Refined Awami League back into Bangladeshi politics without a trial, which led to widespread criticism on social media and the media, as well as reactions in political circles. However, Bangladesh army described Hasnat's assertions as "hilarious and an immature array of stories."

== Personal life ==
Waker is married to Sarahnaz Kamalika Rahman, the eldest daughter of late General Mustafizur Rahman, and the couple has two daughters.

Military offices
Preceded by SM Shafiuddin Ahmed	Chief of Army Staff; 23 June 2024	Incumbent
