= Muhammad Mahfuzur Rahman =

Retired Bangladeshi three-star general

Mahfuzur Rahman OSP, SP
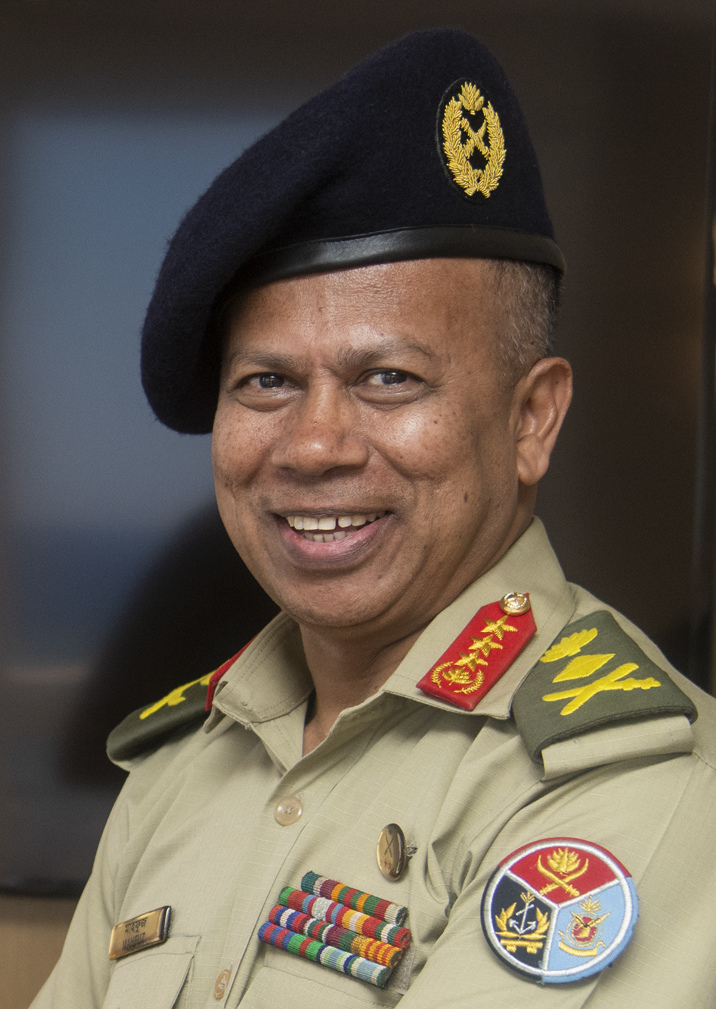
- Rahman in 2018

Principal Staff Officer of Armed Forces Division
- In office 1 February 2016 – 24 November 2020
- President: Abdul Hamid
- Prime Minister: Sheikh Hasina
- Preceded by: Mainul Islam
- Succeeded by: Waker-uz-Zaman

Personal details
- Born: 1 December 1961 (age 64) Rajshahi, East Pakistan, Pakistan
- Education: Military Training Bangladesh Military Academy
- Awards: Oshamanno Sheba Padak(OSP); Independence Day Award

Military service
- Allegiance: Bangladesh
- Branch/service: Bangladesh Army
- Years of service: 1981–2020
- Rank: Lieutenant General
- Unit: East Bengal Regiment
- Commands: Principal Staff Officer of AFD; Adjutant General at Army Headquarters; GOC of 11th Infantry Division; Commandant in Defence Service Command & Staff College; Commandant in School of Infantry and Tactics
- Battles/wars: UNAMSIL; UNOMOZ

Muhammad Mahfuzur Rahman (Note: Bengali: মুহাম্মদ মাহফুজুর রহমান) (Note: OSP, rcds, ndc, afwc, psc, PhD) (born 1 December 1961) is a retired three star general and former principal staff officer of the Armed Forces Division.

== Early life and education ==
He was born on 1 December 1961 in Rajshahi district. He was a cadet of Jhenaidah Cadet College. In 1981 he graduated from Bangladesh Military Academy and was commissioned from the 5th Long Course into the Corps of Infantry. He completed further studies at Staff College and the Armed Forces War Course at Mirpur. He is a former adjutant general at army headquarters.

He is a graduate of Defence Services Command and Staff College and Armed Forces War Course, Mirpur, Bangladesh. He is also an alumnus of National Defence College, India (New Delhi) and Royal College of Defence Studies, UK (London). He completed master's degrees in defence studies (MDS), war studies (MWS), and business administration (MBA). He has also obtained an M.Phil. from Madras University, India, and a PhD from Jahangirnagar University, Bangladesh.

He has edited a book, Indo-Bangladesh Trade Relations, and his second book, Non-Traditional Security Strategy for Addressing Trans-border Crime in Bangladesh, is awaiting publication.

== Military career ==
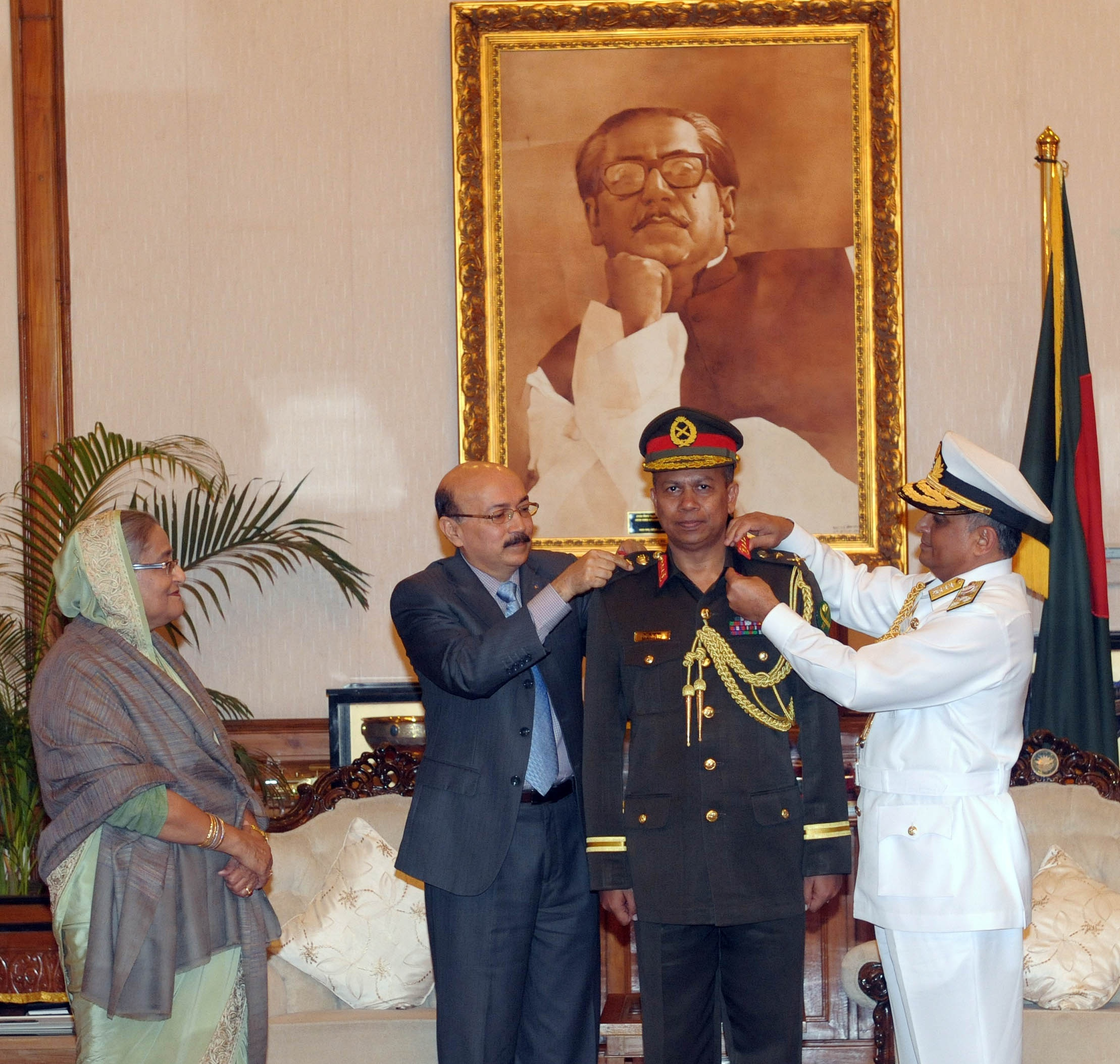
Mahfuzur Rahman receives the lieutenant general rank badge

He commanded one infantry battalion, two infantry brigades, and one infantry division of the Bangladesh Army. He has served as brigade major and general staff officer grade one and director of military operations in the headquarters of the Bangladesh Army.

He has also been an instructor in the Bangladesh Military Academy, directing the Staff of War Course at the National Defence College. He has also served as a commandant of the Defence Service Command & Staff College and commandant of the School of Infantry & Tactics of the Bangladesh Army. He has served as the Adjutant General of the Bangladesh Army and vice chairman of Trust Bank.

=== UN mission ===
Rahman has served in peace support operations under the United Nations in Mozambique and Sierra Leone.

Preceded by Lt.Gen Md Mainul Islam	Principal Staff Officer of the Armed Forces Division; ~	Succeeded by Lt Gen Waker-uz-Zaman
