= Muhammad Nazimuddin =

Bangladeshi military officer

- Born: 10 October 1960 (age 66); Kushtia, East Pakistan, Pakistan
- Military career
- Allegiance: Bangladesh
- Branch: Bangladesh Army; Bangladesh Ansar
- Service years: June 10, 1983 - August 26, 2019
- Rank: Lieutenant General
- Unit: East Bengal Regiment
- Commands: Chief of General Staff at Army Headquarters; GOC of ARTDOC; GOC of 55th Infantry Division; Director General of Bangladesh Ansar and VDP

Muhammad Nazimuddin (Bengali: মোঃ নাজিমুদ্দিন) is a retired lieutenant general of the Bangladesh Army. He served as general officer commanding (GOC) of Army Training and Doctrine Command (ARTDOC) and of the 55th Infantry Division, and as the chief of general staff (CGS).

== Career ==
Nazimuddin was commissioned in the Bangladesh Army in 1983. He rose to become the director general of the Bangladesh Ansar. After that he became general officer commanding (GOC) of the 55th Infantry Division and Jessore area commander. In 2017, he was promoted to lieutenant general and appointed the chief of general staff (CGS). In 2018, he was transferred to become GOC of Army Training and Doctrine Command (ARTDOC).
