= Mizanur Rahman Shamim =

Retired Bangladeshi Lieutenant General

Mizanur Rahman Shameem BP SBP OSP BAM
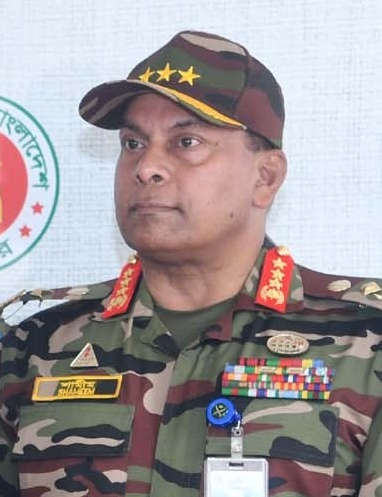
- Shamim in 2025

Chief of General Staff
- In office 6 August 2024 – 17 January 2026
- President: Mohammed Shahabuddin
- Prime Minister: Muhammad Yunus (acting)
- Preceded by: Shaheenul Haque
- Succeeded by: Mainur Rahman

Principal Staff Officer of Armed Forces Division
- In office 29 December 2023 – 6 August 2024
- President: Mohammed Shahabuddin
- Prime Minister: Sheikh Hasina
- Preceded by: Waker-Uz-Zaman
- Succeeded by: S. M. Kamrul Hassan

Personal details
- Born: 18 January 1968 (age 58) Madaripur, Faridpur district, East Pakistan
- Education: Bangladesh Military Academy
- Awards: Bir Protik; Senabahini Padak (SBP); Oshamanno Sheba Padak (OSP)

Military service
- Allegiance: Bangladesh
- Branch/service: Bangladesh Army; Bangladesh Ansar
- Years of service: 1987 – 2026
- Rank: Lieutenant General
- Unit: Bangladesh Infantry Regiment
- Commands: Chief of General Staff; Principal Staff Officer of Armed Forces Division; GOC of 9th Infantry Division; GOC of 24th Infantry Division; Director General of Bangladesh Ansar and Village Defence Party; GOC of 19th Infantry Division; Commander of 111th Infantry Brigade

Mizanur Rahman Shamim (Note: Bengali: মিজানুর রহমান শামীম) (Note: BP, SBP, OSP, BAM, ndc, psc) is a retired three-star general who most notably served as the chief of general staff of the Bangladesh Army. Prior to becoming CGS, he was the principal staff officer (PSO) of the Armed Forces Division.

He received the third-highest gallantry award, Bir Protik, for conducting an operation in the Chittagong Hill Tracts.

== Early life and family ==
Shamim was born on 18 January 1968 to a Bengali family in Madaripur, Faridpur district, East Pakistan (now Bangladesh). He was the grandson of Nur Muhammad Bijoypuri, a former professor at the Gournadi Government College.

== Career ==
Shamim is an officer from the 17th BMA long course. Shamim was the GOC of the 19th Infantry Division in 2019. He was the Ghatail Area Commander of the Bangladesh Army. He oversaw a joint Bangladeshi-Indian army exercise.

Shamim was appointed the director general of the Bangladesh Ansar and Village Defense Party on 29 July 2020. He replaced Major General Kazi Sharif Kaikobad. He led the unit during the COVID-19 pandemic in Bangladesh. In December 2021, he distributed books written by President Sheikh Mujibur Rahman to officers of Bangladesh Ansar and the Village Defence Party. As chairman of Ansar-VDP Unnayan, he handed over Bangladeshi Tk 42.5 million to Sheikh Mohammad Salim Ullah, secretary of the Financial Institution Division, to spend on government development programs.

He also served as the GOC of the 19th Infantry Division. He had also served as general officer commanding (GOC) of the 9th Infantry Division. He served as the director (admin) of National Security Intelligence (NSI) and commanded one infantry brigade in Bogra. On 19 July 2022, he was posted to the 24th Infantry Division as GOC and area commander of the Chattogram Area.

On 6 August 2024, Shamim was appointed chief of the general staff of the Bangladesh Army following the fall of the Awami League government led by Prime Minister Sheikh Hasina. Previously, he was serving as the principal staff officer of the Prime Minister's Office, Armed Forces Division.

== Personal life ==
General Shameem is married to Rehana Parveen Mukti. He is the father of one son and one daughter. His son Shadmanur Rahman Arnab is serving in the military.

== Awards and Decorations ==
Bir Protik

(Bir Protik)

Oshamanno Sheba Padak (OSP)

(Oshamanno Sheba Padak)

Senabahini Padak (SBP)

(Senabahini Padak)
