= Mohammad Shaheenul Haque =

Bangladesh Army general

Mohammad Shaheenul Haque BSP, OSP
- মোহাম্মদ শাহীনুল হক
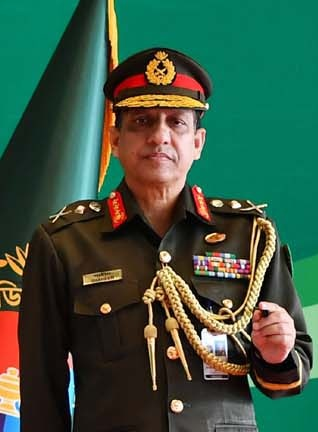
- Haque in 2024

Chief of the General Staff
- In office 22 june 2024 – 6 August 2024
- President: Mohammed Shahabuddin
- Prime Minister: Sheikh Hasina
- Preceded by: Waker-Uz-Zaman
- Succeeded by: Mizanur Rahman Shamim

Personal details
- Born: 6 January 1969 (age 57) Narail, East Pakistan, Pakistan (now Bangladesh)
- Spouse: Fatema Tuz Zohora
- Education: Bangladesh Military Academy; National Defence College; College of Defence Management
- Awards: Sword of Honour (BMA); Bishishto Seba Padak (BSP); Oshamanno Sheba Padak(OSP)

Military service
- Allegiance: Bangladesh
- Branch/service: Bangladesh Army
- Years of service: 1989 – present
- Rank: Lieutenant General
- Unit: East Bengal Regiment
- Commands: Quartermaster general; Commandant of National Defence College; Chief of the General Staff; MGO at Army Headquarters; GOC of 24th Infantry Division; GOC of 9th Infantry Division; Commandant of School of Infantry and Tactics; Commander of 101st Infantry Brigade
- Battles/wars: Chittagong Hill Tracts Conflict; ONUMOZ; MONUSCO

Mohammad Shaheenul Haque (Note: Bengali: মোহাম্মদ শাহিনুল হক) (Note: OSP, BSP, ndc, hdmc, psc) (born 6 January 1969) is a three-star general and the quartermaster general of the Bangladesh Army. Prior to this, he served as the commandant of National Defence College. Shaheen was the former chief of the general staff and master general of ordnance of the army.

== Early life and education ==
Shaheen was born 1969 to a Bengali Muslim family of Narail, then at East Pakistan, Pakistan (now in Khulna Division, Bangladesh). After finishing high school, Shaheen enlisted to the Bangladesh Military Academy through Inter Services Selection Board in 1987 and was commissioned in the East Bengal Regiment in July 1989. Shaheen received the sword of honour for being the top officer's cadet in 20th BMA long course. Shaheen is a graduate of the Defence Services Command and Staff College and also the National Defence College. Shaheen also obtained his higher defence management course from College of Defence Management in India.

== Military career ==
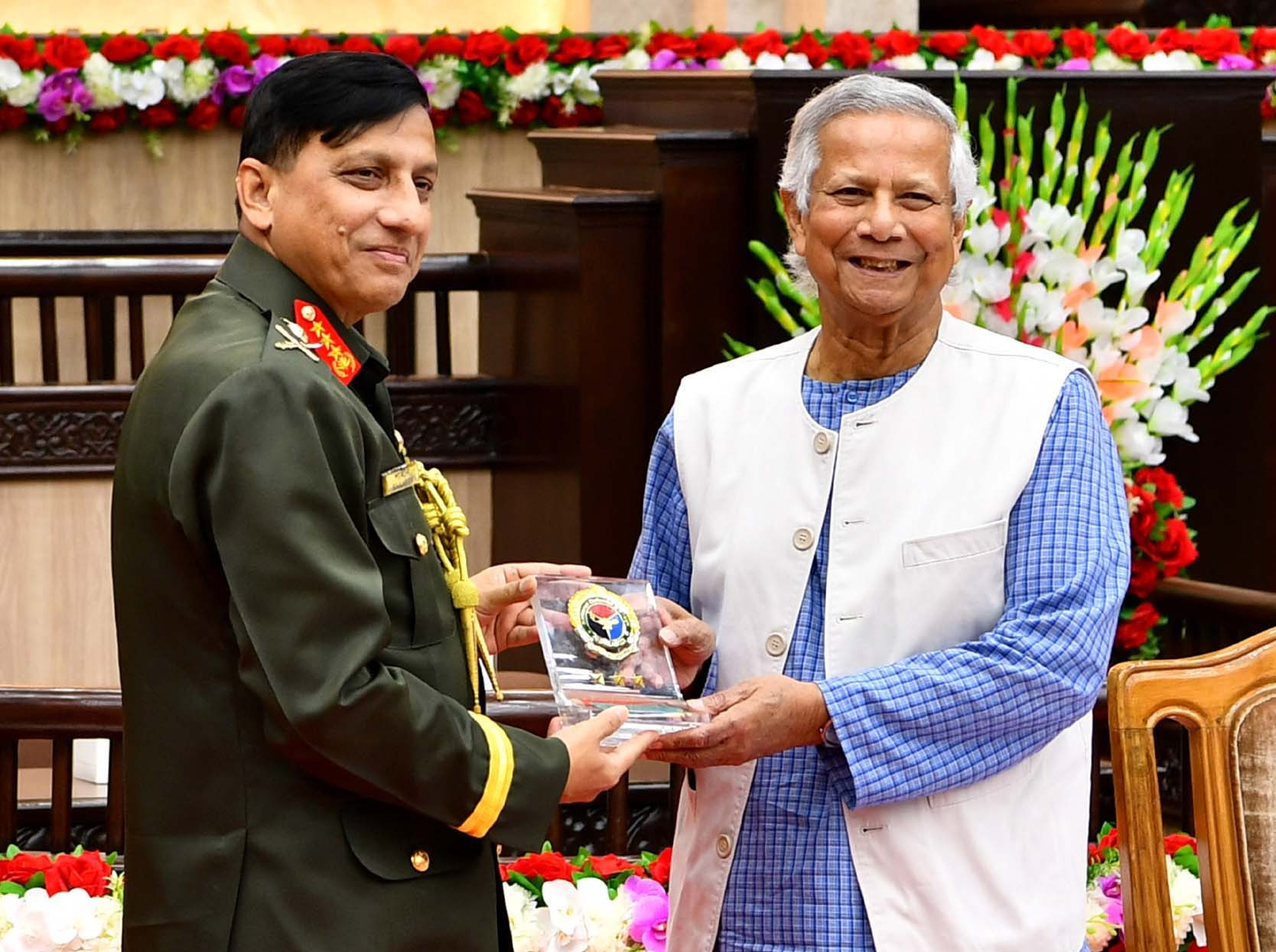
Haque with Muhammad Yunus in 2024

Shaheen commanded one infantry company during the Chittagong Hill Tracts conflict, one infantry battalion, the 18th Bangladesh Infantry Regiment and was furthermore the platoon commander of the Bangladesh Military Academy. Shaheen also served as director of weapons, equipments and statistics directorate in army headquarters. As colonel, Shaheen worked as general staff officer grade-2 (Coordination) and also the assistance military secretary in the headquarter's military secretary branch. He was also the colonel staff of the 55th Infantry Division in Jessore. As brigadier general, Shaheen commanded the 101st Infantry Brigade in Cumilla.

Shaheen was promoted to major general in 2019 and was appointed as commandant of School of Infantry and Tactics. He then tenured as the general officer commanding of the 9th Infantry Division on 23 December 2020 and the 24th Infantry Division in August 2023. Shaheen returned to army headquarters for serving as the master general of ordnance the same year on December.

He was promoted to lieutenant general and designated as the chief of the general staff of the army in July 2024. His post was truncated in the aftermath of July Revolution and was transferred to National Defence College as the commandant. After the Bangladesh Nationalist Party came to power in 2026, he was transferred back to Army HQ as quartermaster general.

=== United Nations peacekeeping missions ===
Rahman served in United Nations peacekeeping missions twice. First, under UNSC in Mozambique, he served in ONUMOZ from 1996 to 1997. Then again as a commanding officer of BANBAT-11 in MONUSCO in the Democratic Republic of the Congo from 2012 to 2013 and received citations by SRSG for outstanding performance.

== Personal life ==
Shaheen is married to Fatema Tuz Zohora, with two children.
