= Muhammad Mainur Rahman =

Bangladeshi three-star General

Mainur Rahman OSP, SUP
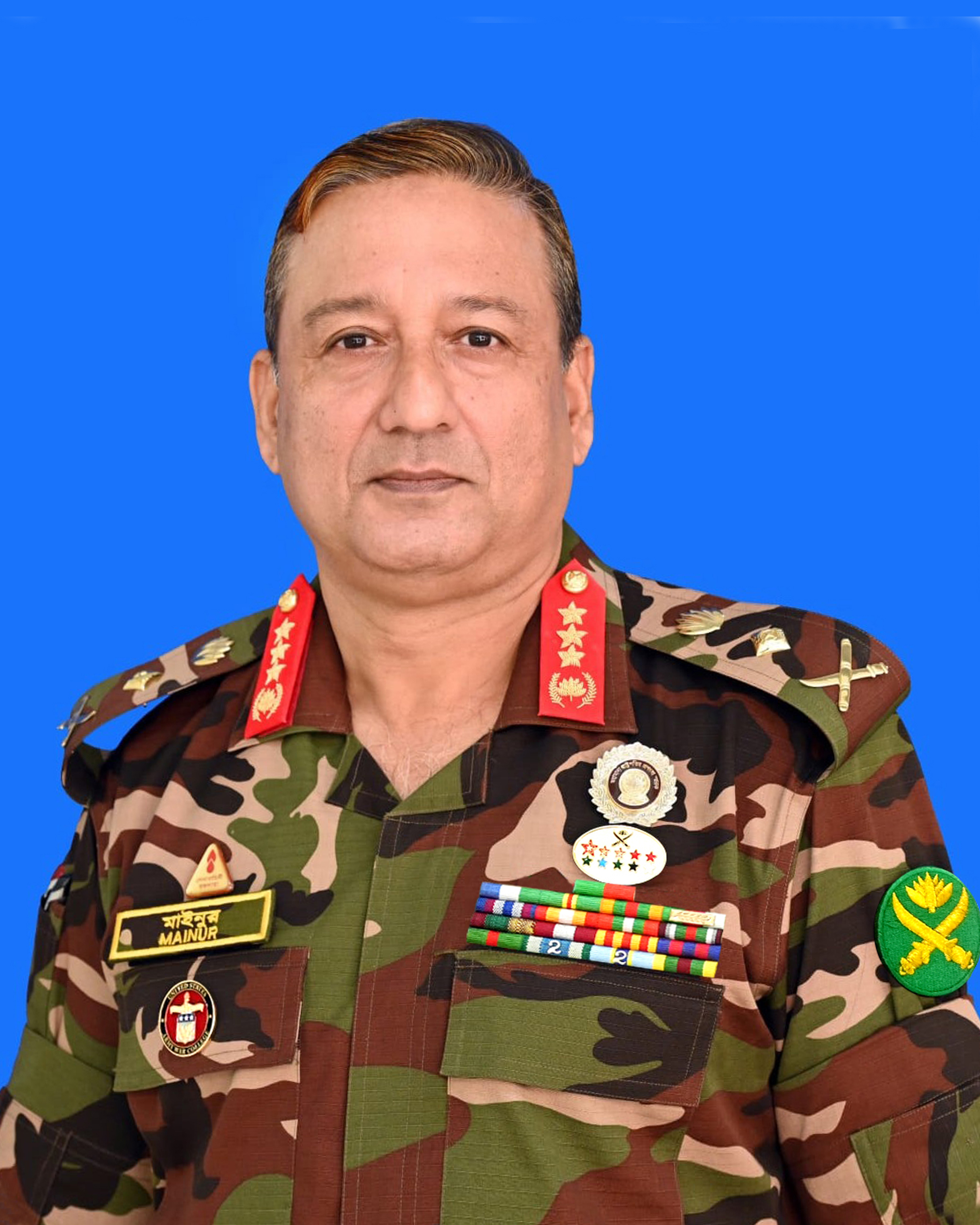
- Mainur Rahman in 2026

Chief of General Staff
- Incumbent
- Assumed office 23 February 2026
- President: Mohammed Shahabuddin; Hafiz Uddin Ahmad (acting); Mirza Fakrul Islam Alamgir
- Prime Minister: Tarique Rahman
- Preceded by: Mizanur Rahman Shamim

Personal details
- Born: Dhaka, Bangladesh
- Education: Bangladesh Military Academy
- Awards: Sword of Honour (BMA); Sena Utkorsho Padak(SUP); Oshamanno Sheba Padak(OSP)

Military service
- Allegiance: Bangladesh
- Branch/service: Bangladesh Army
- Years of service: 1991–present
- Rank: Lieutenant General
- Unit: East Bengal Regiment
- Commands: Chief of General Staff; GOC of ARTDOC; GOC of 24th Infantry Division; GOC of 33rd Infantry Division; Commander of 305th Infantry Brigade; Commander of 21st Infantry Brigade; CO of 4th East Bengal Regiment

Muhammad Mainur Rahman (Note: OSP, SUP, awc, psc) is a three-star general and the chief of general staff of Bangladesh Army. Prior to that, he was commander of the Army Training and Doctrine Command of Bangladesh Army. Mainur served as the general officer commanding of 24th Infantry Division and the 33rd Infantry Division before being promoted to lieutenant general on 14 October 2024.

== Early life and education ==
Mainur was born in Dhaka of then East Pakistan, Pakistan (now Bangladesh). After completing secondary and higher-secondary education from Jhenaidah Cadet College, he joined Bangladesh Military Academy with BMA Long Course in 1989 and was commissioned in East Bengal Regiment on 21 June 1991. He was awarded the Sword of Honour for the best all-round performance amongst the officer cadets of 24 BMA Long Course. Mainur graduated from Defence Services Command and Staff College in 2005 and the United States Army War College in 2018.

== Military career ==
Mainur instructed in School of Infantry and Tactics and the Defense Services Command and Staff College. He also served as brigade major of 203rd Infantry Brigade at Khagrachari Cantonment and commanded an infantry company and an infantry battalion, the 4th East Bengal Regiment. He was promoted to brigadier general on 2015 and served as assistant military secretary at the Office of the President of Bangladesh. He commanded two infantry brigades including one in Chittagong Hill Tracts and served as the director of Weapons, Equipment and Statistics Directorate in Army Headquarters.

Mainur was promoted to the rank of major general on 20 July 2022 and commanded two infantry divisions at Chittagong and Comilla. He was promoted to lieutenant general on 14 October 2024 and designated as commander of the Army Training and Doctrine Command. Mainur succeeded defamed lieutenant general Mujibur Rahman who was dismissed after the July Revolution.

After the retirement of Lt. General Mizanur Rahman Shamim, he was made Chief of General Staff (CGS).

=== United Nations Peacekeeping Missions ===
Mainur Rahman served in two United Nations peacekeeping missions. He first served as a contingent member of BANBAT-8 under the United Nations mission in Sierra Leone from 2001 to 2002. He later served as Contingent Commander of BANBAT-8 (4 East Bengal Regiment) Under MONUSCO in the Democratic Republic of Congo from 2009-2010.
