= Rajshahi Cantonment =

Bangladeshi military cantonment

- রাজশাহী সেনানিবাস
- Rajshahi
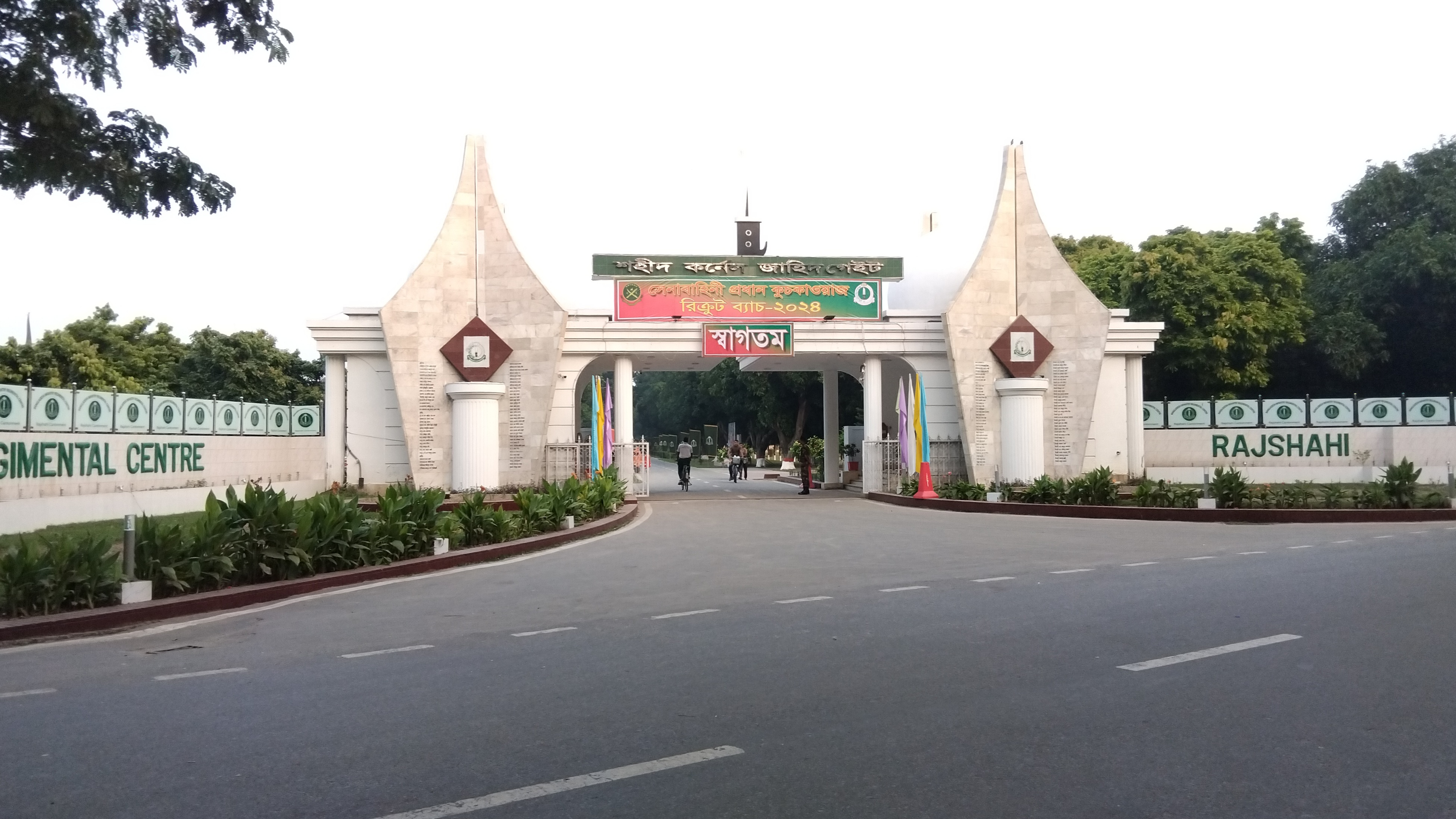

Site information
- Type: Cantonment
- Controlled by: Bangladesh Army

Location
- Coordinates: 24.387752°N 88.599156°E

Rajshahi Cantonment is a Bangladeshi military cantonment in Rajshahi.

It is the home of Bangladesh Infantry Regimental Centre (BIRC), which is an infantry training centre of Bangladesh Infantry Regiment of Bangladesh Army.

== Institutions ==
- Bangladesh Infantry Regimental Centre
- BIRC Training Battalion

== Establishments ==
=== Education ===
- Rajshahi Cantonment Public School and College
- Rajshahi Cantonment Board School and College (established 1986)

=== Healthcare ===
- Combined Military Hospital
