= S. M. Kamrul Hassan =

Lieutenant General of Bangladesh Army

S M Kamrul Hassan BSP
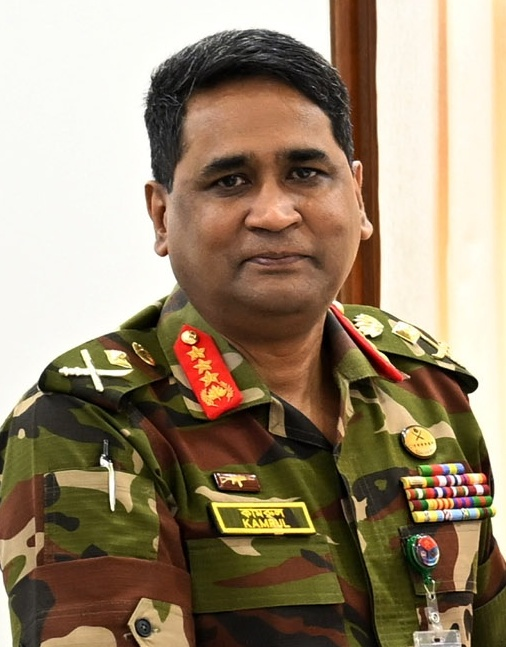
- Hassan in 2025

Principal Staff Officer of Armed Forces Division
- In office 22 August 2024 – 22 February 2026
- President: Mohammed Shahabuddin
- Prime Minister: Muhammad Yunus (acting); Tarique Rahman
- Preceded by: Mizanur Rahman Shamim
- Succeeded by: Mir Mushfiqur Rahman

Personal details
- Education: Bangladesh Military Academy
- Awards: Bishishto Seba Padak (BSP)

Military service
- Allegiance: Bangladesh
- Branch/service: Bangladesh Army
- Years of service: 1989 – present
- Rank: Lieutenant General
- Unit: East Bengal Regiment
- Commands: Principal Staff Officer at Armed Forces Division; Senior Directing Staff at National Defence College; Commandant of Bangladesh Military Academy; GOC of 66th Infantry Division; Commander of 6th Infantry Brigade; Commander of 52nd Infantry Brigade
- Battles/wars: Chittagong Hill Tracts Conflict; UNIKOM; UNMIL; MINUSCA

S M Kamrul Hassan is a three-star general of the Bangladesh Army and ambassador of Bangladesh to Portugal. He is former principal staff officer of the Armed Forces Division.

== Education ==
Hassan finished high school from Mirzapur Cadet College and enlisted to Bangladesh Military Academy in 1987. He was commissioned in East Bengal Regiment in December 1989 on 21st BMA long course. He is also a graduate of the Defence Services Command and Staff College and National Defence College. Additionally, he has three master's degrees and also acquired a PhD on Internet Usage in Political Communication.

== Career ==
Hassan's career spans mostly on training, doctrine and combat operations. He taught and served as instructor at School of Infantry and Tactics, platoon commander, battalion commander and commandant of the Bangladesh Military Academy, served as directing staff and also the chief instructor in Defence Services Command and Staff College and was senior directing staff at National Defence College.

Hassan commanded two infantry battalions in which one battalion served in United Nations peacekeeping. He was deployed in combat operations for over 10 years in Chittagong Hill Tracts Conflit Insurgency, Iraqi-Kuwait, Liberia and led troops in Central African Republic as brigadier general in peacekeeping operations. He also commanded two infantry brigades in Lebukhali and Sylhet, and the 66th Infantry Division.

On 22 August 2024, he was promoted to the rank of lieutenant general and appointed as the 17th principal staff officer (PSO) of the Armed Forces Division. As PSO, he was instrumental in strengthening military ties with Pakistan. After the 2025 Chengdu J-7 crash, he headed the investigation committee in charge of finding the causes behind the crash.

In November 2025, he visited Qatar and signed a historic agreement, which allowed Bangladeshi army personnel to serve in the Qatar Armed Forces on deputation.

After the 2026 Bangladeshi general election, he was made an ambassador at the Ministry of Foreign Affairs. He is currently serving as Bangladesh's Ambassador to Portugal.
