= Disaster Management Bureau =

Bangladesh government organization

- Formation: 1993
- Headquarters: Dhaka, Bangladesh
- Region served: Bangladesh
- Official language: Bengali
- Website: ddm.gov.bd

Disaster Management Bureau is a government bureau that manages government responses to natural disasters in Bangladesh and is located in Dhaka, Bangladesh.

== History ==
The Disaster Management Bureau by Ministry of Disaster Management and Relief in 1993. Following the 1991 Bangladesh cyclone and floods in Bangladesh, the government felt a need for a dedicated bureau to manage relief operations in the country. The bureau is headed by a Director General.
