= Rafiq =

Rafiq or Rafique (Arabic: رفیق), (Persian: رفیق), meaning "intimate friend," "companion," and "comrade," is an Arabic masculine given name and surname also used in Persian and several other languages. Notable people with the name include:

== Constituent of compound name ==
- Rafiqul Islam (disambiguation)
- Mohammad Rafiq (disambiguation), several people

== Given name ==
- Rafiq Uddin Ahmed (1926–1952), demonstrator killed during Bengali Language Movement
- Rafiquddin Ahmad (1932–2013), chairman of Bangladesh Engineering and Shipbuilding Corporation
- Rafiq Azad (1941–2016), Bengali poet
- Rafiq Bhatia (born 1987), American musician
- Rafiq Sabir (born 1950), Kurdish poet
- Rafiq Shahadah (born 1956), Syrian military officer
- Rafiq Tağı (1950–2011), Azerbaijani journalist
- Rafiq Zakaria (1920–2005), Indian politician

== Surname ==
- Azeem Rafiq (born 1991), English cricketer
- Bilal Rafiq (born 1985), Pakistani footballer
- Mikyle Rafiq (born 2004), American streamer and YouTuber better known as N3on

== Other ==
- Rafiq or companion, a title in the hierarchy of the Nizari Ismailis of Alamut period
