= Kurmitola Golf Club =

Coordinates: 23.7993°N 90.3963°E

- কুর্মিটোলা গলফ ক্লাব
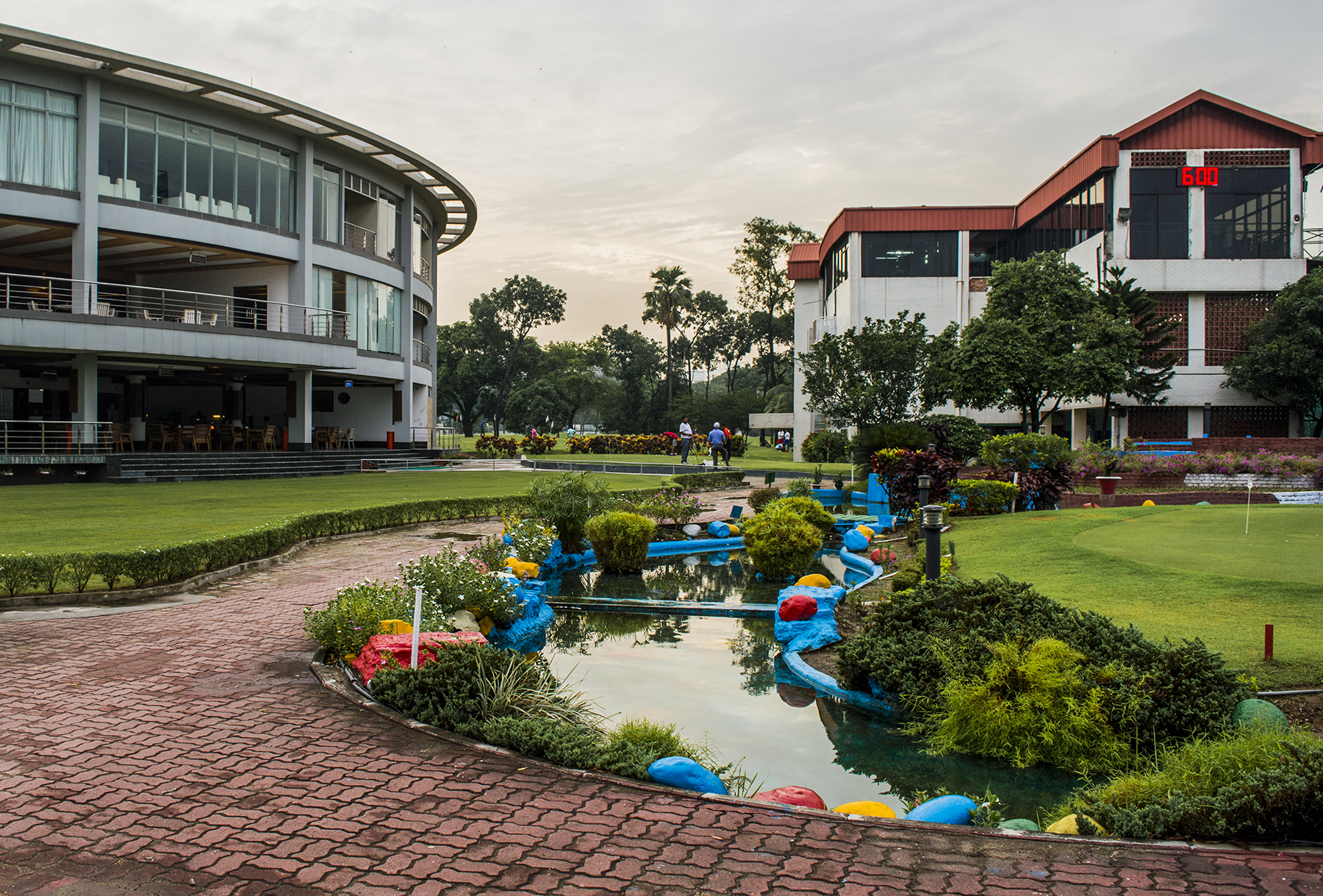
- Kurmitola Golf Club
- Formation: 1956
- Headquarters: Dhaka, Bangladesh
- Region served: Bangladesh
- Official language: Bengali
- Website: kgc-bd.com

Kurmitola Golf Club is a golf club in Dhaka Cantonment, Bangladesh. It is operated by Bangladesh Army. The president of the club is the Chief of Army Staff Bangladesh Army General Waker-uz-Zaman. The club has been described as "prestigious".

== History ==
The club was formed in 1956. It was shifted to its present location in 1966. In 2016, the golf club was offered by the foreign ministry of Bangladesh to diplomats residing in the country; after outdoor activities by diplomats were cut over security fears. Siddikur Rahman, a former caddy at the golf club become the first Bangladeshi in history to compete in golf at the Olympics in 2016. The club has held professional national and international golfing tournaments including the Asian Tour event, Bashundhara Bangladesh Open.
