= Rafiqul Islam (general) =

Bangladesh Army major general and freedom fighter

- মোঃ রফিকুল ইসলাম
- Born: 4 February 1956; Banaripara, East Pakistan, Pakistan
- Died: 9 March 2009 (aged 53); Kalihati, Bangladesh
- Military career
- Allegiance: Bangladesh
- Branch: Bangladesh Army
- Service years: 1977 - 2009
- Rank: Major General
- Unit: East Bengal Regiment
- Commands: GOC of 55th Infantry Division; Commander of Logistics Area; Commander of 305th Infantry Brigade
- Conflicts: Bangladesh Liberation War

Muhammad Rafiqul Islam (4 February 1956 – 9 March 2009) was a two star officer of Bangladesh Army and commander of 55th Infantry Division. Islam is notable for orchestrating reliefs for the sufferers of Cyclone Sidr in 2007 and was killed in a Bell 206 accident on 2009.

== Early life and education ==
Islam was born on 4 February 1956 in Banaripara Upazila, Barishal District, East Pakistan, Pakistan. He studied at the Government Banaripara Model Union Institution and the Government Brojomohun College. His compatriots claimed that Islam at the age of 15 participated in the Bangladesh Liberation War in 1971. He later attended the University of Dhaka and, as a second-year student, joined the Bangladesh Army. In 1976, Islam was enlisted into the Bangladesh Military Academy and was commissioned with the 5th short course in 1977 and was assigned to East Bengal Regiment.

== Military career ==
Islam served in the 2nd East Bengal Regiment, 15th East Bengal Regiment, 30th East Bengal Regiment, 45th East Bengal Regiment and 46th East Bengal Regiment. Islam took part in a number of military and national operations, including counterinsurgency missions in the Chittagong Hill Tracts, Operation Dabanal, Operation Uttaran, Operation Hunting Tiger, Operation Clean Heart, and United Nations peacekeeping duties during the First Ivorian Civil War. Islam also held several command and staff appointments. He was a company commander of the President Guard Regiment, an additional defence attaché at the Bangladesh High Commission in London, the commander of the 305th Infantry Brigade, and the colonel of staff of the 24th Infantry Division. On 8 March 2007, he was promoted to Major General.

Islam was then appointed the General Officer Commanding of the 55th Infantry Division based in Jessore Cantonment. He led rescue operations following Cyclone Sidr called Operation Ashar Alo. He led efforts to reduce waterlogging in Jessore, supported reforms at Benapole Port, oversaw law-and-order operations in Southwest Bangladesh, and worked on the National Identity Card project.

== Personal life and death ==
Islam had three sons. His cousin is the notable journalist Golam Sarwar. Islam had longstanding ties with Major General Shakil Ahmed and was reportedly affected by the deaths of officers during the Bangladesh Rifles mutiny in February 2009. He sent troops to rescue Army officers trapped at the Bangladesh Rifles Jessore District headquarters. On 9 March 2009, Islam died in a Bell 206 helicopter crash at Kalihati Upazila, Tangail District, while serving as GOC of the 55th Infantry Division. In the same crash, pilot Lieutenant Colonel Shahidul Islam also died, and another pilot, Major Saif, was severely injured. The helicopter was travelling from Jessore Cantonment to Mymensingh Cantonment. The helicopter crashed into an electrical wire, then hit a banyan tree, and crashed into a pond beside Rouha Government Primary School. Following his death, the government declared 11 March 2009 a national day of mourning. The funeral of Islam was held along with the funerals of Lieutenant Colonel Shahidul Islam and two officers who died in the Bangladesh Rifles mutiny, Colonel Gulzar Uddin Ahmed and Lieutenant Colonel Elahi Manzoor Chowdhury.
