= Bangladesh Infantry Regimental Centre =

Infantry training centre of Bangladesh Infantry Regiment of Bangladesh Army

- Insignia of the Bangladesh Infantry Regiment
- Formation: 1 July 1999
- Headquarters: Rajshahi Cantonment, Bangladesh
- Region served: Bangladesh
- Official language: Bengali
- Commandant: Major General Muhammad Nazim Ud Daula
- Parent organization: ARTDOC

Bangladesh Infantry Regimental Centre is an infantry training centre of Bangladesh Infantry Regiment of Bangladesh Army. It is located within Rajshahi Cantonment. The centre was established on 1 July 1999.

Major General Muhammad Nazim Ud Daula is the current Commandant of Bangladesh Infantry Regimental Centre and flag officer commanding of the regiment.

== See also ==
- Bangladesh Infantry Regiment
- East Bengal Regimental Centre
