= Rafiqul Islam (civil servant) =

Election Commissioner of Bangladesh

- রফিকুল ইসলাম

Election Commissioner of Bangladesh
- In office 15 February 2017 – 14 February 2022
- President: Abdul Hamid

Personal details
- Born: 1 January 1955 (age 71) Rajshahi, East Pakistan
- Known for: Election commissioner

Rafiqul Islam (born 1 January 1955) is a Bangladeshi civil servant who served as one of the Election Commissioners of Bangladesh during 2017–2022.

== Early life ==
Rafiqul Islam was born on 1 January 1955 in Godagari Upazila of Rajshahi District of then East Pakistan (now Bangladesh) to Tufani Mondol and Rahima Begum. He completed his Secondary School Certificate from Godagari High School and Higher Secondary School Certificate from Rajshahi College. He obtained his Bachelor of Arts in Economics in a University of Bulgaria and earned his master's degree in Financial Management from the United Kingdom. In 2004, he received his PhD Degree in Management from the United States. He also has a Diploma on Computing and Project Management.

== Career ==
Rafiqul Islam joined the Bangladesh Civil Service (administration) as Assistant Secretary in 1984. He served as Secretary of the Department of Information and Communication Technology and the Ministry of Science and Technology. He also served as the project director, joint secretary and additional secretary in the Election Commission Secretariat. On 31 December 2013, he retired from government service.

On 15 February 2017, Rafiqul Islam was appointed as a member of the Bangladesh Election Commission by the President of Bangladesh Abdul Hamid. The commission consists of five members and headed by KM Nurul Huda.

== Personal life ==
Rafiqul Islam is married to Nazmun Ara Begum, a former Professor of Eden Mohila College, in his personal life. The couple has a son and a daughter.
