= Muhammad Rafiqul Islam =

18th Director General of Border Guards Bangladesh
- In office 9 May 2010 – 30 June 2011
- President: Zillur Rahman
- Prime Minister: Sheikh Hasina
- Preceded by: Mainul Islam
- Succeeded by: Anwar Hussain

Personal details
- Education: Military Training Bangladesh Military Academy

Military service
- Allegiance: Bangladesh
- Branch/service: Bangladesh Army; Border Guards Bangladesh
- Years of service: 1976–2011
- Rank: Major General
- Unit: Corps of Signals
- Commands: Director General of Border Guards Bangladesh; Commandant of Signal Training School and College
- Battles/wars: ONUMOZ

Muhammad Rafiqul Islam is a retired Bangladesh Army major general and former director general of Border Guards Bangladesh.

== Career ==
Rafiqul joined the Signals Corps of the Bangladesh Army on 30 November 1976. He served in the Military Operation Directorate as its GSO. He was the assistant private secretary to the chief of army staff. From 1993 to 1994, he served as the deputy regional commander of the United Nations Operation in Mozambique. He was the commandant of the Signal Training School and College and served as the commanding officer of two signal battalions.

Rafiqul Islam served as the director of signals in the Bangladesh Army Headquarters. He served in the Prime Minister's Office and the Armed Forces Division as the director of operations. He was appointed director general of Border Guards Bangladesh on 11 May 2011. He presided over the special court no-3 of the Border Guards Bangladesh that tried mutineers of the Bangladesh Rifles Mutiny of 2009. He also presided over special court no-7 of the BDR trial. He left the Bangladesh Border Guards on 1 July 2011 and was replaced by Major General Anwar Hussain. On 14 July 2011, he went on leave prior to his retirement.
