= Rafiqul Islam (scientist) =

Bangladeshi physician and medical scientist

- রফিকুল ইসলাম
- Born: 1936; Chauddagram, Tippera district, Bengal Presidency
- Died: 5 March 2018 (aged 81–82); Apollo Hospital Dhaka, Bangladesh
- Education: Dhaka Medical College
- Occupations: Physician and medical scientist
- Known for: Major role in development of ORS

Rafiqul Islam (Bengali: রফিকুল ইসলাম; 1936 – 5 March 2018) was a Bangladeshi physician and medical scientist. He is known for his revelation in the development of food saline (Orsaline) for the treatment of diarrhea. The Lancet considered this discovery to be "the most important medical discovery of the 20th century".

== Early life and education ==
Rafiqul Islam was born in 1936 in Chauddagram, Tippera district, Bengal Presidency (now Comilla District, Bangladesh). He graduated with an MBBS from Dacca Medical College in 1965. Islam later received higher education in the field of Tropical medicine and hygiene in the United Kingdom.

== Career ==
After passing MBBS, Rafiqul Islam joined the International Center for Diarrheal Disease Research, Bangladesh and retired from this institution in 2000. While working in this organization, he researched various medicines. One of his most important inventions is the food saline (Orsaline). When cholera spread in the refugee camps of West Bengal in India during the Bangladesh Liberation War in 1971, only therapeutic (intravenous) fluid was given to the vein as treatment. But due to the lack of intravenous fluid, it was possible to recover from the disease with its saline disinfected. After the independence of Bangladesh, a widespread publicity campaign was conducted on the use of saline in the treatment of diarrhea. As a result, it was also known as "Dhaka Saline". In the year 1980, the World Health Organization recognized Orsaline. Besides, Bangladeshi non-government organization BRAC played the role of spreading food saline to the remote areas of Bangladesh.

== Death ==
Islam suffered a heart attack and from old age-related ailments in February 2018. He was taken to Apollo Hospital Dhaka where he died on 5 March 2018.
