= 55th Infantry Division (Bangladesh) =

Division of the Bangladesh Army

- Insignia of 55th Infantry Division
- Active: 1976-present
- Country: Bangladesh
- Branch: Bangladesh Army
- Type: Infantry
- Size: Division
- Garrison/HQ: Jessore Cantonment

Commanders
- Current commander: Major General Hafizur Rahman
- Notable commanders: Major General Mustafizur Rahman; Major General Jamilud Din Ahsan; Major General Abdul Mubeen; Major General Shafiqur Rahman

The 55th Infantry Division (Bengali: ৫৫ পদাতিক ডিভিশন) is a formation of the Bangladesh Army based in Jessore Cantonment.

== History ==
Monogram of 55th Independent Infantry Brigade wielded until 1988

The 55th Independent Infantry brigade was one of the five brigades formed in 1972 and stationed at Jessore Cantonment after the independence of Bangladesh. In 1976, it was rechristened as 21st Infantry Brigade and transferred with the newly formed 88th Infantry Brigade and the 55th Artillery Brigade to 55th Infantry division. Maj. Gen Muhammad Fazlur Haque was the first general officer commanding. This division played a prominent capacity on aiding the suffered during Cyclone Sidr in November 2007 under Major General Rafiqul Islam. 55th infantry division is also the first division to be trained with drone adversary stance under orchestration of Major General Matiur Rahman on 2016.

== Formation ==
Under the division, there is three infantry brigade, one artillery brigade, and one armoured regiment.

Combat Arms

- Cavalry
  - 9th Bengal Lancers Regiment
- Regiment of Artillery
  - 55th Artillery Brigade
- Infantry
  - 21st Infantry Brigade
  - 88th Infantry Brigade
  - 105th Infantry Brigade

Combat support

- Engineer
  - 3rd Engineers Regiment
- Signals
  - 2 Signal Battalion

Under service arms, there are two field ambulances, one support transfer battalion, one ordnance company, one EME workshop, two field EME workshop, one Military Police Unit and a Field Intelligence unit.
