= Bangladesh Infantry Regiment =

- বাংলাদেশ ইনফ্যান্ট্রি রেজিমেন্ট
- Insignia of the Bangladesh Infantry Regiment
- Active: 21 April 2001 – present
- Country: Bangladesh
- Branch: Bangladesh Army
- Type: Infantry
- Role: Ground combat
- Size: 46 battalions
- Garrison/HQ: Bangladesh Infantry Regimental Centre, Rajshahi Cantonment
- Nickname: The BIR ("Mighty" in Bangla)
- Mottos: Powerful, Fast, Superior
- Colours: (BCC–27)
- March: "Song of the Youth"

The Bangladesh Infantry Regiment (BIR) is an infantry regiment of the Bangladesh Army. It was raised in 2001 as the second infantry regiment after the East Bengal Regiment. The regiment was raised initially by renaming some battalions of the East Bengal Regiment, before its own recruits were trained. This was the first new regiment raised by the Bangladesh Army in the 21st century, and consequently is also known as the Regiment of the Millennium.

== Role ==
Its stated role is to seek out, close with and destroy the enemy, within a traditional infantry combat scenario, however, the regiment also provides aid to the civilian government when called upon and also contributes regularly to Bangladesh's peacekeeping commitments overseas. The regiment deployed eight battalions to Bangladesh's UN peacekeeping commitments:

- MONUC
  - 7th Bangladesh Infantry Regiment (7 BIR)
- UNOCI
  - 18th Bangladesh Infantry Regiment (18 BIR)
- UNMIL
  - 12th Bangladesh Infantry Regiment (12 BIR)
  - 13th Bangladesh Infantry Regiment (13 BIR)
- UNAMIS
  - 9th Bangladesh Infantry Regiment (9 BIR)
- MINUSMA
  - 34th Bangladesh Infantry Regiment (34 BIR)

== Units ==
This is the list of the units of the Bangladesh Infantry Regiment. (Note: The list is taken from the official document of Bangladesh Army, precisely from Bangladesh Infantry Regimental Centre.)

Unit	Nickname
1 BIR	দ্যা গ্যালান্ট ওয়ান (The Gallant One)
2 BIR	অদ্বিতীয় দুই (Auditiyo Dui)
3 BIR	তেজস্বী তিন (Tejosyi Tin)
4 BIR	অজেও চার (Ojeyo Char)
5 BIR (Sp Bn)	ক্ষিপ্র পাচ (Khipro Pach)
6 BIR	অপরাজেয় ছয় (Oparajeyo Choy)
7 BIR	রণতূর্জ সাত (Ronoturjo Saat)
8 BIR	রণবীর আট (Ronobir Aat)
9 BIR (Mech)	ক্যারেইজাস নাইন (Courageous Nine)
10 BIR	সুদক্ষ দশ (Sudokkho Dosh)
11 BIR (Mech)	দুর্দম এগারো (Durdam Egaro)
12 BIR	লাইটনিং টুয়েলভ (Lightening Twelve)
13 BIR	অপ্রতিরোধ্য তেরো (Oprotiroddho Tero)
14 BIR	গোল্ডেন ফোরটিন (Golden Fourteen)
15 BIR (Sp Bn)	দুরন্ত পনেরো (Duranta Ponero)
16 BIR	চৌকস ষোল (Choukosh Sholo)
17 BIR	উইনিং সেভেনটিন (Winning Seventeen)
18 BIR	প্রানবন্ত আঠার (Pranobonto Atharo)
19 BIR	দীপ্ত উনিশ (Dipto Unish)
20 BIR	সমুন্নত বিশ (Shomunnoto Bish)
21 BIR	দুর্ভেদ্য একুশ (Durveddho Ekush)
22 BIR	বিজয়ী বাইশ (Bijoyi Baish)
23 BIR	প্রত্যয়ী তেইশ (Prottoyi Teish)
24 BIR	সদা প্রস্তুত চব্বিশ (Sada Prosto Chobbish)
25 BIR (Sp Bn)	উদ্দীপ্ত পঁচিশ (Uddipto Pochish)
26 BIR	শানিত ছাব্বিশ (Shanito Chabbish)
27 BIR	বলিষ্ঠ সাতাশ (Bolistho Sataash)
28 BIR	চিরন্তন আটাশ (Chironoton Aataash)
29 BIR	উদ্যমী উনত্রিশ (Uddyomi Unotrish)
30 BIR	অনন্য ত্রিশ (Ononno Trish)
31 BIR	উজ্জীবিত একত্রিশ (Ujjibito Ekotrish)
32 BIR	অবিনশ্বর বত্রিশ (Obinashshor Botrish)
33 BIR	অনবদ্য তেত্রিশ (Onobboddo Tetrish)
34 BIR	বলবান চৌত্রিশ (Bolban Chowtrish)
35 BIR (Sp Bn)	প্রদীপ্ত পঁয়ত্রিশ (Prodipto Pontrish)
36 BIR	সুদৃঢ় ছত্রিশ (Sudridho Chhattrish)
37 BIR	অগ্রণী সাইত্রিশ (Agroni Saitrish)
38 BIR	রণজয়ী আটত্রিশ (Ronjoyi Aattrish)
39 BIR	দি ম্যাগনিফিসেন্ট থার্টি নাইন (The Magnificent Thirty Nine)
40 BIR	উজ্জল চল্লিশ (Ujjol Chollish)
41 BIR	প্রমিজিং ফোরটিওয়ান (Promising Forty One)
42 BIR	তেজদীপ্ত বিয়াল্লিশ (Tejodipto Biallish)
43 BIR	দ্যুতিমান তেতাল্লিশ (Dyutiman Tetallish)
44 BIR	রণদীপ্ত চুয়াল্লিশ (Ronodipto Chualish)
1 Para Commando Battalion	দুর্দান্ত চিতা (Durdanto Cheetah)
2 Para Commando Battalion	তেজস্বী চিতা (Tejoshwi Chita)

== See also ==
- East Bengal Regiment
