= Armed Forces Division =

Government agency of Bangladesh

Armed Forces Division of the People's Republic of Bangladesh
- গণপ্রজাতন্ত্রী বাংলাদেশের সশস্ত্র বাহিনী বিভাগ
- Seal of the Armed Forces Division

Agency overview
- Formed: 10 November 1986; 39 years ago
- Jurisdiction: Bangladesh Armed Forces
- Headquarters: Dhaka Cantonment, Dhaka
- Annual budget: ৳44 crore (US$3.6 million) (2026-2027)
- Prime Minister responsible: Tarique Rahman, Chairman
- Adviser responsible: AKM Shamsul Islam
- Agency executive: Lt. General Mir Mushfiqur Rahman, Principal Staff Officer
- Parent agency: Prime Minister's Office
- Website: Armed Forces Division

The Armed Forces Division (AFD) (Note: Bengali: সশস্ত্র বাহিনী বিভাগ, romanized: Sôśôstrô Bahini Bibhag, pronounced [ˈʃɔʃosˌtɾoˑ ˈbaɦiˌni ˈbibʱag]) is the principal command authority for national defense of Bangladesh. The command and control of the Bangladesh Armed Forces is exercised in this division, under direct control and supervision by the Prime Minister, who is also in charge of Ministry of Defence. The headquarters is located in Dhaka Cantonment.

== History ==
In 1976, the then President Ziaur Rahman organised and created the Commander-in-Chief's Secretariat under the office of the President, consolidating central authority dealing with all national security issues while operating under various degrees of authority and responsibility under Ministry of Defense. President Abdus Sattar intended to further organize and structure the body into Bangladesh National Security Council under the office of the President. However, President Hossain Mohammad Ershad put an immediate hold to bringing the NSC under full civilian control after seizing state power. It was named the Supreme Command Headquarters after 8 years, on 10 November 1986 sealing armed forces control over national security.

After 1991, the presidential system of government by Act of Parliament was abolished, and by October 1994, the Armed Forces Division was integrated into the Prime Minister's Office and concurrently the combined armed forces authority was transferred to this government body. The Armed Forces Division provide directive to the military of Bangladesh during disaster relief operations. Its officers are members of the National Disaster Management Council. The division coordinates relief operations with the Directorate of Relief and Rehabilitation, Disaster Management Bureau and the Ministry of Disaster Management and Relief. In 2017 the ministry coordinated with the division to handle the influx of Rohingya refugees in Bangladesh.

== Function ==
The Armed Forces Division holds ministerial status and performs functions that run parallel to those of the Ministry of Defence in relation to the Bangladesh Armed Forces. It serves as the joint coordinating body for the Army, Navy, and Air Force. In times of war, it operates as the national joint command center, and in peacetime, the division oversees government approval on matters concerning operations, planning, training, intelligence, administration, and logistics. The division is led by the Principal Staff Officer (PSO), an officer of the rank of lieutenant general, who holds the status equivalent to a senior secretary of the Government of Bangladesh.

== Organization ==
The Armed Forces Division is composed of the Principal Staff Officer's Office, five Directorates, and an Administrative Company. The Directorates are:

- Operations and Plans Directorate (O & P)
- Training Directorate (Trg)
- Civil and Military Relation Directorate (CMR)
- Administration and Logistics Directorate (A&L)
- Intelligence Directorate (Int)
