= Armed Forces Day (Bangladesh) =

National day on 21 November

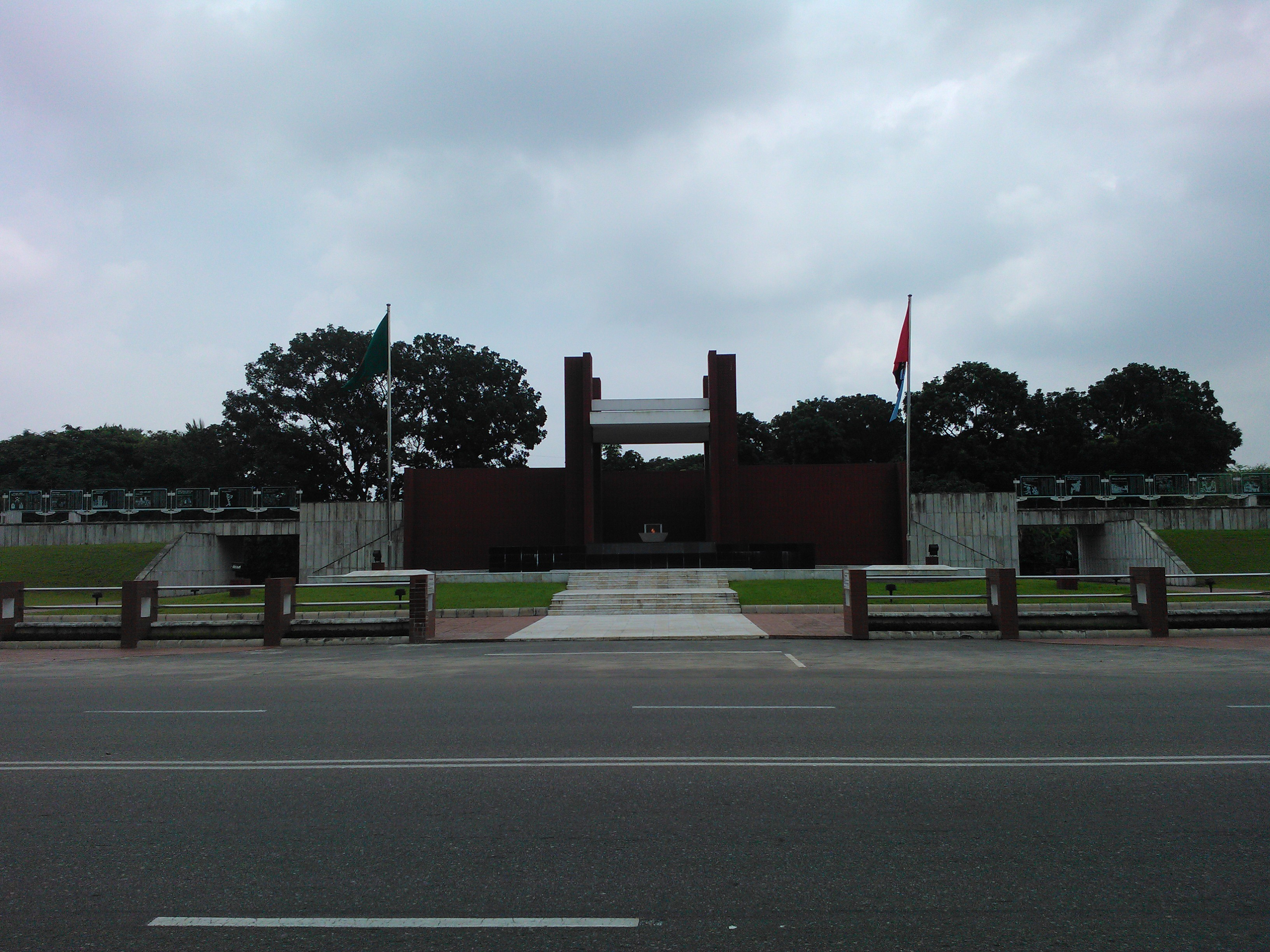
- Shikha Anirban (lit. 'Eternal Flame') at Dhaka Cantonment, where the President and Prime Minister of Bangladesh place wreaths on 21 November annually
- Observed by: Bangladesh
- Significance: Celebrates the official founding of the Bangladesh Armed Forces
- Celebrations: State ceremonies
- Date: 21 November
- Next time: 21 November 2026
- Frequency: annual

Armed Forces Day (Bengali: সশস্ত্র বাহিনী দিবস, romanized: Sôśôstrô Bāhinī Dibôs) is annually observed in Bangladesh on 21 November, signifying formation of Bangladesh Armed Forces on the day in 1971, when the members of the Bangladesh Army, Navy and Air Force were officially unified under and launched joint operations against the Pakistan Armed Forces in the Bangladesh Liberation War. On 16 December 1971, the Pakistani Army of 93,000 surrendered to the joint forces of Bangladesh and India, ending the 9-month long Liberation War of Bangladesh.

== History ==
Bangladesh Liberation War initially commenced in the form of resistance movement as the Pakistan Army cracked down on 25 March 1971, primarily at Dhaka and subsequently extending it to the entire of East Pakistan, now Bangladesh. Gradually, the Bangladesh Forces, commonly known as Mukti Bahini (lit. 'Freedom Forces'), organised small groups of guerrilla fighters who followed "hit and run" tactics. As a third stage in the war, the Bengali military personnel who were members of Pakistan Army, Navy and Air Force deserted their respective units to join Bangladesh Forces and organised them into regular units across the border of Indian territory primarily as land force. A small group of naval commandos also opened the naval wing and a few pilots and airmen formed the air wing.

After prolonged guerrilla warfare by the Bangladesh Forces, operations continued for several months. A further restructuring was undertaken, and the Bangladesh Forces were organised into three brigade-size combat groups:

- Z Force: Lt. Col. Ziaur Rahman was the commander of this force. The brigade was formed with the 1st, 3rd and 8th battalions of East Bengal Regiment on 7 July 1971. The Z Force was raised at the foothills of Tura hill, opposite to Mymensingh.
- K Force: Lt. Col. (later Brig.) Khaled Mosharraf was the commander of this force. The brigade was formed at Agartala, with the 4th, 9th and 10th battalions of East Bengal Regiment on September 1971.
- S Force: Maj. K M Shafiullah was the commander of this force. The Brigade was formed at Hezamara, with the 2nd and 11th battalions of East Bengal Regiment on October 1971.

Many Bengali sailors and officers in the Pakistan Navy decamped, to form an emerging Bangladesh Navy. Initially, there were two ships BNS Padma and BNS Palash and 45 navy personnel. They prevented the supply of arms, ammunition, and rations for the occupation forces. This operation from the Naval Commandos made ports in Chittagong and Mongla highly lethal for the occupation forces.

The official date of formation of the Bangladesh Air Force (BAF) has been established as 28 September 1971 and it was launched formally by the Provisional Government on 8 October 1971. BAF was formed with all officers and airmen of Bengali origin serving in the Pakistan Air Force prior to the war. Out of eleven sectors of Bangladesh Forces, the most tactically significant sector, the Central Sector – Sector 11, was in command of a BAF officer including Sector 6. The BAF started their operation from an abandoned airfield at Dimapur.

On 21 November 1971, after almost nine months into the war of liberation, all three forces led the joint operation simultaneously, marking the day to be the day as Armed Forces Day. The joining of these forces resulted in large areas along the border to be liberated every day. This allowed the Bangladesh Forces to disrupt the lines of communication within a few days. This day bears special significance in the history of Bangladesh and is being celebrated every year with due solemnity and importance, to honour the sacrifices made by the members of the Bangladesh Armed forces, who fought and gave their lives in the liberation war.

== Observances ==
The day starts with laying of floral wreath at Shikha Anirban (Bengali: শিখা অনির্বাণ, romanized: Eternal Flame) at Dhaka Cantonment by the President, the Prime Minister and the Service Chiefs. In the afternoon a reception at Senakunja, Dhaka Cantonment is held where the Prime Minister, ministers, the leader of opposition and other high civil and military officials attend. In other cantonments, naval and air bases similar receptions are held. A special TV programme Anirban is broadcast on different TV channels the previous evening and special newspaper supplements are also published with national dailies. Receptions are also held by the Prime Minister and Service Chiefs for recipients of the gallantry award Freedom Fighters. Improved meals for family members are served in all military stations. Armed Forces Division also brings out a special publication with articles related to the Liberation War and the armed forces.

== See also ==
- Armed Forces Day
