= Mohammad Anwar Hossain =

Bangladesh Army officer martyred in Bangladesh Liberation War of 1971

Anwar Hossain
- মোহাম্মদ আনোয়ার হোসেন
- Born: 5 May 1948; Chandpur, East Bengal, Pakistan
- Died: 29 March 1971 (aged 23); Jessore Cantonment, Khulna, Bangladesh
- Alma mater: Faujdarhat Cadet College; Bangladesh University of Engineering and Technology (no degree); Pakistan Military Academy
- Military career
- Allegiance: Bangladesh; Pakistan (before 1971)
- Branch: Bangladesh Army; Pakistan Army
- Service years: 1970-1971
- Rank: Second Lieutenant
- Unit: 1st East Bengal Regiment
- Conflicts: Bangladesh Liberation War †
- Awards: Bir Uttom

Mohammad Anwar Hossain (May 5, 1948 - March 29, 1971) was a Bangladesh Army officer who fought in the Bangladesh Liberation War. He was killed in the war and posthumously awarded Bir Uttom, the second highest gallantry award in Bangladesh.

== Early life ==
Anwar Hossain was born in Sonapur, Shahrasti, Chandpur, East Bengal, Dominion of Pakistan (now in Chittagong, Bangladesh), on 5 May 1948. His father's name was MD Abdul Hoque and mother was Nur Jahan Begum. In 1965, he finished his SSC and in 1967, HSC from Faujdarhat Cadet College. He joined the Pakistan Army after studying for one year in East Pakistan University of Engineering and Technology.

== Career ==
Hossain joined the Pakistan Military Academy and was commission as a second lieutenant on 29 March 1970. He was posted to the 1st East Bengal Regiment under the 107 Infantry Brigade in Jessore Cantonment.

== Death and legacy ==
On 25 March 1971, The Pakistan Army launched Operation Searchlight and the Bangladesh Liberation War started. On 29 March 1971, 107 infantry brigade commander, Brigadier General Abdur Rahim Durrani, ordered the 1st East Bengal Regiment to be disarmed. The regiment was surrounded by 25 Baloch Regiment and 22 Frontier Force. The Bengal regiment led by Lieutenant Hafizuddin Ahmed and Hossain resisted. They fought against the West Pakistani troops and escaped Jessore Cantonment. Hossain was killed in the fighting. He was posthumously awarded Bir Uttom. The Shaheed Bir Uttam Lt. Anwar Girls School & College in Dhaka Cantonment was named after him.
