= Bangladesh International School & College =

Educational institute in Bangladesh operated by Bangladesh Army

Bangladesh International School and College

Location
- Dhaka; Bangladesh; 23.7813°N 90.3944°E

Information
- Type: International/National
- Motto: Rabbee Zidni ilma (My Lord, Increase Me In Knowledge)
- Established: 14 March 1995
- Principal: Brig Gen Md Rafiqul Islam (retd.)
- Grades: Nursery to Class XII
- Enrollment: 1,950
- Language: English
- Campus size: 1.60 Acres
- Website: bisc.com.bd

Bangladesh International School and College is a private school located in Mohakhali DOHS, Dhaka, Bangladesh. It is managed by the Bangladesh Army Station Headquarters, Dhaka Cantonment, Dhaka. The school was established in 1995 as a standard primary school, but the original plan was changed to an English medium school.

As of 2022, the chairman of the governing body is Brig General Md Rafiqul Islam, ndc, afwc, psc and the chief patron is Major General, Sheikh Mohammad Sarwar Hossain SUP, ndc, psc.

== History ==
The school was established on 14 March 1995 under the dynamic leadership of the founder Principal in Charge Mr. A K M Sufiur Rahman with only 27 students.

The first H.S.C national curriculum batch of students started in 2011 with 15 students. The batch was inaugurated on 17 September 2011 and the school was renamed Bangladesh International School and College.

== Academic year and curriculum ==
=== International curriculum ===
Students in this curriculum are prepared for SSC and HSC, O-level and A-level exams under Edexcel and Cambridge, UK.

=== National curriculum ===
The school started the national curriculum in 2006 (English version). In this curriculum, the students are prepared for the Secondary School Certificate and Higher Secondary Certificate examinations. The students used to sit the PECE exam in Class 5 and JSC in Class 8, but now according to the new curriculum, they don't have to. The students follow the textbooks, translated into English, and published by the National Board of Intermediate and Secondary Education in Bangladesh.

== See also ==
- List of schools in Bangladesh
