= Khan Firoz Ahmed =

Bangladeshi general

- Born: 10 April 1969 (age 57); Khulna, East Pakistan, Pakistan
- Education: Bangladesh Military Academy
- Military career
- Allegiance: Bangladesh
- Branch: Bangladesh Army
- Service years: 1990 - 2025
- Rank: Lieutenant General (Brevet)
- Unit: East Bengal Regiment
- Commands: Senior Directing Staff (Army-1) of National Defence College; Military Secretary of Army Headquarters; GOC of 7th Infantry Division; Commander of 97th Infantry Brigade; Commander of 88th Infantry Brigade; CO of 18th East Bengal Regiment
- Awards: Oshamanno Sheba Padak(OSP)

Khan Firoz Ahmed, OSP, ndc, afwc, psc, is a retired three-star general of the Bangladesh Army. He was appointed as senior directing staff (army-1) at National Defence College. Earlier, he was the military secretary at Army Headquarters, Dhaka Cantonment. He is also the incumbent president of Army Golf Club and chairman of Bangladesh Golf Academy.

== Career ==
Ahmed was the defence advisor to the Permanent Mission of Bangladesh to the United Nations, and during his tenure 12 Bangladeshi peacekeepers had been honored by the UN secretary general.

Ahmed also served as the defense advisor of the Bangladesh permanent mission to the UN from 2017 to 2020. He was promoted to the rank of major general on 2 December 2021.

Ahmed was the general officer commanding (GOC) of the 7th Infantry Division and area commander, Barishal Area, from 2 December 2021 to 27 August 2022.

Ahmed also served as acting adjutant general in January 2023. On 15 April 2025, Ahmed went to leave preparatory to retirement (LPR) thus retired from regular services of the army.

== Personal life ==
Ahmed is married and a father of a daughter and a son.

== See also ==
- List of serving generals of the Bangladesh Army
