= Sursoptok underpass =

Pedestrian underpass in Dhaka, Bangladesh

Sursoptok
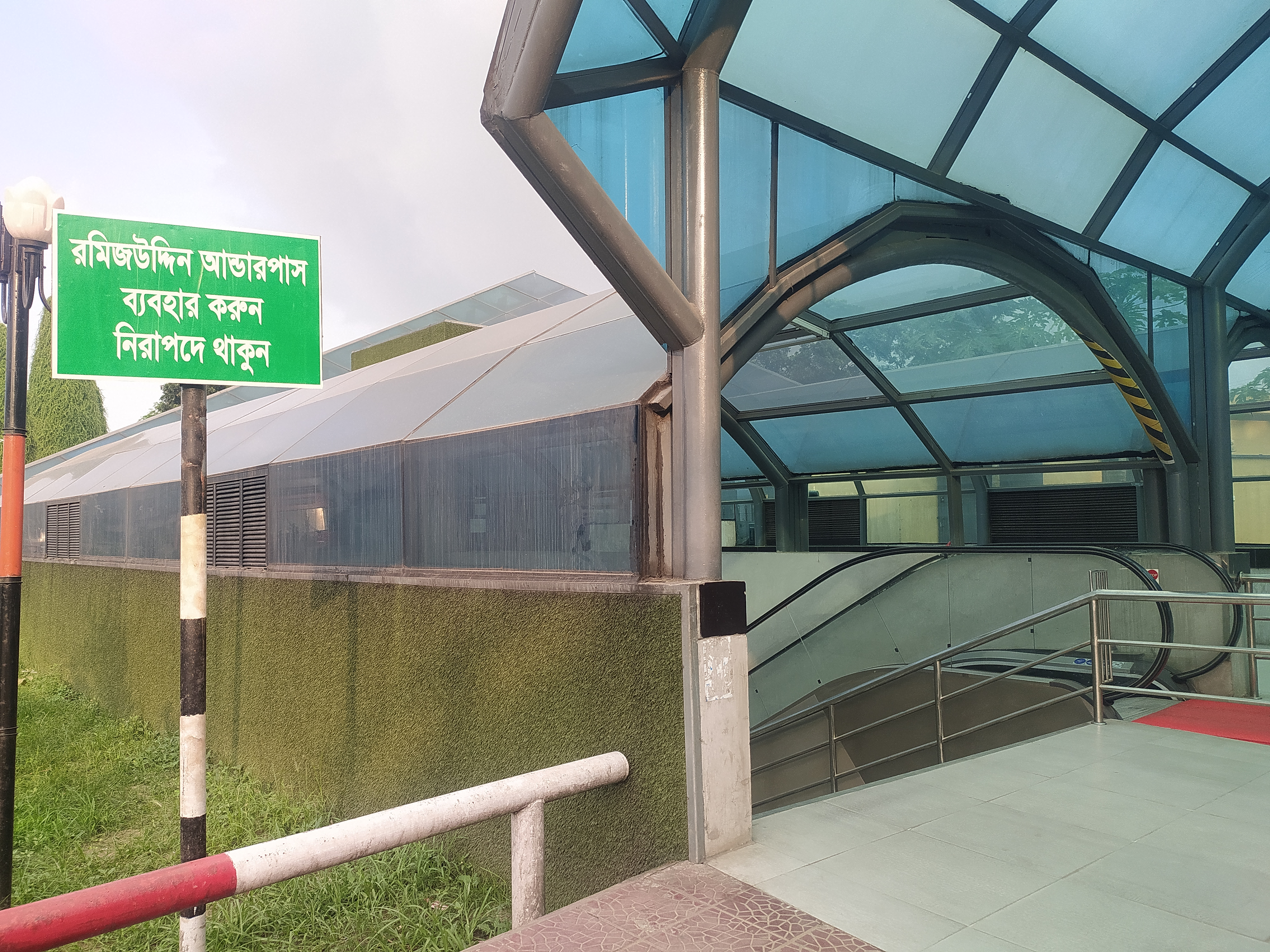
- Sursoptok in 2024
- Interactive map of Sursoptok

Overview
- Location: MES Square, Airport Road, Dhaka
- Coordinates: 23.8161°N 90.4056°E
- Status: open

Operation
- Work began: 12 August 2018
- Opened: 12 January 2022
- Owner: Dhaka North City Corporation
- Character: pedestrian tunnel

Technical
- Design engineer: 24th Engineer Brigade, Bangladesh Army
- Length: 42 m (138 ft)
- Tunnel clearance: 15 m (49 ft)

Sursoptok Underpass (Bengali: সুরসপ্তক আন্ডারপাস) is a pedestrian underpass located in Dhaka, Bangladesh. It is one of four underpasses in Dhaka. (Note: Others are Gulistan underpass, Gabtali underpass and Butterfly Cave.) The underpass with 15 meter high, 135 meters long, 5 meters, four 42 meter long tunnels is currently the largest underpass in Bangladesh. Prior to its construction, Gulistan underpass was the largest underpass in the country.

== Location ==
The underpass is located near Kurmitola General Hospital and Radisson Hotel at the MES square of Airport road, adjacent to Shaheed Ramiz Uddin Cantonment College in Dhaka.

== Background ==
The safe road movement started in 2018 after a road accident took the lives of two students in the underpass area. The government ordered the construction of underpass under the accident-prone road per the demands raised by the protesters. The underpass's construction was inaugurated in August, 14 days after the accident. Although the protesters requested that the underpass be named after the dead students, it was named Sursoptok in honor of the seven heroes. The underpass, delayed due to the corona outbreak, was inaugurated four years after construction began.

== Description ==
Box pushing technology was used in the underpass's construction by the 24 Engineer Brigade of Bangladesh Army. The construction cost for the underpass was Taka 57 crore, and it has a museum.
