= Shaheed Ramiz Uddin Cantonment College =

- শহীদ রমিজ উদ্দিন ক্যান্টনমেন্ট কলেজ

Location
- Zia Colony Road; Dhaka Cantonment; Dhaka, 1206; Bangladesh
- Coordinates: 23.8158°N 90.4032°E

Information
- Type: College
- Established: 1939
- School board: Board of Intermediate and Secondary Education, Dhaka
- Authority: Department of Military Lands and Cantonments, Ministry of Defence
- School number: 107857 (EIIN)
- Chairperson: Brigadier General Khaled Shams, NDC, PSC
- Principal: SM Nazrul Islam
- Faculty: 50+
- Grades: H.S.C
- Enrolment: 3,000
- Campus size: 5 acres
- Campus type: Urban
- Publication: Proteetee, Neutrino
- Website: srcc.edu.bd

Shaheed Ramiz Uddin Cantonment College (Bengali: শহীদ রমিজ উদ্দিন ক্যান্টনমেন্ট কলেজ), also known as SRCC, is an educational institution in Dhaka, Bangladesh, adjacent to Sursoptok underpass. It is managed by the Bangladesh Army, primarily for the children of army personnel, but students from civilian families can also study in this college.

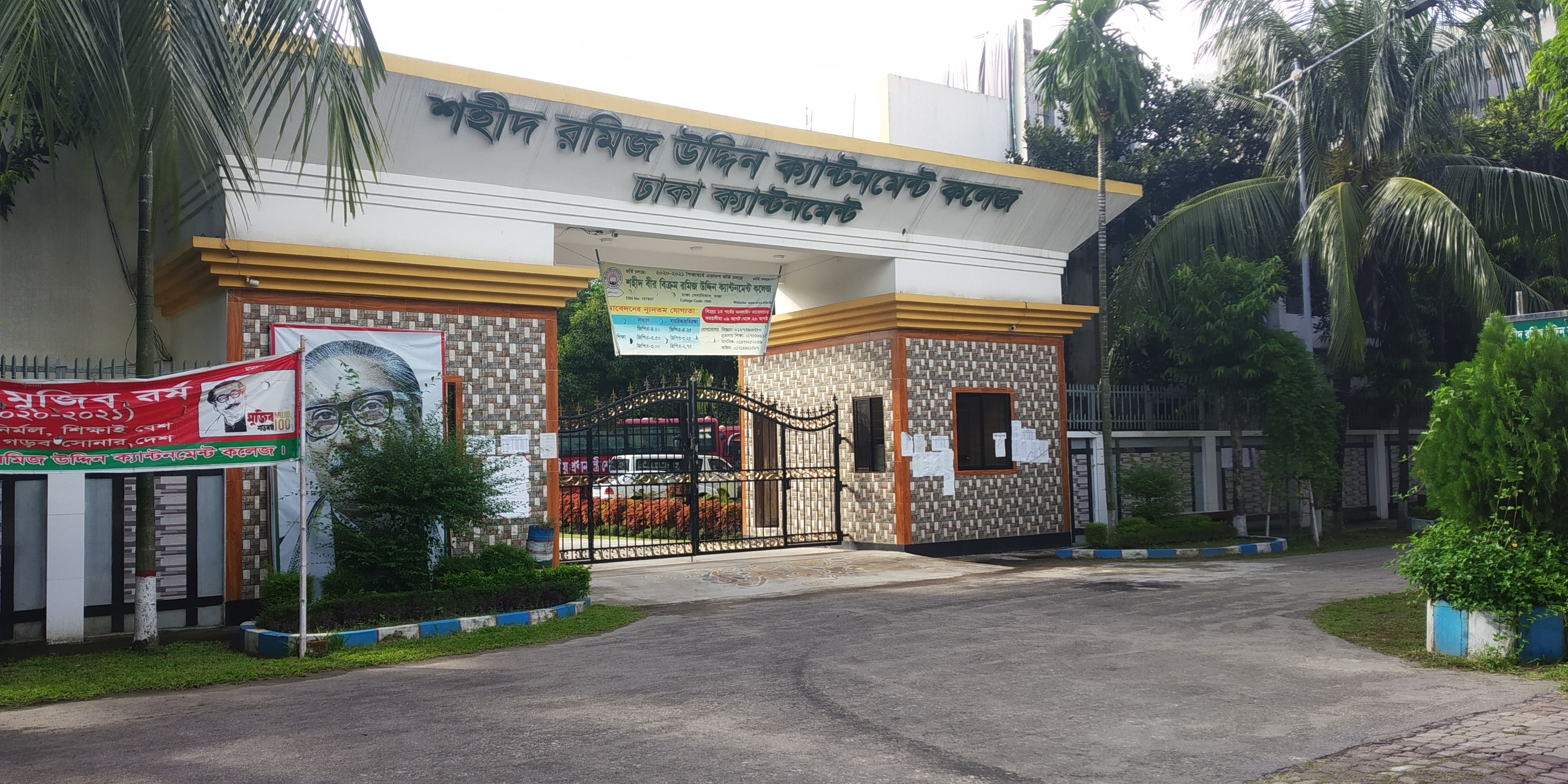
Gate of the college

== History ==
On 29 July 2018, two students from the college died and seven were injured in a road accident on Airport Road, Dhaka. The incident impelled students to demand safer roads and stricter traffic laws, and the demonstrations rapidly spread throughout Bangladesh.

== Gallery ==
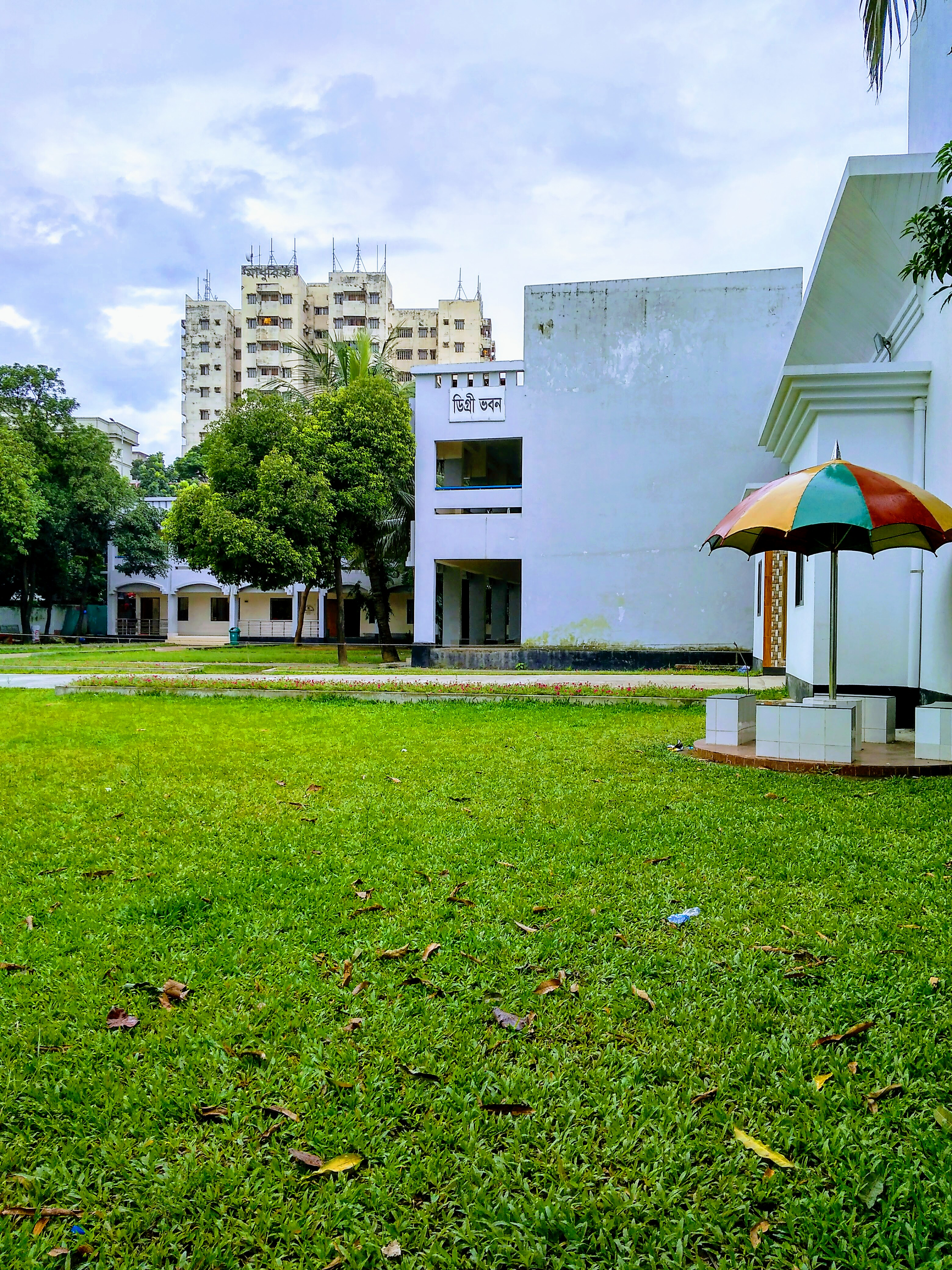
Part of the degree building of Shaheed Ramiz Uddin Cantonment College

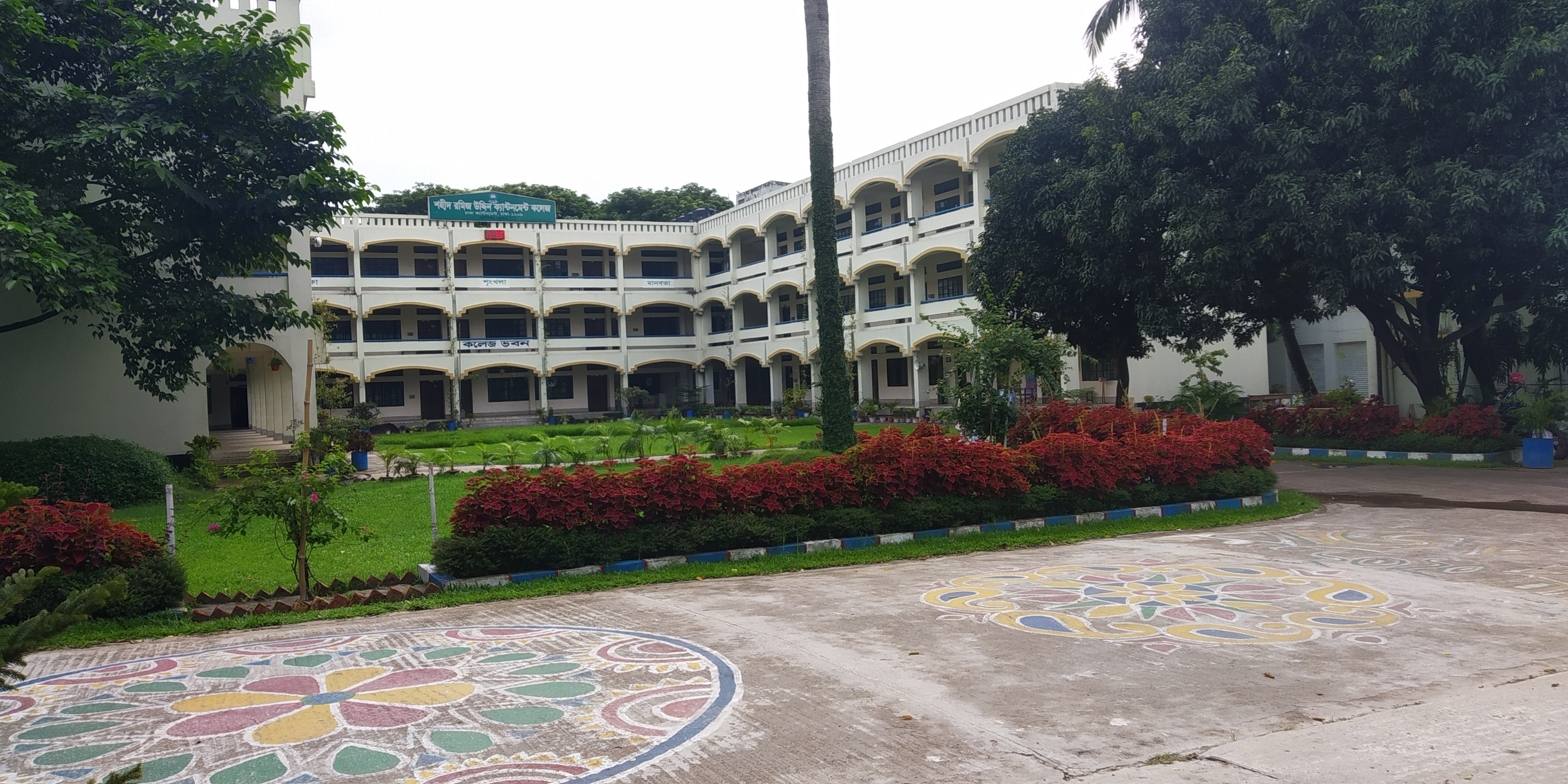
Main building of Shaheed Ramiz Uddin Cantonment College (from Degree Building)

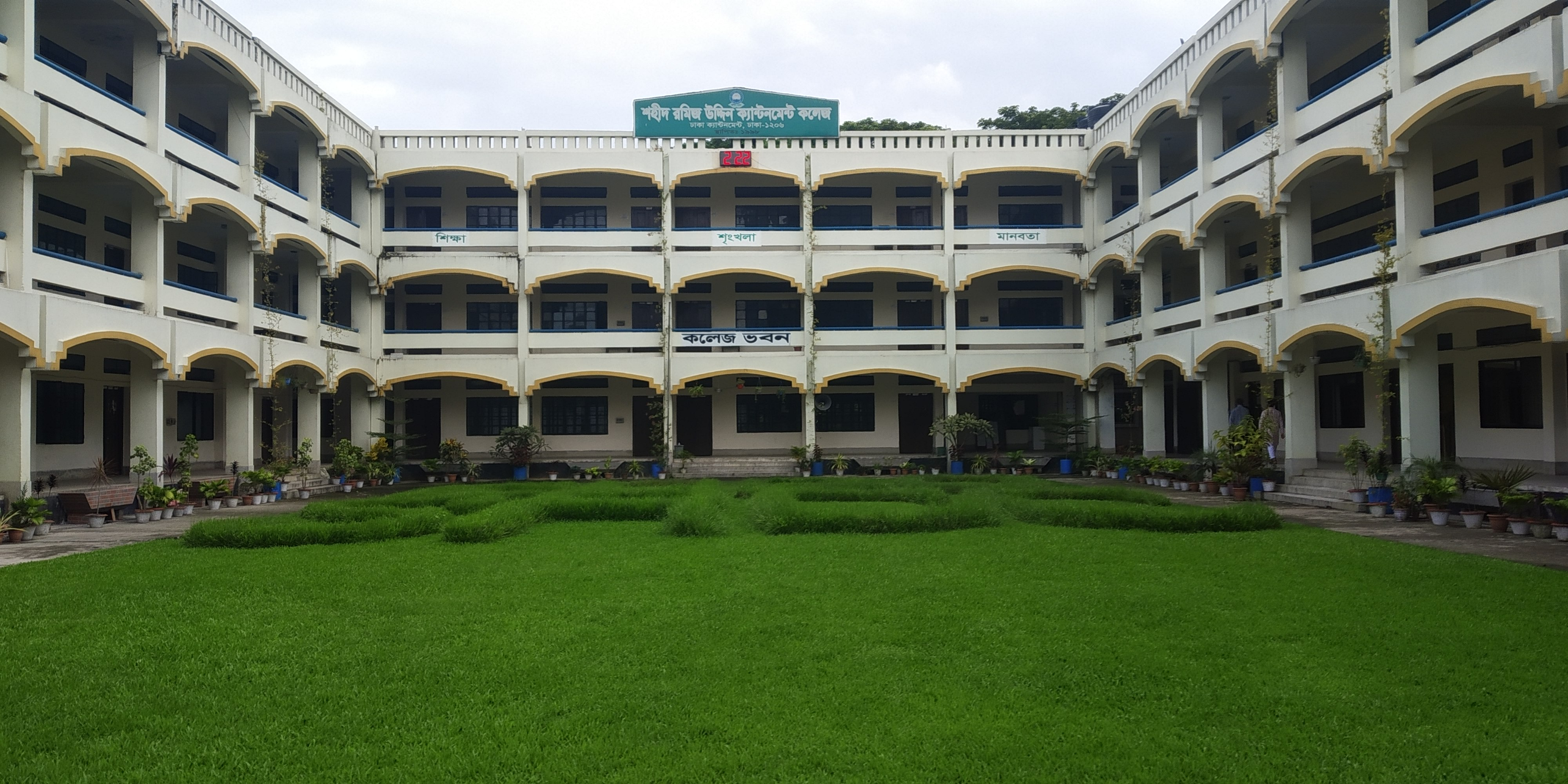
Main building of the college

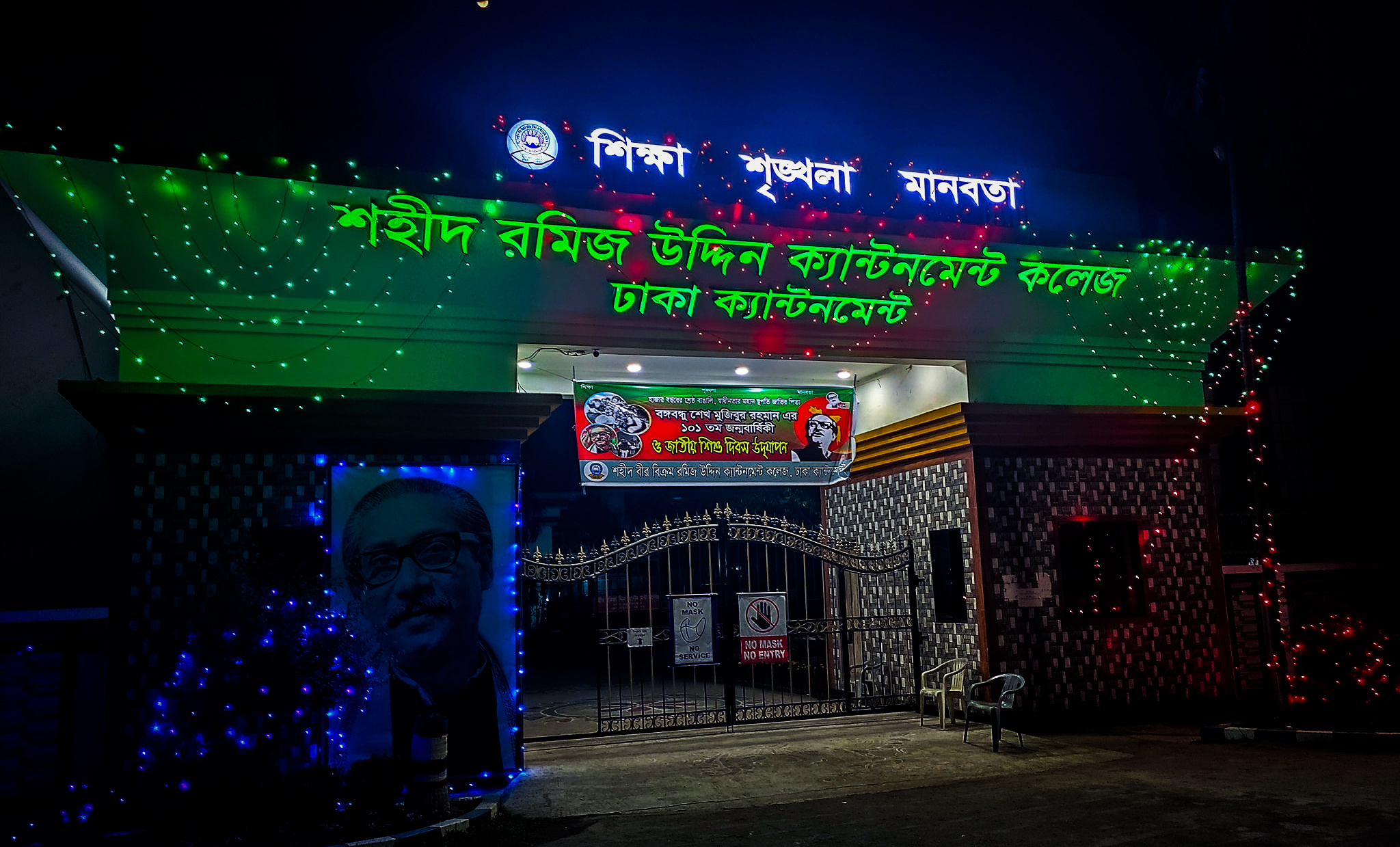
The main college gate at night

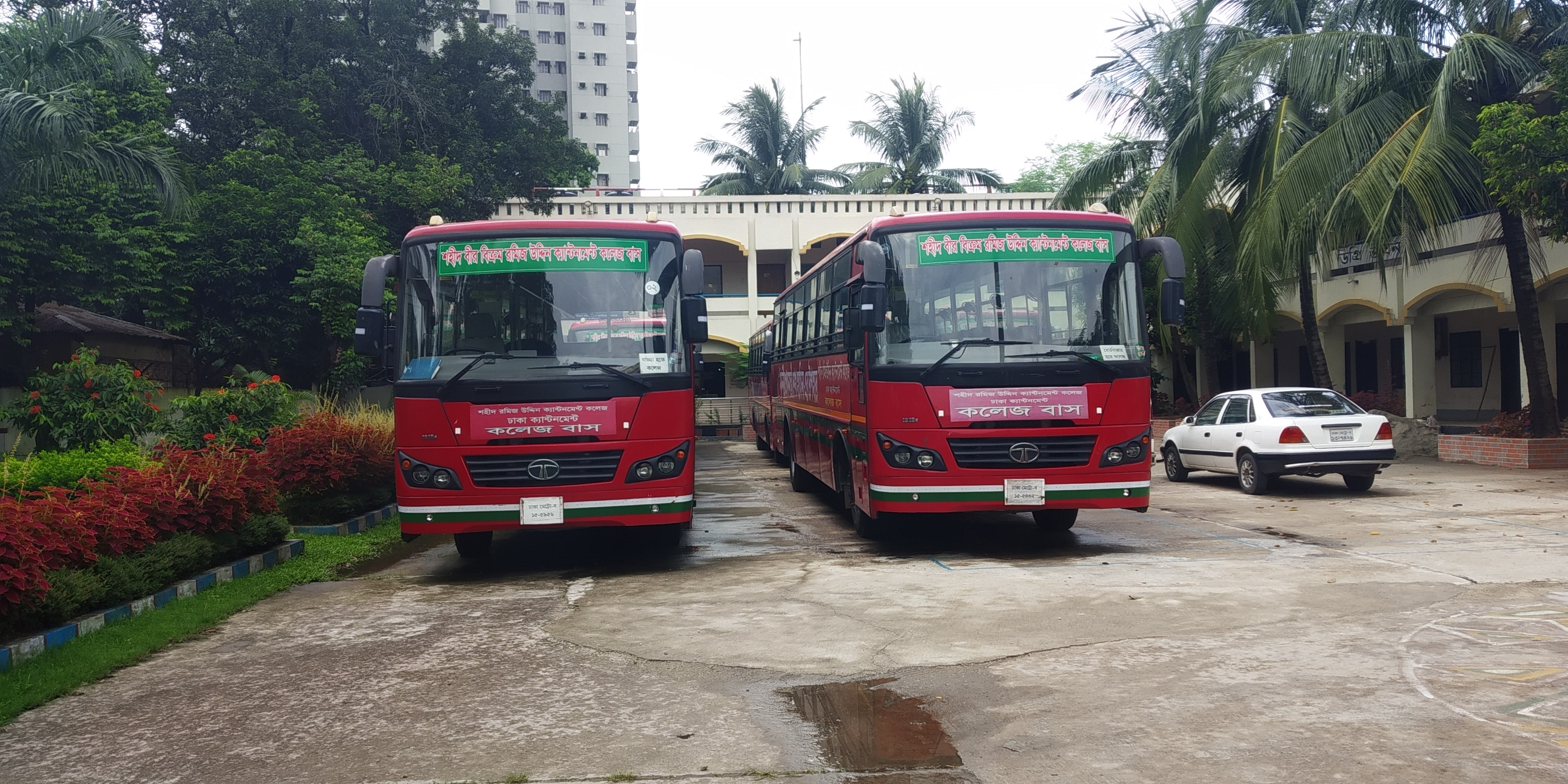
The college buses

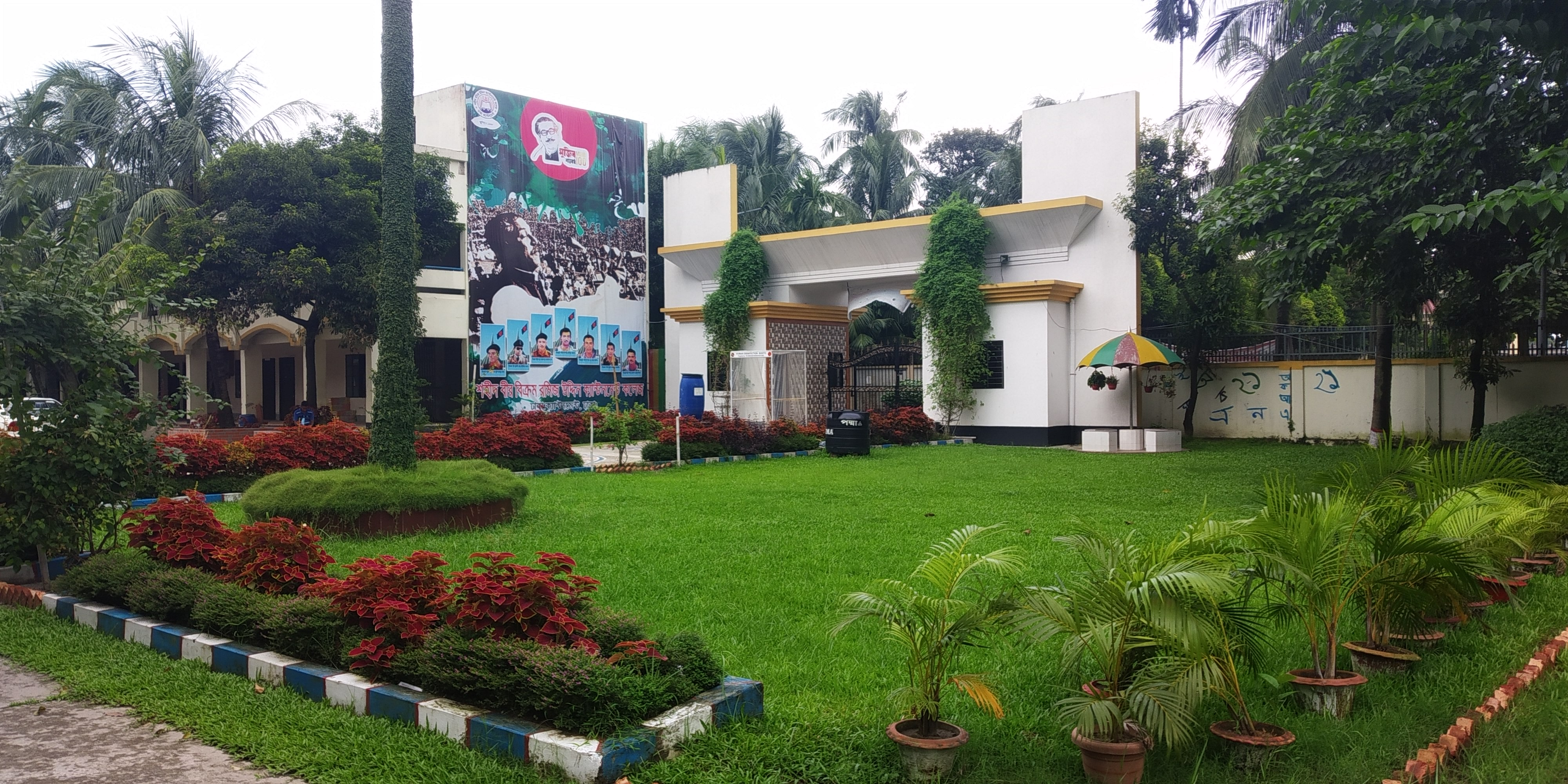
Entrance and exit gate

== See also ==
- 2018 Bangladesh road-safety protests
