= Siraj-Khaleda Memorial Cantonment Board General Hospital =

Hospital in Dhaka Cantonment

Coordinates: 23.7990°N 90.3936°E

Siraj-Khaleda Memorial Cantonment Board General Hospital is a government general hospital in Dhaka Cantonment with 100 beds and 26 cabins. Inaugurated by Former Prime Minister of Bangladesh Sheikh Hasina, the hospital was constructed by Siraj-Khaleda Trust on 13 March, 2012.

== History ==
Dhaka Cantonment Board operates it to provide health services to the civilians living in the cantonment in accordance with the provisions of Section 96 (e) of the Cantonment Act 2018. During COVID-19 pandemic, Summit Corporation Ltd and its partner Jera donated an ambulance with high-flow nasal oxygen equipment to SKMCB.

The hospital is named after Lieutenant Colonel Sirajul Karim Khan and Mrs. Khaleda Karim Khan by the trust founded by their children which is headed by Mohammed Aziz Khan and Faruk Khan.
