= Gulistan underpass =

Pedestrian underpass in Dhaka, Bangladesh

Coordinates: 23.7249°N 90.4120°E

Gulistan underpass (Bengali: গুলিস্তান আন্ডারপাস) is a pedestrian underpass in Dhaka. It is currently the second largest underpass in Bangladesh after the launch of Sursoptok underpass. Located in Gulistan, it has been serving the people since 1997. Completed at a cost of Taka 34.3 million, the underpass tunnel houses a market for selling products.

A variety of electronic products are sold in this underground market with 104 shops. Due to various problems, people are not seen using it so much. It has access to multiple entry and exit points. It closes at eight o'clock at night.
