= Adamjee Cantonment Public School =

School in Dhaka, Bangladesh

- আদমজী ক্যান্টনমেন্ট পাবলিক স্কুল
- Seal of Adamjee Cantonment Public School

Location
- Dhaka Cantonment, Dhaka; 1206; Bangladesh; 23.7940°N 90.3932°E

Information
- School type: Primary and Secondary
- Motto: Bengali: শিক্ষা, শৃঙ্খলা, চরিত্র (Education, Discipline, Character)
- Established: 16 February 1960; 66 years ago
- Founder: Gul Muhammad Adamjee
- School board: Board of Intermediate and Secondary Education, Dhaka
- School district: Dhaka
- Authority: Bangladesh Army
- School code: 1250
- Chairman: Brigadier General Syed Ashiqur Rahman, SPP, PBGM, nwc, psc.
- Principal: Lt Colonel Md Ziaur Rahman, psc, G.
- Staff: 120
- Faculty: Science and Business Studies
- Teaching staff: 268
- Grades: I-X
- Gender: Male
- Language: Bengali & English
- Campus size: 5.00 acres (2.02 ha)
- Campus type: Urban
- Houses: Fazlur Rahman Khan House; Dr. Ibrahim House; Kaykobad House; Zainul Abedin House
- Colors: White (Shirt); Navy Blue (Sweater, Bangla Medium); Red (Sweater, English Version); Navy Blue (Trousers, Bangla Medium); Ash (Trousers, English Version)
- Nickname: ACPS
- Publication: প্রসূন
- Demonym: Adamjeean
- EIIN: 107843
- Website: www.acps.edu.bd

Adamjee Cantonment Public School (Bengali: আদমজী ক্যান্টনমেন্ট পাবলিক স্কুল) is a boys school situated in Dhaka Cantonment, Dhaka, Bangladesh. It is managed by the Bangladesh Army. The running principal's name is Lt Col Md Ziaur Rahman, psc, G.

== History ==
Adamjee Cantonment Public School was established in 1960. At that time, it followed the curriculum of British Public School and offered education in only six classes, from class four to nine. George Dolman, a British educationist, was the first principal of the school. Subsequently, with further expansion of the institution, it was converted into a college and was named as Adamjee Cantonment College. In 1995, the school section was totally bifurcated and shifted to its present location and its original name "Adamjee Cantonment Public School" was reinstated.

== Location and infrastructure ==
The school is located in the heart of Dhaka Cantonment, on 5.00 acres of land. The school is housed in two buildings: six storied and five storied.These buildings are known as 'BLOCK A' and 'BLOCK B'. There is a library in the top floor of the 'BLOCK A', where students can read and study at peace. There is also an auditorium at top of the 'BLOCK B'. Mainly all the cultural and religious events are organised here. There are two big fields for children to play as well as a playground. A mosque has also been constructed for performing prayer. There are also canteens for students to buy their tiffins and other necessary items.

== Academics ==
Adamjee Cantonment Public School is a two-shift institution with approximately 7,500 students. It consists of both morning and day shifts, covering classes from grade one to ten. The day shift, which was previously discontinued, was reintroduced in 2013. The school offers education in both the Bangla medium and the English version. In the morning shift, both Bangla medium and English version classes are available from grades one to ten, while the day shift offers education in the Bangla medium up to grade ten. In 2025, the day shift also began to offer education in English as well. The institution provides study opportunities in both Science and Business Studies streams.

== Houses ==
=== Fazlur Rahman Khan House ===
Fazlur Rahman Khan was an internationally renowned architect. He designed the Sears Tower, located in Chicago, USA, which was established in 1973. This tower is considered a marvel in the world of architecture. In honor of his memory, this house has been named Fazlur Rahman House.

The house flag features a white monogram on a red background. It is managed by two housemasters along with twelve teacher members.

=== Dr. Ibrahim House ===
Dr. Muhammad Ibrahim was a pioneer in diabetes treatment in Bangladesh. To provide quality care for this chronic disease, he established the BIRDEM in Dhaka. Today, BIRDEM has branches across the country, offering medical care to underprivileged and needy patients.

In recognition of his outstanding contributions to the medical field, a house was named Ibrahim House in his honor. The house flag features a white monogram on a blue background. It is managed by two housemasters along with twelve teacher members.

=== Kaykobad House ===
In modern Bengali literature, Mohakobi Munshi Kaykobad (1857–1951) was a pioneer among Muslim poets. His real name was Mohammad Kazem Al-Qureshi. He wrote literature based on Islamic heritage and history. His most famous epic poem is "Mahashmashan" (1904). Among Muslim poets, he is the only one to have written an epic.

Some of his other notable works include "Birahabilap," "Kusumkanan," "Asrumala," "Shibmandir," and "Amiyadhara." In honor of this renowned poet, a house was named Kaykobad House. The house flag features a white monogram on a green background. It is managed by two housemasters along with twelve teacher members.

=== Zainul Abedin House ===
Shilpacharya Zainul Abedin was a renowned artist of the Indian subcontinent. He was born on December 29, 1914, in Mymensingh, Bangladesh. In 1948, he established the Government Art Institute, which is now the Faculty of Fine Arts at the University of Dhaka. His extraordinary artworks have been admired both nationally and internationally, often leaving viewers in awe.

One of his most famous works depicts the horrors of the Bengal Famine of 1943. Additionally, in Sonargaon, the ancient capital of Bengal, he founded an art college and a folk art museum. In honor of this legendary artist, a house has been named Zainul Abedin House.

The house flag features a white monogram on an orange background. It is managed by two housemasters along with twelve teacher members.
