= BAF Shaheen English Medium College =

English medium educational institution in Dhaka, Bangladesh

- বিএএফ শাহীন ইংলিশ মিডিয়াম কলেজ
- Seal of BAF SEMC

Location
- BAF Base Bashar, Dhaka Cantonment, Tejgoan; Dhaka, 1206; Bangladesh; 23°46′38.3″N 90°23′32.6″E

Information
- Other name: BAF SEMC
- Former name: BAF Shaheen English Medium School
- Type: English medium
- Motto: Education • Honesty • Discipline
- Established: 1992
- Founder: Bangladesh Air Force
- School board: Cambridge Assessment International Education
- School district: Dhaka
- Authority: Bangladesh Air Force
- Chairman: Air Vice Marshal Mohammad Khair Ul Afsar, GUP, ndc, psc AOC, BSR
- Principal: Group Captain Taslim Ahmed, psc
- Grades: Standard 1 - A Level
- Gender: Boys & Girls
- Age range: 6-18
- Language: English
- Hours in school day: 4-6
- Campus type: urban
- Sports: Football, Cricket, Basketball, Volleyball, Table tennis, Badminton, Handball, Hockey, Indoor Sports
- Newspaper: NEWS SEMC
- Website: bafsemc.edu.bd

BAF Shaheen English Medium College (Bengali: বিএএফ শাহীন ইংলিশ মিডিয়াম কলেজ), commonly known as BAF SEMC, is an English-medium school and college located in Dhaka, Bangladesh. Under the direct supervision of the Bangladesh Air Force, its education is based on Cambridge International Examinations, UK. Students at BAF SEMC began taking the O-Level test administered by London University in 1998. It is located on the premises of BAF Base Bashar, Dhaka Cantonment next to the BAF Shaheen College Dhaka.

== History ==
When BAF Shaheen English Medium College (SEMC) was founded in 1992, it had 150 students, six classrooms from kindergarten to fourth grade, and seven teachers. By adding one class every year, SEMC has gradually increased the size of its program. As the school began offering secondary education (A-level) in 2019, the name of the institution changed from BAF Shaheen English Medium School (BAF SEMS) to BAF Shaheen English Medium College (BAF SEMC). As of October 2020, there are around 1600 students enrolled in grades I through XII as a whole. From June 2022 sessions on, BAF SEMC began serving as an exam venue for the British Council Bangladesh for Cambridge school examinations.
