= Department of Military Lands and Cantonments =

Bangladesh government department

- Bengali: সামরিক ভূমি ও ক্যান্টনমেন্ট অধিদপ্তর
- Government Seal of Bangladesh

Agency overview
- Formed: 1970; 56 years ago
- Type: Government Organisation
- Jurisdiction: Government of Bangladesh
- Headquarters: Dhaka Cantonment, Dhaka
- Director General responsible: Shamim Ahmmed
- Child agency: Cantonment Board
- Website: dmlc.gov.bd

Department of Military Lands and Cantonments is the government department responsible for the land management of cantonments in Bangladesh. Shamim Ahmed is the current Director General of Department of Military Lands and Cantonments.

== History ==
Department of Military Lands and Cantonments was established on 15 August 1970 in Dhaka as a Directorate. It was fully upgraded to a department in 1982. The department manages the lands through three circles. The circles are North circle in Bogra, Central circle in Dhaka, and Eastern circle in Chittagong. Each cantonment is managed by a cantonment board.

On 20 April 2009, the Department of Military Lands and Cantonments sent a notice to Khaleda Zia, former Prime Minister of Bangladesh, to evict her cantonment residence which was given to her after the assassination of her husband, President Ziaur Rahman. Khaledia Zia challenged the notice at Bangladesh High court which ruled against her, stating that the allotment of the house inside Dhaka cantonment was illegal. On 14 November 2010, she vacated her house in Dhaka Cantonment.

== List of Cantonment boards ==
- Dhaka Cantonment Board
- Comilla Cantonment Board
- Savar Cantonment Board
- Chittagong Cantonment Board
- Jessore Cantonment Board
- Bogra Cantonment Board
- Gazipur Cantonment Board
- Rangpur Cantonment Board
- Saidpur Cantonment Board
- Rajshahi Cantonment Board
- Qadirabad Cantonment Board
- Jahanabad Cantonment Board
- Jalalabad Cantonment Board
- Mymensingh Cantonment Board
- Shahid Salahuddin Cantonment Board

== Affiliated Educational Institutions ==
Cantonment Board	Name	Short name	Established	location	website
Dhaka Cantonment Board	Shaheed Ramiz Uddin Cantonment College	SRCC	5 October 1998 AD.	Dhaka Cantonment, Dhaka-1206	srcc.edu.bd
Dhaka Cantonment Board	Shaheed Bir Bikram Ramiz Uddin Cantonment School	SBBRCS	1939 AD	Dhaka Cantonment, Dhaka-1206	
Dhaka Cantonment Board	Muslim Modern Academy		1963 AD	Dhaka Cantonment, Dhaka-1206	mmaacademy.edu.bd
Dhaka Cantonment Board	Dhaka Cantonment Board Adarsh Vidya Niketan	DCBABIN	February 1979 AD.	Manikadi, Dhaka Cantonment, Dhaka-1206	dcbabn.edu.bd
Dhaka Cantonment Board	Senapally High School		1982 AD	Mirpur-14, Dhaka Cantonment, Dhaka	
Dhaka Cantonment Board	Riverview Cantonment Board School		2001 AD	Postgola Cantonment, Dhaka-1204	
Dhaka Cantonment Board	Cantonment Board High School, Mirpur			Mirpur Cantonment, Dhaka	
Chittagong Cantonment Board	Chittagong Cantonment Board High School	CCBHS		Chittagong Cantonment, Chittagong	
Chittagong Cantonment Board	Bayezid Bostami Cantonment Board High School			Chittagong Cantonment, Chittagong	
Chittagong Cantonment Board	Jahangir Line High School			Chittagong Cantonment, Chittagong	
Chittagong Cantonment Board	Bangladesh Military Academy High School			Bangladesh Military Academy, Bhatiari, Chittagong	
Chittagong Cantonment Board	Shaheed Lt. GM Mushfique Bir Uttam High School			Halishahar, Chittagong	
Comilla Cantonment Board	Cantonment College, Comilla	CCC		Comilla Cantonment, Comilla	ccc.edu.bd
Comilla Cantonment Board	Cantonment Board Boys High School			Comilla Cantonment	
Comilla Cantonment Board	Cantonment Board Girls High School			Comilla Cantonment	
Comilla Cantonment Board	Cantonment Board Secondary School, Comilla Cantonment			Comilla Cantonment	
Bogra Cantonment Board	Bogra Cantonment Board High School			Bogra cantonment	
Bogra Cantonment Board	Cantonment Board High School Jahangirabad		1984 AD	Bogra Cantonment, Bogra	
Jessore Cantonment Board	Dawood Public School and College	DPSC	3 September 1959	Jessore Cantonment, Jessore	dpsc.edu.bd
Jessore Cantonment Board	Cantonment High School, Jessore		1982 AD	Jessore Cantonment, Jessore	chsjsr.edu.bd
Jessore Cantonment Board	Cantonment Board Lower Secondary School			Jessore Cantonment	
Savar Cantonment Board	Savar Cantonment Board Boys High School	SCBBHS	1979 AD	Savar Cantonment, Dhaka	
Savar Cantonment Board	Savar Cantonment Board Girls High School	SCBGHS		Savar Cantonment, Savar, Dhaka	scbghs.edu.bd
Gazipur Cantonment Board	Gazipur Cantonment Board High School		1968 AD	BOF, Gazipur Cantonment	
Gazipur Cantonment Board	Gazipur Cantonment Board Girls High School			BOF, Gazipur Cantonment	
Gazipur Cantonment Board	Cantonment Board High School, Rajendrapur			Rajendrapur Cantonm	
Jahanabad Cantonment Board	Cantonment Public School, Jahanabad Cantonment, Khulna				cpsk.edu.bd
Rajshahi Cantonment Board	Rajshahi Cantonment Board School and College	RCBSC	1986 AD	Rajshahi Cantonment, Rajshahi-6202	rcbsc.edu.bd
Mymensingh Cantonment Board	Cantonment Board High School, Momenshahi Cantonment		15 July 1990	Momenshahi Cantonment	cbhsmym.edu.bd
Ghatail Cantonment Board	Cantonment Board High School, Ghatail, Tangail	CBHSGT	1984 AD	Shaheed Salahuddin Cantonment, Ghatail, Tangail	cbhsgt.edu.bd
Jalalabad Cantonment Board	Jalalabad Cantonment Board High School	JCBHS	1980 AD	Jalalabad Cantonment, Sylhet	www.jcbhs.edu.bd
Cantonment Board Girls High School, Rangpur		1 January 1995	Rangpur Cantonment, Rangpur	cbghsrangpur.edu.bd	
Cantonment Board High School, Bir Uttam Shaheed Mahbub Cantonment		1994 AD	Bir Uttam Shaheed Mahbub Cantonment, Parvatipur, Dinajpur	cbhsbusms.edu.bd	
Saiddpur Cantonment Board	Saidpur Cantonment Board High School			Syedpur Cantonment, Syedpur, Nilphamari, 5310	
Qadirabad Cantonment Board	Mahmudul Hasan Primary School, Qadirabad Cantonment			Qadirabad Cantonment	
Qadirabad Cantonment Board	Qadirabad Cantonment Public School	QCPS		Kadirabad Cantonment, Dayarampur, Bagatipara, Natore	
Qadirabad Cantonment Board	Qadirabad Cantonment Sapper College	QCSC	1995 AD	Qadirabad Cantonment, Natore	qcsc.edu.bd
