= Airport Road, Dhaka =

Street in Dhaka, Bangladesh

Coordinates: 23°49′2.31″N 90°24′44.65″E

Airport Road
- Tongi division Road
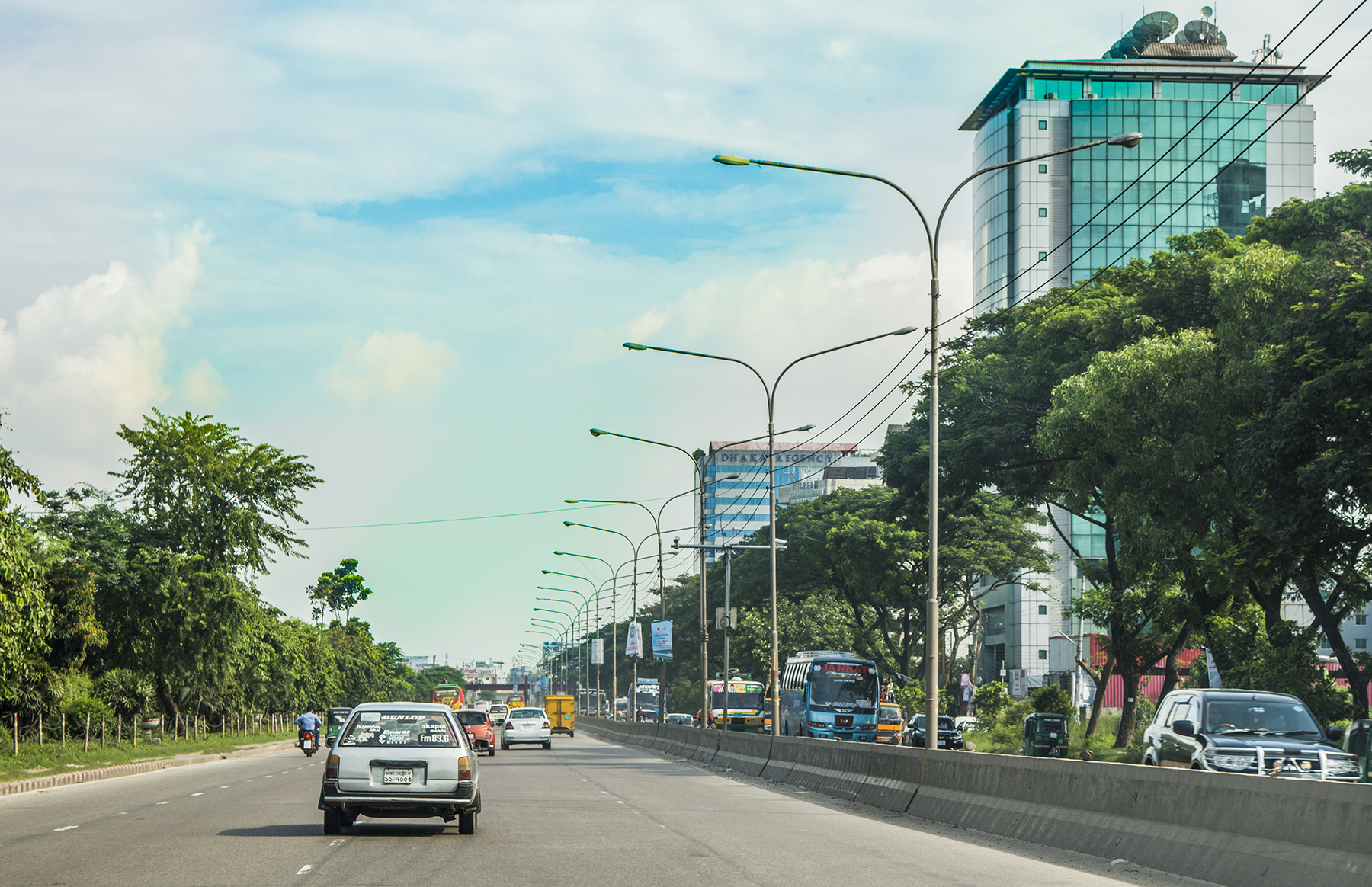
- Airport road at Uttara
- Interactive map of Airport Road
- Native name: বিমানবন্দর সড়ক (Bengali)
- Part of: N3
- Maintained by: Dhaka North City Corporation
- Length: 15 km (9.3 mi)
- Location: Dhaka
- South end: Bijoy Sarani Intersection
- North end: Abdullahpur Junction

Airport Road (Bengali: বিমানবন্দর সড়ক), also known as Tongi Division Road, a part of the Dhaka-Mymensingh Highway (N3), is an 8-lane major artery road in Dhaka, that connects Dhaka city, with the Shahjalal International Airport. It is also the main artery that connects Dhaka with the northern suburb of Uttara and the only road connection between Dhaka and northern Districts of Bangladesh. Traffic is fairly smooth throughout the road, due to flyovers and interchanges.

== Facilities ==
The road was built as a highway to facilitate movement with northern districts of Bangladesh. The 8-lane highway (4 lanes on each side) is one of the best maintained roads in Bangladesh, It has a divider; however it doesn't have a shoulder for emergency and breakdown.

== Landmarks ==
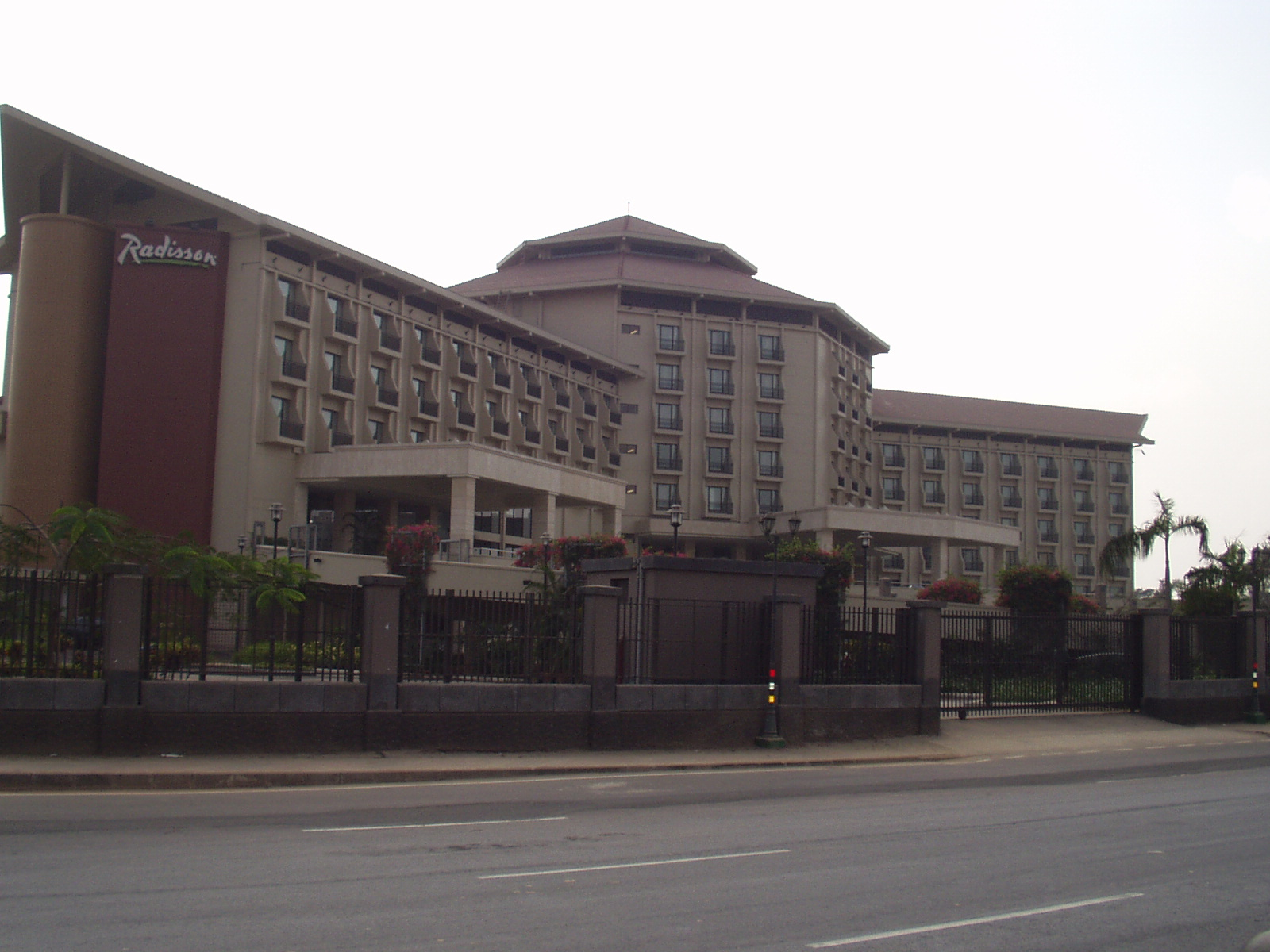
Radisson Blu Dhaka Water Garden is located on the Airport Road

- Shahjalal International Airport
- Balaka Bhaban, Kurmitola
- Airport Railway Station
- Bangladesh Navy Headquarters
- Dhaka Cantonment
- Dhaka Cantonment railway station
- Radisson Blu Water Garden Hotel
- Best Western Dhaka
- Le Meridien Dhaka
- Dusit Thani Princess Dhaka
- Dhaka Regency
- Army Golf Club
- Bangladesh Golf Federation
- Heroes Live Forever Monument
- Nikunja 1 & 2 (Joyar Shara Residential area)

== Gallery ==
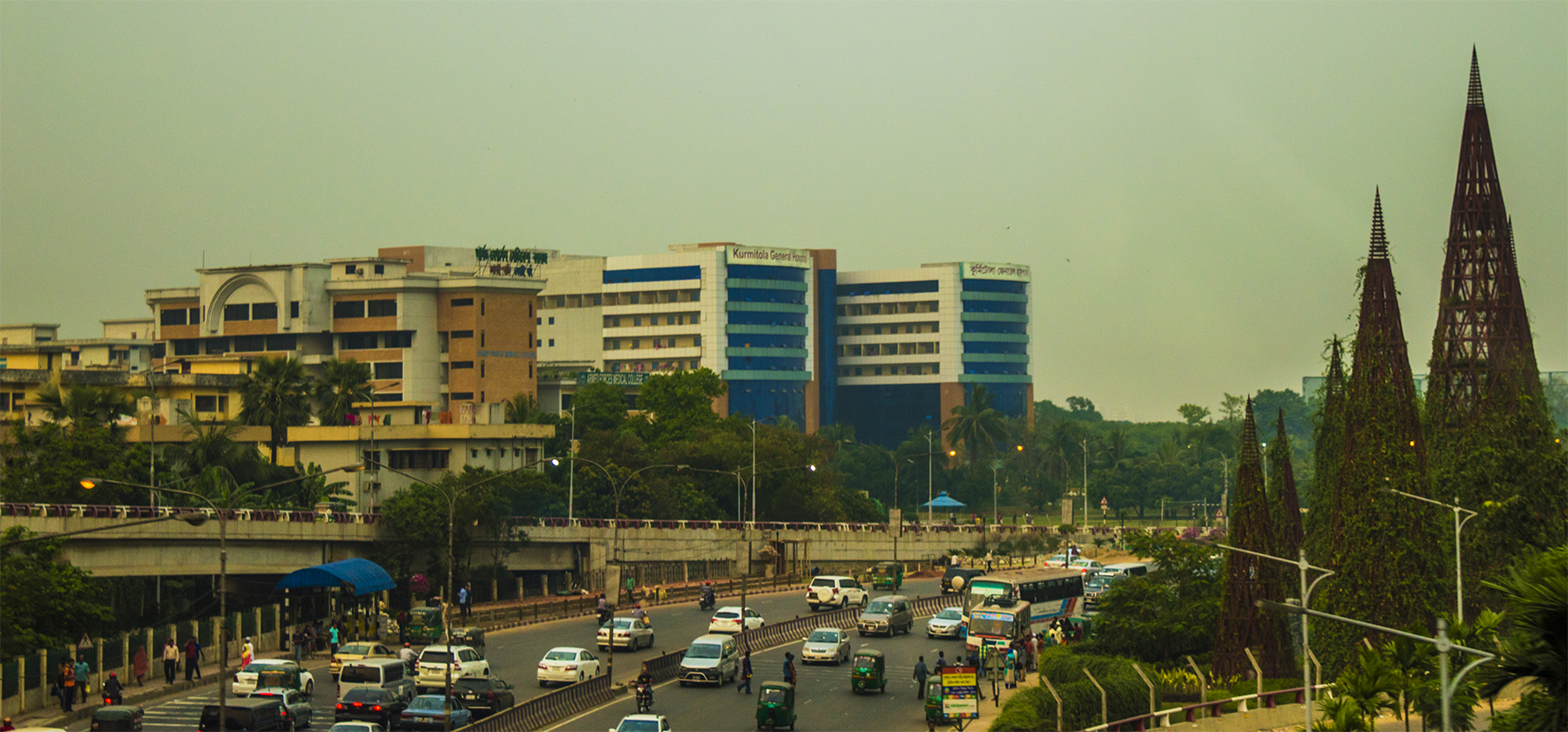
Banani area of Airport Road

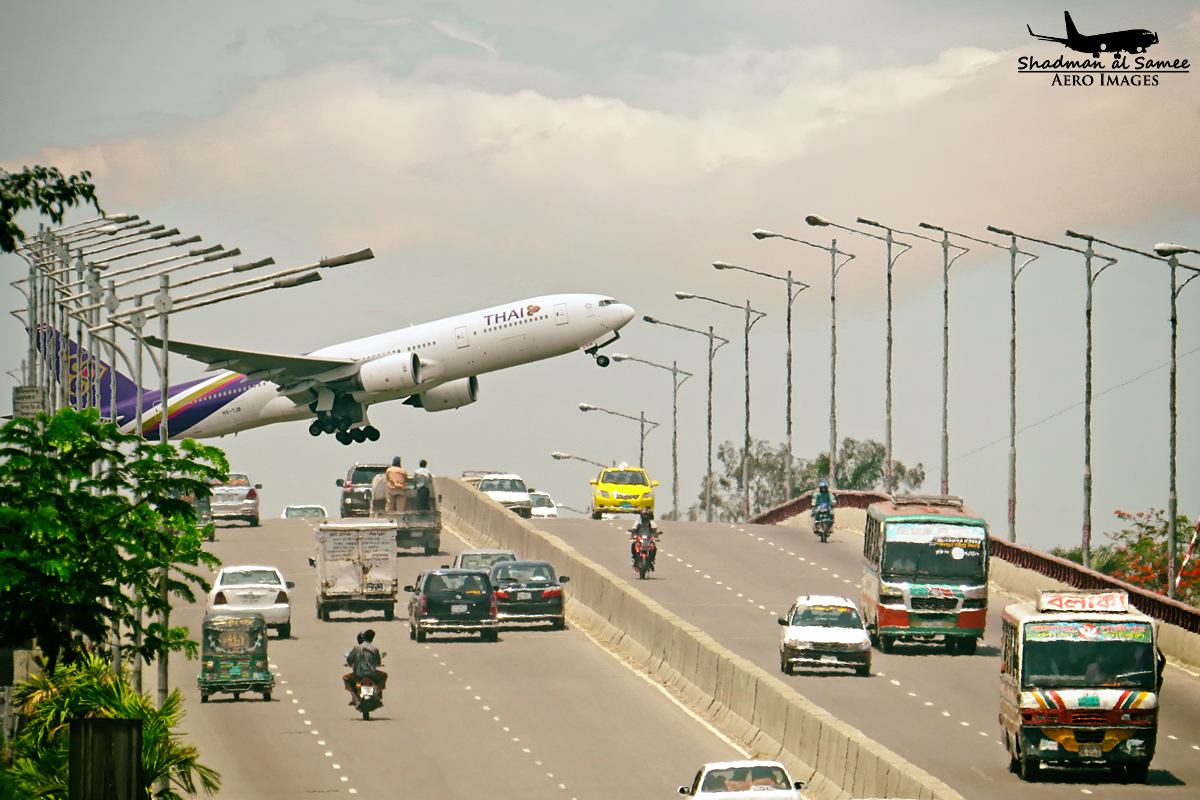
Banani overpass Dhaka

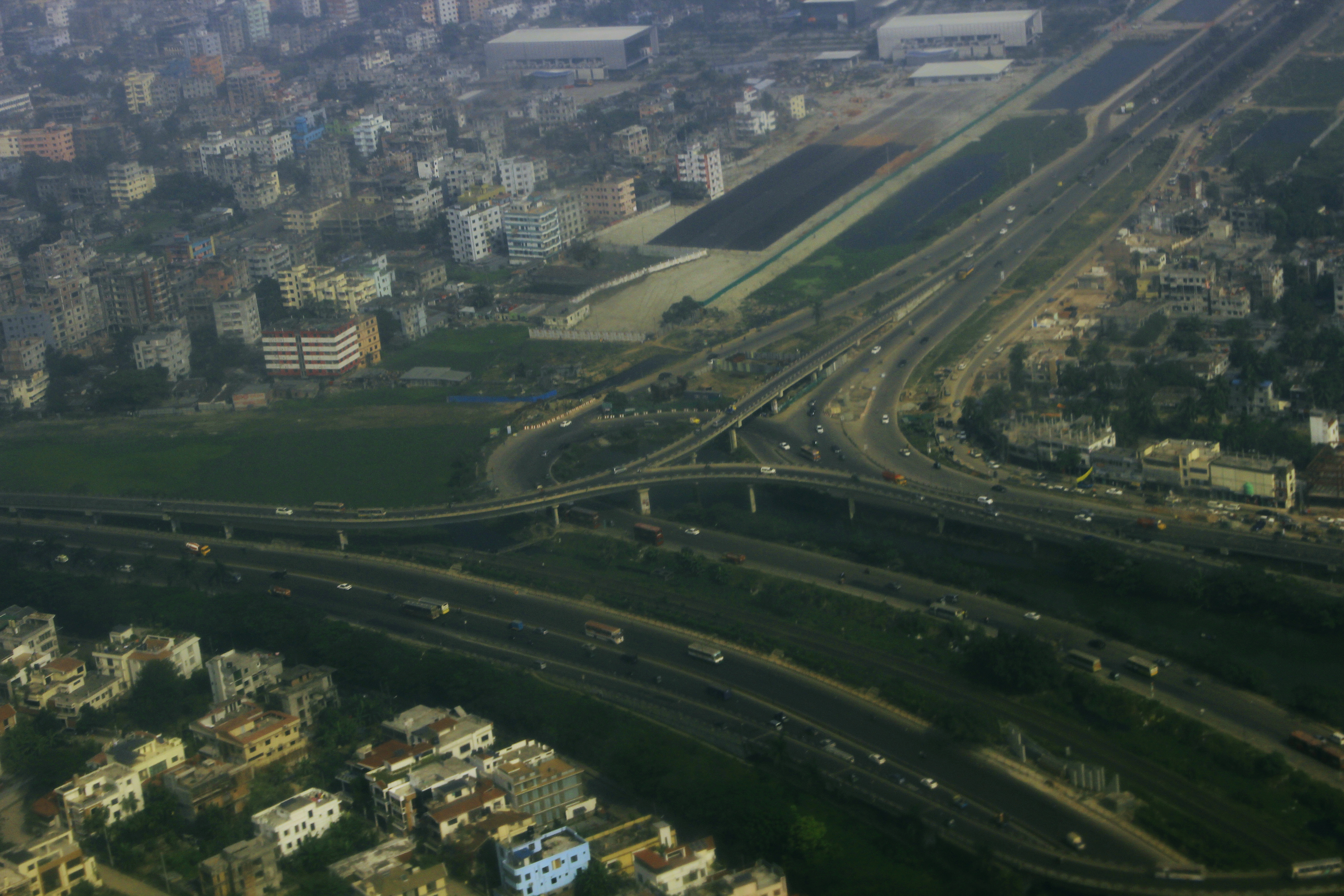
Kuril Flyover on Airport Road

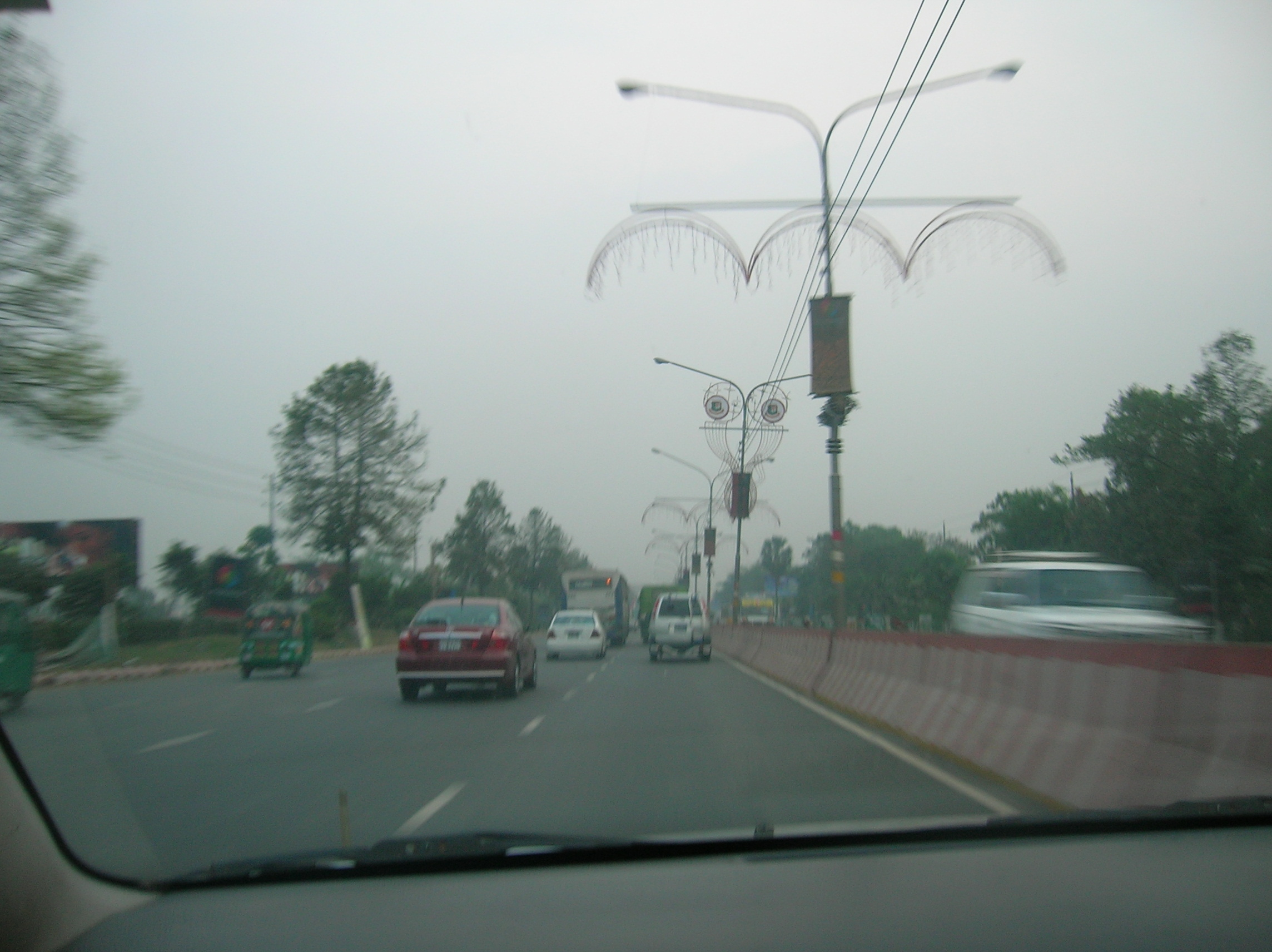
Near Army Golf Club
