= Nirjhor Residential Area =

Residential area in Dhaka Cantonment, Bangladesh

Coordinates: 23.808°N 90.393°E

Nirjhor Residential Area নির্ঝর আবাসিক এলাকা
- Residential Area
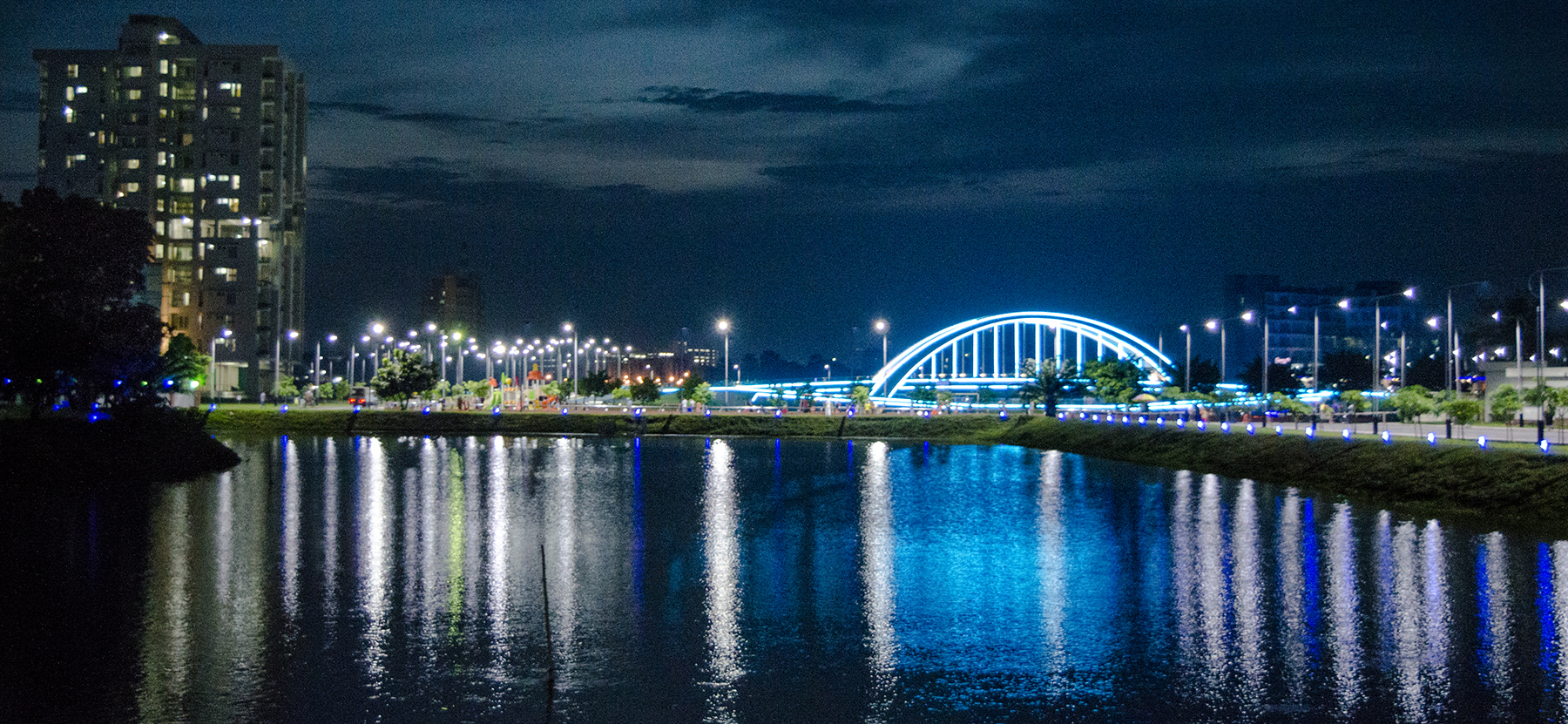
- Nirjhor
- Interactive map of Nirjhor Residential Area

Nirjhor Residential Area (Bengali: নির্ঝর আবাসিক এলাকা) is a residential area in Dhaka Cantonment, Bangladesh.

== Area ==
The area is nearby the Army Central Mosque in Dhaka Cantonment, Nirjhor contains a park, restaurant, lake, bridge and several residential buildings for members and officers of the Bangladesh Army, and a restaurant known as Tribeni and several other establishments. It borders Vashantek Thana in the north and west, Shaheed Sharani Road in the east and Dhamalkot Bazar in the south.

== History ==
In April 2015, Nirjhor Residential Area and Nisarga Residential Area were inaugurated by Sheikh Hasina.

In 2017, a tree-planting event took place in Nirjhor Residential Area with several members of the Bangladesh Army participating.

In August 2021, Dhaka Cantonment Ladies Club distributed aid among poor people and the needy, the event took place in Nirjhor Residential Area.

In 2022, another tree-planting event which was inaugurated by then Chief of Army Staff, S. M. Shafiuddin Ahmed, took place in Nirjhor Residential Area.

== Educational institutions ==
- Bangladesh International School & College (Nirjhor) (previously known as Dhaka Cantonment English School and College)
- Nirjhor Cantonment Public School and College
