= Senakunja =

Establishment in Dhaka Cantonment, Bangladesh

Coordinates: 23.8032°N 90.3999°E

Senakunja is a convention centre of Bangladesh Armed Forces and is located in Dhaka Cantonment. The venue holds official events of Bangladesh Armed Forces. as well as used for wedding ceremonies and other social gatherings.

== History ==
The Annual Armed Forces Day is held here on 21 November to commemorate the establishment of the Bangladesh military in 1971 during the Bangladesh War of Independence. The venue also holds an annual Iftar party hosted by Bangladesh Armed Forces and attended by Bangladeshi high-level officials.
