= Shaheed Bir Uttam Lt. Anwar Girls College =

Shaheed Bir Uttam Lt. Anwar Girls' School & College
- শহিদ বীর-উত্তম লে. আনোয়ার গার্লস স্কুল এন্ড কলেজ
- Seal of Shaheed Bir Uttam Lt. Anwar Girls' College

Location
- Shaheed Sharani, Dhaka Cantonment, Dhaka - 1206; Bangladesh
- Coordinates: 23°47′27.352″N 90°23′31.996″E

Information
- Type: School & College (Primary, Secondary and Higher Secondary)
- Motto: O Lord, thrive my knowledge (হে প্রতিপালক, আমার জ্ঞান বাড়িয়ে দিন)
- Established: 1 January 1957; 69 years ago
- School board: Board of Intermediate and Secondary Education, Dhaka
- Authority: Bangladesh Army
- Principal: Colonel Muhammad Sadik Mahmud, psc
- Grades: I-XII
- Years offered: 12 years
- Female
- Language: Bengali and English
- Campus size: 5.24 acres (2.12 ha)
- Campus type: Urban
- Website: sagc.edu.bd

Shaheed Bir Uttam Lt. Anwar Girls’ College (Bengali: শহিদ বীর-উত্তম লে. আনোয়ার গার্লস কলেজ) is an educational institution in Dhaka Cantonment, Dhaka, Bangladesh. It is managed by the Bangladesh Army and primarily serves the female children of army personnel. However female students from the civilian sector can also study at this college.

== History ==
In January 1957, the school was established under Dhaka Cantonment Board as a primary school for the children of defence personnel. The school was renamed to Cantonment Girls School and upgraded to a high school.

The school was renamed after Lt. Md Anwar Hossain, who was killed in action in Jessore Cantonment during the Bangladesh Liberation War and received Bir Uttam gallantry award, in 1972. It was upgraded to a college in 1990.

In April 2012, Concord Group awarded scholarships to students from the top ten schools in Dhaka including Shaheed Bir Uttam Lt. Anwar Girls School & College.

The school started taekwondo classes in 2013 in partnership with the Bangladesh Taekwondo Federation.

The school participated in the National Debate Festival '14 and the IGNITE competition organized by The Daily Star and Grameenphone.

In January 2016, after the government of Bangladesh increased the fees of some public schools in Dhaka including Shaheed Bir Uttam Lt. Anwar Girls School & College the parents protested in the street. The government subsequently stopped the fee hike.

In Higher Secondary School Certificate examination, the educational institution had a 99.86 per cent pass rate in 2017 and 99.52 per cent in 2018, one of the highest.

In 2022, Shaheed Anwar Girls College won the Inter-cantonment English Debate Competition in the college category and were runners-up in the school category.

== Alumni ==
- Nusraat Faria
- Azmeri Haque Badhon
- Nishat Majumdar
