= Army Golf Club =

Golf Club in Dhaka, Bangladesh

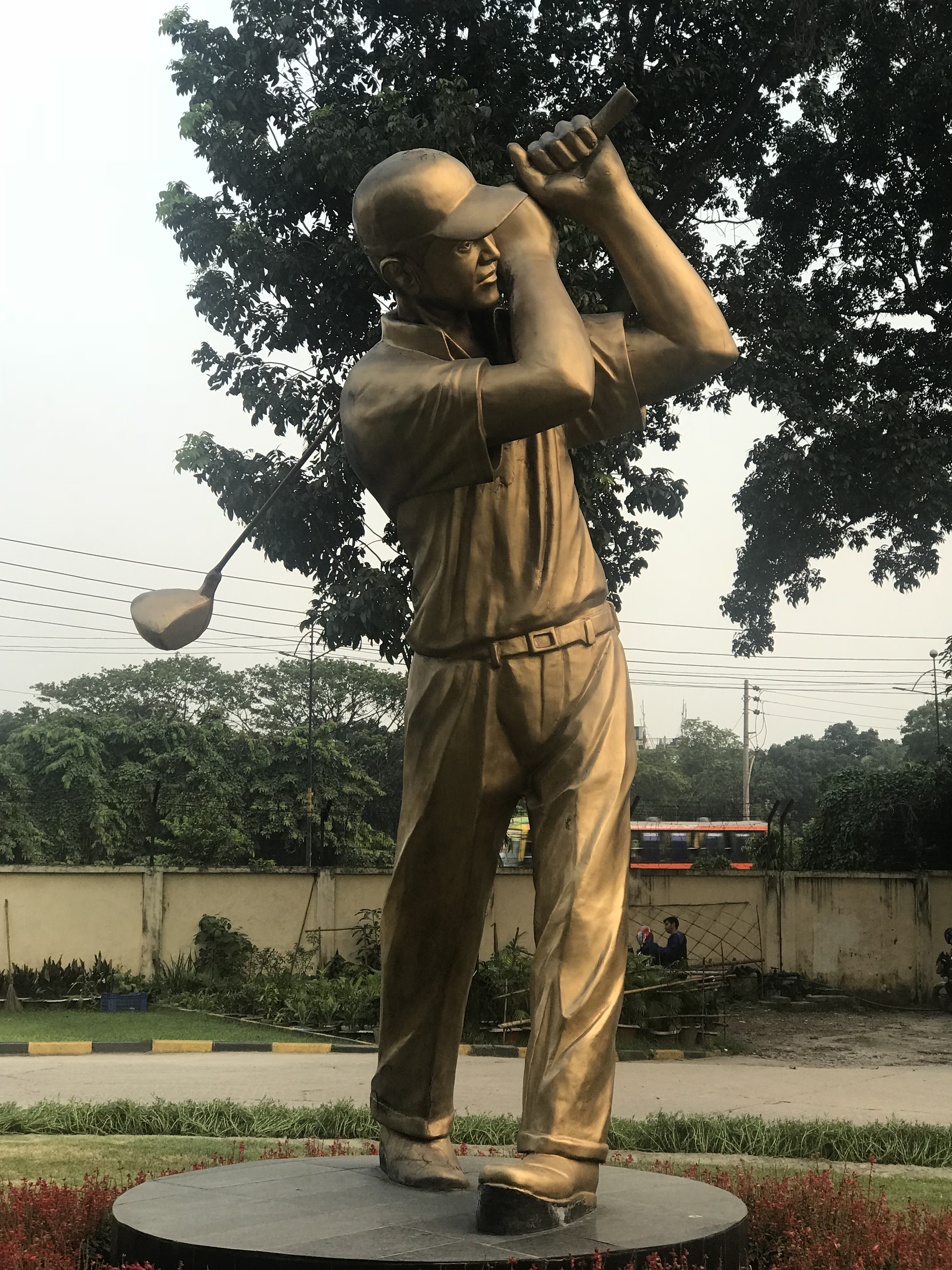
- Symbol of Army Golf Club
- Formation: 2001
- Headquarters: Dhaka, Bangladesh
- Coordinates: 23.8190°N 90.4130°E
- Region served: Bangladesh
- Official language: Bengali
- Website: agc.com.bd

Army Golf Club is a golf club in Dhaka Cantonment, Bangladesh operated by Bangladesh Army. The present president of the club Lieutenant General Khan Firoz Ahmed.

== History ==
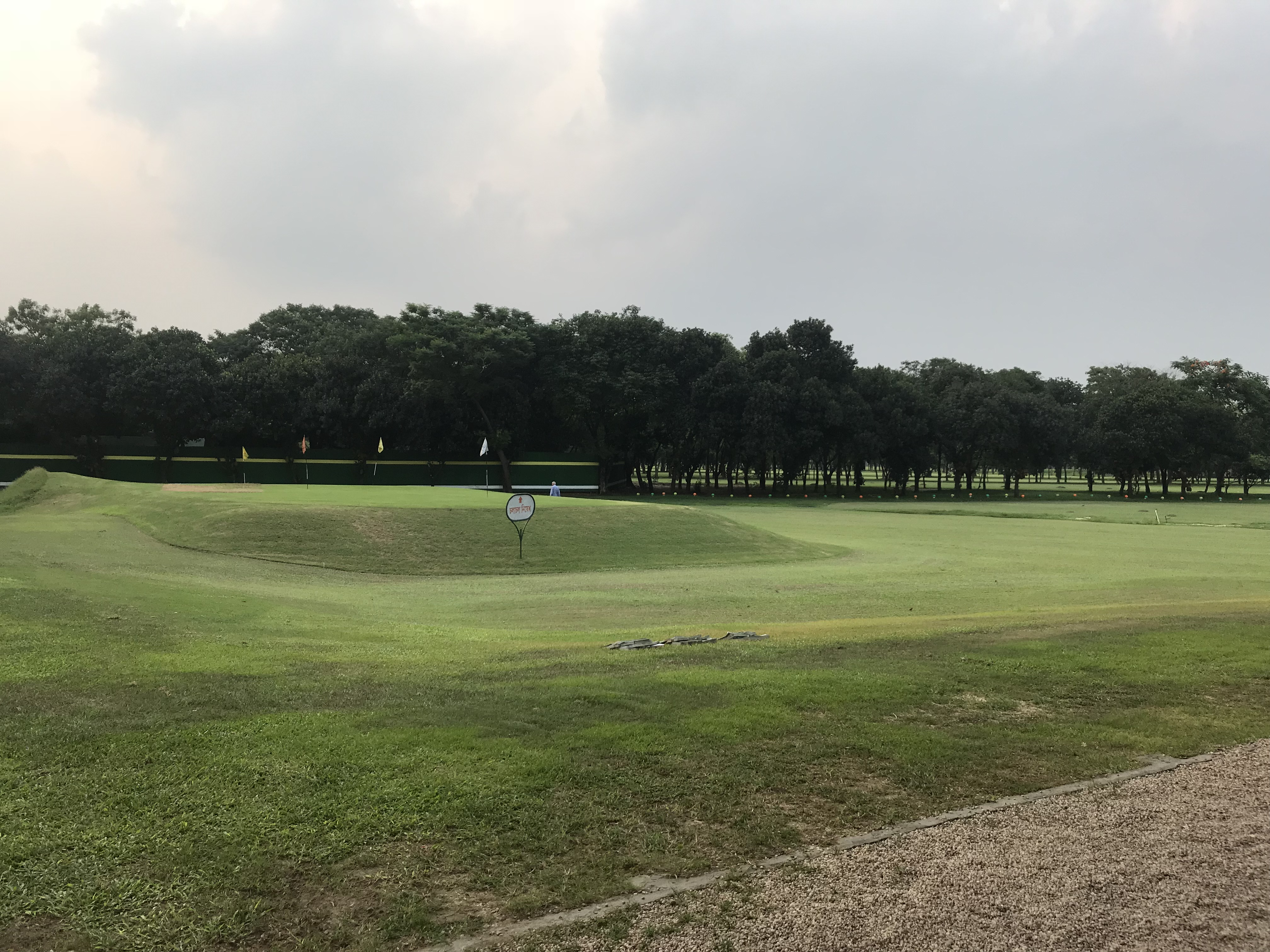

Army Golf Club was founded on 28 May 2001. It was opened by the first President of the Club and then Chief of Army Staff Lt General M Harun-Ar-Rashid. Bangladesh Golf Academy, first golf academy of Bangladesh was opened on 9 June 2010. The club is affiliated with Kurmitola Golf Club. It has a 9-hole course and over 40 acre in size. Golf garden restaurant is located in the club.
