= Mohakhali DOHS =

Neighbourhood in Dhaka

Mohakhali DOHS is a neighborhood of Dhaka for Officers of the Armed Forces. The neighborhoods belong in the Dhaka North City Corporation.

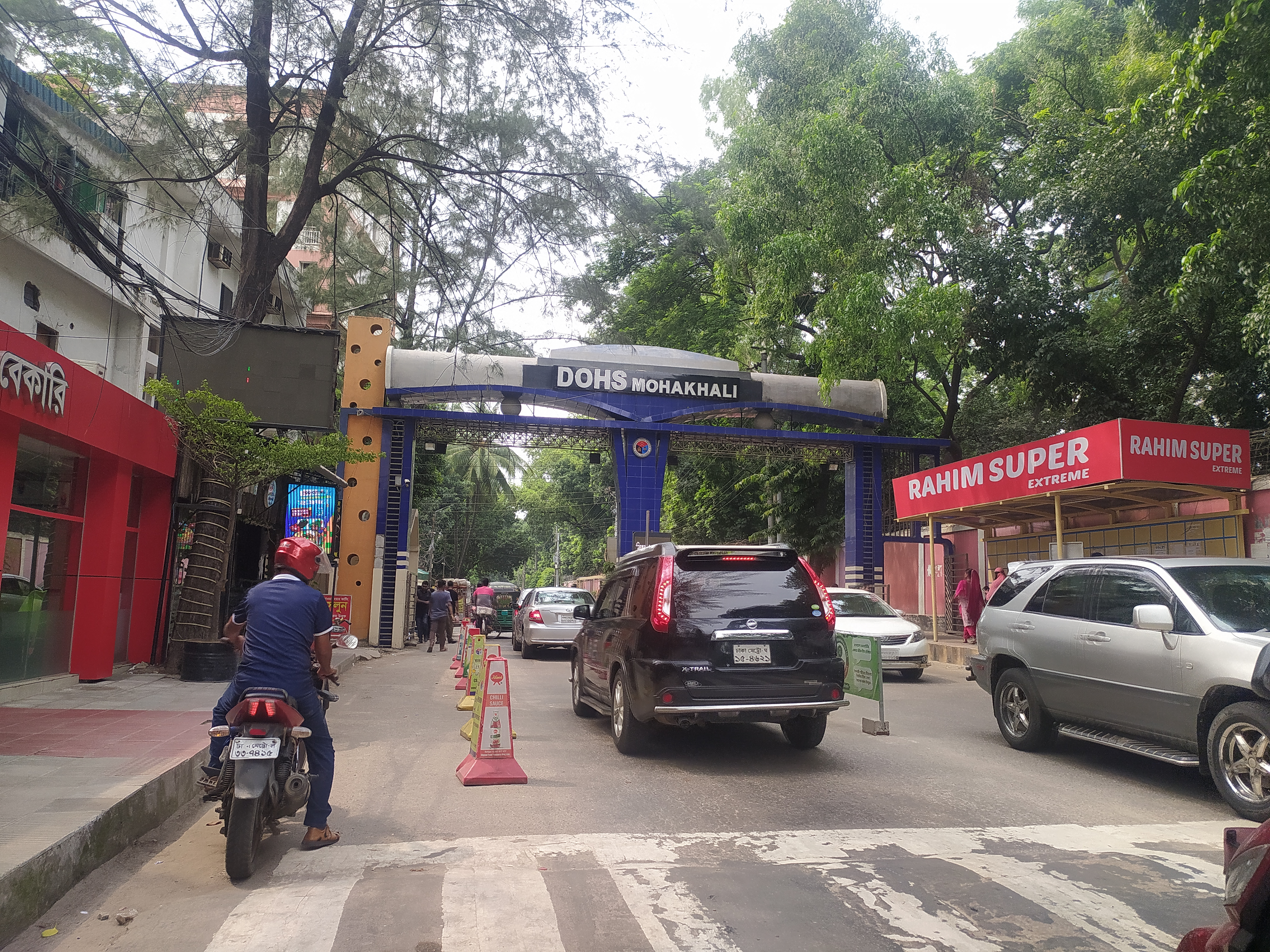
Mohakhali DOHS

== History ==
The area was established in the mid-1980s as part of the Defence Officers' Housing Scheme and has 536 individual housing plots. The administration falls under Dhaka Cantonment and the cantonment board. There is a mosque inside the DOHS.
