= Dhaka Cantonment =

Headquarters of the Bangladesh Army and Bangladesh Air force

Dhaka Cantonment
- ঢাকা সেনানিবাস
- Dhaka
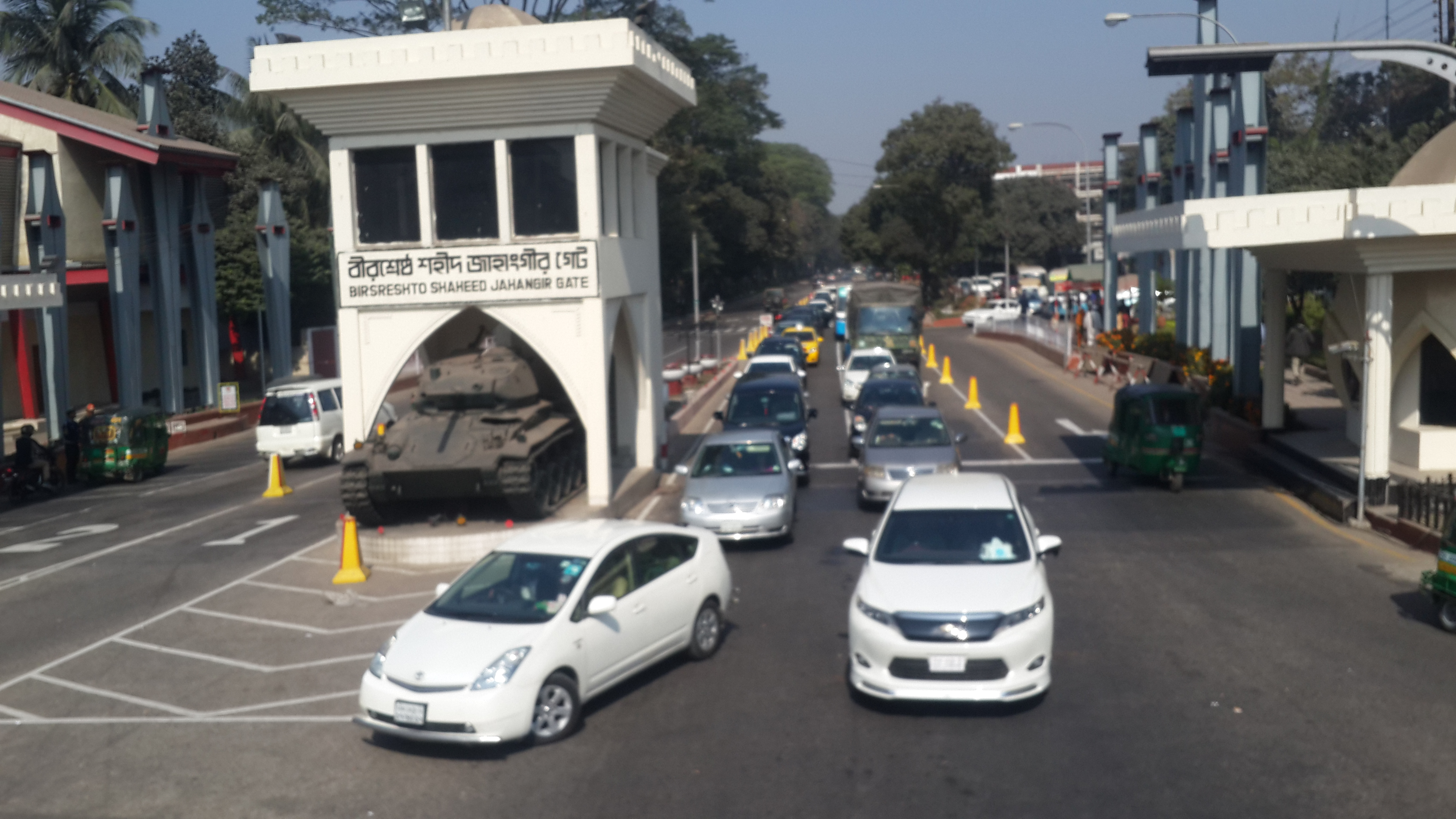
- Front View of Bir Shrestho Shaheed Jahangir Gate, Dhaka Cantonment

Site information
- Type: Cantonment
- Controlled by: Bangladesh Armed Forces

Location
- Coordinates: 23.82°N 90.40°E

Site history
- Built: 1874

Dhaka Cantonment (Bengali: ঢাকা সেনানিবাস) is a cantonment located in the northern part of Dhaka, Bangladesh. The headquarters of the Bangladesh Army and Air Force are situated within the cantonment. It is one of the oldest operating military bases in South Asia.

== History ==
=== British India ===
Due to major military engagements affecting Bengal, the then Parliament of the United Kingdom passed a bill within the Government of India Act 1858 to build new fortifications apart from Fort William across the region, the British often converted Mughal forts into military bases, such as in Lalbagh and Idrakpur. However, in 1874, small scale military installations were built in Old Dacca, Pilkhana and Tejgaon at the outcome of Second Anglo-Burmese War of 1853. The Tejgaon garrison where the modern Dhaka Cantonment stands, played a pivotal role of logistics during Third Anglo-Burmese War of 1885 and, again in Burma campaign in Second World War where it served as the initial headquarters of fourteenth army before shifting to Cumilla Cantonment. The British Army rechristened the area as Dacca cantonment and built an airbase and an army station at Tejgaon as part of the South-East Asian campaign of Second World War. This installation primarily served British forces and conducted redoubt operations against Imperial Japanese Army who were invading from Burma. At that time, Dacca cantonment was installed with mostly units of Royal Indian Air Force and few components of 2nd Infantry Division (headquartered then at Chittagong) in 1944 reflecting its early and limited development.

=== Pakistan ===
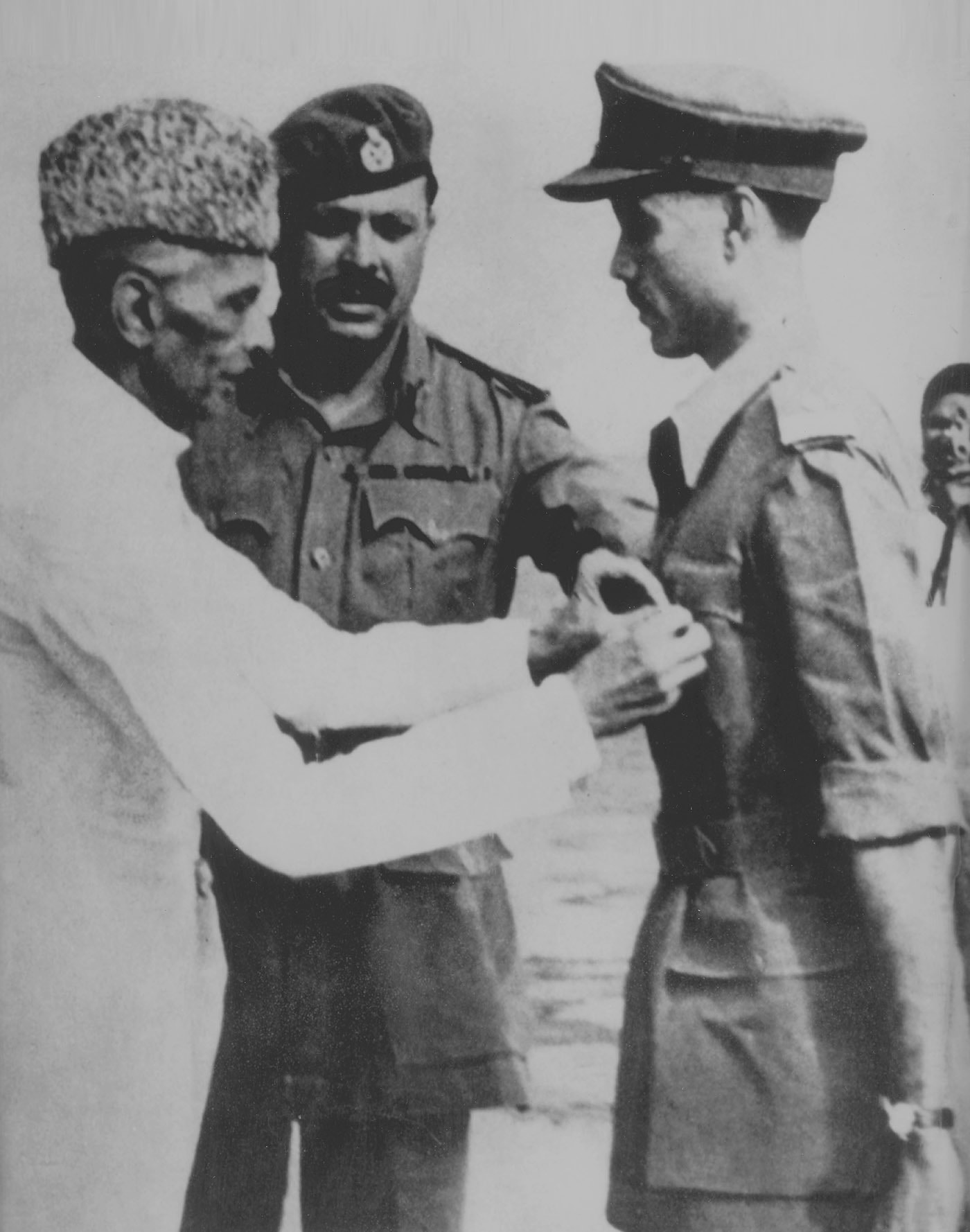
Brigadier Ayub Khan with Muhammad Ali Jinnah (left) who is conferring the Military Cross on a Burma campaign veteran at Dacca Cantonment, 20 March 1948

On 14 August 1947, the cantonment became an installation of the Pakistan Armed Forces, and in 1952, it was fully ameliorated, with the headquarters of 14th Infantry Division of Pakistan Army stationed here as the sole army division of East Pakistan. On 23 August 1969, the Pakistan Eastern Command's headquarters here was inaugurated with Lt. Gen. Sahabzada Yaqub Khan being appointed as its first commander. Dhaka Cantonment also became one of the major scheming place for Operation Searchlight under Lt. Gen. Tikka Khan with major political leaders of Awami league and intellectuals detained as well as tormented in the cantonment. The Pakistan Army eventually withdrew from its installation on 16 December 1971, according to their instrument of surrender, after the outcome of Bangladesh Liberation War.

=== Bangladesh ===
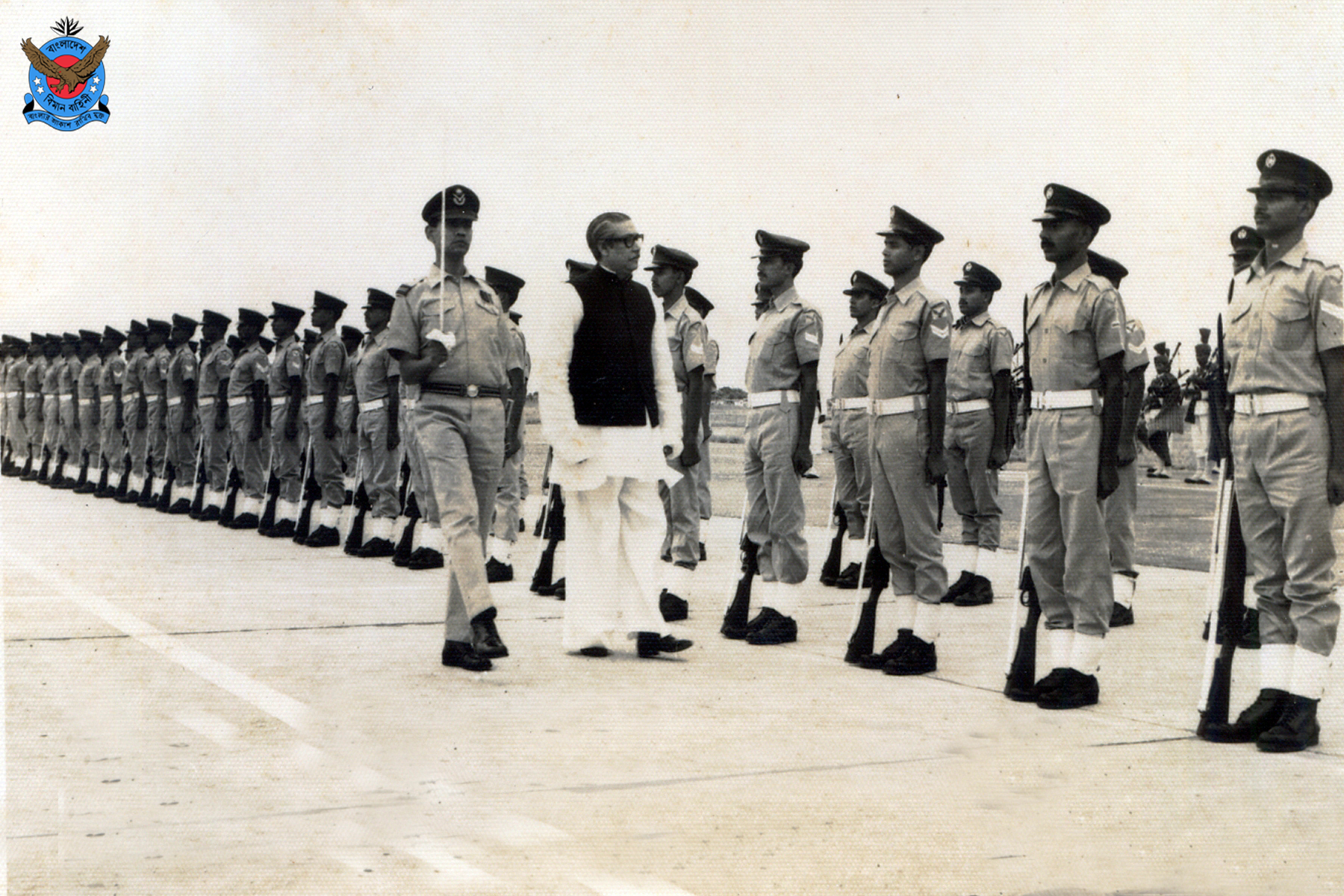
Sheikh Mujibur Rahman with Airforce personnel at the cantonment parade ground

After the independence of Bangladesh, the newly formed Bangladesh Army shifted their headquarters from Sreemangal to Dhaka Cantonment on 20 December 1971. Under Chief of Staff Maj. Gen. M. A Rab, the cantonment was restructured with new infantry brigade, engineers brigade, signals brigade and a para commando regiment were inaugurated. Dhaka Cantonment initially headquartered the 9th Infantry Division, before being moved to Savar on 31 May 1984. The cantonment once again became one of the main scheming hotspot during 2006–2008 Bangladeshi political crisis under Gen. Moeen U Ahmed and acting prime minister Fakhruddin Ahmed. Former prime minister Khaleda Zia's family had been living for 38 years in the 2.72-acre plot house at 6 Shaheed Mainul Road house in Dhaka Cantonment. It was the official residence of her husband, former president Ziaur Rahman, when he was appointed as the Deputy Chief of Staff (DCS) of the Bangladesh Army. After he became the President of Bangladesh, he kept the house as his residence. Following his assassination in 1981, the acting President Abdus Sattar, leased the house "for life" to Zia, for a nominal ৳101. When the army again took over in 1982, former president Hussain Muhammad Ershad confirmed this arrangement.

On 20 April 2009, the Directorate of Military Lands and Cantonments handed a notice asking Zia to vacate the cantonment residence. Several allegations and irregularities mentioned in the notice - first, Zia had been carrying out political activities from the house – which went against a condition of the allotment; second, one cannot get an allotment of two government houses in the capital; third, a civilian cannot get a resident lease within a cantonment. Zia vacated the house on 13 November 2010. She then moved to the residence of her brother, Sayeed Iskandar, at Gulshan.

== Command installations ==
- Armed Forces Division (AFD)
- Army Headquarters (AHQ)
- Air Headquarters (Air HQ)
- DGFI Headquarters (DGFI HQ)
- Inter Services Selection Board (ISSB)
- Department of Military Lands & Cantonments
  - Dhaka Cantonment Board

== Formations under Army Headquarters ==
Administrations and Limited Companies

- Bangladesh Army Welfare Trust
- Inter Services Public Relations Directorate (ISPR)
- Directorate General of Medical Service (DGMS)
- Armed Forces Institute of Pathology
- Bangladesh Diesel Plant
- Army Families Welfare Society

Areas under the Defense Officers Housing Schemes (DOHS) also fall under Dhaka Cantonment.

Command structure

- Headquarters Logistics Area
  - Station Headquarters, Dhaka
    - Station ST Battalion
    - Army Internet, Telecommunications and Static Office (AITSO)
    - Station Recruiting Unit
  - 24th Engineers Construction Brigade
    - 14th Engineers Construction Battalion
    - 17th Engineers Construction Battalion
    - 25th Engineers Construction Battalion
  - Central Ordnance Depot
  - Central Mechanical Transport Depot
  - Combined Military Hospital
  - 901st Central EME Workshop
  - 13th Military Police Unit
- 14th Independent Engineers Brigade
  - 12th Engineers Regiment
  - 57th Engineers Regiment
- 86th Independent Signals Brigade
  - 10th Signals Battalion
  - 11th Signals Battalion
  - Army Signals Base Workshop
  - Army Static Signal Battalion
- 46th Independent Infantry Brigade
  - 25th East Bengal Regiment
  - 4th Bangladesh Infantry Regiment
  - 57th East Bengal Regiment
  - 45th Engineers Company
  - 16th Signals Brigade Company
  - 109th Field Ambulance Company
- President Guard Brigade
  - 12th President Guard Regiment
  - 16th President Guard Regiment
- Army Aviation Group
  - 6 Army Aviation Squadron
  - Ad hoc Army Aviation Group
- Army Security Unit

== Formations under Air Headquarters ==
Command structure

- BAF Base Bashar
- BAF Base Khandker

== Formations under Bangladesh Navy ==
Command structure

- Dhaka Naval Area (COMDHAKA)
  - BNS Haji Mohshin
  - BNS Dhaka

== Formations under Bangladesh Railway ==
- Dhaka Cantonment Railway Station

== Establishments ==
- Kurmitola General Hospital
- Siraj Khaleda Hospital
- Sainik Club
- Senakunjo
- Army Golf Club
- Kurmitola Golf Club
- Bangladesh Army Stadium
- BMTF Corporate Office

=== Education ===
- Adamjee Cantonment College
- BAF Shaheen College Dhaka
- BAF Shaheen College Kurmitola
- BAF Shaheen English Medium College
- Noubahini College, Dhaka
- Shaheed Bir Uttam Lt. Anwar Girls' College
- Shaheed Ramiz Uddin Cantonment College
- Adamjee Cantonment Public School
- Muslim Modern Academy
- Dhaka Cantonment Girls Public School and College
- Shaheed Ramiz Uddin Cantonment College
- Dhaka Cantonment Board Adarsha Bidyaniketon
- Nirjhor Cantonment Public School and College
- Bangladesh International School & College (Nirjhor), Nirjhor Residential Area
- Bangladesh International School & College, Mohakhali DOHS
- PROYASH - Institute of Special Education
- BAF Blue Sky School
- BAFWWA Golden Eagle Nursery School
- Prottoy Inclusive English Medium School
