= Jahangir Alam (general) =

Director General of Forces Intelligence

Mohammad Jahangir Alam BSP ndc psc

Director General of Directorate General of Forces Intelligence
- In office 14 October 2024 – 22 February 2026
- President: Mohammed Shahabuddin
- Prime Minister: Muhammad Yunus
- Preceded by: Muhammad Faizur Rahman
- Succeeded by: Mohammad Kaiser Rashid Chowdhury

Personal details
- Education: Defence Services Command and Staff College Military Training Bangladesh Military Academy
- Awards: Bishishto Seba Padak (BSP)

Military service
- Allegiance: Bangladesh
- Branch/service: Bangladesh Army
- Years of service: 1992–present
- Rank: Major General
- Unit: East Bengal Regiment
- Commands: Director General of Directorate General of Forces Intelligence; GOC of 33rd Infantry Division; Commander of 44th Infantry Brigade; Commander of 203rd Infantry Brigade
- Battles/wars: UNMISS

Mohammad Jahangir Alam is a major general of the Bangladesh Army. Currently posted in the Ministry of Foreign Affairs as an ambassador. Before that, he served as the director general (DG) of the Directorate General of Forces Intelligence (DGFI). Before that, he was the general officer commanding (GOC) of the 33 Infantry Division and the area commander of Comilla Area.

== Education ==
Jahangir Alam graduated from the Defence Services Command and Staff College (DSCSC) in Mirpur. He also participated in various professional training programs, including foreign courses in New Zealand and Uganda.

== Career ==
Jahangir was commissioned into the Bangladesh Army on 9 June 1992, through the 26th Bangladesh Military Academy (BMA) Long Course. His parent unit is the 11th East Bengal Regiment. He commanded the 14th Bangladesh Infantry Regiment (BIR) as lieutenant colonel and the 44th and 203rd Infantry Brigades as brigadier general.

He also served as sector commander in the United Nations peacekeeping operation in South Sudan. Additionally, he served as a liaison officer in the Kuwait Armed Forces with the Infantry Security Battalion. On 14 October 2024, Major General Jahangir was appointed as the director general of the DGFI, taking over from his predecessor, Major General Faizur Rahman.

He was awarded the "Bishishto Seba Padak" (Distinguished Service Medal) for his outstanding and exemplary performance during the Rana Plaza disaster. Additionally, the general received the "Force Commander's Commendation" for his exemplary performance in peacekeeping missions and a "Certificate of Appreciation" for excellence as a commanding officer from the CAS of the Bangladesh Army.
