= Golam Mohammad =

Major General of the Bangladesh Army

- Military career
- Allegiance: Bangladesh
- Branch: Bangladesh Army
- Service years: 1979–2010
- Rank: Major General
- Unit: East Bengal Regiment
- Commands: GOC of 33rd Infantry Division; Director General of Directorate General of Forces Intelligence; Director General of Bangladesh Institute of International and Strategic Studies; Commander of 88th Infantry Brigade
- Conflicts: UNTAG; 2006-2008 Bangladeshi political crisis

Golam Mohammad is a major general of the Bangladesh Army and former director general of the Directorate General of Forces Intelligence. He is a former director general of the Bangladesh Institute of International and Strategic Studies.

== Early life and education ==
Mohammad graduated from Mirzapur Cadet College. He completed his master's in defence strategic studies from the University of Madras. He studied at the National Defense University and completed a second master's in national security strategy.

== Career ==
Mohammad was commissioned in the infantry corps of the East Bengal Regiment on 14 June 1979.

From 1989 to 1990, Mohammad served in Namibia as part of the United Nations Transition Assistance Group.

Mohammad was the directing staff of the Defence Services Command and Staff College.

In 2007, Mohammad was promoted from deputy director general of the Directorate General of Forces Intelligence to director general of the Directorate General of Forces Intelligence in June 2007 and promoted to major general. During the 2006–2008 Bangladeshi political crisis, the Bangladesh Military ruled the country through the un-elected Fakhruddin Ahmed caretaker government, which made the Directorate General of Forces Intelligence very influential. The United States ambassador to Bangladesh, James F. Moriarty, warned Mohammad that his country was strongly opposed to the creation of the Directorate General of Forces Intelligence-backed Islamic Democratic Party, made out of former members of the terrorist organization Harkat-ul-Jihad-al-Islami Bangladesh, on 12 November 2008. He also expressed surprise that Sheikh Hasina was pressured by Brigadier General A. T. M. Amin to lobby the United States to accept the Islamic Democratic Party. Brigadier General Emadul Haque, director general of the Counter Terrorism and Intelligence Bureau, was also present at the meeting between Mohammad and the ambassador. Mohammad apologized to the ambassador and assured him that the Islamic Democratic Party will not be allowed to register. He was a close friend of H.T. Imam, advisor to Prime Minister and Awami League chairperson Sheikh Hasina. His friendship provided a link between the caretaker government and the Awami League.

In 2009, Mohammad edited the book, National Security Bangladesh 2009, published by The University Press Limited. During the caretaker government rule, both Mohammad and Army Chief Moeen U Ahmed took stances on political issues publicly. They were able to increase the defence budget to 64 billion taka in the 2008-2009 budget, which was an increase of 10 billion taka and the biggest defence budget in the history of Bangladesh. In February 2009, Mohammad was transferred from director general of the Directorate General of Forces Intelligence to general officer commanding of the 33rd Infantry Division based in Comilla Cantonment. Major General Mollah Fazle Akbar replaced him as director general of the Directorate General of Forces Intelligence.
