= Mohammad Akbar Hossain =

Bangladeshi Army general

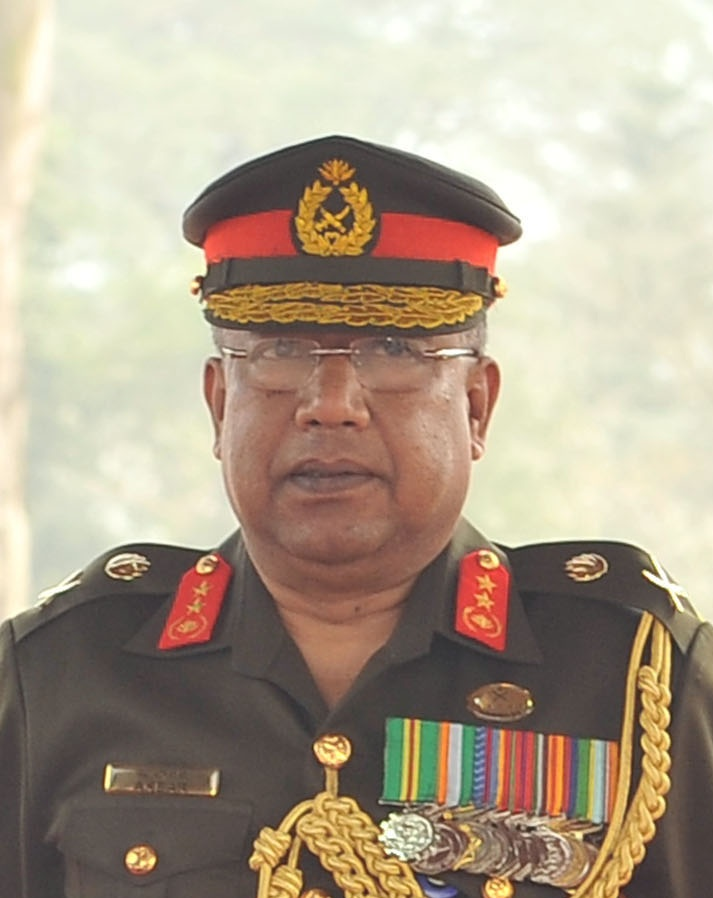
- Akbar in 2018
- Born: 9 August 1965 (age 61); Raozan, East Pakistan, Pakistan
- Military career
- Allegiance: Bangladesh
- Branch: Bangladesh Army
- Service years: 1985 – 2023
- Rank: Lieutenant General
- Unit: Regiment of Artillery
- Commands: Commandant of National Defence College; Commandant of Defence Services Command and Staff College; GOC of 9th Infantry Division; Director General of Directorate General of Forces Intelligence; Commander of 6th Independent Air Defence Artillery Brigade; Director of CTIB; Commander of 24th Artillery Brigade
- Awards: Senabahini Padak (SBP); Bishishto Seba Padak (BSP); Sena Utkorsho Padak(SUP)
- Police career
- Unit: Rapid Action Battalion
- Allegiance: Bangladesh
- Branch: Bangladesh Police
- Service years: 2004–2007
- Rank: Director

Mohammad Akbar Hossain (Note: SBP, BSP, SUP, afwc, psc, G+, Phd) is a retired three-star general of the Bangladesh Army. He is a former commandant of National Defence College and antecedent director general of Forces Intelligence.

== Early life and education ==
Akbar was born in 1965 at Raozan Upazila of then East Pakistan, Pakistan (now in Chittagong Division, Bangladesh). He enlisted to Bangladesh Military Academy on 1983 and was commissioned with the 13th BMA long course in the corps of artillery on 1985. Akbar is a graduate of the Defence Services Command and Staff College and the Armed Forces War College. Akbar furthermore obtained his gunnery staff course on air defence from the School of Army Air Defence at Malir Cantonment in Pakistan.

== Military career ==
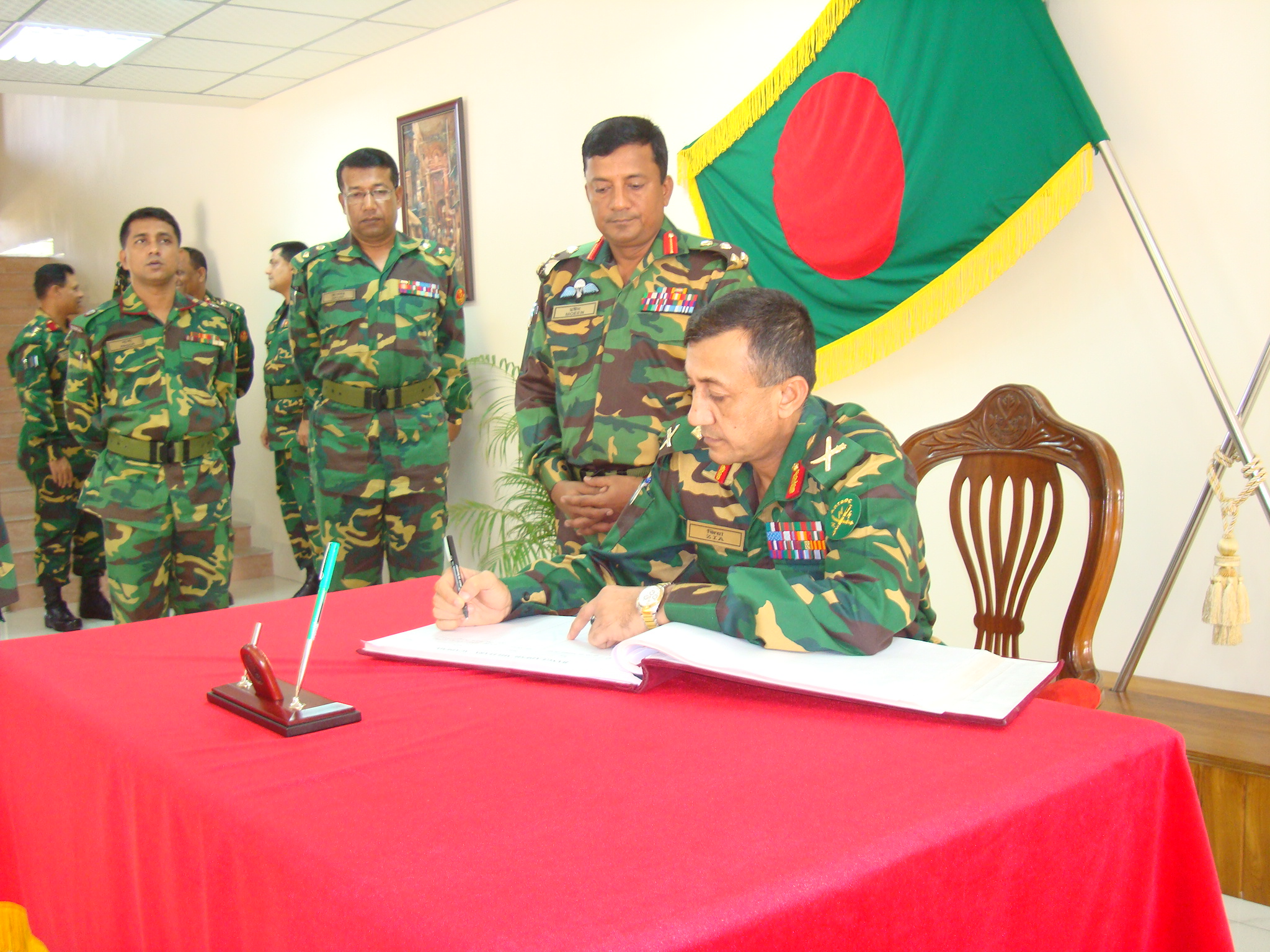
Akbar (centre left) with then general officer commanding of ARTDOC Major General Zia-Ur-Rahman on 2008.

Akbar commanded an artillery battery and an air defence regiment in Rajendrapur Cantonment. Akbar also served in 2nd Rapid Action Battalion as commanding officer in October 2005. He moreover instructed at Artillery Centre and School in Halishahar Cantonment and the Bangladesh Military Academy. Akbar furthermore served as colonel general staff at the Directorate General of Forces Intelligence in 2009.

Akbar was promoted brigadier general around 2010 and commanded one artillery brigade in Chittagong Hill Tracts and one air defence brigade at Mirpur Cantonment. Akbar shortly returned to Directorate General of Forces Intelligence for leading the Counter Terrorism and Intelligence Bureau. Akbar was ameliorated to major general in 2013 and appointed as Director General of Forces Intelligence. In 2017 he was designated as general officer commanding of the 9th Infantry Division and area commander Savar area. Akbar then tenured as commandant of Defence Services Command and Staff College. He became the 1st Colonel Commandant of the Remount Veterinary and Farm Corps in December 2020. He was upgraded to lieutenant general in January 2021 and served as the commandant of the National Defence College. Akbar went to leave per retirement in November 2023. (Note: Multiple reference:)

== Controversies ==
As of March 2025, Akbar has been implicated in several allegations. In September 2024, a complaint was filed against him with the International Crimes Tribunal of Bangladesh, accusing him of involvement in enforced disappearances and extrajudicial killings at his tenure as Director General of Forces Intelligence during third Hasina ministry.

The complaint, submitted by a retired major alias as M Sarwar Hassan and a supreme court lawyer alleges that Akbar detained numerous individuals in secret prisons and supported manipulated elections in 2014 and 2018. These actions are claimed to have undermined democratic processes in Bangladesh.
