= Molla Fazle Akbar =

Bangladesh Army officer

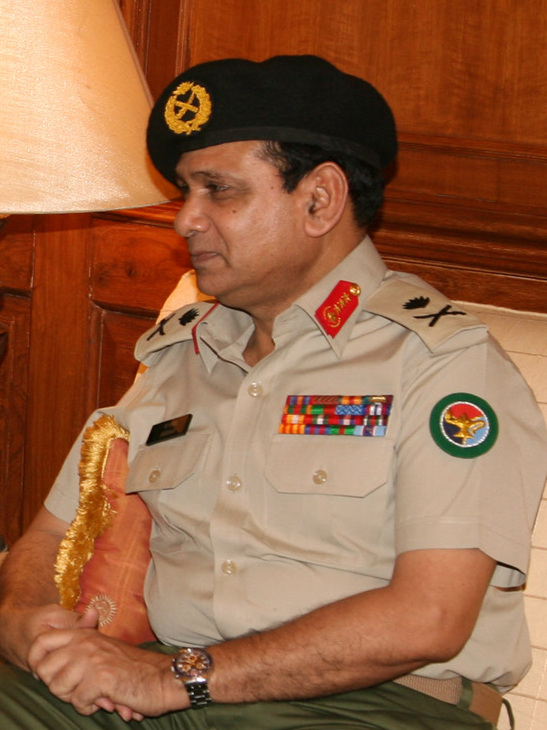
- Fazle Akbar in 2011
- Born: 29 February 1952 (age 74); Chittagong, East Bengal, Pakistan
- Military career
- Allegiance: Bangladesh
- Branch: Bangladesh Army; Bangladesh Rifles
- Service years: 1976 – 2016
- Rank: Lieutenant General
- Unit: Regiment of Artillery
- Commands: Commandant of National Defence College; Director General of Directorate General of Forces Intelligence; Commander of 6th Independent Air Defence Artillery Brigade; Commander of 55th Artillery Brigade; Sector Commander of Bangladesh Rifles
- Conflicts: UNMIL; Bangladesh Liberation War
- Awards: Bishishto Seba Padak (BSP)

Molla Fazle Akbar is a retired three-star rank Bangladesh Army officer and the former director general of the Directorate General of Forces Intelligence. After retirement, he served as an advisor to Regent Airways, and the chairman of the board of directors of a financial institute, Bangladesh Industrial Finance Company Limited (BIFC), as well as vice chairman of the board of directors of a commercial bank, Union Bank Limited.

== Career ==
=== Military ===
He was made the director general of the Directorate General of Forces Intelligence on 5 February 2009. In 2010, he was promoted to lieutenant general, making him one of the four officers of that rank in Bangladesh Army at that time.

In his last assignment, he served as the commandant of National Defence College (NDC). Lieutenant General Fazle Akbar retired on 16 February 2016.

=== Post-military ===
After his retirement, he joined as an adviser to Regent Airways, which ceased operations in 2022. In March 2024, as its CEO, he announced the launch of a new airline called Fly Dhaka, which was supposed to start operation in December 2024.

Before the 2018 general election in Bangladesh, he pledged his support, along with many other officers, for the Bangladesh Awami League.

== Controversies ==
In November 2024, the interim government of Bangladesh, led by Chief Adviser Muhammad Yunus, reportedly canceled the passports of 22 former military and security officials. This action was based on allegations of involvement in enforced disappearances and extrajudicial killings during the tenure of Prime Minister Sheikh Hasina. Lieutenant General Molla Fazle Akbar, who served as the director general of the Directorate General of Forces Intelligence (DGFI) from 2009 to 2011, was among the officials whose passports were revoked.
