= Aminul Karim =

Retired Lieutenant General of Bangladesh Army

- আমিনুল করিম
- Portrait of Lt. General Aminul Karim
- Born: Mohammed Aminul Karim; 1 July 1955 (age 71); Shibganj, East Bengal, Pakistan
- Education: University of Dhaka; Harvard Kennedy School; National Defence College; College of Defence Management; Rajshahi Cadet College
- Military career
- Allegiance: Bangladesh
- Branch: Bangladesh Army
- Service years: 1975–2009
- Rank: Lieutenant General
- Nickname: Rumi
- Unit: Regiment of Artillery
- Commands: Commandant of National Defence College; QMG of Army Headquarters; Military Secretary to President; GOC of 9th Infantry Division; AG of Army Headquarters; Commandant of Defense Services Command and Staff College; Commander of 6th Independent Air Defence Artillery Brigade; Commander of 24th Artillery Brigade
- Conflicts: Chittagong Hill Tracts Conflict

Aminul Karim (Note: ndc, idmc, psc) (born 1 July 1955) is a retired three-star general of the Bangladesh Army. He served as the Military Secretary (MSP) to the President of Bangladesh, Iajuddin Ahmed. He was a senior research fellow at the Asia Europe Institute, University of Malaya.

== Early life and education ==
Aminul Karim was born on 1 July 1955 at the village Ranibari in Shibganj upazila of Chapai Nawabganj. He passed SSC in 1972 and HSC in 1974 from Rajshahi Cadet College with distinction. He graduated from University of Dhaka in 1980.

He completed his staff course in 1985 from the Armed Forces Staff College in Kuala Lumpur. He completed the long defence management course (Master's in Management Studies) in 1992 from the College of Defence Management affiliated to Osmania University in Secunderabad, India. In 1994, he obtained his postgraduate (MSS—political science) degree from the Faculty of Social Sciences, University of Dhaka with distinction. He graduated from the National University in 1995 with a master's degree in defence studies. He completed the Executive Program (Conflict Management) course in 2000 from the Harvard Kennedy School.

In 2001, he completed the national defence course (M Phil) from the National Defence College. He completed a senior executive program course in 2003 from the Near East South Asia Center for Strategic Studies from the National Defense University, Washington, D.C.. He was awarded PhD degree by University of Dhaka in 2007 for his dissertation on Chinese modernization.

== Career ==
Aminul Karim was commissioned in Bangladesh Army as an officer in 1975 in the Regiment of Artillery. He commanded two field units and two field brigades including one independent brigade. He commanded a unit in the Chittagong Hill Tracts in counterinsurgency role. He worked as a brigade major in an independent brigade and a staff officer in the military operations directorate at Army Headquarters. He also worked at the Military Secretary's Branch at Army Headquarters. Aminul was a faculty member of Defence Services Command and Staff College from 1992 to 1995. From 2001 to 2002, he served as a faculty member at the National Defence College, training senior military and civilian officials in defence and senior management of national security.

From 2002 to 2003, he served as the Quartermaster General of the Bangladesh Army. He served as the Adjutant General of the Bangladesh Army in 2004. From 2004 to 2005 he served as the General Officer Commanding of an Army Division of the Bangladesh Army. He served as Commandant of the Defence Services Command and Staff College from 2005 to 2006. From 2006 to 2008, he served as the Military Secretary to the President of Bangladesh, (with the rank of Secretary to the Government of Bangladesh). From 2003 to 2004 as Major General of the Bangladesh Army and from 2008 to 2009 as Lieutenant General worked as Commandant of the National Defence College affiliated with the Bangladesh University of Professionals.

=== During 1/11 ===
In an interview, Karim stated that he was against military intervention and he had warned the President not to rely on the military. Recollecting his memories, he stated that he had told President Iajuddin Ahmed that the army was like a tiger and that he should not 'ride on the back of a tiger.' He has denied inviting the three service chiefs into Bangabhaban and has stated that the President himself invited them in. According to him, President Iajuddin had regularly been in contact with the service chiefs and published photos with them to give the illusion of the military backing him. But this backfired massively as General Moeen U Ahmed seized control. Regarding the transfer of power, he stated:

"The main architect of One-Eleven was Army Chief Moeen U Ahmed. He wanted to impose martial law. However, the U.S. Embassy in Dhaka intervened, meeting with Major General Jahangir Alam Chowdhury, the then-PSO of the Armed Forces Division, and discouraged him from doing so. Lieutenant General Masud Ahmed informed me about this. Jahangir Alam Chowdhury and Moeen U Ahmed were coursemates and shared a close relationship. On January 11, 2007, at approximately 1:30 pm, Moeen U Ahmed, the three service chiefs, PSO Major General Jahangir Alam Chowdhury, and acting DG of DGFI Brigadier General Fazlul Bari went to Bangabhaban. At that time, Moeen U Ahmed showed the President a letter from the United Nations, although that letter was later proven to be fake. After about two hours, they left with President Iajuddin Ahmed's signature."

Furthermore, he stated that he had been offered an ambassadorship, which he declined as he wanted to stay close to his sick mother. He was later sent on forced retirement from Bangladesh Army on March 12, 2009.

== Academic career ==
He was a visiting professor at the University of Malaya from 2009 to 2016 and China Foreign Affairs University from July 2016 to September 2016. He was professor and Dean of School of Business, Independent University, Bangladesh from 2017 to 2022. Presently, he is a Distinguished Professor in the Department of International Relations at the Bangladesh University of Professionals (BUP), Dhaka.

General Aminul Karim is a member of the Retired Armed Forces Officers' Welfare Association, the Dhaka Club Limited, the Rotary Club of Dhaka Central, We Speak Chinese Club Bangladesh Limited, Ziauddin Mondol Foundation, Alokito Chapai Nawabganj etc.

== Books ==
Notable books published by Aminul include:

- Contemporary Security Issues in the Asia-Pacific and Bangladesh. Academic Press and Publishers Library. 2006. ISBN 984-08-0213-5.
- Selected Papers on Security and Leadership
- Power Politics in the Asia-Pacific : The Case of Chinese Modernization
- 21st Century High Politics in the Indo-Pacific and the Bay of Bengal (Countries and Cultures of the World)
- Geopolitics of the South China Sea in the Coming Decades
- Chinese Military Modernization - Implications for the Region, Monograph Published by Bangladesh Institute of Law and International Affair
- Genocide and Geopolitics of the Rohingya Crisis
- Is China Encircling India?
- What to know about Supply Chain Management
- The Bay of Bengal Geopolitics and the QUAD.
- "Ethnicity and Geopolitics of Rohingya Crisis", in Risks, Identity and Conflict, Theoretical Perspectives and Case Studies
- “Political Culture and Institution-building Impacting Civil-Military Relations (CMR) in Bangladesh”, a chapter published in a book titled Guns & Roses: Comparative Civil-Military Relations in the Changing Security Environment.
- “The Power Political Balancing: The Case of Chinese Military Modernization” a book chapter under publication by Chinese Academy of Social Sciences
- ‘Impact of Microcredit on Socioeconomic Empowerment of Farmers and Agricultural Output in Bangladesh”, Project underway as a book chapter by Springer/ Nature

His journal publications appear in Springer, Nature, Wiley, Cambridge, Routledge, Taylor and Francis, Palgrave McMillan etc.
