= Director General of Forces Intelligence =

Section of the Bangladesh Armed Forces

- প্রতিরক্ষা গোয়েন্দা মহাপরিচালক
- Insignia of DGFI

- Flag of DGFI

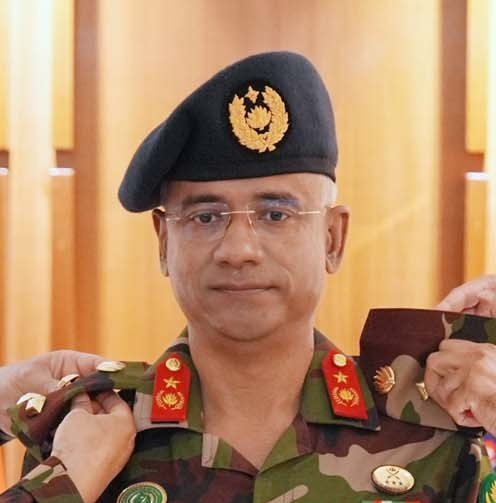
- Incumbent; Major General Mohammad Kaiser Rashid Chowdhury since 22 February 2026
- Directorate General of Forces Intelligence
- Abbreviation: DG
- Member of: National Committee on Security Affairs; National Cyber Security Council; National Committee for Intelligence Coordination
- Reports to: President; Prime Minister
- Residence: Dhaka Cantonment
- Seat: DGFI Building, Shadhinota Sarani Rd, Dhaka, Bangladesh
- Appointer: Prime Minister of Bangladesh
- Term length: At the pleasure of the president
- Formation: 1979; 47 years ago
- First holder: BG Abdur Rauf
- Salary: ৳112080 (US$910) per month (incl. allowances)

The Director General of Forces Intelligence is the head of the Directorate General of Forces Intelligence, the principal intelligence agency of the Bangladesh Armed Forces. The position is generally held by a senior military officer, usually a major general.

== History ==
In 1977, the Directorate General of Forces Intelligence underwent significant reorganization, transitioning from the Minister of Defense to the Director of Martial Law Control Communication and Control Center under Wing Commander Muhammad Hamidullah Khan. As part of this transformation, the agency's headquarters was relocated to Dhaka Cantonment, establishing it as the principal intelligence arm of the defense forces.

Officially adopting its current name in 1977, the DGFI predominantly comprises military officers from all three branches of the Bangladesh Armed Forces, while also employing a select number of civilian staff. The agency's primary mission is to provide timely and accurate intelligence and tactical support to the Armed Forces commands. Although the DGFI's budget remains classified, it is reported to have the largest financial allocation among intelligence agencies in the country, underscoring its critical role in national security and defense.

== List of director generals ==
#	Rank	Name	Start of term	End of term
Director
1	Brigadier General	Abdur Rauf	1972	1975
2	Colonel	Jamil Uddin Ahmad	1975	1975
3	Air Vice Marshal	Aminul Islam Khan	1975	1977
Director-Martial Law Communication and Control Center
4	Wing Commander	Muhammad Hamidullah Khan	1977	1978
List of Director General (DG) of Directorate General of Forces Intelligence (DGFI)
5	Major General	Mohabbat Jan Chowdhury	1979	1981
6	Major General	Mohammad Abdul Hamid	1981	1987
7	Major General	Mohammad Abdul Latif	1987	1990
16	Major General	A S M Nazrul Islam	1999	2001
17	Major General	Mohammad Abdul Halim	2001	2003
18	Major General	Rezzakul Haider Chowdhury	2003	2004
19	Major General	Sadik Hasan Rumi	2004	2006
20	Major General	A T M Amin	2006	2007
21	Brigadier General	Chowdhury Fazlul Bari	2007	2008
22	Major General	Golam Mohammad	2008	2009
23	Major General	Molla Fazle Akbar	2009	2011
24	Major General	Sheikh Mamun Khaled	2011	2013
25	Major General	Mohammad Akbar Hossain	2013	2017
26	Major General	Mohammad Saiful Abedin	2017	2020
27	Major General	Mohammad Saiful Alam	2020	2021
28	Major General	Ahmed Tabrez Shams Chowdhury	2021	2022
29	Major General	Hamidul Haque	2022	2024
30	Major General	Md. Faizur Rahman	2024	14 October, 2024
31	Major General	Jahangir Alam	14 October, 2024	22 February 2026
32	Major General	Mohammad Kaiser Rashid Chowdhury	23 February 2026	Present
