= Sina Ibn Jamali =

Retired Bangladeshi general

President of the Bangladesh Cricket Board
- In office 19 July 2007 – 23 September 2009
- Preceded by: M Abdul Aziz
- Succeeded by: Mustafa Kamal

Military service
- Allegiance: Bangladesh
- Branch/service: Bangladesh Army
- Years of service: 1976–2009
- Rank: Lieutenant General
- Unit: East Bengal Regiment
- Commands: Commandant of National Defense College; Chief of General Staff at Army Headquarters; GOC of 24th Infantry Division; Adjutant General at Army Headquarters; Director Military Operations of Army Headquarters; Commander of 46th Independent Infantry Brigade
- Battles/wars: Chittagong Hill Tracts conflict

Sina Ibn Jamali, awc, psc is a retired lieutenant general of the Bangladesh Army. During his tenures he served as director military operations; adjutant general, Bangladesh Army; general officer commanding of 24 Infantry Division, Chittagong; and chief of general staff in Army Headquarters. He also served as the president of the Bangladesh Cricket Board from August 2007 to September 2009. He is a corporate adviser at Radiant Pharmaceuticals Ltd, MD & CEO of Radiant Nutraceuticals Ltd, Radiant Distribution Ltd and Pharmacil Ltd.

== Education ==
Sina Ibn Jamali studied at Mirzapur Cadet College. He completed a Master of Defense Studies (MDS) and is a graduate of Defense Services Command and Staff College, Mirpur; Staff College, Quetta, Pakistan; and Army War College. He is a graduate of the 4th BMA short course.

== Career ==
He commanded two infantry battalions, an infantry brigade, and an infantry division. He took part in counter insurgency operations in the Chittagong Hill Tracts.

On 24 December 2005, he replaced Major General Iqbal Karim Bhuiyan as the general officer commanding (GOC) of 24 Infantry Division, Chittagong. Before that, he served as adjutant general of the army.

He was the colonel commandant of the 'Corps of Military Police' of the Bangladesh Army. From 14 May 2009 to 31 October 2009, he served as the commandant of the National Defense College.

He was appointed as chief of general staff of the Bangladesh Army by the previous military caretaker government when they dissolved the existing board.

He was appointed chairman of the Local Organising Committee for the 2011 Cricket World Cup in July 2009. The Bangladesh cricket team won their first test series against the West Indies during his presidency, in July 2009.
