= National Defence College (Bangladesh) =

War college in Dhaka

- Seal of the National Defence College
- Abbreviation: NDC
- Formation: 1996
- Type: War college
- Headquarters: Mirpur, Dhaka, Bangladesh
- Location: Mirpur Cantonment, Dhaka
- Region served: Bangladesh
- Official language: Bengali, English
- Commandant: Lt Gen Muhammad Faizur Rahman
- Affiliations: Armed Forces Division
- Website: ndc.gov.bd

The National Defence College (abbreviated as NDC) is a staff college for strategic training of civil and military officers of Bangladesh. It is located in the Mirpur Cantonment in Dhaka, Bangladesh.

== History ==
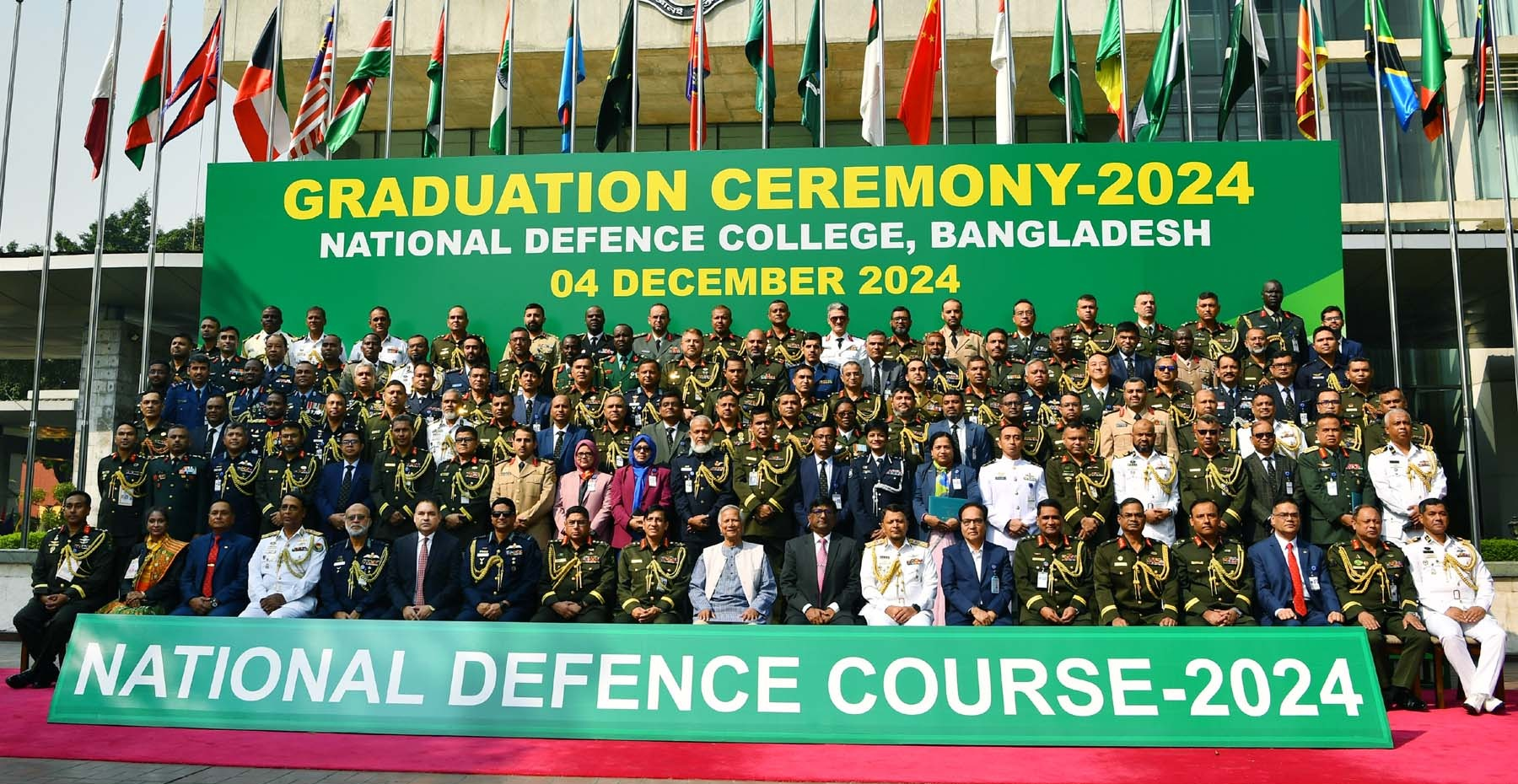
Graduates of NDC course 2024 with chief adviser Muhammad Yunus on 4 December 2024.

The college was established on 7 December 1996 and started its operations on 10 January 1999. The college runs three courses: National Defence Course, Armed Forces War Course and Capstone Course.

The aim of the National Defence Course (ND Course) is to prepare selected senior officers of the armed forces, the civil services and the allied countries for taking on roles which are national security and development. Meanwhile, the Capstone Course on national security and strategic studies is designed to enhance knowledge, skills and networks of course members

== Armed Forces War College ==
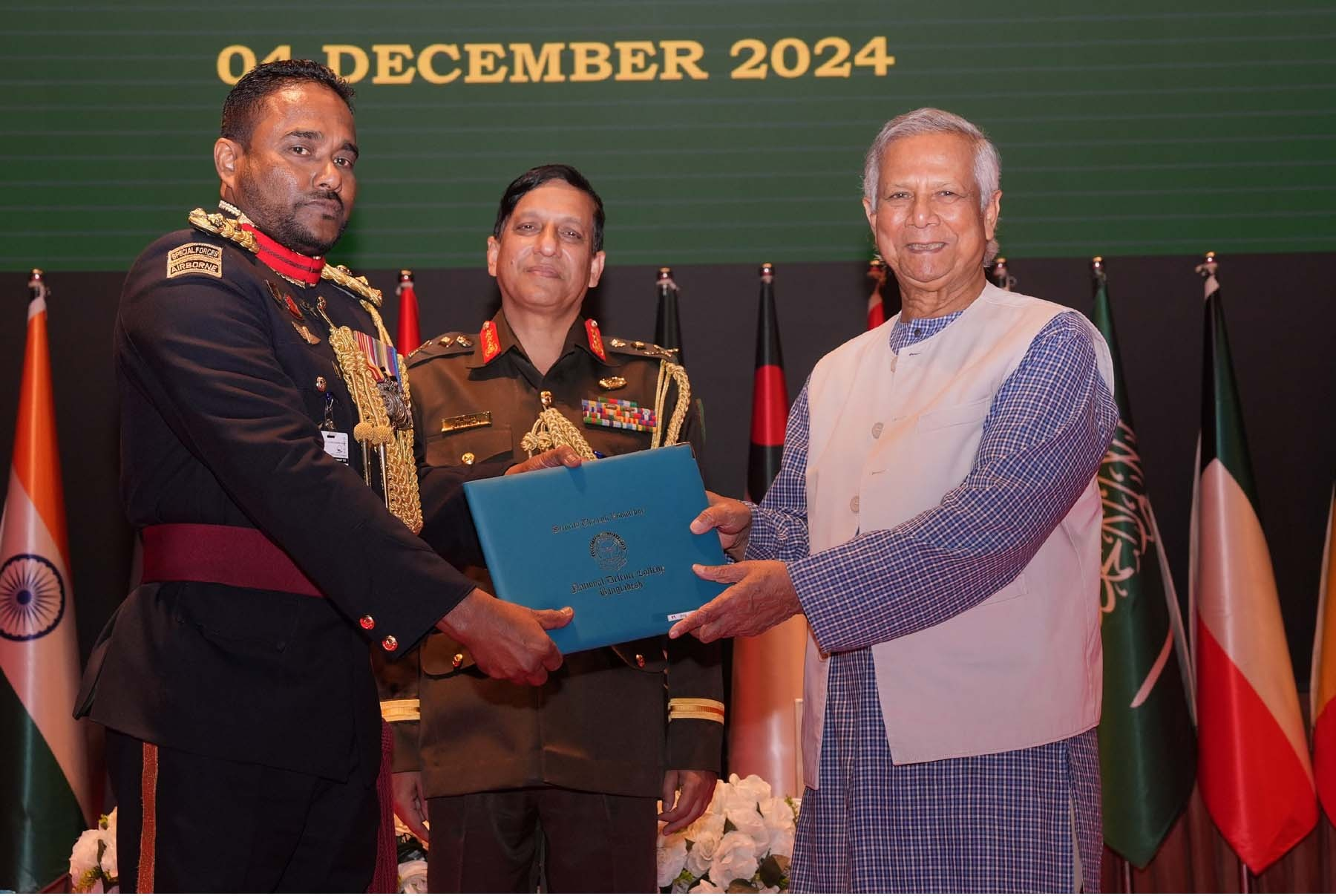
Muhammad Yunus with a graduate of the armed forces war college on 4 December 2024.

Armed Forces War College was established in 2001 under the National Defence College. It is headed by the Commandant of the National Defence College.

It offers the Armed Forces War Course (AFWC), which is a joint services course which focuses on operational level planning and conduct of war. The 44-weeks Course is divided into four terms. Each term is of 10 to 12 weeks.

== List of Commandants ==
Sl No.	Name	Term start	Term end	Unit
1	Major General; Abul Muneem Mansur Ahmed	10 January 1999	20 February 2000	East Bengal Regiment
2	Major General; Hasan Mashhud Chowdhury	1 March 2000	31 December 2000	Frontier Force Regiment (PA)
3	Major General; Abu Kaisar Fazlul Kabir	14 January 2001	26 November 2001	Corps of Engineers
4	Major General; Jiban Kanai Das	10 January 2002	16 January 2003	East Bengal Regiment
5	Major General; Aminul Karim	4 February 2003	1 January 2004	Regiment of Artillery
6	Lieutenant General; Zahirul Alam	4 January 2004	12 June 2008	East Bengal Regiment
7	Lieutenant General; Aminul Karim	15 June 2008	12 March 2009	Regiment of Artillery
8	Lieutenant General; Sina Ibn Jamali	14 May 2009	31 October 2009	East Bengal Regiment
9	Major General; A. K. M. Muzahid Uddin	1 November 2009	23 June 2011	Corps of Engineers
10	Lieutenant General; Mollah Fazle Akbar	24 June 2011	16 February 2015	Regiment of Artillery
11	Lieutenant General; Chowdhury Hasan Sarwardy	17 February 2015	31 May 2018	East Bengal Regiment
12	Lieutenant General; Sheikh Mamun Khaled	11 August 2018	31 October 2020	Corps of Signals
13	Lieutenant General; Ataul Hakim Sarwar Hasan	30 November 2020	13 January 2021	Bangladesh Infantry Regiment
14	Lieutenant General; Akbar Hossain	14 January 2021	10 November 2023	Regiment of Artillery
15	Lieutenant General; Saiful Alam	11 February 2024	6 August 2024	East Bengal Regiment
16	Lieutenant General; Mohammad Shaheenul Haque	6 August 2024	26 February 2026	East Bengal Regiment
17	Lieutenant General Faizur Rahman	26 February 2026	Incumbent	Bangladesh Infantry Regiment

== Notable alumni ==
- Lieutenant general Tukur Yusufu Buratai the Chief of Staff Nigerian Army (2015–2021).
- Air Marshal Jasjit Singh Kler VM, Director General (Inspection and Safety) of Indian Air Force.
- Colonel Ismaon Zainie, Chief of Staff of the Joint Force Headquarters of the Royal Brunei Armed Forces
- Lieutenant General Alok Singh Kler, VSM, General Officer Commanding-in-Chief, South Western Command, Indian Army

== See also ==
- Defence Services Command and Staff College (Bangladesh)
- Bangladesh University of Professionals
