= MA Halim =

Director General (Retired) of Forces Intelligence

- এম এ হালিম
- Military career
- Allegiance: Bangladesh
- Branch: Bangladesh Army
- Rank: Major General

MA Halim is a retired major general of the Bangladesh Army. He was the director general of forces intelligence. On 27 November 2018, he and 150 retired army officers joined the Awami League. From 15 May 1989 to 30 May 1995, he served as the engineer-in-chief of the Bangladesh Army.
