= Muhammad Faizur Rahman =

Bangladeshi Lieutenant General

Faizur Rahman
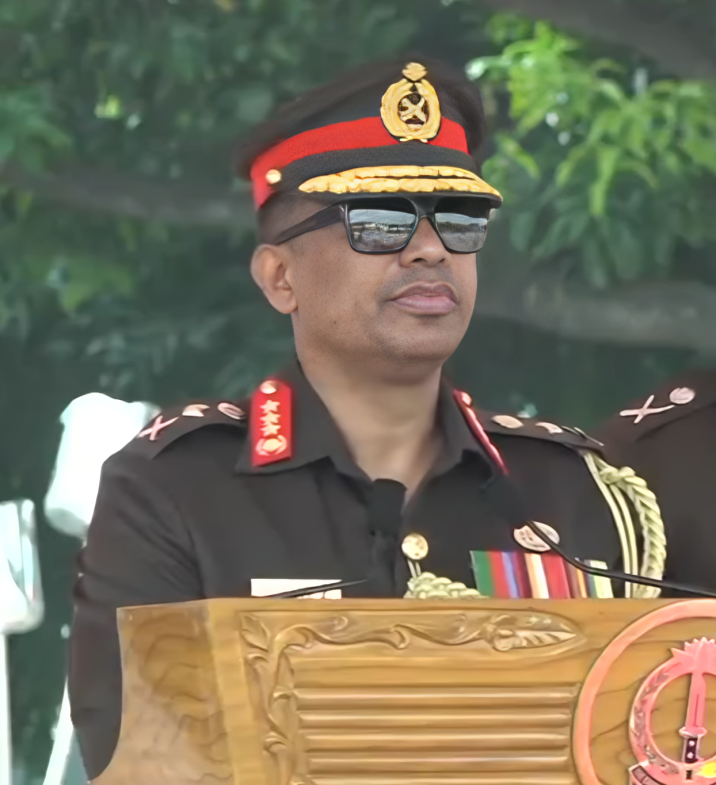
- Rahman in 2025
- Born: 23 June 1970 (age 56); Devidwar, Comilla
- Education: Bangladesh Military Academy
- Military career
- Allegiance: Bangladesh
- Branch: Bangladesh Army
- Service years: 1990–present
- Rank: Lieutenant General
- Unit: Bangladesh Infantry Regiment
- Commands: Commandant of National Defence College; Quartermaster General at Army Headquarters; Director General of Directorate General of Forces Intelligence; Commandant of Defence Services Command and Staff College; GOC of 66th Infantry Division; Commander of 203rd Infantry Brigade; Commander of 97th Infantry Brigade
- Awards: Sena Gourab Padak(SGP); Bishishto Seba Padak (BSP); Independence Day Award; Sword of Honour (BMA)

Muhammad Faizur Rahman (Note: SGP BSP ndc afwc psc) is a three-star general and incumbent commandant of National Defence College. Prior to this, he served as the quartermaster general of Bangladesh Army. Before that, he served as DG of Directorate-General of Forces Intelligence. He served as the 28th commandant of Defence Services Command and Staff College (DSCSC). Prior to join here, he was GOC of the 66 Infantry Division, Bangladesh Army and area commander, Rangpur Area. He also served as the commandant of Army Security Unit of Bangladesh Army.

== Military career ==
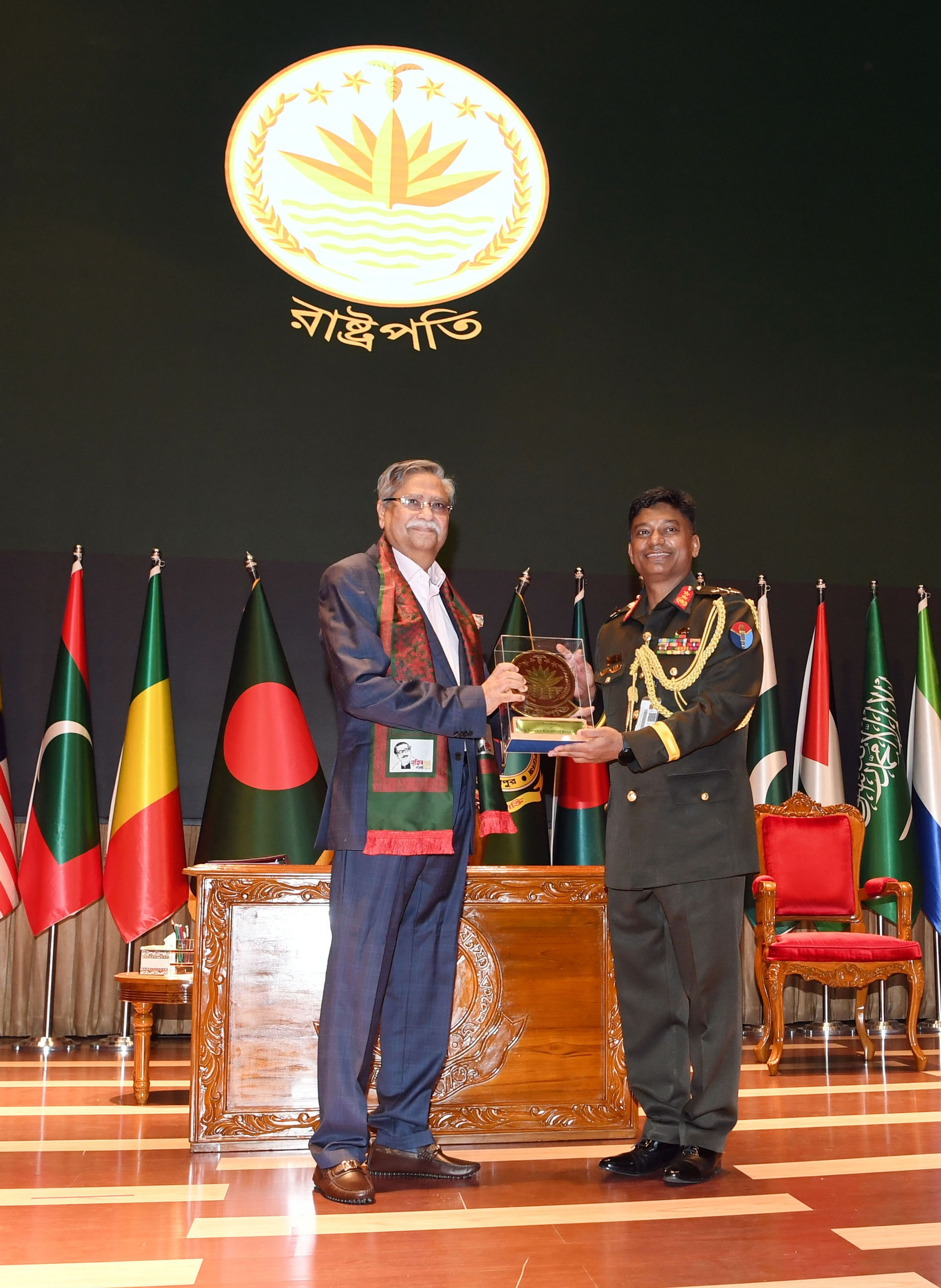
President Shahabuddin presenting a crest to Rahman in 2023

Faizur was commissioned from Bangladesh Military Academy on 21 December 1990 with 23rd BMA Long Course. He is an ex cadet of Pabna Cadet College. During his military career he served as senior instructor and faculty member of Defence Services Command and Staff College and also as directing staff and faculty member of Armed Force War College under National Defence College.

As brigadier general he served as commandant of Army Security Unit at Dhaka, commander of the 203rd Infantry Brigade at Khagrachhari and the 97th Infantry Brigade at Bandarban. He was ameliorated to major general and posted as general officer commanding of 66th Infantry Division and area commander Rangpur area. During his tenure, he arranged and conducted the exercise on Swarna Dwip in Noakhali name "Joint Manoeuvre Exercise-2022". Faizur Rahman was also the chairman of Bangladesh Army University of Science and Technology at Saidpur.

Faizur was then designated as the commandant of Defence Services Command and Staff College on 11 May 2022. He was later appointed as director general of Directorate General of Forces Intelligence on 12 August 2024 succeeding major general Hamidul Haque.

As part of an army resuffle, Faizur was promoted to lieutenant general and made quartermaster general in October 2024 and was later made the commandant of the National Defence College on 26 February 2026. He also appointed prestigious 7th Colonel Commandant of Corps of Military Police on 29th December 2025 at CMPC&S.
