= Mohammad Saiful Alam =

Bangladeshi Army general

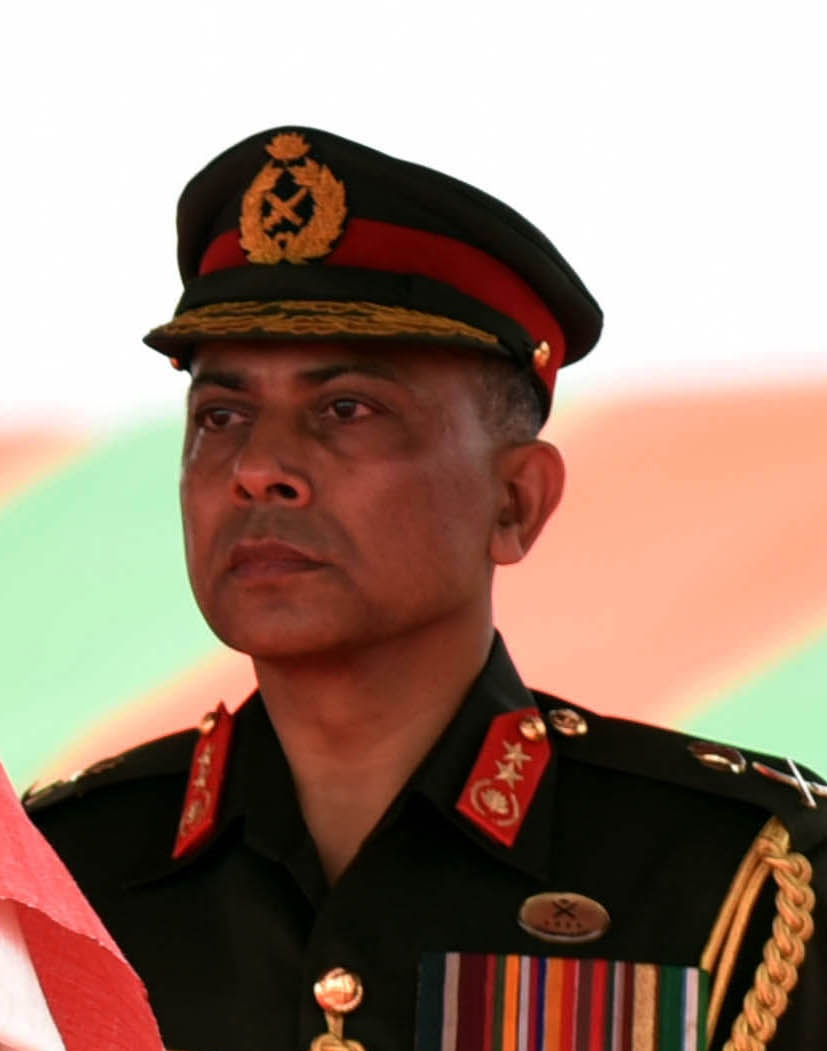
- Saiful Alam at the Barisal Cantonment
- Born: 11 January 1967 (age 59); Gopalganj, East Pakistan, Pakistan
- Military career
- Allegiance: Bangladesh
- Branch: Bangladesh Army
- Service years: 1986–2024
- Rank: Lieutenant General
- Unit: East Bengal Regiment
- Commands: Commandant of National Defence College; Quartermaster General at Army Headquarters; Director General of Directorate General of Forces Intelligence; GOC of 7th Infantry Division; GOC of 11th Infantry Division; Commandant of School of Infantry and Tactics; Commandant of Bangladesh Military Academy
- Awards: Sword of Honour (BMA); Senabahini Padak (SBP); Oshamanno Sheba Padak (OSP); Sena Utkorsho Padak (SUP)

Mohammad Saiful Alam (Note: SBP OSP SUP afwc psc PhD) is a retired three-star general in the Bangladesh Army who was booted of his duties as the ambassador at the Ministry of Foreign Affairs. He was the antecedent commandant of the National Defence College. He also served as the quartermaster general of the army and the director general of the Directorate General of Forces Intelligence. Moreover, Alam commanded two infantry divisions.

== Early life ==
Saiful Alam was born in Gopalganj. He passed his SSC and HSC from Jhenidah Cadet College in 1982 and 1984, respectively.

== Career ==
Alam was commissioned on 27 June 1986 in the 14th Bangladesh Military Academy Long Course. He won the Sword of Honour and Academic Gold Medal in his BMA long course. He has commanded an infantry brigade under the 11th Infantry Division. After serving as the general officer commanding of the 11th Infantry Division and area commander, Bogura Area in Bogra Cantonment, he was appointed as director general of the Directorate General of Forces Intelligence (DGFI) on 28 February 2020. Prior to his duties in Bogra, he was the general officer commanding (GOC) of the 7th Infantry Division and area commander of Barishal Area, Barisal Sheikh Hasina cantonment. He served as the directing staff of the Defence Services Command & Staff College, Mirpur. He also served as the commandant of the Bangladesh Military Academy (BMA) and the School of Infantry & Tactics (SI&T). He was a platoon commander in Bangladesh Military Academy (BMA).

On 5 July 2021, Alam was appointed the quarter master general of the Bangladesh Army at army headquarters.

On 29 January 2024, he was appointed as the commandant of the National Defence College (NDC), Bangladesh. In August 2024, he was posted to the Ministry of Foreign Affairs.

== Controversies ==
=== Forced Retirement from Army and Allegation of Corruption ===
On 3 September 2024, his bank account was seized by the Bangladesh Financial Intelligence Unit (BFIU) of Bangladesh Bank. At the same time, the account in the name of his wife and children and the bank account of the business owned by them have also been asked to be suspended. On 11 September 2024, he was sent into mandatory retirement. Two former director generals of the Directorate-General of Forces Intelligence, Major General Hamidul Haque and Lieutenant General Ahmed Tabrez Shams Chowdhury, were also sent into forced retirement with him. On 27 February 2025, joint forces seize Tk2.42 crore from his house.

=== Role in Enforced Disappearances and Aynaghar ===
Following the ouster of Sheikh Hasina's regime by the July uprising in August 2024, the interim government established the Commission of Inquiry on Enforced Disappearances on 27 August 2024 to investigate state-sponsored abductions and secret detentions committed by the Hasina regime. In its findings, the commission named Mohammad Saiful Alam among twenty-four officials alleged to have been involved in enforced disappearances, specifically citing his tenure as the Director General of the Directorate General of Forces Intelligence from February 2020 to July 2021.

On 18 November 2024, acting on recommendations from the inquiry commission, the Security Services Division of the Ministry of Home Affairs instructed the Department of Immigration and Passports to cancel his passport to prevent travel abroad during ongoing investigations.
