= Hamidul Haque =

Bangladeshi army general

- হামিদুল হক
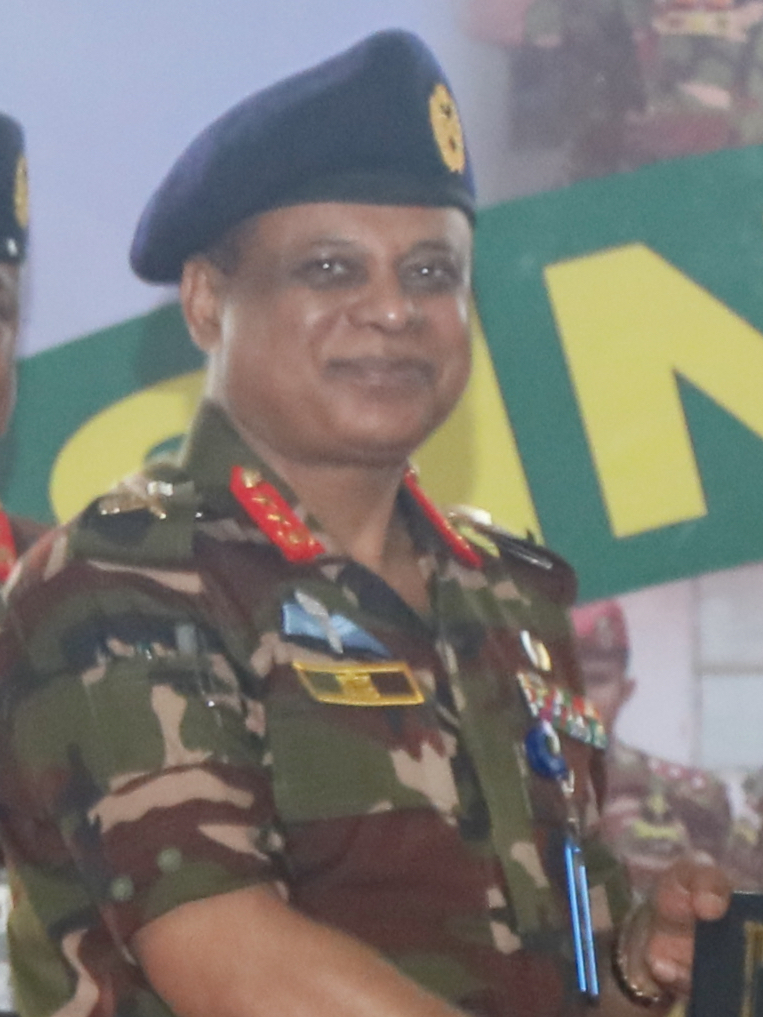
- Haque in Jalalabad Cantonment (2022)
- Born: 23 June 1970 (age 56); Eidgaon, East Pakistan, Pakistan, [Now Bangladesh]
- Spouse: Nusrat Jahan Haque
- Children: 3
- Military career
- Allegiance: Bangladesh
- Branch: Bangladesh Army
- Service years: 1990 – 2024
- Rank: Major General
- Unit: East Bengal Regiment
- Commands: Managing Director of Bangladesh Machine Tools Factory; Director General of Directorate General of Forces Intelligence; GOC of 17th Infantry Division; Commander of 203rd Infantry Brigade; Commander of 99th Composite Brigade

Hamidul Haque (Note: nswc, psc) (born 23 June 1970) is a retired two-star officer of the Bangladesh Army who was booted of his duties as managing director of Bangladesh Machine Tools Factory. Prior to that, he served as the director general of the Directorate-General of Forces Intelligence and commanded two infantry brigades and one infantry division.

== Early life ==
Haque was born on 23 June 1970 in the village of Palakata in Eidgah Union, Eidgaon Upazila, Cox's Bazar District, East Pakistan, Pakistan. He completed his secondary school at Eidgah Model High School and high school at Chittagong College. He was admitted to the Bangladesh Military Academy in 1986 and received his commission with the 22nd BMA long course on 22 June 1990 in the East Bengal Regiment.

== Career ==
Haque served as platoon leader, company 2 i/c and battalion GSO - 3 in the East Bengal Regiment. He also served as the ADC to COAS Lt. General Mustafizur Rahman as a captain from 1998 to 2000. Haque was promoted to major in 2001 and a battalion 2 i/c of the 20 East Bengal until 2003. Thereafter, he was company commander in the East Bengal Regiment, adjutant in BMA, and brigade major. Promoted to lieutenant colonel in 2007, Haque joined the DGFI, where he was posted until 2010. Promoted to colonel in 2010, Haque served as col. staff of 19 Inf Div in Ghatail. Thereafter, he became battalion commanding officer of 7 East Bengal Regiment from 2011 till 2014. Haque was promoted to brigadier in 2014 and joined the Directorate General Of Forces Intelligence, where he was till 2018, when he commanded an infantry brigade in the Chittagong Hill Tracts. Haque commanded the 99 Composite Brigade that is responsible for the security of the Padma Bridge from 2020 to 2022. He has served in the United Nations peacekeeping forces in Sierra Leone and South Sudan.

Haque commanded the 203rd Infantry Brigade of the Bangladesh Army in the Chittagong Hill Tracts and was commander of the Khagrachari region. He met residents of Khagrachari District and called for them to surrender any illegal weapons on 25 September 2018. He has also served as the college secretary of the National Defence College and member of the college's governing body. He became director general of the Directorate-General of Forces Intelligence in October 2022.

Haque was sent to mandatory retirement on 12 September 2024 along with two former director generals of the Directorate-General of Forces Intelligence, Lieutenant General Saiful Alam, and Lieutenant General Tabrez Shams. Major General Faizur Rahman replaced Haque as director general of Directorate-General of Forces Intelligence.

== Role in Enforced Disappearances and Aynaghar ==
Following the fall of the Sheikh Hasina administration in August 2024, the Commission of Inquiry on Enforced Disappearances was established on 27 August 2024 to investigate state-sponsored abductions and secret detention centers also known as Aynaghar. In its findings, the commission named Hamidul Haque among twenty-four officials alleged to have been involved in enforced disappearances, citing his role as the Director General of the Directorate General of Forces Intelligence from October 2022 until the collapse of the government in August 2024.

On 18 November 2024, acting on recommendations from the inquiry commission, the Security Services Division of the Ministry of Home Affairs instructed the Department of Immigration & Passports to cancel his passport to prevent travel abroad during ongoing investigations.

== Personal life ==
Haque is married to Nusrat Jahan Haque (née Mukta). The couple have three sons. Haque's second son won the sword of honour at the Bangladesh Military Academy in December 2025 with the 89th BMA long course.
