= Mohammad Saiful Abedin =

Retired Bangladeshi Major General and former DG OF DGFI

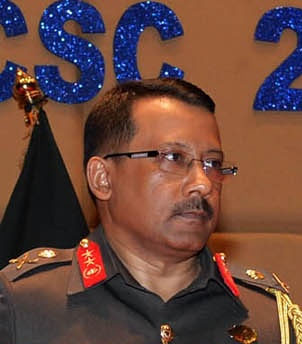
- Born: 1964 (age 61–62)
- Military career
- Allegiance: Bangladesh
- Branch: Bangladesh Army
- Service years: 1986–2022
- Rank: Major General
- Unit: Bangladesh Infantry Regiment
- Commands: GOC of 24th Infantry Division; Director General of Directorate General of Forces Intelligence; Commandant of Defence Services Command and Staff College; Commander of 71st Mechanized Brigade
- Conflicts: UNOCI; UNIKOM
- Awards: Sword of Honour (BMA); Bishishto Seba Padak (BSP)

Mohammad Saiful Abedin, BSP, ndc, psc is a retired major general in the Bangladesh Army. He most notably served as the director general of DGFI.

== Early life and education ==
Abedin graduated from Mirzapur Cadet College in 1984. He was selected at the ISSB for the 15th (BMA) Long Course and was commissioned in the East Bengal Regiment on 25 December 1986. He was awarded with the coveted 'Sword of Honour' for best all-round performance and 'Osmani Gold Medal' for best academic performance at his commission.

He obtained Bachelor of Science from Chittagong University, Masters in Defence Studies from National University of Bangladesh and Master of Business Administration from Royal Roads University, Canada. At present he is pursuing M.Phil. on strategy and development under Bangladesh University of Professionals and PhD on international relations under Jahangirnagar University.

== Career ==
He served as 2 i/c of Delta Company of 4th East Bengal Regiment, as well as ADC to General Mohammad Abdul Latif, the DG of Bangladesh Rifles from 1991 to 1992. Abedin was the adjutant of Mymensingh Girls' Cadet College. He also served in 71 Mechanized Brigade as commander.

He was general officer commanding (GOC) of the 24th Infantry Division and area commander, Chattogram Area. He is the former director general of DGFI. He previously served as commandant of Defence Services Command & Staff College (DSCSC).

He retired from active service in July 2022.

== Controversies ==
=== Allegations of coercion against Chief Justice Surendra Kumar Sinha ===
In 2017, Chief Justice Surendra Kumar Sinha alleged that Major General Abedin coerced him into resigning following a Supreme Court verdict that annulled the 16th amendment of the Bangladesh Constitution. Justice Sinha claimed that Major General Abedin met him in his chambers, expressing dissatisfaction with the judgment and suggesting he take a leave of absence. Subsequently, Justice Sinha reported being placed under house arrest and facing intimidation, leading to his resignation.

=== Role in Enforced Disappearances and Aynaghar ===
Following the fall of the Sheikh Hasina administration in August 2024, the Commission of Inquiry on Enforced Disappearances was established on 27 August 2024 to investigate state-sponsored abductions and secret detentions. In its findings, the commission named Mohammad Saiful Abedin among several high-ranking military officials implicated in enforced disappearances, specifically citing his tenure as the Director General of the Directorate General of Forces Intelligence from February 2017 to February 2020.

On 18 November 2024, acting on recommendations from the inquiry commission, the Security Services Division of the Ministry of Home Affairs instructed the Department of Immigration & Passports to immediately cancel his passport to prevent travel abroad. In July 2025, an investigative report by Netra News listed Abedin among ten senior army officers accused in enforced disappearance cases who had departed the country despite official travel restrictions and pending arrest warrants.
