= Sheikh Mamun Khaled =

Bangladesh Army officer

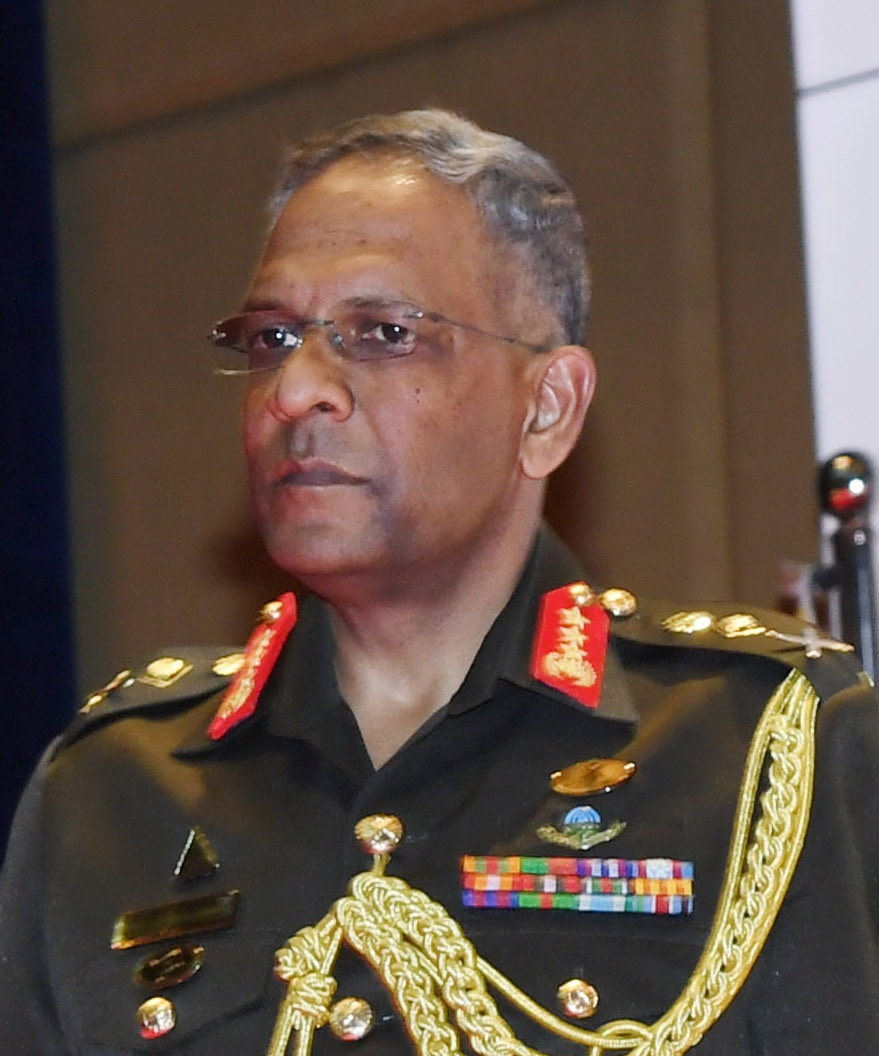
- Mamun in 2018
- Born: 21 January 1962 (age 64)
- Military career
- Allegiance: Bangladesh
- Branch: Bangladesh Army
- Service years: 1981–2020
- Rank: Lieutenant General
- Unit: Corps of Signals
- Commands: Commandant of National Defence College; Director General of Directorate General of Forces Intelligence; Commandant of Bangladesh Ordnance Factories; Vice-Chancellor of Bangladesh University of Professionals; Area Commander of Logistic Area; Chairman of Sena Kalyan Sangstha; Commander of 86th Independent Signals Brigade
- Conflicts: UNPROFOR; UNAMSIL
- Awards: Independence Day Award; Sena Utkorsho Padak(SUP); Oshamanno Sheba Padak (OSP)

Sheikh Mamun Khaled OSP, SUP is a retired lieutenant general of the Bangladesh Army and former commandant of National Defence College.

== Career ==
Mamun Khaled was a signal corps officer of Bangladesh Army from the 5th BMA long course. He served as the director of the Directorate General of Forces Intelligence (DGFI) from December 2007 to December 2010 and as the director general of the same organization from 23 June 2011, to 7 March 2013.

He was then made the vice-chancellor of the army-run Bangladesh University of Professionals. He was the first person to complete PhD in Bangladesh University of Professionals and earned the Chancellor Gold Medal.

Khaled served in a number of different positions in Bangladesh Army. He was an instructor at Military Intelligence School, Army Headquarters, colonel staff of an Infantry Division, commandant of the School of Military Intelligence, area commander logistic area. Prior to assuming as the commandant, National Defence College of Bangladesh, he was also commandant of Bangladesh Ordnance Factories.

The general also served in the UN Protection Force (UNPROFOR) in Bosnia and UN Mission in Sierra Leone (UNAMSIL).

== Role During the Pilkhana Massacre ==
The Bangladesh Rifles (BDR) mutiny in February 2009 resulted in significant loss of life, including 57 army officers. At that time, Khaled in the rank of Lieutenant General, was serving in the Directorate General of Forces Intelligence (DGFI). In a 2024 interview, he discussed the events surrounding the mutiny, indicating that despite being on the ground during the crisis, decisive action was delayed, leading to increased casualties. He suggested that prompt military intervention could have mitigated the damage.

In March 2026, Khaled was detained by the Detective Branch of Bangladesh Police in a murder case filed over the death of a protester against Sheikh Hasina in July 2024. Around the same time, two other former officers of DGFI were detained, Lieutenant General Masud Uddin Chowdhury and Lieutenant Colonel Md. Afzal Naser.

== Role in Enforced Disappearances and Aynaghar ==
Following the fall of the Sheikh Hasina administration in August 2024, the Commission of Inquiry on Enforced Disappearances was established on 27 August 2024 to investigate state-sponsored abductions and secret detention centers also known as Aynaghar. In its findings, the commission named Sheikh Mamun Khaled among former military officials implicated in enforced disappearances, citing his tenure as the Director General of the Directorate General of Forces Intelligence from 23 June 2011 to 7 March 2013.

On 18 November 2024, acting on recommendations from the inquiry commission, the Security Services Division of the Ministry of Home Affairs instructed the Department of Immigration & Passports to cancel his passport to prevent travel abroad during ongoing investigations.

== Arrest ==
On 25 March 2026, Sheikh Mamun Khaled was arrested by the Detective Branch of the Dhaka Metropolitan Police from his residence in Mirpur DOHS, Dhaka. He was placed under remand in connection with multiple cases stemming from his tenures in the Directorate General of Forces Intelligence, notably as the head of Counter Intelligence Bureau from 2007 to 2008 and director general from 2011 to 2013.
