= Counter Terrorism and Intelligence Bureau =

Intelligence agency of Bangladesh

- কাউন্টার টেররিজম অ্যান্ড ইন্টেলিজেন্স ব্যুরো

Agency overview
- Formed: 2006
- Headquarters: DGFI Building, Sadhinota Avenue, Dhaka Cantonment, Dhaka, Bangladesh
- Parent agency: Directorate General of Forces Intelligence

Counter Terrorism and Intelligence Bureau, commonly known as CTIB, is a covert intelligence bureau of the Directorate General of Forces Intelligence. The unit is tasked with counter terrorism, gathering information internal or external threats.

== History ==
The Counter Terrorism and Intelligence Bureau was established in 2006 as a specialized counterterrorism bureau within Directorate General of Forces Intelligence, amid growing concerns about domestic and transnational militant groups. Its reported responsibilities include gathering and assessing intelligence, coordinating operations, and helping prevent attacks through surveillance. CTIB is also described as working with other security agencies, including the Rapid Action Battalion and police counterterrorism units. Following the July 2016 attack on the Holey Artisan Bakery in Dhaka, Bangladesh strengthened measures such as border monitoring and efforts to counter terrorist financing.

CTIB conducts joint training exercises with Directorate General of Forces Intelligence and United States Special Forces. The United States and Bangladesh signed the Counterterrorism Cooperation Initiative on October 22, 2013, to strengthen bilateral cooperation.

== Administration ==
Counter Terrorism and Intelligence Bureau operates as a specialized bureau within the DGFI. It is led by a senior military officer from the Bangladesh Armed Forces, who is responsible for coordinating the bureau’s activities and reports to the Director General of Forces Intelligence. The director oversees CTIB’s intelligence gathering and counterterrorism operations. CTIB draws personnel from the Bangladesh Armed Forces and organizes its work through teams focused on collecting and assessing intelligence and responding to security threats. It also coordinates with other agencies, including the National Security Intelligence, to support threat assessments.

== See also ==
- National Committee for Intelligence Coordination
- Directorate General of Forces Intelligence
