= Mirzapur Cadet College =

Military high school in Bangladesh

- মির্জাপুর ক্যাডেট কলেজ

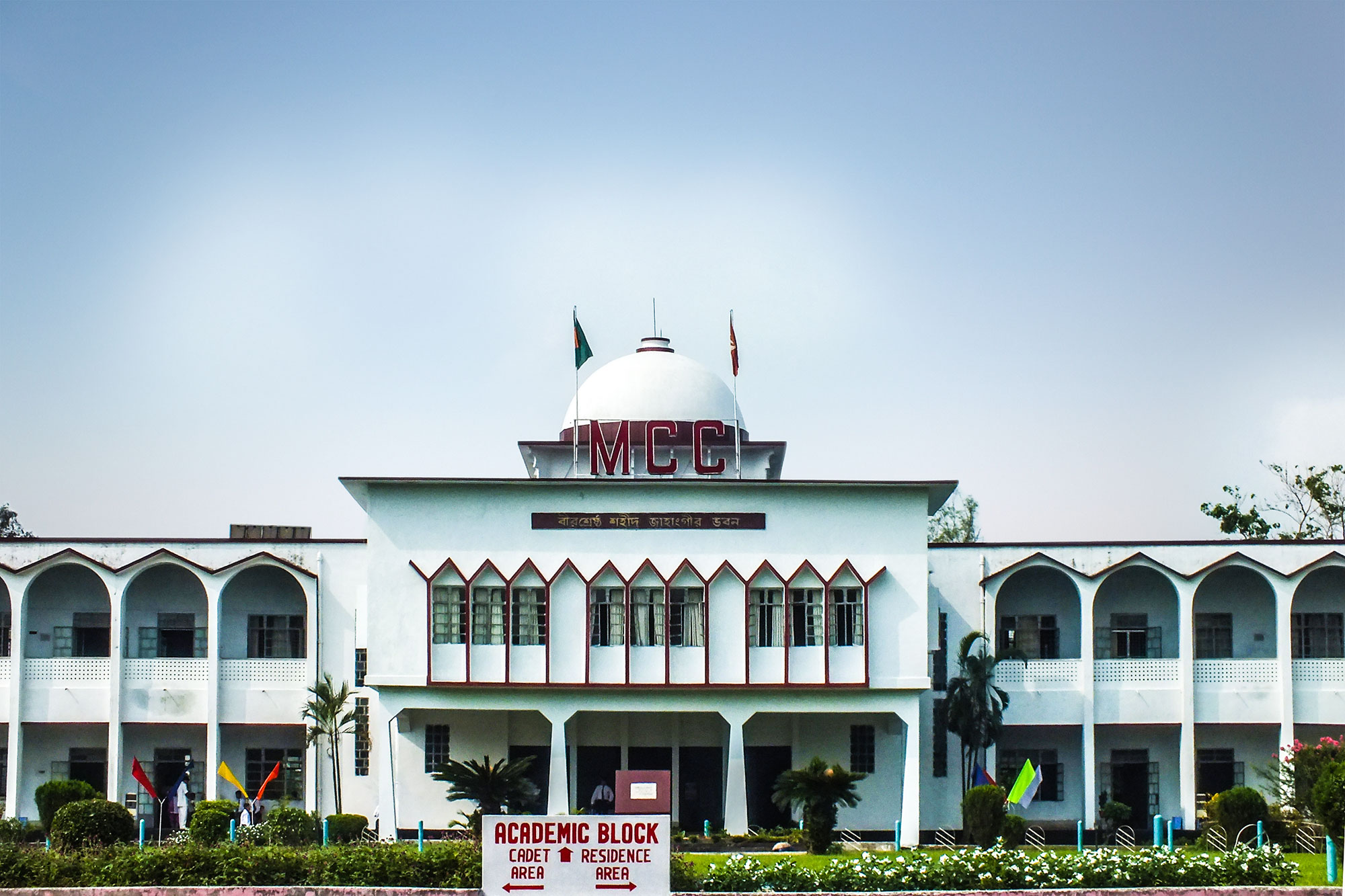
- Building of Mirzapur Cadet College

Location
- Dhaka-Tangail Trunk Road, Garai Union, Mirzapur Upazila; Tangail, Bangladesh, 1942; 24.0842°N 90.1692°E

Information
- Former name: Momenshahi Cadet College
- Motto: Knowledge is Power (বাংলা: বিদ্যাই বল)
- Established: 29 November 1963; 62 years ago
- School board: Board of Intermediate and Secondary Education, Dhaka
- Principal: Dr. Abul Kalam Azad (Acting)
- Adjutant: Maj. Abdullah Al Mamun, Psc, G
- Language: English
- Area: 95 acres (380,000 m^{2})
- Color: Maroon
- Demonym: Mirzapurian
- First Principal: Michael William Pitt
- EIIN: 133861
- Website: mcc.army.mil.bd

Mirzapur Cadet College (Bengali: মির্জাপুর ক্যাডেট কলেজ) is a military high school in Tangail, Bangladesh. Like other cadet colleges in the country, it follows the curriculum prescribed by the National Curriculum and Textbook Board (NCTB) in English medium and emphasizes extracurricular and co-curricular activities.

== Location ==
Mirzapur Cadet College is situated at 90°9' east longitude and 24°5.3' north latitude. The Bangshi River flows on the east side of the college and the Barinda River on the south and south-west side. The Footjani River joins with Barinda River at the west side. It is on the edge of Tangail District, and the nearby Kaliakair Upazila in Gazipur District HQ is 3 km from the college. The college is 8 km south of Mirzapur town, 37 km south-east of Tangail city and 58 km north-west of the capital city, Dhaka.

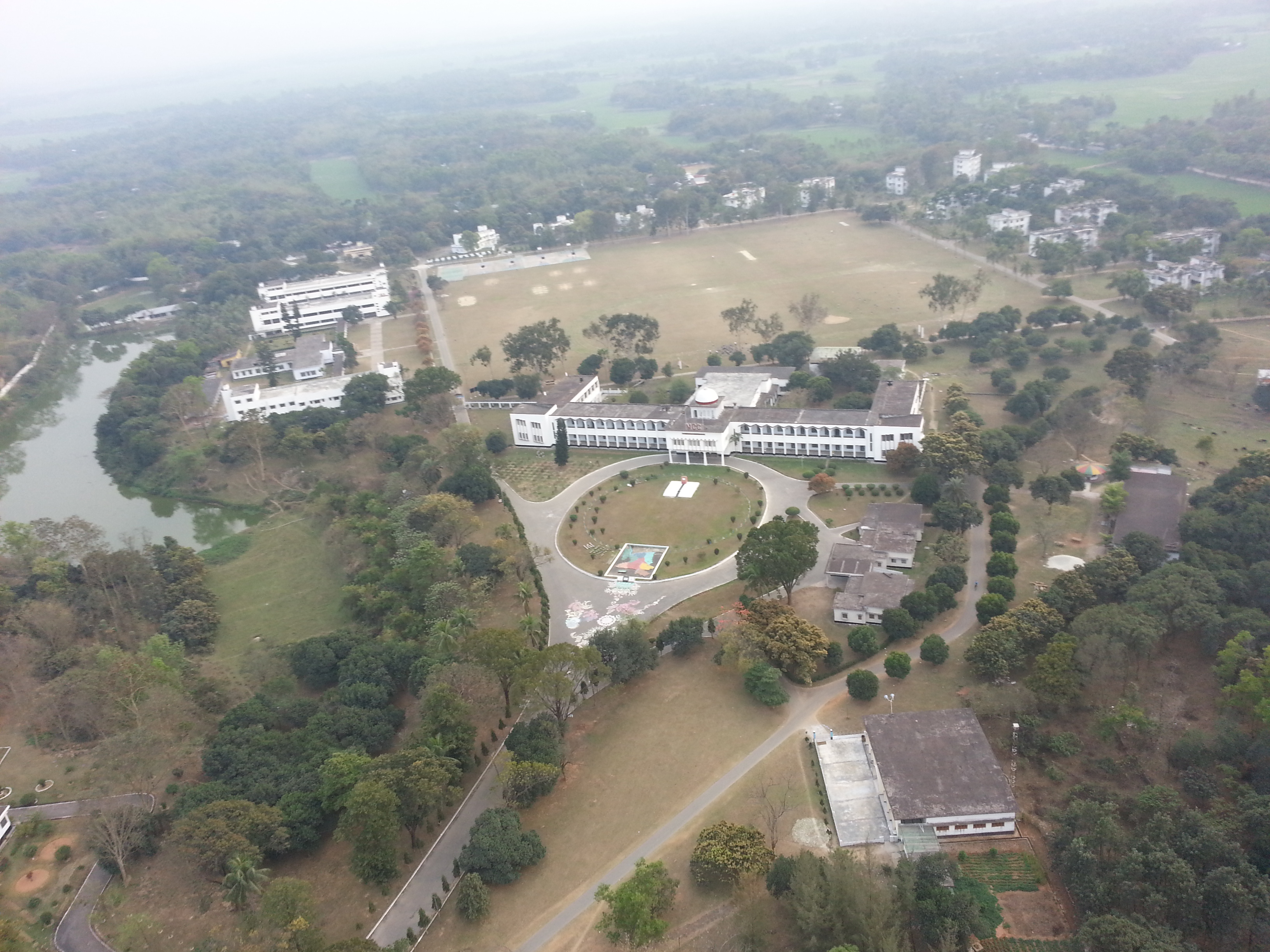
Aerial photo of MCC taken by an ex-Mirzapurian on 10 March 2014

== History ==
After the establishment of Faujderhat Cadet College in Chittagong district in 1958 and Jhenaidah Cadet College in the Khulna division in October 1963, the foundation of Momenshahi Cadet College (former name of Mirzapur Cadet College) was planned. The objective of the new college was to prepare officers for the Pakistan Army.

=== East Pakistan period ===
The then president of Pakistan Field Marshal Ayub Khan laid the foundation stone of Momenshahi Cadet College at Mirzapur Upazila in the then Mymensingh District (now Tangail district) of Bangladesh on 29 November 1963. The foundation stone is still there on the wall of the main academic building of the college.

Major General Fazle Mukim Khan formally opened the college on 9 January 1965. The first principal was Michael William Pitt.

Academic activities started from that year with intakes in Classes 7, 8 and 9.

=== Independence War period ===
After the speech on 7 March, a violent procession by an angry mob entered the college campus on the 8th. Principal Wng Comd, Sulaiman Haider Kayani closed the college and sent all the cadets home. During the independence war, the college was opened in the first week of November 1971 with Mr Wahab as acting Principal.

=== Bangladesh period ===
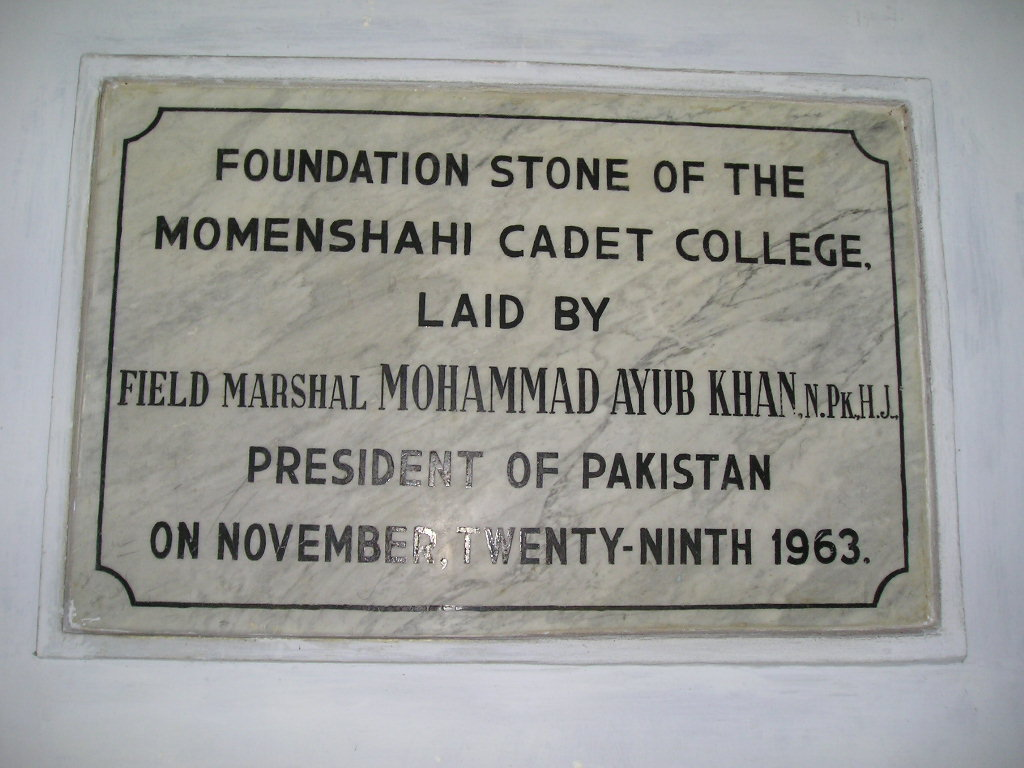
The foundation stone

Each year at thousands of 7th graders compete to earn the 50 seats available. Other cadet colleges were established after the war. Today there are 12 cadet colleges, including three for girls only.

== Academic system ==
Cadets are enrolled in the seventh grade and continue their study for six years. The Higher Secondary Certificate (HSC) is the final examination to pass.

Each class generally has fifty students. The Secondary School Certificate (SSC) and the Higher Secondary Certificate (HSC) examinations are administered under direct control of the Board of Education of Dhaka Division. Cadets secure top positions in board examinations each year. In this cadet college student apply for application to study.

=== Departments ===
- Physics
- Chemistry
- Biology
- Mathematics
- Bengali
- English
- Economics
- Civics
- History
- Islamic Studies
- Arts and crafts
- Geography
- ICT

In accordance with the National Education Policy, Mirzapur offers only the science and humanities educational sections for the cadets from the 9th grade. However, the cadets are encouraged to study science.

== Photo gallery ==
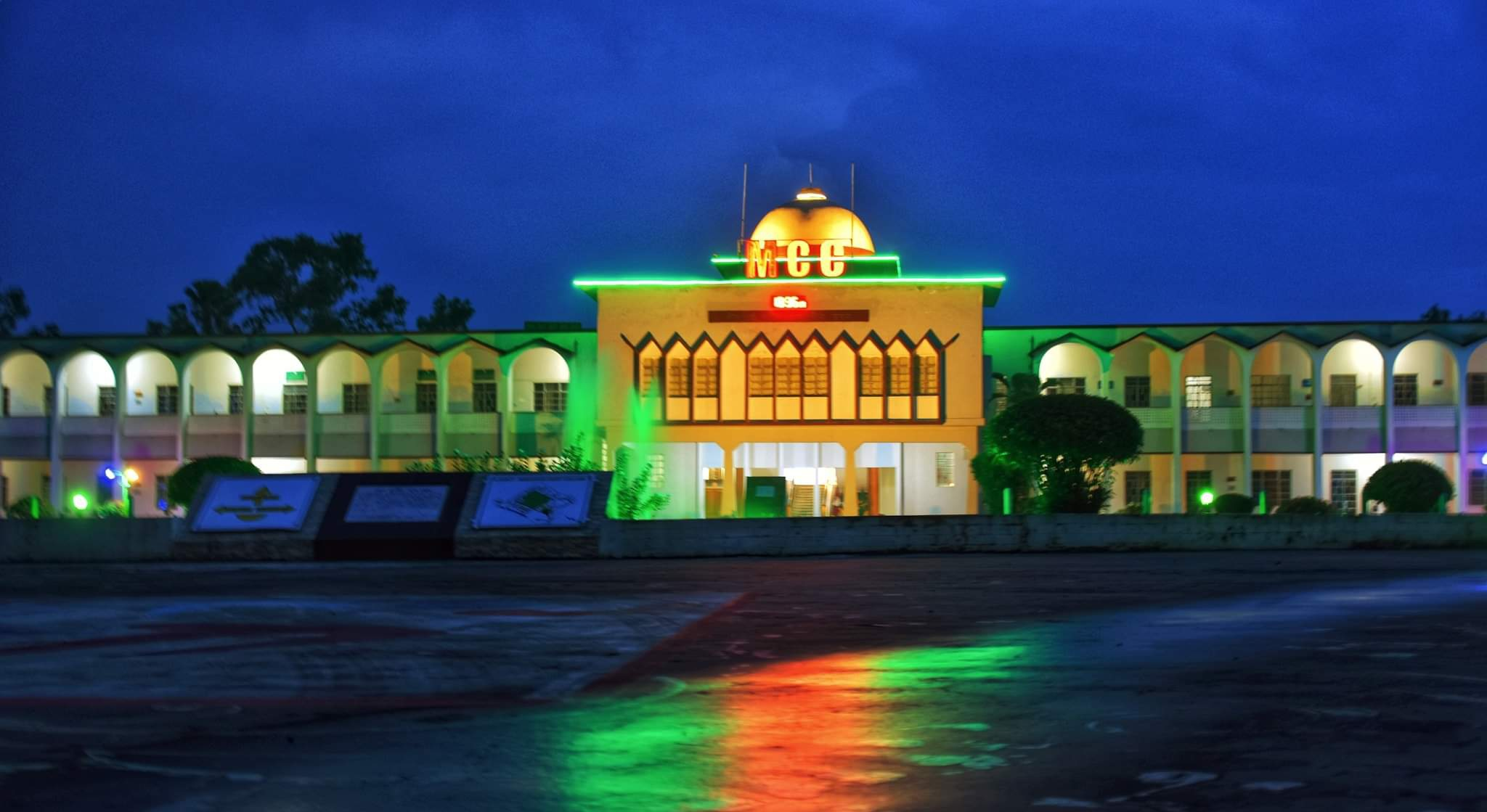
Academic Building Night View

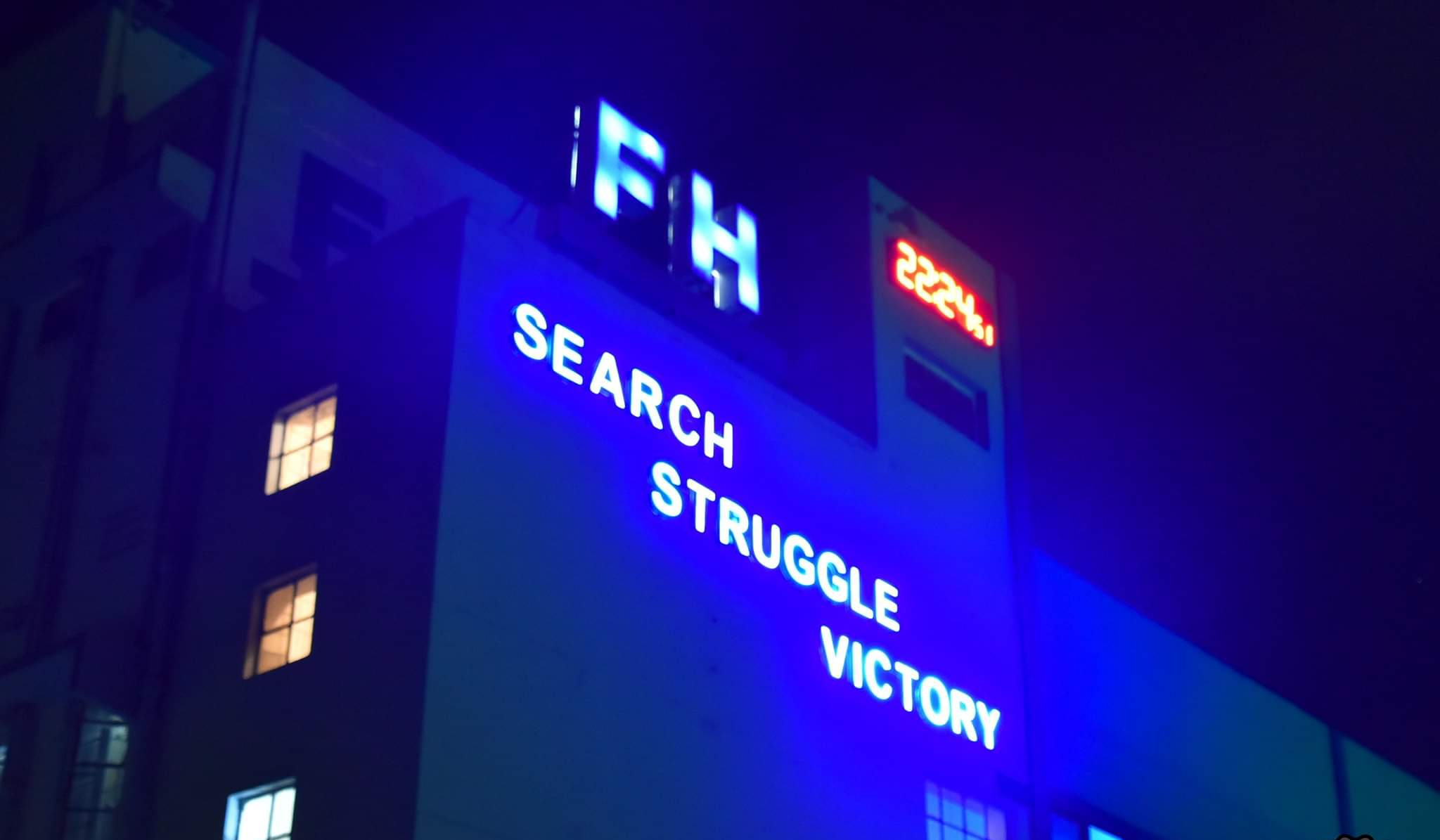
Frontal Night View of Fazlul Haque House (Present Champion House)

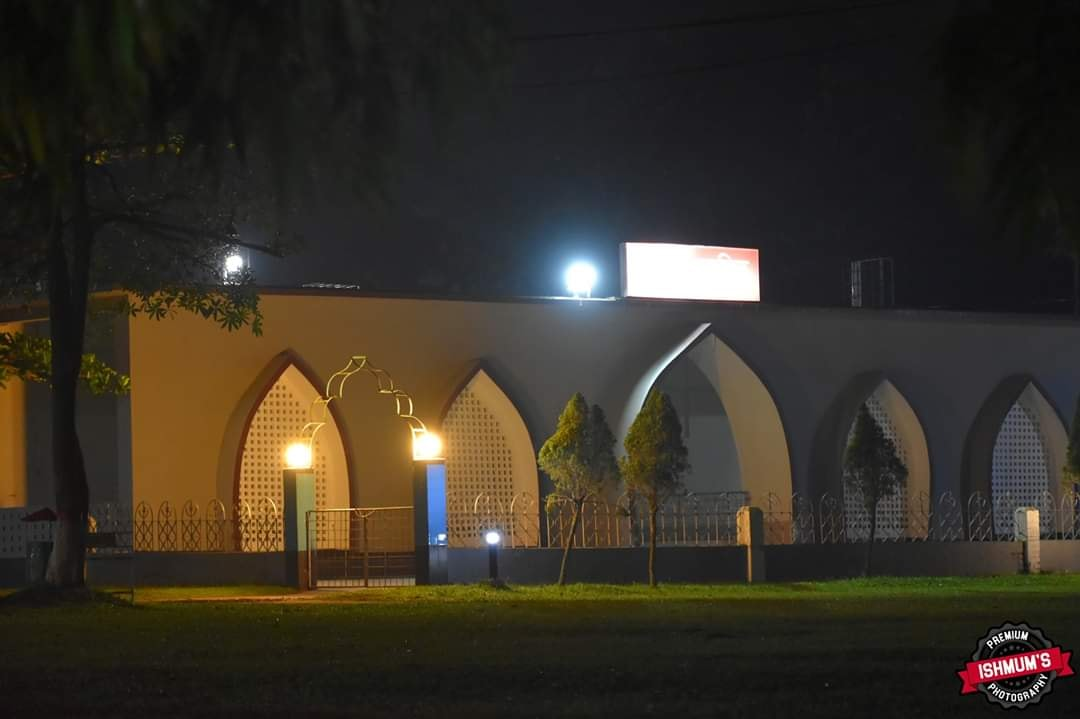
College Mosque at Night

== Infrastructure ==
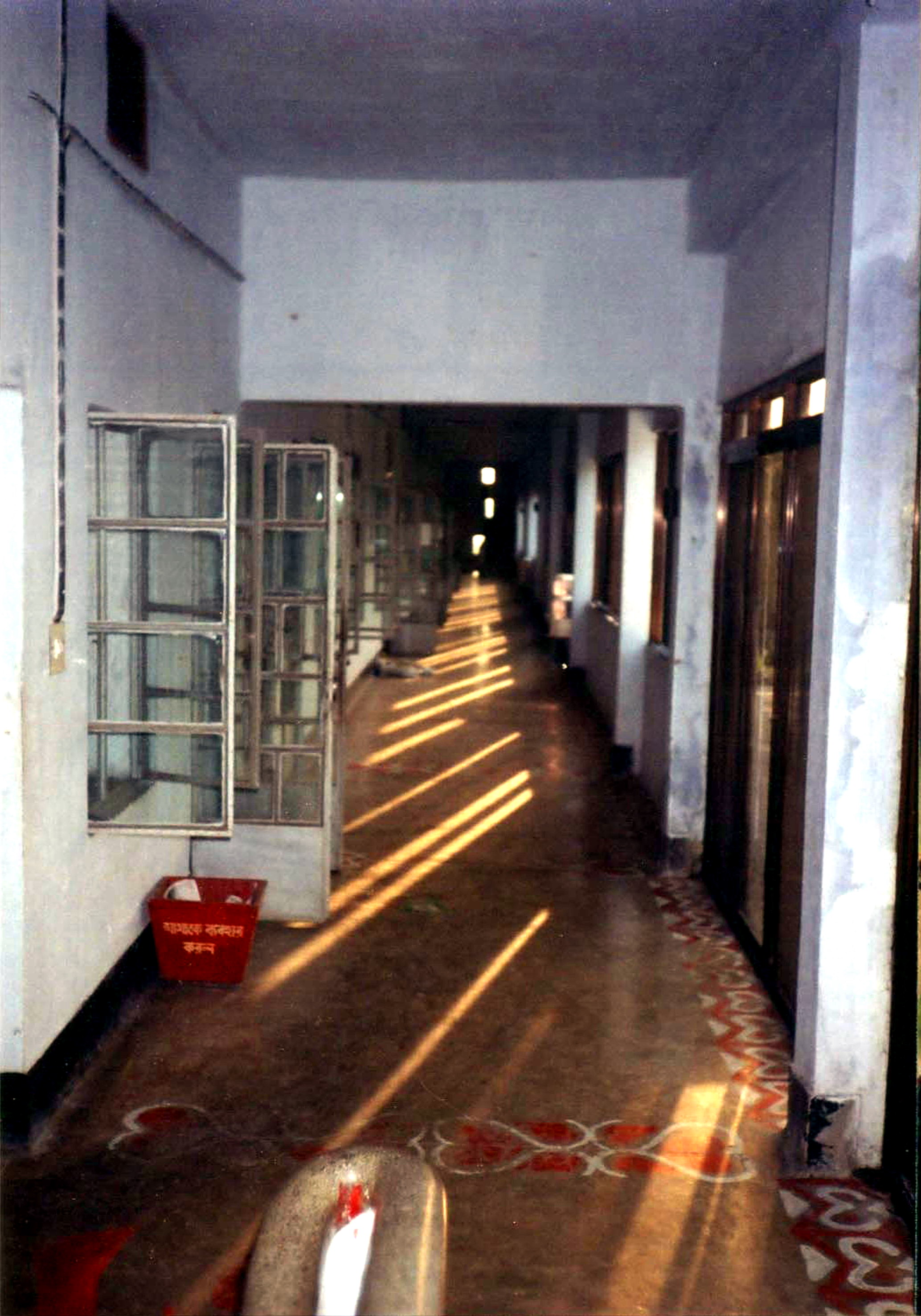
Inside Suhrawardy House

=== Museum ===
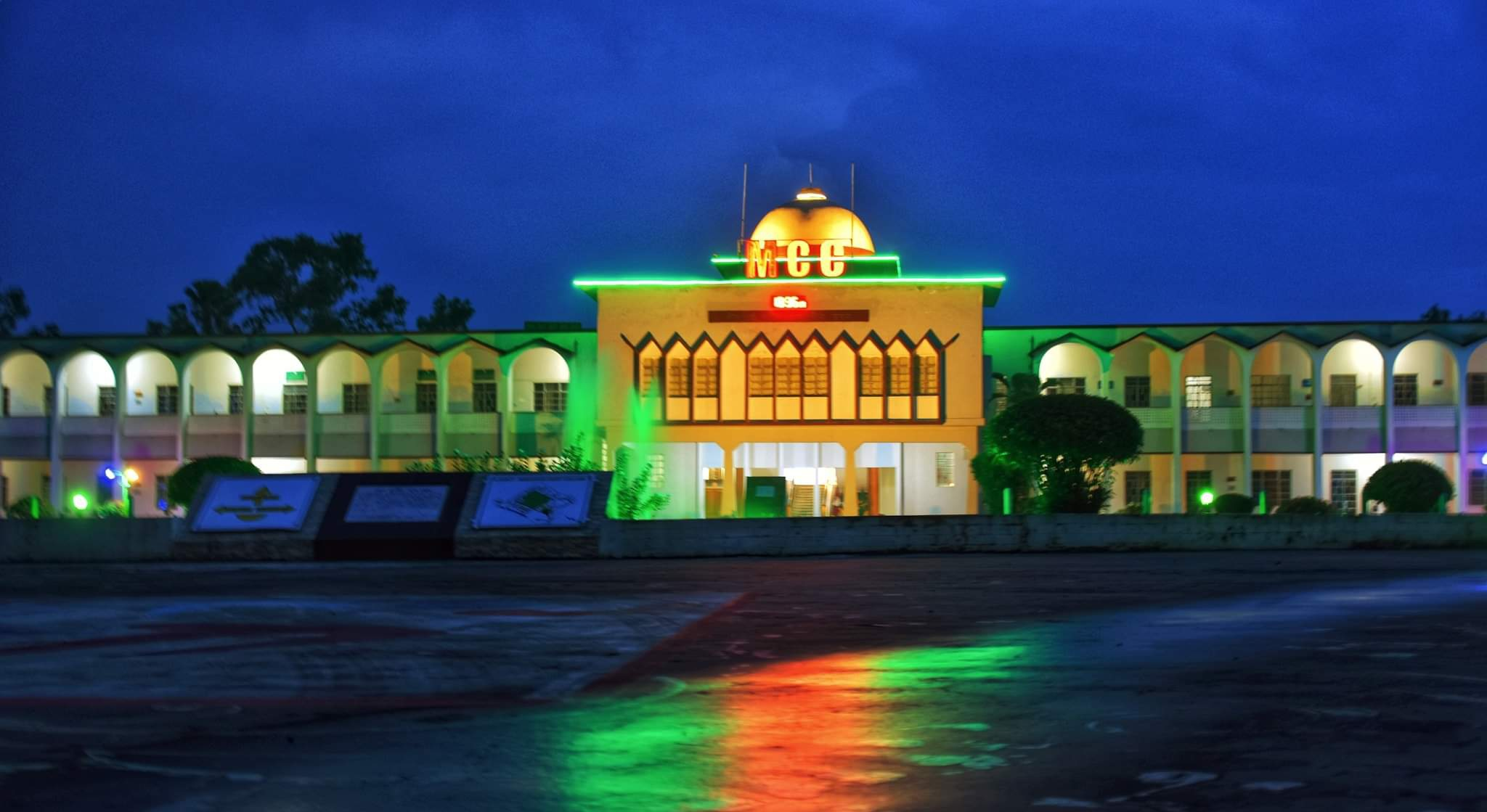
The Academic Building of Mirzapur Cadet College at Night.

The museum is situated just beside the Arts and crafts and Geography department. Some items are:

- Pictures of the historical events regarding MCC and the cadet colleges in Bangladesh.
- A map of the college.

The curator is Naina Akhter, Head of the Department of Arts and Crafts.

=== Dining hall ===
All cadets take their meals together in the dining hall. There are separate seating facilities for the prefects and the duty master generally known as the "High Table". Five meals are served every day. Dining hall prefect from class 12 nominatated by college authority lead the dining hall.

=== Houses ===
- MCC house flags.JPG The House flags
- Fazlul Huq House(Present champion house): Named after A. K. Fazlul Huq; Search, Struggle, Victory; Tiger; Blue; (achieved overall house Championship for record 32 times highest in the history of all cadet Colleges)
- Suhrawardy House: Named after Hussein Shaheed Suhrawardy; Vini Vidi Vici; Eagle; Red
- Nazrul House: Named after Kazi Nazrul Islam; Ever Erect is My Head; Lion; Green

When the academic activities of the college started on 9 January 1965, there were only two houses - Jinnah (now Fazlul Huq House) and Liaqat (now Suhrawardy House) for students' accommodation. Later Ayub House (now Nazrul House) was constructed to accommodate more students. Points are awarded to houses on the basis of different house competitions. At the end of the year house championship is determined depending on total house points.

- Fazlul Haque House: is the first house and initially named "Jinnah House". After the independence of Bangladesh, the current name was chosen. The motto of the house is Search, Struggle, Victory. The house color is blue and the symbol is a tiger. It is also called Tiger's' Den.
- Suhrawardy House: is the middle house, named after the leader of Bangladesh Hussein Shahid Suhrawardy. The house color is red. The motto of this house is "Vini Vidi Vici". Initially, the house was named "Liaqat House".
- Nazrul House: is the green house, named after the national poet of Bangladesh, Kazi Nazrul Islam. The house logo is lion and so the house is also called Lion Castle. The motto of this house is 'Ever Erect is my Head', a line of a poem of Kazi Nazrul Islam. Initially, the house was named "Ayub House".

=== Mosque ===
There is a central air conditioned mosque where all the cadets say their evening prayers. The cadets also says their Jumma prayer there.

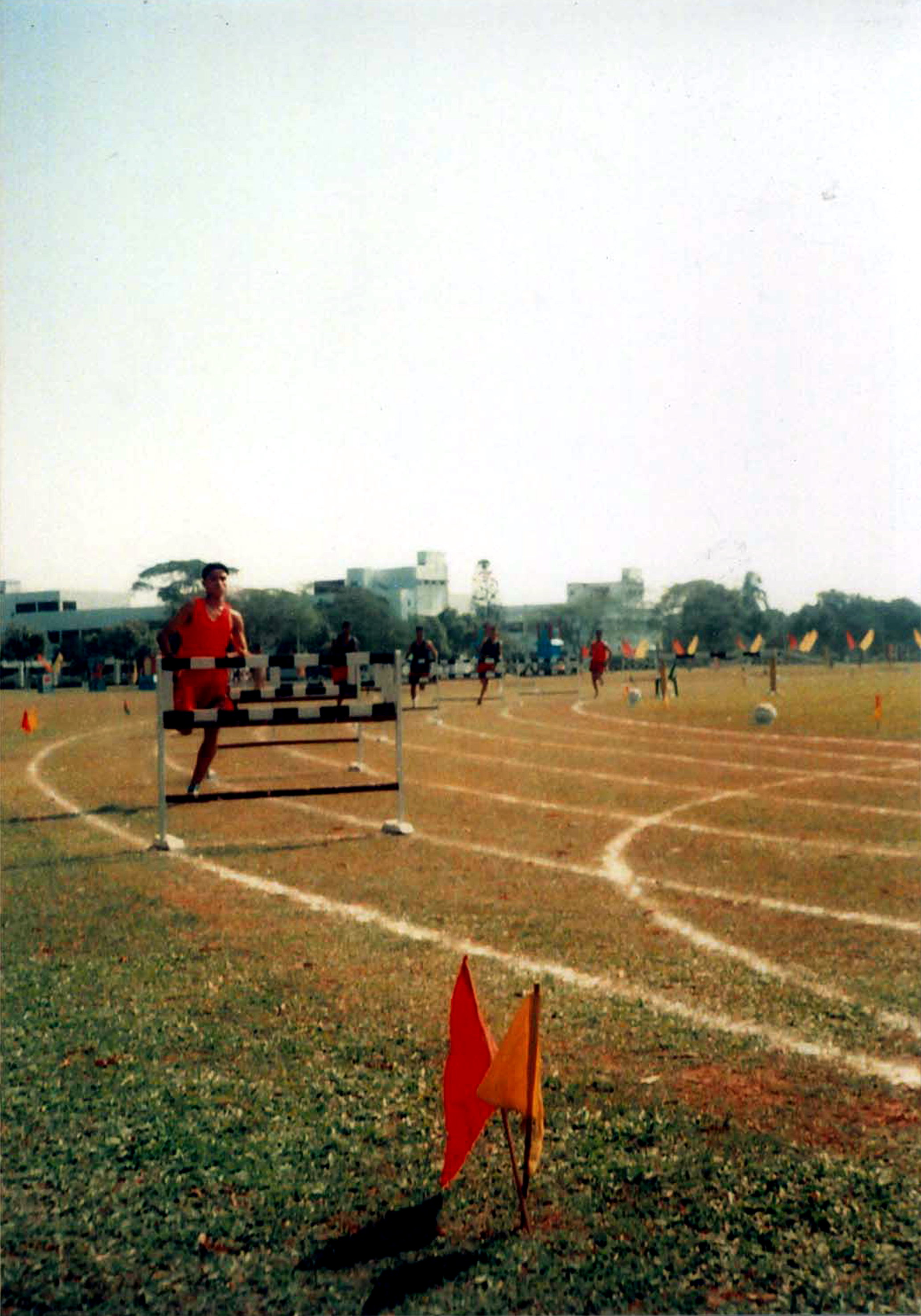
A cadet at 400m hurdles

=== Hospital ===
Mirzapur Cadet College has a hospital for cadets and for employees. A full-time doctor from the Army Medical Corps is appointed along with assistants. All the medicines are free of cost. The hospital is open 24 hours to accommodate any special needs.

Critical cases are directly referred to the Combined Military Hospital (CMH) in Saver Cantonment.

=== Designer ===
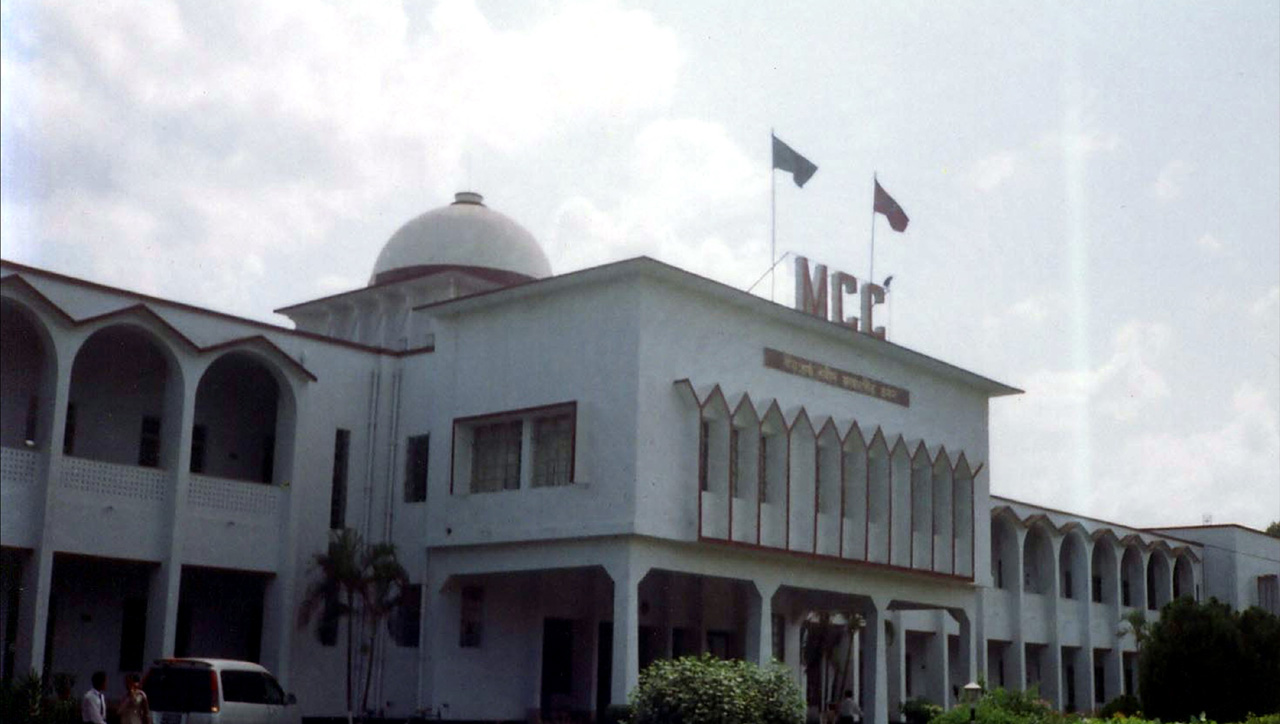
Mirzapur Cadet College Building

The MCC Campus was designed by the architect Mr. Thariani.

== Library ==
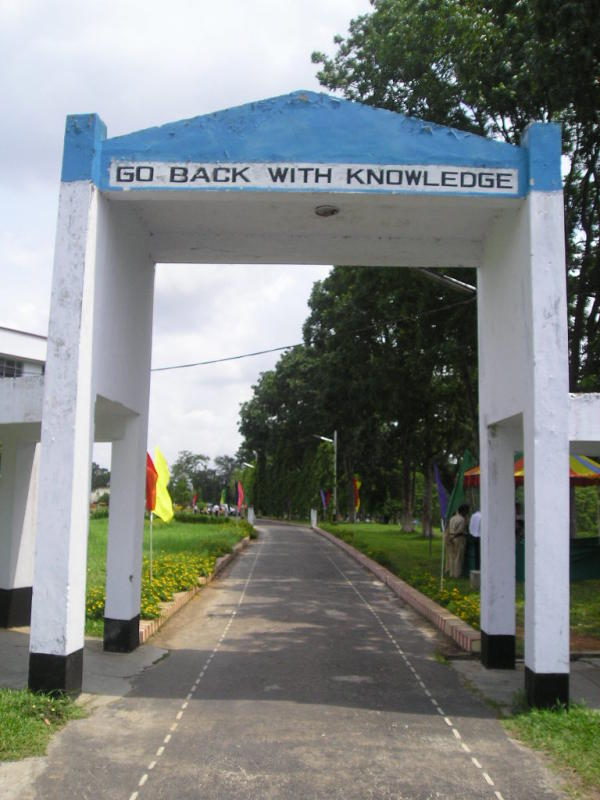
Gate of the house area

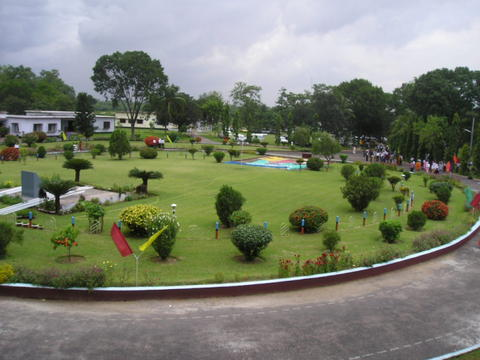
Circular ground in front of the academy building

The college library is named Shahid Khurshid Smriti Granthagar, after the martyr of the Independence War of Bangladesh who was a cadet of the college. There is a portrait of Khurshid Ali on the wall of the library.

The library has 18,000 books, and daily newspapers and weekly magazines are available.

== Clubs and societies ==
- Quranic Society: Cadets practice recitation of the Quran and are taught principles and significance of the verses revealed to Muhammad. They also study the lifestyle of Muhammad.
- Bangla Literary and Cultural Society: Members explore Bengali literature. They practice acting by playing characters portrayed by Bengali dramatists. Also poetry recitation, debate and extempore speeches are practiced.
- English Society: The society generates enthusiasm for English language and literature and further the cadet's ability to use English. Members practice recitation, elocution, public speaking and debate.
- Geography Society
- Hiking Club
- Photography Club
- Biology Club
- Natural Study Club
- Physics Club
- Chemistry Club
- Computer Club
- First Aid Club
- Wood Work Club
- Music Club: The members of this club practice and play instruments under the guidance of a music teacher. It includes practice on Tagore song, Nazrul song, Rural song, modern song, classical song and band song as well.
- General Knowledge and Current Affairs Club
- Arts and Crafts Club
- Robotics and Programming Club
- ROAR- Enlighten, Entertain, Encourage : ROAR is an independent public speaking platform organized on a monthly basis, by cadets

== First administration ==
- Principal: Mr. Michael William Pitt
- Adjutant: Captain Sayed Ali Ansar
- Doctor: Dr. Hafizul Hasan
- Vice Principal: Professor A Wahab
- Official activities began from: 7 January 1965

== Current administration ==
- Principal: Md Abul Kalam Azad
- Vice Principal: Mr. A T M Moazzem Hossain
- Adjutant: Major Abdullah Al Mamun
- Medical Officer: Major Md. Shahidul Islam, AMC
- OIC, Dining Hall: Nahida Sultana

== Notable alumni ==
- Lieutenant General Sina Ibn Jamali (retd), last served as Commandant of the National Defense College
- Major General (Retd.) Md Saiful Abedin
- Atiur Rahman, economist, former governor of Bangladesh Bank
- General Md Abdul Mubeen, Chief of Army Staff of the Bangladesh Army
- Ahmed Ataul Hakeem, 10th Comptroller and Auditor General of Bangladesh.
- Alamgir, pop singer
- Shahaduz Zaman, writer
