= Directorate General of Forces Intelligence =

Defence intelligence agency of the Bangladesh Armed Forces

- প্রতিরক্ষা গোয়েন্দা মহাপরিদপ্তর
- Insignia of DGFI

- Flag of DGFI

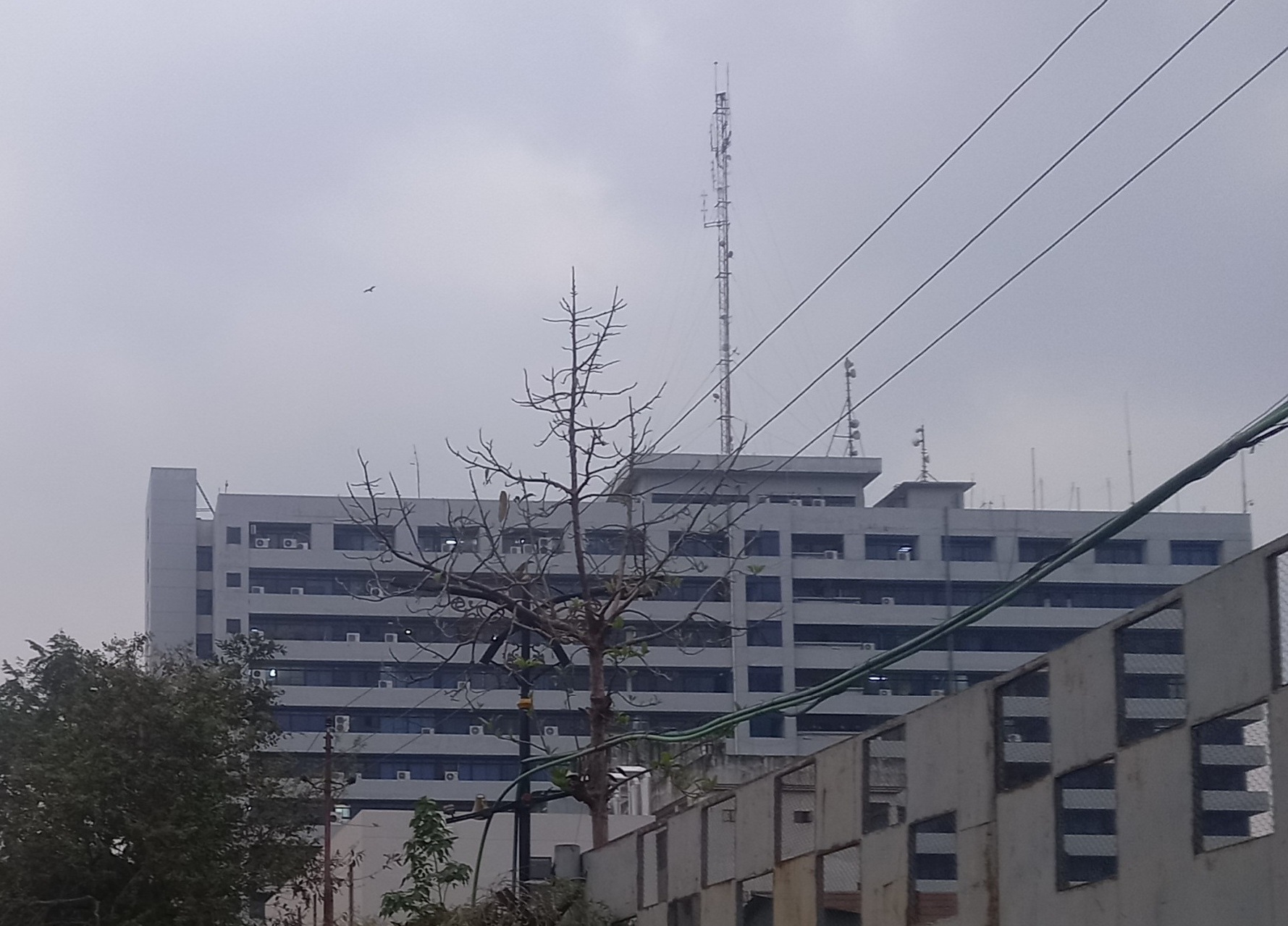
- DGFI HQ at Sadhinota Avenue

Agency overview
- Formed: 1972; 54 years ago
- Preceding agency: Directorate of Forces Intelligence
- Type: Military intelligence
- Headquarters: DGFI Building, Sadhinota Avenue, Dhaka Cantonment, Dhaka, Bangladesh; 23.79050249°N 90.38914060°E
- Motto: Watch and Listen for the nation, to protect national security
- Employees: Classified
- Annual budget: Classified
- Agency executive: Major General Mohammad Kaiser Rashid Chowdhury, Director General
- Parent department: Ministry of Defence
- Child agency: Counter Terrorism and Intelligence Bureau
- Website: http://dgfi.gov.bd (offline since 2018)

The Directorate General of Forces Intelligence (Note: Bengali: প্রতিরক্ষা গোয়েন্দা মহাপরিদপ্তর) known by acronym DGFI and also as The Black Hole, is the intelligence agency of the Bangladesh Armed Forces, responsible for the collection, collation, and evaluation of strategic and topographic information.

DGFI reports to its Director-General under the executive authority of the Prime Minister of Bangladesh. DGFI is focused on providing intelligence support to the Prime Minister, Cabinet, and Bangladesh Armed Forces.

== History ==
The DGFI was originally formed as Directorate of Forces Intelligence in 1972. A major impetus for the creation of the agency was to monitor unforeseen threats from neighboring and foreign armed forces. The agency experienced dramatic reorganization and growth after the 1977 unrest and attempted coup, resulting from the hijacking of JAL flight 472 from Bombay, India to Dhaka International Airport, Tejgaon. DFI was headquartered in Segunbagicha, Bailey Road, Dhaka. Upon its creation, Directorate of Forces Intelligence under the command and jurisdiction of the Ministry of Defence, it was organised as the principal intelligence arm of the nascent defense ministry of Bangladesh, limited to gathering critical information pertaining to the Armed Forces. The nascent DFI achieved very little and was overshadowed by National Security Intelligence.

In 1977, during reorganization of the DFI, it was transferred temporarily from the Minister of Defence to the Director of Martial Law Control Communication and Control Center under Wing commander Muhammad Hamidullah Khan. This objective was officiated under the control of the Chief Executive, the President. The directorate was elevated to Directorate General with major increase in budget and logistics, with its headquarters relocated to Dhaka Cantonment. The agency transformed into the principal intelligence arm of the defense forces specializing in gathering of foreign military intelligence.

The agency officially adopted its current name in 1977. The DGFI officially consists primarily of military officers from the three service branches of the Bangladesh Armed Forces, while with an evolving role in the country's intelligence community, DGFI is also reported to have classified civilian employees. The stated priority mission of the DGFI is to provide timely, and accurate intelligence, and tactical support to Bangladesh Armed Forces commands. While the budget of DGFI is classified, it is reported to have the largest budget of the intelligence agencies. The DGFI headquarters is located on Dhaka Cantonment.

The agency's counter-terrorism unit formed in 2006, CTIB, is responsible for gathering intelligence, infiltrating and neutralizing terrorist organizations that may pose a threat to national security.

In May 2014, current monogram of the DGFI was unveiled.

The DGFI has increasingly expanded its role throughout the years, including foreign intelligence gathering, counter-intelligence, covert operations, counter-proliferation, signals intelligence, cyber intelligence, and anti-terrorism.

== Structure ==
The DGFI is headed by a Director-General, traditionally a serving substantive Major General of the Bangladesh Army, typically holding the functional status of Lieutenant General within the organization’s hierarchy. Supporting the Director-General are one Deputy Director General (Two-Star status) and a number of senior officials holding the designation of Director (Brig Gen): specifically, nine Directors who report directly to the Director-General, each leading their respective functional wings as bureaus.

=== Director-General appointment process ===
The Director-General is appointed by the Government of Bangladesh. The selection is ordinarily made from a serving Major General of the Bangladesh Army, although appointments from other services have occasionally occurred. The process is carried out through coordination with Army Headquarters. Following the decision at the government level, the selected officer is formally notified and assumes office upon issuance of a gazette notification or an equivalent official announcement.

There is no fixed statutory tenure for the post. Duration of service is determined at the discretion of the appointing authority and typically aligns with broader patterns of military postings, promotions, and reshuffles. Historically, Directors-General have often served for periods of around two years, though longer terms have also occurred.

=== Bureaus and Detachments ===
The Directorate General of Forces Intelligence is organized hierarchically through bureaus and detachments. Its core directorates focus on strategic military intelligence—collection, analysis, and specialized threat mitigation—while specific internal structures are not publicly disclosed due to operational security considerations. Public estimates describe DGFI as comprising multiple subject- and territory-focused bureaus supported by field detachments, with a total workforce of approximately 12,000 personnel, drawn primarily from the Bangladesh Armed Forces.

As of 2025, reforms have been reported to reorient DGFI’s core directorates toward external threats by strengthening transborder surveillance and reducing internal political involvement, while maintaining its integrated military framework. Reporting lines are described as connecting to the Prime Minister’s Office and armed forces command structures to align intelligence priorities with national defense objectives.

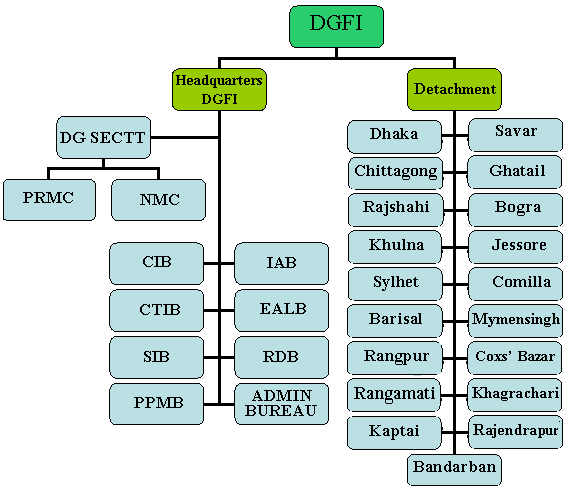
Branches of the DGFI that include detachments.

Bureaus in the DGFI, Headquaters
Bureaus	Abbreviation	Objectives
Counter-Intelligence Bureau	CIB	Tasked with countering anti-Bangladeshi intelligence by external threats
Counter Terrorism and Intelligence Bureau	CTIB	Elite covert intelligence unit of Directorate General of Forces Intelligence, tasked with resisting terrorism, gathering intelligence on internal or external threat to Bangladesh and counter-attack
Signals Intelligence Bureau	SIB	Monitors national telecommunication
Press and Public Media Bureau	PPMB	Monitors press/publications and media. Also acts as liaison to public
Internal Affairs Bureau	IAB	Monitors national political and strategic affairs
External Affairs and Liaison Bureau	EALB	Monitors international political and strategic affairs
Research and Development Bureau	RDB	Conducting research activities in relevant fields and advice it to the Director General
Administrative Bureau	ADMIN BUREAU	Ensuring the Logistics and administrative activities as well as human resources management within DGFI

Bureaus within the Directorate General, SECTT
Bureaus	Abbreviation	Objectives
Public Relations Monitoring Cell	PRMC	Monitoring the public news papers, electronic media and social media activities
National Monitoring Centre	NMC	It runs a 24/7 watchfloor to collect and correlate intelligence, issue real‑time alerts and briefings, task field units and coordinate responses, and log incidents with shift reports.

=== Counter Terrorism and Intelligence Bureau ===
Counter Terrorism and Intelligence Bureau, is an elite counter terrorism intelligence unit of DGFI. The Bureau was established in 2006 from the counterterrorism wing of DGFI which was established in 2002. The bureau was established along with the Rapid Action Battalion, and the counter terrorism cell of National Security Intelligence. CTIB is responsible for collecting and analysing intelligence on internal threats and counterattacks. CTIB agents are recruited from the Armed Forces and are responsible for gathering intelligence and executing special operations. In 2026 it has been renamed to Social Stabilization Intelligence Bureau (SSIB).

=== Bureau X ===
Bureau X is a DGFI-classified bureau responsible for foreign intelligence and espionage. As a unit of highly specialized operatives tasked with collecting intelligence on external threats, DGFI’s organizational structure and operational details are largely secret, so publicly available descriptions are limited and should be treated as unconfirmed. Around 2000, a new Bureau X was established to oversee these activities.

== Operations ==
The DGFI and its activities are highly classified and confidential to both the mass media and civilians. The functions and priorities of DGFI have changed throughout the years and vary with the country's political situations and foreign affairs. The primary function of the DGFI is the collection of foreign military intelligence, however during recent times, the agency has extended its role to economic, political and foreign intelligence. DGFI maintains active collaborations with very few other secret services around the world.

=== Chittagong Hill Tracts ===
DGFI has supported counterinsurgency operations in Chittagong Hill Tracts through intelligence monitoring and policy influence, including oversight of non-governmental organization activities perceived as potential security risks. Since the peace accord, DGFI has intervened in instances of suspected insurgent-linked training or advocacy, such as halting land management programs after reporting concerns to the Armed Forces Division, and ensuring presence during international fact-finding missions to safeguard operational sensitivities. These engagements align with broader military efforts under Operation Uttaran, initiated to address residual separatist activities.

=== India ===
On 17 December 1995, a Latvian-registered Antonov An-26 dropped a large consignment of weapons and ammunition over villages in Purulia district, West Bengal (including Jhalda, Ghatanga, Belamu and Maramu), reportedly comprising several hundred AK-47s and over one million rounds; several days later the aircraft re-entered Indian airspace and was intercepted. Investigations by Indian authorities and the Central Bureau of Investigation traced the shipment to Bulgarian suppliers and linked it to a front company, Border Technology and Innovations Ltd; the CBI submitted two end‑user certificates to the Calcutta High Court that were allegedly signed by Major General Shubid Ali Bhuiyan in his capacity as Principal Staff Officer of Armed Forces Division, and the recovered boxes were marked for Rajendrapur Cantonment in Bangladesh—certificates that Bangladeshi authorities and Bhuiyan deny, calling them forgeries. Several intelligence agencies investigated possible DGFI involvement, and the episode, regarded as a major peacetime security breach in India, prompted international cooperation and prolonged legal and diplomatic controversy.

A Bangladeshi DGFI agent concealed his nationality and joined R&AW where he was known as Diwan Chand Mallik. He was known to have obtained important intelligence which was damaging for India's national security. He joined the agency in 1999 and used to live in East Delhi. A case of cheating and forgery was filed against him at the Lodhi Colony police station on the basis of a complaint by a senior RAW official but no trace of him was found afterwards.

Over the years, DGFI has been accused several times of aiding Indian separatists from North-East and Kashmir. Indian government and Indian media have accused Bangladesh of involvement in the 2002 attack on American cultural centre in Kolkata. They have also blamed DGFI and ISI for designing coordinated attacks on Assam, Tripura and Bihar.

Indian leading newspaper; DNA, published a report in 2008 claiming the presence of around one hundred DGFI operatives in East India. The newspaper further claimed that the agency had set up groups across India consisting seven to ten people, each headed by DGFI's highly sophisticated Bureau X. According to intelligence branch of West Bengal Police, around fifteen Bureau X agents are active in West Bengal, each highly trained in handling sophisticated weapons and can effortlessly speak multiple languages and all the various dialects in the Indo-Bangladesh border districts.

According to Indian Intelligence analysis, "Operation Pin Code" was launched by DGFI in 2004. The operation was intended to extend DGFI influence over West Bengal and Assam state governments. Several sources claimed that by 2008, DGFI successfully gained 70% control over West Bengal assembly, however, no evidence were presented by Indian agencies.

=== Myanmar ===
DGFI's foreign-oriented operations have included cross-border initiatives amid the Rohingya refugee crisis. On January 19, 2025, DGFI personnel met Rohingya representatives from the Arakan Rohingya Salvation Army and Rohingya Solidarity Organisation in the 1W camp, Ukhia sub-district, Cox's Bazar, to launch guerrilla warfare training for selected fighters across Kutupalong camps. The program covered weapons use—drawing from arms captured by refugees from Myanmar junta forces in 2024—and intelligence collection, aimed at countering Arakan Army incursions. This directly preceded a joint ARSA and RSO assault on January 24, 2025, in Dell Fara, Myanmar, resulting in Arakan Army fatalities and injuries.

=== Nepal ===
Several Indian news outlets claimed to have found the trace of DGFI involvement in the 2008 Assam bombings. According to reports, The blueprint was created at a three-day conclave held at Dhulikhel, 30km north of Kathmandu, between 15 and 17 October. The sources said Colonel Ahmed Sufi of DGFI constructed a detailed blueprint for targeting northeastern Indian states. ISI was represented at the meeting by a lieutenant general-level official responsible for overseeing affairs in South Asia. The ISI official took a circuitous route from Pakistan to Dubai to Dhaka before reaching Kathmandu via Biman Bangladesh Airlines in order to avoid any suspicion by Indian security agencies, the sources revealed.

In 2014, DGFI tracked down Indian Mujahideen's top commander, Zia Ur Rehman in Nepal. The operation was executed after formal request from India's R&AW and Nepal's law enforcement agencies.

=== United Kingdom ===
United Kingdom's Home Secretary Jacqui Smith, several high-level MI5 and MI6 officials flew to Dhaka for meeting with senior officials of Directorate General of Forces Intelligence. She urged that DGFI investigate a number of British nationals whom the British security agencies found to be suspicious. As a result, A number of British suspects were taken to DGFI's secret interrogation centre, known as the Task Force for Interrogation cell. The British High Commission, Dhaka has rejected the allegations, stating that "our security cooperation with other countries is consistent with our laws and with our values". High Commissioner Stephen Evans acknowledged that British and Bangladeshi intelligence agencies cooperated in certain areas, which includes sharing of information which may be relevant to the security of either country.

== Controversies and criticism ==
In 2012, Former DGFI Deputy Director Tarique Ahmed Siddique was involved in bribery of 70 lakh Bangladeshi currency carried by a government vehicle. Border Guard Bangladesh confiscated the car later on.

DGFI was accused of blocking major companies from advertising in two major newspapers in Bangladesh; the daily Prothom Alo and the Daily Star, causing a loss of $2 million during the first month. Telenor, which owns a 55% stake in Grameenphone admitted that top-level officers from DGFI forced them to stop advertising in these two newspapers. However, other large corporations refused to comment on the issue. "We were informed by our clients that due to unavoidable circumstances, we should stop all advertisements in Prothom Alo and the Daily Star," Alam said. "We initially continued to advertise in the magazine supplements, but that was also stopped."

=== Role during the 1/11 government ===
The Fakhruddin Ahmed caretaker ministry was formed against the backdrop of the 2006–2008 Bangladeshi political crisis following a military-backed intervention nicknamed "1/11" led by General Moeen U. Ahmed and the resignation of President Iajuddin Ahmed as Chief Adviser. During this time, the DGFI became the country's main regulator, former army chief General Iqbal Karim Bhuiyan told the court. He made the statement while testifying before the International Crimes Tribunal in a case involving allegations of enforced disappearances and killings.

=== Mass surveillance ===
DGFI bought mass surveillance systems from Israel against civilians and critics, opposition activists and military personnel who were against Sheikh Hasina's regime. This mass surveillance system was used to track Hasina's opponents and detain them in the infamous torture centre which is known as Ayanaghar.

In 2020, an investigative report by Al Jazeera accused DGFI of purchasing Israeli-made mass surveillance equipment. The report claims of classified meeting between a team of DGFI officers and Mossad operatives in Hungary even though Bangladesh has no diplomatic relations with Israel and trade with Israel is prohibited. Bangladesh Army denied these allegations in an official statement.

=== Political Interference ===
The Directorate General of Forces Intelligence has been accused of engaging in political interference, primarily through its alleged role in suppressing opposition During Sheikh Hasina autocratic regime from 2009 to 2024. Critics, including human rights organizations and opposition figures, claim DGFI exceeded its military intelligence mandate by conducting domestic surveillance, carrying out abductions, and manipulating elections to bolster the ruling party’s grip on power.

These allegations intensified after Hasina’s ouster in August 2024. Investigations conducted by the interim government–led Commission of Inquiry on Enforced Disappearances reportedly documented DGFI’s involvement in over 3,500 reported cases, many targeting political dissidents such as Bangladesh Nationalist Party leaders and Islamist activists.

Chief Justice SK Sinha accused DGFI of forcing him to resign by threatening him of 'serious consequences' if he refuses to do so. In a controversial book "A Broken Dream: Rule of Law, Human Rights & Democracy", he describes DGFI treatment as so cruel that it could be compared with none other than the Gestapo force of Hitler.

A prominent instance involves the 2018 parliamentary elections. In July 2025, former Chief Election Commissioner K. M. Nurul Huda testified that DGFI, alongside the National Security Intelligence, exercised control over polling stations, facilitating widespread vote rigging to ensure Awami League victories in 96% of contested seats. Huda’s court admission highlighted the deployment of DGFI personnel to monitor and influence vote counts, amid reports of ballot stuffing and voter intimidation that international observers, including the European Union mission, said undermined electoral integrity. According to the testimony, these actions deviated from DGFI’s statutory focus on external threats and instead served partisan interests.

Further allegations claim enforced disappearances were used for political repression. In June 2025, a Commission of Inquiry reportedly found Sheikh Hasina “fully complicit” in DGFI operations, which critics allege involved the abduction of at least 100 opposition figures between 2010 and 2024. In October 2025, the International Crimes Tribunal sought arrest warrants for five former DGFI directors-general, including Major General Hasibuddin Ahmad (2019–2021), over alleged crimes against humanity tied to these disappearances.

Broader allegations include politicized promotions in the armed forces, with claims that DGFI surveillance was embedded within military ranks to prevent coups. After 2024, Human Rights Watch called for restricting DGFI to foreign intelligence, while the interim government attributes abuses to Hasina-era directives. DGFI’s supporters argue some operations addressed security threats, though independent verification is limited.

=== Human rights violations ===
In 2009, in the aftermath of Bangladesh Rifles revolt, security forces of Bangladesh detained more than 6,000 Bangladesh Rifles (BDR) members. At least 47 detained BDR members reportedly died in custody. DGFI was accused of torturing them to death. DGFI allegedly ran torture cells in many rooms of its headquarters building located in Kachukhet, Dhaka Cantonment.

The Guardian accused DGFI of torturing several British citizens in an unknown torture cell. Among the alleged victims, Jamil Rahman, a British national accused DGFI of repeatedly torturing him for over two years. He also accused British intelligence unit MI5 of working with DGFI. No evidences were found to support the allegations.

DW reported that Director General of Forces Intelligence operates illegal secret detention and torture cells in the capital city Dhaka, Bangladesh. The government of Bangladesh didn't publish the exact number of detainees. Still, the photograph revealed by the Voice of America and DW shows numerous solitary confinement cells in an unknown location in Dhaka. It was reported that detainees were from the Bangladesh Nationalist Party, and ordinary citizens who had criticised the Awami League-led government of Bangladesh. According to the report, areas near Dhaka Cantonment are one of many where detainees were kept blindfolded.

=== Enforced disappearance ===
On 5 August 2024, fifteen years after the July Uprising, Sheikh Hasina's autocratic regime collapsed and she fled to India. An investigation was launched against Hasina's regime for extrajudicial killings, abductions, and enforced disappearances by the Commission of Inquiry on Enforced Disappearances. They found that the DGFI was directly involved in these incidents, along with other agencies, and that Hasina's Defense Adviser and former Deputy Director General of DGFI, Tarique Ahmed Siddique, controlled the DGFI for Hasina autocratic regime own political gain and repression.

On 7 August 2024, the Directorate General of Forces Intelligence said it has no detainees at present in the Dhaka facility popularly known as “Aynaghar.” The statement was issued in response to ongoing reports and public concerns surrounding the site.

On 12 September 2024, Bangladesh's interim government sent three former directors and Generals, Lt Gen Saiful Alam, Lt Gen Ahmed Tabrez Shams Chowdhury, and Major Gen Hamidul Haque, into early retirement for their involvement in human rights violations.

On October 8, 2025, the International Crimes Tribunal formally accepted charges in two groundbreaking cases of crimes against humanity concerning the abduction, enforced disappearance, and torture of opposition figures during the lengthy rule of the Awami League. These alleged abuses reportedly took place in the Rapid Action Battalion's Task Force Interrogation cell and the Joint Interrogation Cell. The tribunal's actions mark a significant development in addressing these grave human rights violations, particularly involving five former directors general of the Directorate General of Forces Intelligence; Major General Tarique Ahmed Siddique, General Mohammad Akbar Hossain, General Saiful Abedin, Lt. Gen. Mohammad Saiful Alam and General Ahmed Tabrez Shams Chowdhury.

General Iqbal Karim Bhuiyan has demanded the immediate dismantling of the Directorate General of Forces Intelligence and Rapid Action Battalion, accusing these agencies of involvement in extrajudicial killings and enforced disappearances. He voiced his concerns while testifying for the second consecutive day before the International Crimes Tribunal-1, stating,

"I want RAB to be disbanded immediately. If that is not possible, the military personnel posted there should be returned to the armed forces." He further called for the disbandment of the DGFI, citing its loss of legitimacy due to fostering a culture associated with secret detention centers like the "Aynaghar."

Karim further claimed he had heard allegations that some victims were disposed of in rivers after being killed. He also stated that the DGFI picked up individuals—including ministers and political figures—and detained them in DGFI cells for interrogation between 2007 and 2008.

=== Arrest of high officials ===
After the July Uprising, numerous cases were filed against DGFI officials alleging murder, enforced disappearance, human rights violations, and breaches of the Anti-Terrorism Act. The Detective Branch of Dhaka Metropolitan Police detained Lt. Col. Afzal Naser, a former DGFI director and a key figure during the 2007–08 army-backed caretaker government. The Anti‑Corruption Commission seized Tk 2.42 crore from the residence of former DGFI Director Lt. Gen. Saiful Alam. A Dhaka court granted a four‑day fresh remand for former DGFI official Manjil Haider Chowdhury in a case filed under the Anti‑Terrorism Act, following an earlier case related to the killing of a businessman. Former DGFI chief Lt. Gen. Sheikh Mamun Khaled was jailed after multiple DB remands in the Delwar and Maqbul murder cases. After the final remand, a magistrate rejected his bail and ordered detention.

== See also ==
- Bangladesh Intelligence Community
- National Committee for Intelligence Coordination
- Prime Minister of Bangladesh
- Purulia arms drop case
- 10-Truck Arms and Ammunition Haul
