= Mirpur Cantonment =

Bangladesh military cantonment

Mirpur Cantonment
- Mirpur, Dhaka, Bangladesh

Site information
- Type: Cantonment
- Controlled by: Bangladesh Army

Mirpur Cantonment is a Bangladesh military cantonment located in Mirpur Thana, Dhaka. Mirpur DOHS is located beside the cantonment.

== Installation ==
- National Defence College
  - Armed Forces War College
- Defence Services Command and Staff College
- Station Headquarters, Mirpur (attached under Logistics Area)
  - Static Signals Company, Mirpur
  - OSP - 3
- 6th Independent Air Defence Brigade

== Education ==
The main education institutes in the Cantonment area are:

- Bangladesh University of Professionals
- Military Institute of Science and Technology (MIST)
- Mirpur Cantonment Public School and College (MCPSC)
