= Major general (Bangladesh) =

Rank in Bangladesh Army

Major general মেজর জেনারেল
- The insignia for the rank of major general is the Nymphaeaceae the Emblem of Bangladesh, above crossed sword and baton.

- Vehicle Star plate of major general
- Country: Bangladesh
- Service branch: Bangladesh Army
- Abbreviation: Maj Gen
- Rank group: Flag officer
- Rank: Two-star
- NATO rank code: OF-7
- Non-NATO rank: O-8
- Formation: 6 April 1972
- Next higher rank: Lieutenant General
- Next lower rank: Brigadier General
- Equivalent ranks: Rear Admiral (BN); Air vice marshal (BAF)

Major general (Note: Bengali: মেজর জেনারেল, romanized: Mejar jenarel, IPA: [ˈmedʒɔɾ ˈdʒenaɾel]) is a senior rank in the Bangladesh Army. It is the third-highest active rank of the Bangladesh Army and was created as a direct equivalent of the British military rank of major general.

== Details ==
Major general is a higher rank than Brigadier General, but lower than Lieutenant General. Major general is the equivalent of rear admiral in the Bangladesh Navy and air vice marshal in the Bangladesh Air Force. Mohammad Abdur Rab was the first person to hold this rank after independence. K M Shafiullah was the first person to became army chief while holding this rank.

== Insignia ==
The insignia for the rank of major general is the shapla (water lily) taken from the Bangladesh coat of arms, above a 'crossed sword and baton' since 2013. Until 2013, the insignia was used for 'lieutenant-general' rank and major general's insignia was only a pip over crossed sword and baton. Major generals wear two-star pointed badge in collars.

== Appointments ==
Major generals are the senior most operational officers of the army. Typically designated as area commander of one of eleven military areas who are also consigned as general officer commanding of the division, the area is commended over. As training commander, a major general is designated under ARTDOC as highest flag officer commanding of the infantry regiment and as commandant of Bangladesh Military Academy. They are also appointed as director generals under Ministry of Home Affairs, as ambassadors under Ministry of Foreign Affairs or as force commander under the United Nations. The senior most major general of a particular regiment may designated as the Colonel commandant of the regiment.

== See also ==
- Ranks of Bangladesh Army
- List of serving generals of the Bangladesh Army
- Awards and decorations of the Bangladesh Armed Forces
- General (Bangladesh)
- Lieutenant general (Bangladesh)
- Military ranks of Bangladesh
