= Lieutenant general (Bangladesh) =

Rank in the Bangladesh Army

Lieutenant general লেফটেন্যান্ট জেনারেল
- The insignia for the rank of lieutenant general is the Nymphaeaceae the Emblem of Bangladesh, above a pip and crossed sword and baton.

- Vehicle Star plate of lieutenant general
- Country: Bangladesh
- Service branch: Bangladesh Army
- Abbreviation: Lt Gen
- Rank group: General officer Flag officer
- Rank: Three-star
- NATO rank code: OF-8
- Non-NATO rank: O-9
- Next higher rank: General
- Next lower rank: Major General
- Equivalent ranks: Vice Admiral (BN); Air marshal (BAF)

Lieutenant general (Note: Bengali: লেফটেন্যান্ট জেনারেল, romanized: Lephṭenênṭ jenarel, IPA: [ˈlefʈeˌnænʈ ˈdʒenaɾel]) (Lt Gen) is a senior rank in the Bangladesh Army. It is the second-highest active rank of the Bangladesh Army and was created as a direct equivalent of the British military rank of lieutenant general. It is considered a three star rank.

== Details ==
Lieutenant general is a higher rank than Major General, but lower than General. lieutenant general is the equivalent of vice admiral in the Bangladesh Navy and air marshal in the Bangladesh Air Force. Until 2007 the lieutenant general was the highest rank of the army, usually designated as the chief of staff. Khwaja Wasiuddin and Ziaur Rahman were the first to hold this rank. Wasiuddin repatriated to Bangladesh Army from the Pakistan Army as lieutenant general on 1973 however, he later served as military ambassador under Ministry of Foreign Affairs. Rahman served as the first three star chief of army staff on 1975.

== Insignia ==
The insignia for the rank of lieutenant general is the shapla (water lily) taken from the Bangladesh coat of arms, above a pip and 'crossed sword and baton' since 2013; till 2013, the insignia was used for 'full general' rank and lieutenant-general's insignia was only shapla over crossed sword and baton. Lieutenant Generals wear three-star pointed badge in collars.

== See also ==
- Awards and decorations of the Bangladesh Armed Forces
- General (Bangladesh)
- List of serving generals of the Bangladesh Army
- Military ranks of Bangladesh
- Ranks of Bangladesh Army
