= Chowdhury Fazlul Bari =

Bangladeshi military personnel

- Military career
- Allegiance: Bangladesh
- Branch: Bangladesh Army
- Service years: 1981–2008
- Rank: Brigadier General
- Unit: East Bengal Regiment
- Commands: Director General of Directorate General of Forces Intelligence; Additional Director General (Operations) of Rapid Action Battalion; Commander of 46th Independent Infantry Brigade
- Police career
- Unit: Rapid Action Battalion
- Allegiance: Bangladesh
- Branch: Bangladesh Police
- Service years: 2004–2006
- Rank: Additional Director General

Chowdhury Fazlul Bari is a former Bangladesh Army officer and former director general of the Directorate General of Forces Intelligence.

== Career ==
Bari enrolled as a cadet of the 4th BMA Long Course in 1979 at the Bangladesh Military Academy. He was commissioned in 1981. Bari joined the elite Rapid Action Battalion (RAB) in 2004, when it was founded. As a colonel, he served as the director of RAB. The last post he held in RAB was additional director general at the rank of brigadier general. In 2005, he defended the Rapid Action Battalions practice of extrajudicial killing of suspects to the US embassy. He was made director of DGFI by the then BNP-led government. During the military-backed caretaker government headed by Fakhruddin Ahmed, he became the chief of DGFI. However, at the end of the caretaker government, he was posted to Bangladesh's diplomatic mission in Washington, D.C.

Tarique Rahman, son of former Prime Minister Khaleda Zia, accused Bari of leading the torture of him. He was recalled from his post after the elected Awami League government took power. He sought an extension, but the government did not grant it, and later the Bangladesh Army declared him an absconding without leave (AWOL) officer.

In 2009, Bari was declared a deserter. During the caretaker administration, he sought to aid the Bangladesh Freedom Party and the National Democratic Alliance. The Freedom Party was formed by the military officers who killed Sheikh Mujibur Rahman, the first president of Bangladesh, in a coup. He married Mehnaz Rashid, the eldest daughter of Lieutenant Colonel Khandaker Abdur Rashid, one of the killers of Sheikh Mujib and a leader of the Freedom Party. He divorced her in December 2008. He denied marrying her. In 2009, he applied for political asylum in the United States.

On 2 June 2025, in his interview with Bonik Barta, Bari stated that the 1/11 event in 2007 was orchestrated through a conspiracy involving civil society members, business elites, and foreign powers, with General Moeen Uddin Ahmed playing a central role. According to Bari, Moeen violated constitutional norms by engaging in political activities while serving as army chief, including pressuring political leaders and attempting to reshape Bangladesh's political landscape. Bari highlighted divisions within the army, noting that Moeen favoured a group of officers close to him while sidelining others, contributing to unrest and mistrust within the military ranks. According to Bari, the role of the army chiefs over the past 16 years, since the 1/11 political crisis, has been politically biased and supportive of the government. He points out that although Sheikh Hasina initially criticized General Moeen's appointment, she later worked closely with him. Subsequent army chiefs such as General Mohammad Abdul Mubeen, General Iqbal Karim Bhuiyan, General Aziz Ahmed, and SM Shafiuddin Ahmed all played roles in implementing the ruling party's authoritarian agenda. Specifically, Bari highlights General Iqbal Karim Bhuiyan's silent cooperation during the controversial 2014 election, accusing him of subordinating the army to political interests and enabling Sheikh Hasina's one-sided election plans. This boosted the ruling party's confidence, leading to voterless elections and human rights abuses in the following years. Bari questions where Bhuiyan was during the 1/11 crisis, especially since he now calls for preventing such events from happening again.
