= Anwar Hussain (general) =

Bangladeshi military personnel

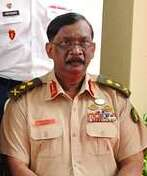
- Hussain in 2013

19th Director General of Border Guards Bangladesh
- In office 30 June 2011 – 5 December 2012
- President: Zillur Rahman
- Prime Minister: Sheikh Hasina
- Preceded by: Rafiqul Islam
- Succeeded by: Aziz Ahmed

Personal details
- Born: Narayanganj, East Pakistan, Pakistan
- Education: Defence Services Command and Staff College; National Defence College; Military Training Bangladesh Military Academy
- Awards: Independence Day Award

Military service
- Allegiance: Bangladesh
- Branch/service: Bangladesh Army; Border Guard Bangladesh
- Years of service: 1979–2018
- Rank: Lieutenant General
- Unit: Regiment of Artillery
- Commands: Quarter Master General at Army Headquarters; GOC of ARTDOC; Director General of Border Guards Bangladesh; GOC of 33rd Infantry Division; Commander of 9th Artillery Brigade; Commandant of Artillery Centre and School
- Battles/wars: UNOMIG; UNIIMOG

Anwar Hussain is a retired three star general and former quartermaster general of the Bangladesh Army. Hussain is also the former commander of the Border Guard Bangladesh, ARTDOC and the 7th colonel of the regiment of artillery.

== Education ==
He completed the Army Staff Course from Defence Services Command and Staff College, Mirpur in 1991, the Command and General Staff Course at Staff College Germany in 1992-93 and the National Defence Course from National Defence College, Mirpur in 2006.

== Career ==
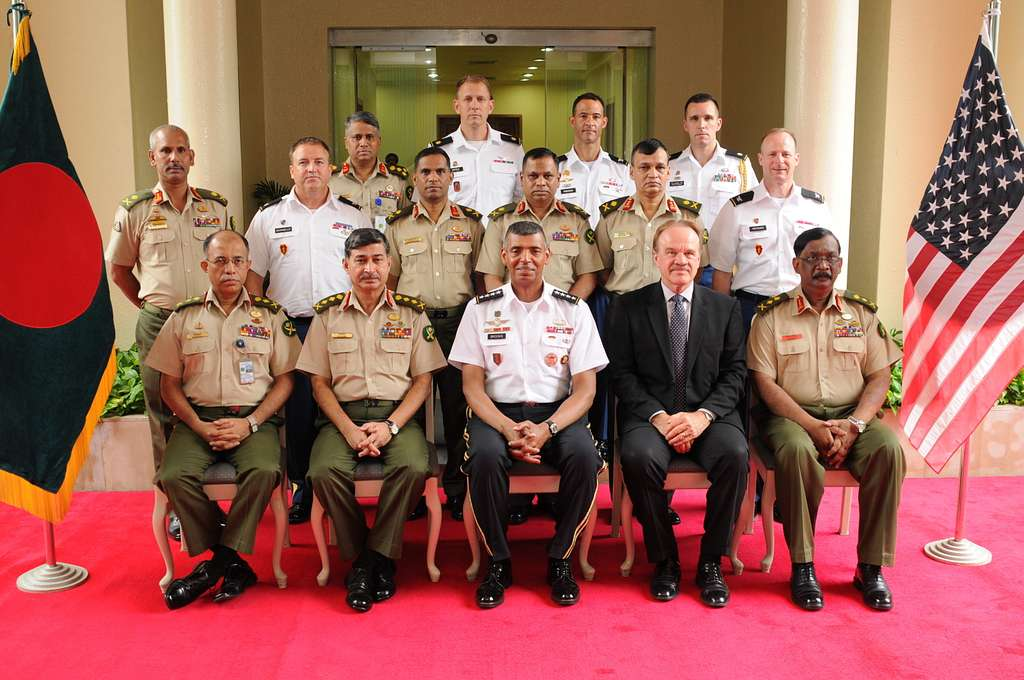
Hussain (far right) with General Iqbal Karim Bhuiyan and General Vincent K. Brooks of United States Army in 2013.

Hussain was commissioned in the Artillery Corps of Bangladesh Army on 23 December 1979 from the 1st BMA long course.

During his long tenure he served as commander of 9th Artillery Brigade, commandant of Artillery Centre and School (AC&S), director of a Directorate under General Staff Branch at Army Headquarters and GOC of 33 Infantry Division and area commander of Comilla Area. He served as general officer commanding of Army Training and Doctrine Command.

He served as director general of Border Guards Bangladesh from 30 June 2011 to 5 December 2012. During his tenure as BGB chief, the Coordinated Border Management Plan (CBMP) to reduce killings and crime along the common frontier and to further enhance the quality of border management was signed between BGB and BSF.

He was the vice chairman of the Bangladesh Diesel Plant Limited board of directors, an enterprise of Bangladesh Army. He also served as the vice chairman of the board of directors of Bangladesh Machine tools Factory Limited. He was the chairman of the board of directors of Canteen Stores Department (CSD). All DOHS and AHS comes under his authority as he was the quarter master general (QMG) of Bangladesh Army.

=== UN mission ===
In 1988-89 Anwar Hussain served as an observer of United Nations Iran-Iraq Military Observer Group (UNIIMOG) in 1988-89 and as chief military observer of UN Observer Mission in Georgia (UNOMIG) in 2008–09.
