= Haris Ahmed =

Bangladeshi gangster

- Born: 1966 (age 58–59); Dhaka, East Pakistan
- Other names: Mohammad Hasan (alias)
- Occupation: Businessman (under alias)
- Known for: Gang activity, fugitive status, alleged political connections
- Relatives: Aziz Ahmed (brother), Joseph Ahmed (brother)

Haris Ahmed (born 1966) is a Bangladeshi national and fugitive convicted of murder. He is known for his involvement in organised crime in Dhaka during the 1990s and his alleged connections to high-ranking political and military figures in Bangladesh. Ahmed fled the country in the early 2000s and later operated businesses in Europe under the false identity of "Mohammad Hasan".

== Early life ==
Haris Ahmed was born in 1966 in Dhaka, Bangladesh, into a large family with four brothers. His father was Abdul Wadud, and his mother was Renuja Begum. His father was an official of Biman Bangladesh Airlines. The family had five sons, Anis Ahmed, Aziz Ahmed, Sayed Hossain Tipu, Haris Ahmed, and Tofail Ahmed Joseph, and three daughters. His family was evicted from their home, purchased with a loan from the House Building and Finance Corporation, by a criminal gang.

Ahmed left school early and became involved in extortion and gang-related violence in the Mohammadpur. He was one of four brothers, along with Tofail Ahmed Joseph, Anis Ahmed, and Tipu Ahmed, who established a reputation as enforcers and protectors of political figures affiliated with the Awami League. He was a leader of the Jubo League, the youth wing of the Awami League.

== Career ==
In the 1980s and 1990s, the Ahmed brothers gained notoriety in Mohammadpur, extorting local businesses and aligning themselves with political figures. They reportedly served as unofficial security personnel for Sheikh Hasina, the daughter of Bangladesh's founding leader Sheikh Mujibur Rahman, during her early political career.

In 1996, Haris, along with his brothers Josef and Anis, was implicated in the murder of Mustafizur Rahman Mustafa, a leader of the Freedom Party, who testified from his deathbed. In 2004, Josef Ahmed was sentenced to death for the killing, while Haris and Anis received life imprisonment in absentia. Both Haris and Anis fled the country before the sentencing. Joseph received a presidential pardon in 2018 on the recommendation of Prime Minister Sheikh Hasina.

Haris assumed the identity of "Mohammad Hasan" using forged documents, including fake passports, birth and marriage certificates, and academic records. Under this alias, he relocated to Europe and operated several businesses, including illicit money exchanges and restaurants in Budapest, Hungary. He also invested in companies and properties in France and Malaysia, often using shell corporations such as "Bay of Bengal Kft" and "Snigdha". Ahmed's false identity allowed him to evade detection by authorities for years, despite being the subject of an Interpol Red Notice. In 2021, the Bangladesh Government pardoned Haris Ahmed and Anis Ahmed. Bangladesh Police dropped the Interpol notice on Haris. His name still appeared on the most wanted list of Bangladesh Police online.

Both Haris and his brother Joseph secured Bangladeshi passports under fake names. They had also acquired citizenship and a passport of Antigua and Barbuda. After the fall of the Sheikh Hasina-led Awami League government in August 2024, their national identity cards were cancelled by the Bangladesh Election Commission. Their passports were later cancelled. In September 2024, Salim Prodhan, the chairman of the Japan-Bangladesh Security Printing and Papers Company Limited, filed an extortion case against him and his brothers.

== Personal life ==
Haris Ahmed is the brother of Aziz Ahmed, the former Chief of Army Staff. According to covert recordings obtained by Al Jazeera's Investigative Unit, Haris and his brothers maintained close ties with Prime Minister Sheikh Hasina and senior military officials. The Bangladesh government dismissed the report as anti-Bangladesh propaganda.

In recordings, General Aziz is heard praising his brothers' loyalty and recounting how they protected Sheikh Hasina in her early political life. Haris himself boasted of using the elite Rapid Action Battalion to track rivals and extort money, describing the paramilitary group as "his gangsters". In 2019, Haris appeared publicly at his nephew's wedding in Dhaka, alongside his fugitive brother Anis and then-Army Chief Aziz Ahmed. Also in attendance were senior political figures, including the President of Bangladesh, Mohammad Abdul Hamid.

== See also ==
- Tofail Ahmed Joseph
- Aziz Ahmed
- Rapid Action Battalion
- All the Prime Minister's Men
