= All the Prime Minister's Men =

Documentary by Al Jazeera on corruption of Bangladesh Army Chief's family

- Youtube thumbnail
- Created by: Al Jazeera Investigates
- Narrated by: David Bergman, Tasneem Khalil, Sami (Pseudonym, real name: Zulkarnain Saer Khan)
- Original languages: Arabic; English; Bengali
- No. of series: 8th
- No. of episodes: 3rd

Production
- Production locations: Bangladesh, Malaysia and Hungary
- Running time: 60 minutes (en), 64 minutes (bn)
- Production company: Al Jazeera Media Network

Original release
- Network: Al Jazeera English
- Release: 1 February 2021

All the Prime Minister's Men is a 2021 Qatari English-language investigative documentary on Bangladesh published by the international media Al Jazeera, alleging corruption against powerful political and military figures in Bangladesh. The documentary focuses on the past and present activities of the former Chief of Army Staff of the Bangladesh Army General Aziz Ahmed's family members and alleges various forms of corruption.

== Description ==
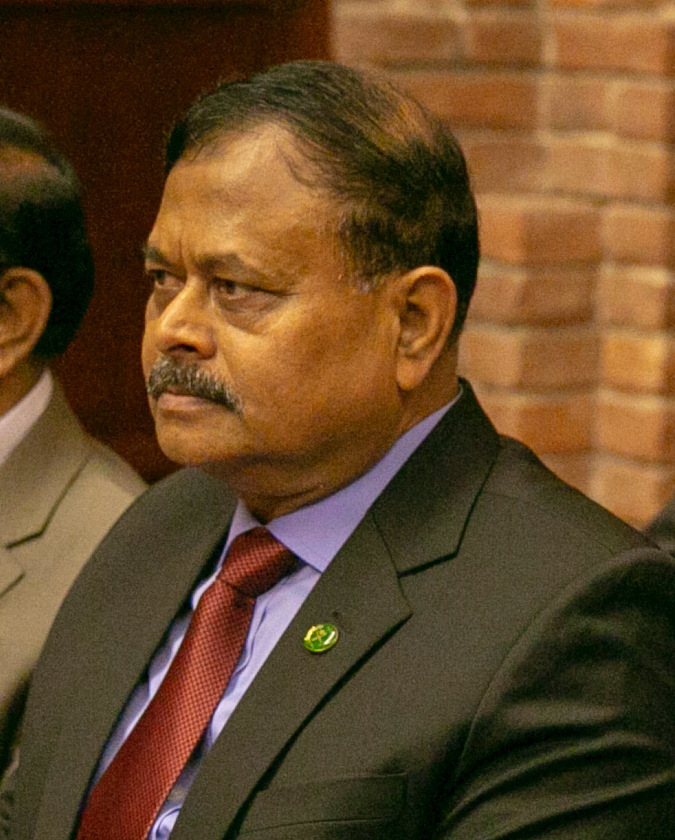
Aziz Ahmed

The documentary follows General Aziz Ahmed (who served as Chief of Staff of the Bangladesh Army from June 2018 till June 2021) and his three brothers' activities. Aziz's three brothers were convicted in 2004 of a murder. Among the brothers, Anis Ahmed and Haris Ahmed are currently on the run. A third brother, Tofail Ahmed Joseph, was released from prison with a presidential pardon.

Although the two brothers are on the run, the documentary shows marrying Aziz Ahmed's son in Bangladesh. Here Anis Ahmed is shown in Kuala Lumpur, Malaysia and Haris Ahmed in Hungary's capital Budapest.

Harris Ahmed's business activities in Budapest were investigated through secret recordings. He changed his name to Hasan Mohammad and set up several businesses in different countries. In a conversation with a Bangladeshi businessman in Budapest, he is seen talking about supplying bullets to the Bangladesh Army. He also mentioned that up to Tk 5 crore was taken to get the job of Police with the connivance of the top people of the government.

According to the report, Aziz directly helped Sheikh Hasina in the 2014's and 2018's elections by the agreement of a secret mutual contract.

In a trapped secret interview by Al Jazeera, Haris said that, the chief of police Benazir Ahmed do everything according to their command.

The documents also showed that security forces imported Internet and mobile phone surveillance technology from Israel. However, Haris Ahmed was not contacted for comment.

In other video recordings, Azis's brother Haris boasts of profits he made from military contracts using his brother's power as army chief to extract bribes. The documentary also provided photographic evidence that in March 2019, Haris and Anis visited Dhaka for the wedding of Aziz's son, where the two fugitives partied alongside Bangladesh President Mohammad Abdul Hamid and foreign dignitaries during an opulent ceremony.

Zulkarnain Saer Khan — referred to as "Sami" in the film is the whistleblower central to Al Jazeera's investigative documentary, "All the Prime Ministers Men". Khan was part of Al Jazeera's investigation that unearthed links between the prime minister and criminal gangs.

== Bangladeshi government response ==
The documentary has been alleged to be defamatory by the Ministry of Foreign Affairs and Army Headquarters.

In a statement, the foreign ministry said,

The Bangladesh government is rejecting this 'reckless propaganda' of some extremists and their associates who are doing this from London and other places. It is disappointing that Al Jazeera is being used as a tool to implement a nefarious political plan aimed at ousting a secular democratic government where the government's role in Bangladesh's remarkable socio-economic development has been proven.

—

In a statement, the army headquarter of Bangladesh said,

These selfish individuals with dishonest and corrupt character are already engaged in anti-Bangladesh activities by establishing links among themselves. It is not undesirable or incomprehensible for these individuals to deviate from mainstream journalism and engage in evil thinking with an international news outlet like Al Jazeera. This report has been prepared by cleverly editing and attaching audio clips and photographs of various official, social and personal activities of the country's top military officials.

—

== Awards ==
Al Jazeera won the top prize for "Best Human Rights Journalism" (investigation category) in the 8th annual Amnesty Media award for the documentary in 2022. Al Jazeera's Investigative Journalism Unit has won the Best Long Investigative and Best Audio prizes at the DIG for its Investigative, All the Prime Minister's Men in 2021.

== Reaction and aftermath ==
After the documentary published, Counter Terrorism & Transnational Crime (CTTC) has submitted charge sheet before a Dhaka court against expatriate Zulkarnain Saer Khan alias Sami and six others in a case filed under Digital Security Act (DSA). In March 2023 Mahinur Ahmed Khan, alleges he was beaten with iron rods by four men in the Shewrapara, Mirpur, Dhaka. Mahinur's brother, Zulkarnain Saer Khan, was one of the journalists who worked with Al Jazeera's Investigative Unit (I-Unit) on All the Prime Minister's Men US embassy in Dhaka spokesperson Bryan Schiller in a statement, expects a thorough investigation into a reported attack on Mahinur Ahmed Khan.
