= Abu Belal Muhammad Shafiul Haque =

Former (15th) Army Chief of Bangladesh

Abu Belal Muhammad Shafiul Haque OSP
- আবু বেলাল মোহম্মদ শফিউল হক
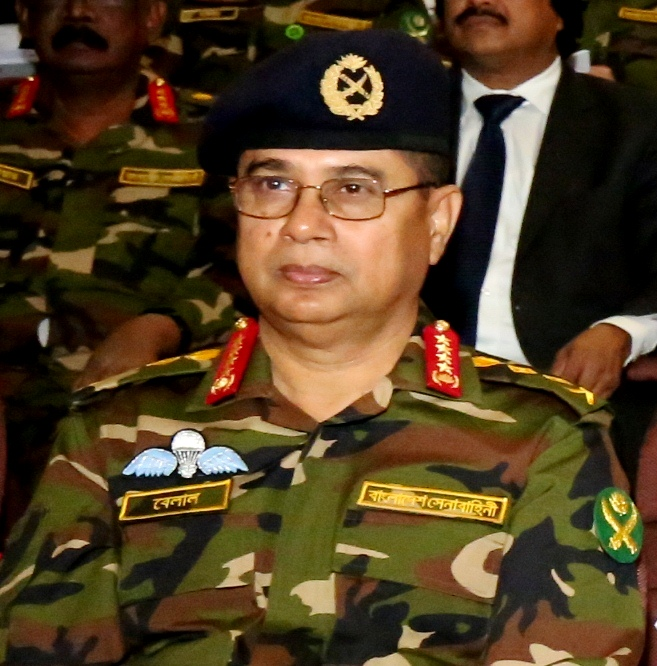
- Belal in 2017

15th Chief of Army Staff
- In office 25 June 2015 – 25 June 2018
- President: Abdul Hamid
- Prime Minister: Sheikh Hasina
- Preceded by: Iqbal Karim Bhuiyan
- Succeeded by: Aziz Ahmed

Principal Staff Officer of Armed Forces Division
- In office 1 January 2013 – 24 June 2015
- President: Zillur Rahman; Abdul Hamid
- Prime Minister: Sheikh Hasina
- Preceded by: Abdul Wadud
- Succeeded by: Mainul Islam

Personal details
- Born: 1 December 1958 (age 67) Sonapur, Noakhali, East Pakistan, Pakistan
- Relations: Annisul Haque (brother)
- Education: Bangladesh Military Academy; National University, Bangladesh; Bangladesh University of Professionals; United States Army Command and General Staff College
- Awards: Sword of Honour (BMA); Oshamanno Sheba Padak (OSP); Independence Day Award

Military service
- Allegiance: Bangladesh
- Branch/service: Bangladesh Army
- Years of service: 1978 – 2018
- Rank: General
- Unit: Armoured Corps
- Commands: Commander of 93rd Armoured Brigade; Commander of 309th Infantry Brigade; Commander of 222nd Infantry Brigade; GOC of 33rd Infantry Division; GOC of 19th Infantry Division; Commandant of Defence Services Command and Staff College; Principal Staff Officer of Armed Forces Division; 16th Chief of Army Staff
- Battles/wars: UNIIMOG; UNMEE

Abu Belal Muhammad Shafiul Haque (Note: Bengali: আবু বেলাল মোহম্মদ শফিউল হক) (Note: OSP, ndc, psc) (born 1 December 1958) is a retired four star general of the Bangladesh Army. He was the chief of army staff of the Bangladesh Army from 25 June 2015 to 25 June 2018. Before becoming the army head, he served as the principal staff officer of Prime Minister's Office of the Armed Forces Division. He has also served as an aide-de-camp to the President of Bangladesh. He was commissioned into the armoured corps of the Bangladesh Army from 6th SSC (Short Service Commission) course in June 1978.

== Early life ==
Abu Belal Muhammad Shafiul Haque was born on 1 December 1958 to a Bengali Muslim family in the village of Sonapur in Sonagazi, Feni, then part of the Noakhali district of East Pakistan. His father, Sharif Haque, was an official belonging to the Bangladesh Ansar. He passed Secondary School Certificate (SSC) from Dinajpur Zilla School. He obtained his Bachelor of Arts degree from Dhaka University, master's degree in defense studies from National University Bangladesh, and master's degree in philosophy from Bangladesh University of Professionals. His brother Annisul Huq was elected Mayor of Dhaka North City Corporation in April 2015.

== Military career ==
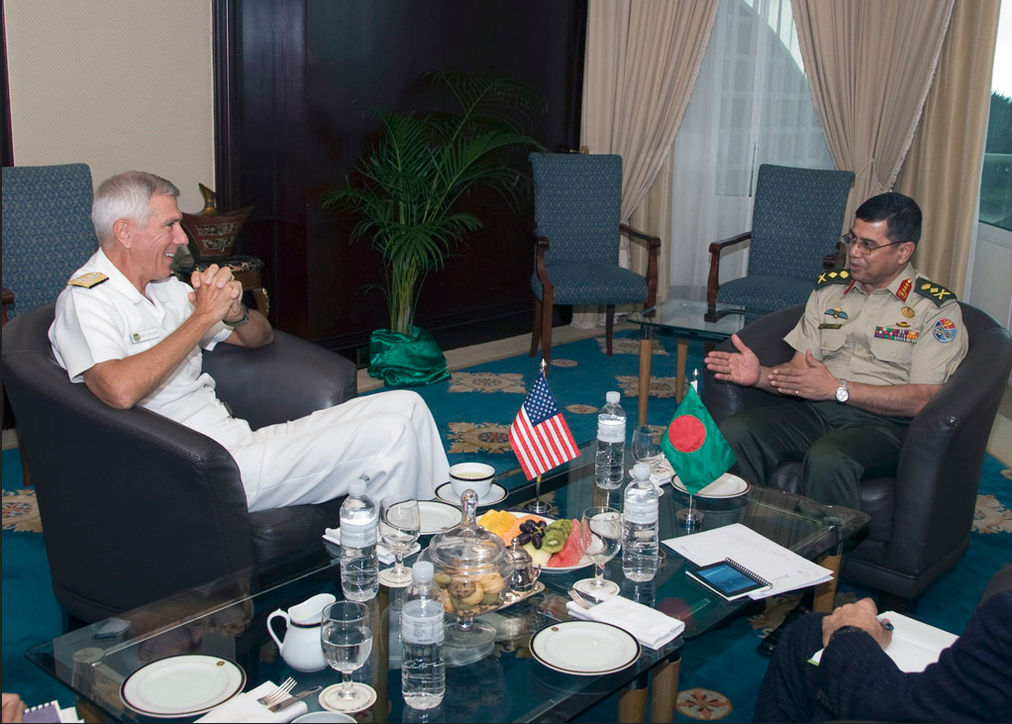
Then Principal Staff Officer Lieutenant General Belal in forum with U.S. Pacific Commander, Admiral Samuel J. Locklear.

Belal joined Bangladesh Military Academy on 22 July 1977. After completion of training, he was commissioned in Bengal Lancers on 18 June 1978 in the 6th SSC (Short Service Commission) course. He was adjudged as the best all-round cadet of his batch and was awarded Sword of Honor (an award given to the best meritorious cadet in Bangladeshi military forces).

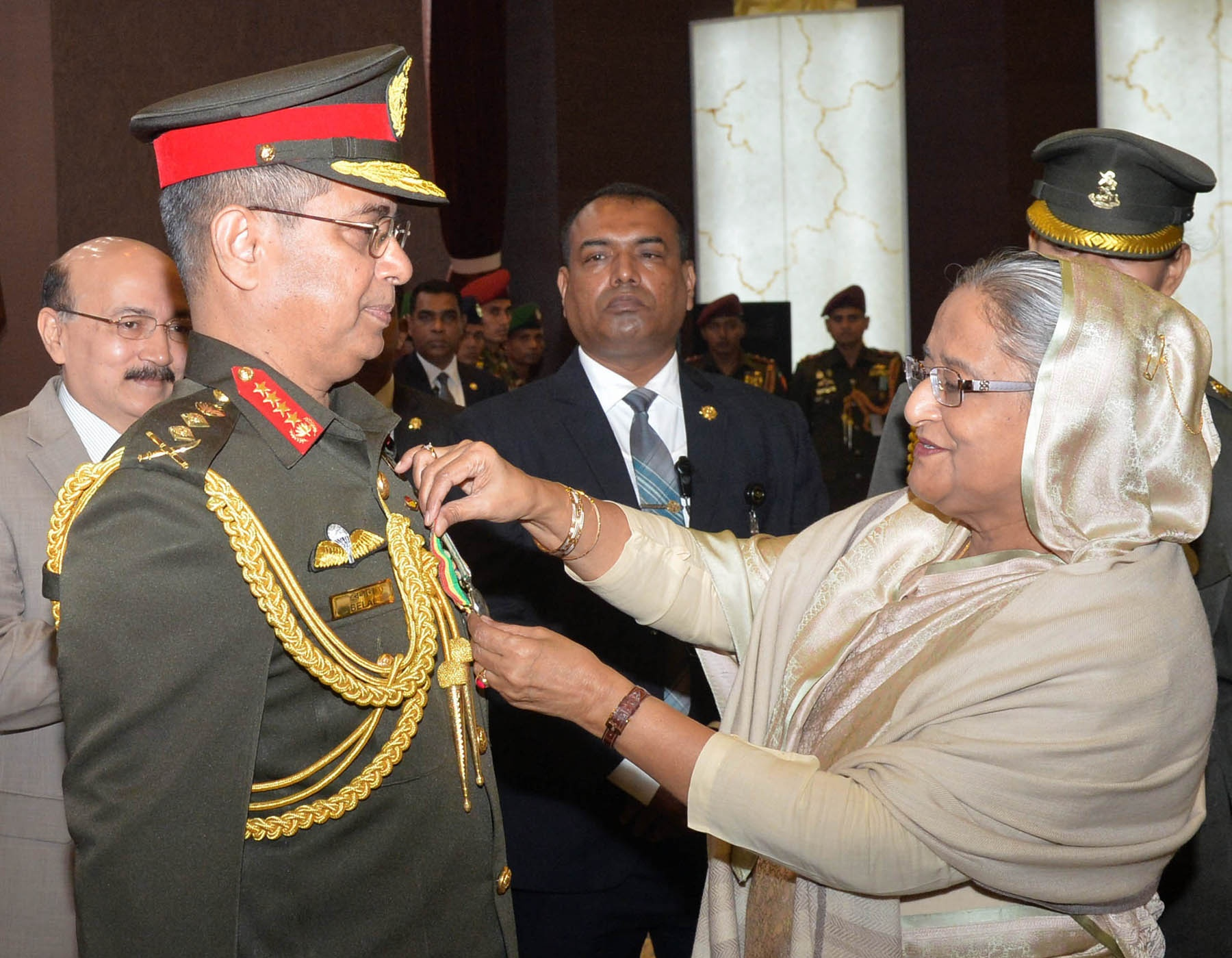
Prime minister Sheikh Hasina awarding the batch of Oshammano Sheha Padak (OSP) to General Belal on 2016

In a distinguished career spanning 40 years, Belal has held a variety of command, staff and instructional appointments. As a staff, he served as the aide-de-camp (ADC) to the president of Bangladesh, brigade major (BM) of an infantry brigade and colonel staff of an infantry division. He commanded two tank units, three brigades (one armored and two infantry) and two divisions (19th and 33rd). He also served as Military Secretary and adjutant general of the army.

=== UN missions ===
From 1988 to 1989, Belal served as a military observer with the United Nations Iran-Iraq Military Observer Group (UNIIMOG). He was appointed deputy force commander and chief military observer of UNMEE on 4 January 2007.

=== Army Chief (2015-2018) ===
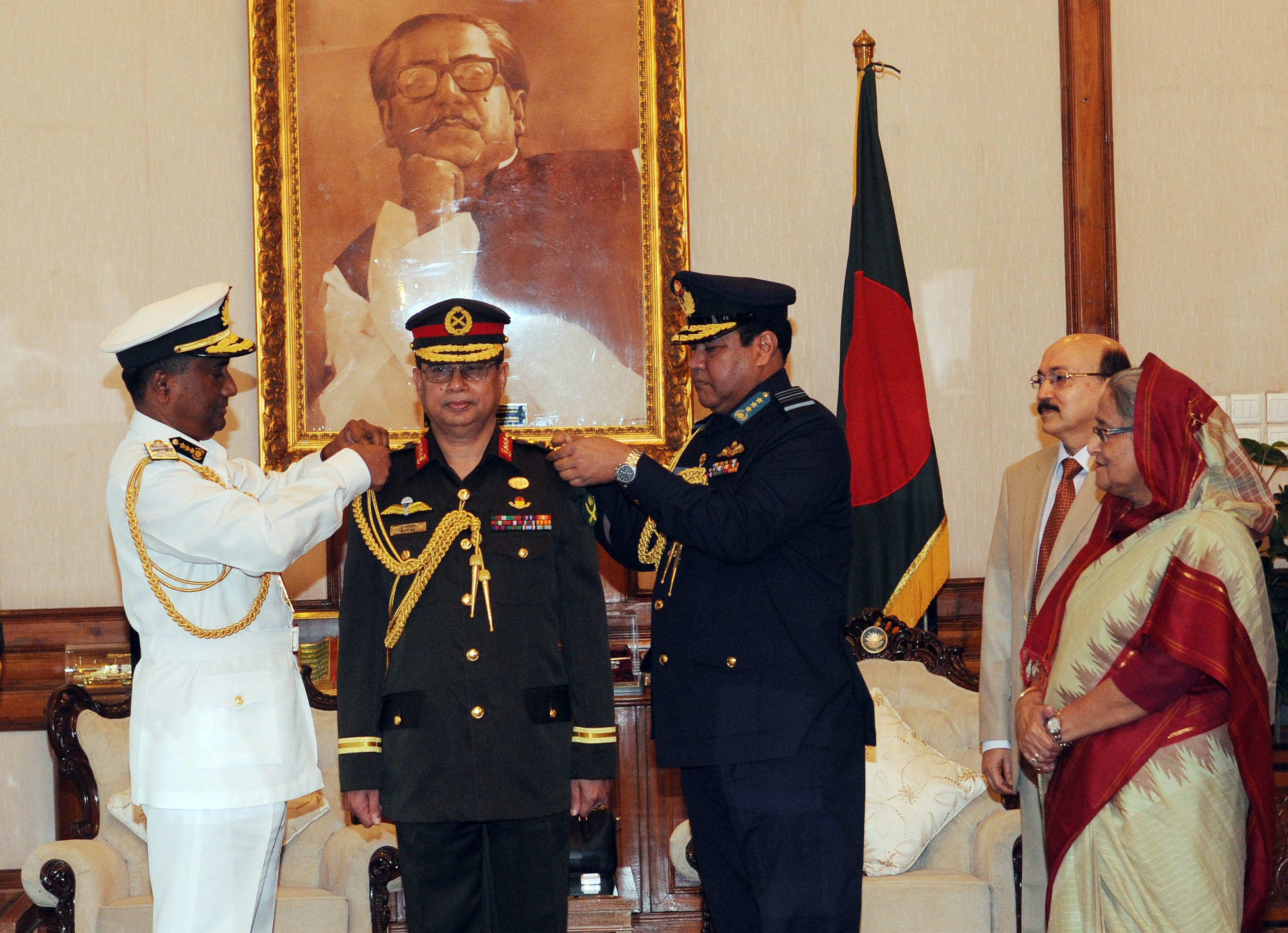
Belal adorning the rank of General at Prime Minister's Office in 2015

In June 2015, he was made the new army chief, taking over from General Iqbal Karim Bhuiyan. As army chief, he sought to increase defence cooperation with Saudi Arabia and other Middle-Eastern states. He also called on the Nepali President Bidya Devi Bhandari as part of a five-day visit to enhance cooperation between Bangladesh and Nepal.

In his farewell call to PM Hasina, she expressed her appreciation to General Belal for discharging his duties successfully during his tenure. Afterwards, he was succeeded by General Aziz Ahmed.

== Personal life ==
Belal is married to Shoma Haque. They have 2 children. Anisul Haque, the first mayor of Dhaka North City Corporation is his elder brother. His father Shariful Haque was the former director of Bangladesh Ansar and took retirement in 1982.

== Retirement ==
He retired from the army with effect from 25 June 2018.

== Honours ==

Uttoron Padak Medal	Independence Day Award Medal	Cyclone Relief of 1991 Medal	1991 National Election Medal
1996 National Election Medal	2001 National Election Medal	Silver Jubilee Medal	27 years service
20 years service	10 years service	UNIIMOG Medal	UNMEE Medal

Military offices
Preceded by Iqbal Karim Bhuiyan	Chief of Army Staff; 25 June 2015 – 25 June 2018	Succeeded by Aziz Ahmed
Preceded by Abdul Wadud	Principal Staff Officer of the Armed Forces Division; 1 January 2013 – 24 June 2015	Succeeded by Md Mainul Islam
