= Fazle Elahi Akbar =

Bangladeshi general

- ফজলে এলাহী আকবর
- Born: 6 November 1952 (age 73); Dacca, East Pakistan, Pakistan
- Military career
- Allegiance: Bangladesh
- Branch: Bangladesh Army
- Service years: 1971–2006
- Rank: Major General
- Unit: East Bengal Regiment
- Commands: Commander of 46th Independent Infantry Brigade; Commander of 101st Infantry Brigade; GOC of 19th Infantry Division; Commandant of Defence Services Command and Staff College; GOC of 11th Infantry Division
- Conflicts: UNIIMOG; UNMIS

Fazle Elahi Akbar (born 6 November 1952) is a former major general of the Bangladesh Army who served as military adviser to the UN Advance Mission in the Sudan (UNAMIS). He served as the force commander in UNMIS from 2004 to 2006.

== Career ==
=== Bangladesh Army ===
Akbar was commissioned into the infantry (East Bengal Regiment) in 1971. He was part of Bangladesh's first UN peacekeeping mission. In 1988, the army selected 15 top officers to serve as observers during the Iran-Iraq War as part of the United Nations Iran–Iraq Military Observer Group (UNIIMOG) from 1988 to 1989. He was a lieutenant colonel then. From 2004 to 2006, he served as the force commander of the United Nations Mission in Sudan (UNMIS), the first force commander from Bangladesh. He also served as director of military operations.

=== After military ===
Akbar is a director of Social Islami Bank Limited. He retired from the Bangladesh Army in 2006 following a lobbying effort against him by General Moeen U Ahmed. On 21 October 2008, he joined as the security affairs adviser to Begum Khaleda Zia, former prime minister of Bangladesh, a position he still holds to date.

He is the chairman of "Foundation for Strategic and Development Studies", or FSDS, a think tank that carries out research on the state's good governance, national security, development, and policy making.
