= Aziz Ahmed (general) =

16th Army Chief of Bangladesh

Aziz Ahmed SBP, BSP
- আজিজ আহমেদ
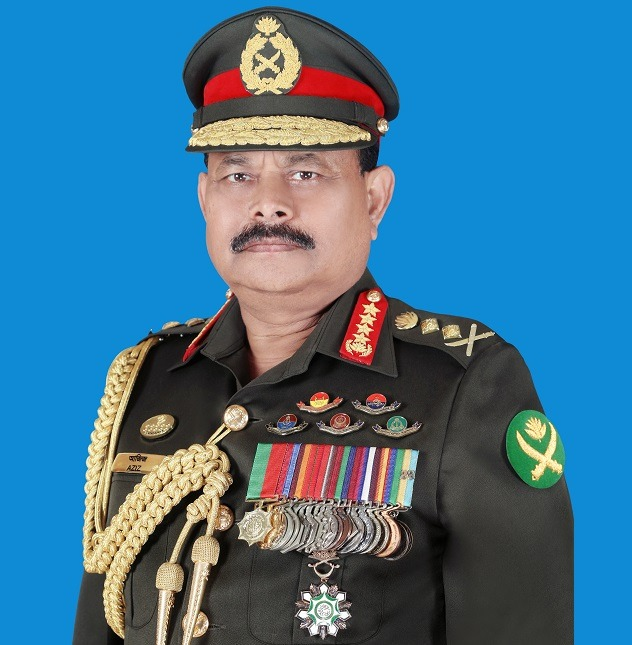
- Official portrait as Chief of Army Staff

16th Chief of Army Staff
- In office 25 June 2018 – 24 June 2021
- President: Abdul Hamid
- Prime Minister: Sheikh Hasina
- Preceded by: Belal Shafiul Haque
- Succeeded by: S. M. Shafiuddin Ahmed

20th Director General of Border Guard Bangladesh
- In office 5 December 2012 – 1 November 2016
- Prime Minister: Sheikh Hasina
- Preceded by: Anwar Hussain
- Succeeded by: Abul Hossain

Personal details
- Born: 1 January 1961 (age 65) Narayanganj, East Pakistan, Pakistan
- Education: Bangladesh Military Academy; University of Chittagong; National University; American International University-Bangladesh; Bangladesh University of Professionals
- Awards: Senabahini Padak (SBP); Bishishto Seba Padak (BSP); Independence Day Award

Military service
- Allegiance: Bangladesh
- Branch/service: Bangladesh Army; Border Guard Bangladesh
- Years of service: 1983 – 2021
- Rank: General
- Unit: Regiment of Artillery
- Commands: Quartermaster general at Army Headquarters; GOC of ARTDOC; Director General of Border Guard Bangladesh; GOC of 33rd Infantry Division; Commander of 33rd Artillery Brigade; Commander of 6th Independent Air Defence Artillery Brigade; Sector Commander of Bangladesh Rifles
- Battles/wars: UNIKOM; UNMIS

Aziz Ahmed (Note: Bengali: আজিজ আহমেদ) (Note: SBP, BSP, BGBM, PBGM, BGBMS, psc, G, PhD) (born 1 January 1961) is a retired Bangladeshi four star general who was the chief of army staff of the Bangladesh Army from 25 June 2018 to 24 June 2021.

== Early life and education ==
Aziz was born on 1 January 1961 in Narayanganj. His ancestral home is in the village of Tarki in Sultanabad Union at Matlab Uttar Upazila of Chandpur District. He is the third child of Abdul Wadud, who was a retired Master warrant officer of Bangladesh Air Force and senior ground manager of Biman Bangladesh Airlines in his later career, and Renuja Begum who was a homemaker. He completed his secondary school from Mohammadpur Government High School in 1977 and high school from Notre Dame College. He also attained the engineering seminar in Textile Technology from Bangladesh University of Textiles in 1980. And in 1983, he obtained his Bachelor of Science from Chittagong University. Aziz enlisted to Bangladesh Military Academy on 7 August 1981 in 8th BMA long course, and was commissioned in the 2nd field artillery regiment on 10 June 1983. He is a graduate of Defence Services Command and Staff College and furthermore completed his three master's degrees, in defence studies (MDS), in Master of Science at Technical engineering from National University and also Masters in Business Administration at Executive from American International University-Bangladesh. He earned his PhD degree on Border Management Challenges of Border Guard Bangladesh (BGB): Issues in Transnational Threat from Bangladesh University of Professionals under supervision of Nazmul Ahsan Kalimullah.

== Military career ==
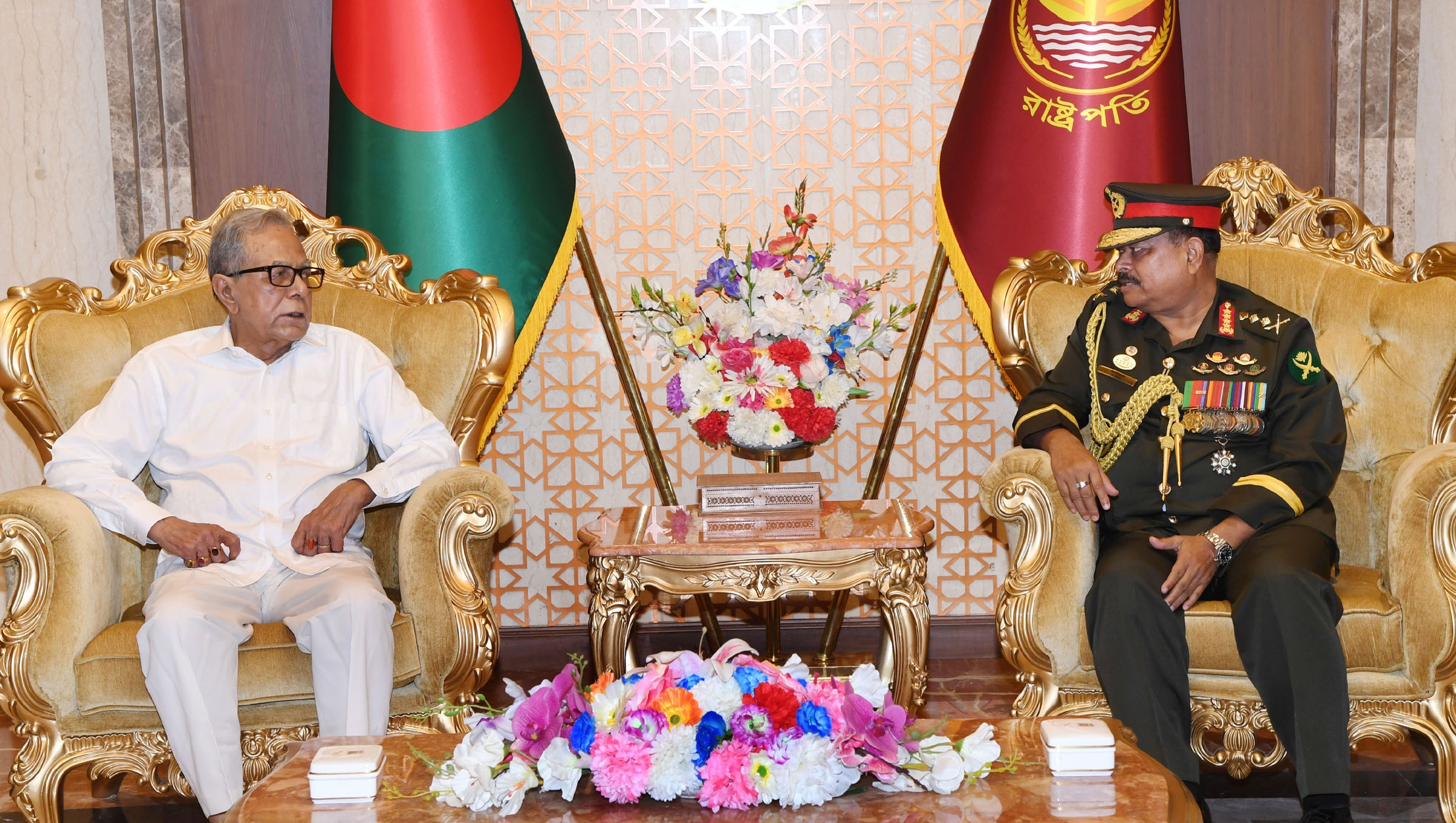
Ahmed in his farewell visit to President Abdul Hamid in 2021.

Aziz served during Chittagong Hill Tracts insurgency as an artillery troop leader, gun position officer, and furthermore general staff officer (operations) in 69th Infantry Brigade at Bandarban Cantonment. Aziz attended the Junior Command Course in Army War College, Mhow in his initial career days. He served as a brigade major in an infantry brigade and a general staff officer at the military training directorate and the pay pension & allowance directorate of army headquarters. He also served as instructor for more than seven years until 2008 at the Artillery Center & School and the School of Military Intelligence.

Aziz commanded one artillery battery, one artillery regiment and was one of the pioneer officers of Border Guard Bangladesh at the unforeseen emergence of Bangladesh Rifles revolt, where he commanded one rifles battalion in 2009 and then a BDR Sector in 2010. Aziz returned to army for brief moment in which he was ameliorated to brigadier general and commanded two artillery brigades including the sole Independent air defence artillery brigade.

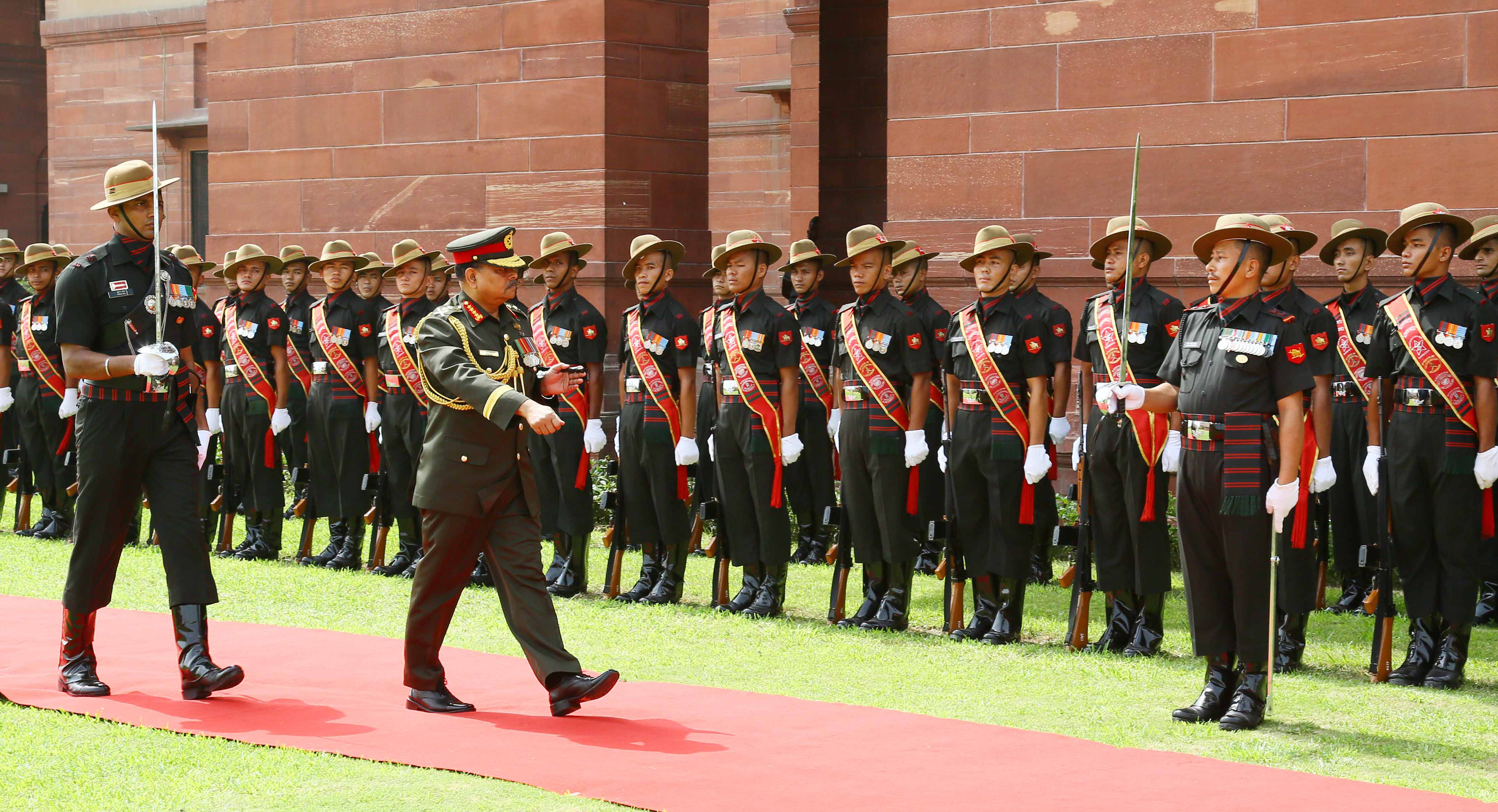
Aziz inspecting an Indian Guard of honour in 2019

Aziz was soon ameliorated to major general and commanded the 33rd infantry division in Comilla. He then returned to Border Guard Bangladesh and appointed as director general on 5 December 2012. Under his command, Aziz cited that border guard raised four regional headquarters, 15 battalions and established 108 new border outposts covering 310 kilometres (190 mi) unguarded border with India and Myanmar along the border in Chittagong Hill Tracts area, and furthermore two floating outposts in the Sundarbans. During his tenure, a total of 18,000 new soldiers were recruited, including the first 100 female recruits for border guard. Aziz played a prominent role in normalizing the border guard force after the Bangladesh Rifles revolt. He reinstated credence on the newly formed border guard forces and took initiative to launch of Shimanto Bank a welfare project for the betterment of Border Guard Bangladesh.

n 16 November 2016, Aziz was promoted to lieutenant general and appointed general officer commanding of ARTDOC. On 9 January 2018, Aziz was re-assigned to army headquarters as quarter master general of the army.

=== United Nations peacekeeping missions ===
Aziz also served as an observer for the United Nations Iraq-Kuwait Observation Mission (UNIKOM) and a military adviser to the force commander of the United Nations Mission in Sudan (UNMIS).

=== As Chief of Army Staff ===
On 25 June 2018, Aziz was promoted to the rank of general and was appointed as the 16th chief of army staff replacing general Abu Belal Muhammad Shafiul Huq. As army chief Aziz was critical during superseding five senior generals including Sheikh Mamun Khaled and Mahfuzur Rahman.

During his tenure, the army witnessed important reforms that includes participation in 54 United Nations peacekeeping missions in 40 countries and furthermore facilitation the signing of a non-binding agreement with the Kingdom of Saudi Arabia for military cooperation and support that includes the deployment of Bangladeshi troops in Saudi Arabia.

He retired from the army on 24 June 2021 succeeded by general Shafiuddin Ahmed as chief of army staff.

== Personal life ==
Aziz is married to Begum Dilshad Nahar Aziz and the couple has three sons. His second son is serving as an officer at Bangladesh Army. Aziz had 5 brothers including younger brother Tofail Ahmed Joseph, a convicted criminal. In 2017, media reported that Joseph had spent 20 months in hospital, allegedly without any medical reason, and in privileged conditions. He was transported back to the jail from hospital when the issue was raised. He was given a presidential pardon on 30 May 2018, in order to undergo medical treatment in India. Two other brothers, Harris Ahmed (or Haris) and Anis Ahmed, were also named as accomplices in the murder of Mostafa, and a fourth sibling, Sayeed Ahmed Tipu, was shot dead by assailants in the 1990s.

== Corruption accusations ==
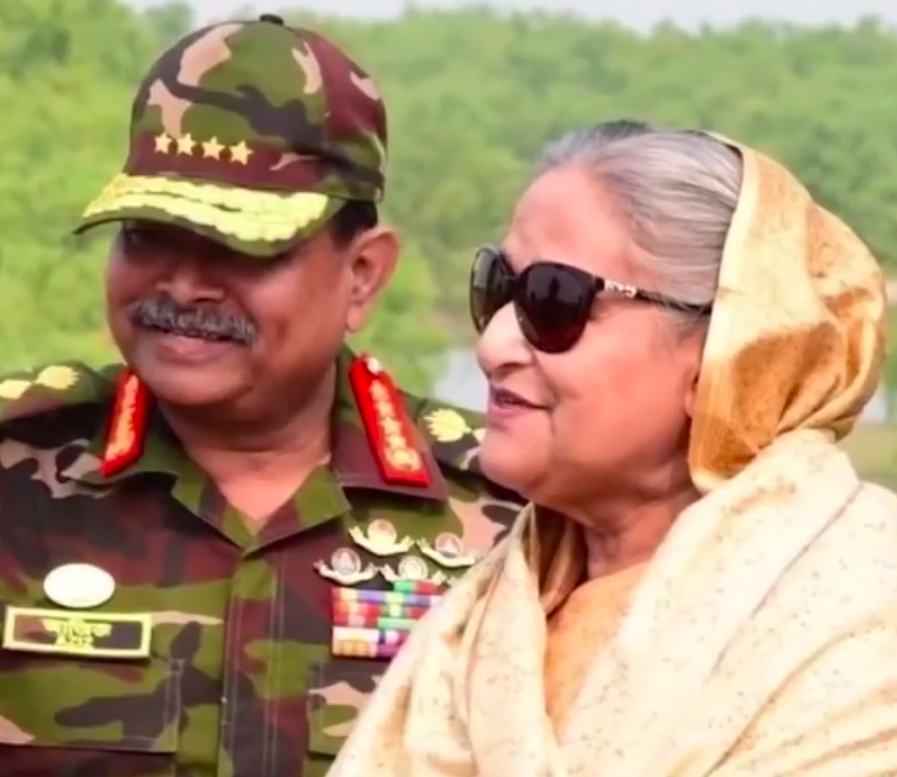
General Aziz at a military parade with Sheikh Hasina

On 1 February 2021, Qatar-based Al Jazeera broadcast a one-hour long investigative documentary by David Bergman, son-in-law of prominent Bangladeshi politician Kamal Hossain and Journalist Zulkarnain Saer Khan titled All the Prime Minister's Men, which revealed how Ahmed protected his brothers, Haris and Anis Ahmed, after they fled abroad to escape law enforcement despite them both being currently wanted by Bangladeshi law enforcement. In addition, leaked documents obtained by Al Jazeera revealed how Aziz used officers to help Haris create a false identity, which was then used to set up businesses in Europe and buy properties around the world.

In other video recordings, Aziz's brother Haris boasts of profits he made from military contracts using his brother's power as army chief to extract bribes. The documentary also provided photographic evidence that in March 2019, Harris and Anis visited Dhaka for the wedding of Aziz's son, where the two fugitives partied alongside Bangladeshi President Abdul Hamid and foreign dignitaries during an opulent ceremony. The documentary has been publicly denounced by the Bangladesh government, and the Foreign Ministry of Bangladesh has hinted at taking legal steps against Al Jazeera on this accord. Bangladesh Army Headquarters condemned Al Jazeera report and told it was false, abusive, politically motivated to disrupt the harmony among different government organs of the country. UN Secretary-General's spokesman comments on the report in response to a question and said, it should be investigated by the relevant authorities. In an audio recording broadcast by Al Jazeera, Ahmed admitted to gain financially for being Chief of Army Staff, and wants to use that money to travel overseas and enjoy lavish life. Ahmed had offered the military's contract and better position for police forces in return for monetary gains from the lucrative contract.

The Guardian reported that Ahmed instigated voter suppression in the 2014 general election in Bangladesh. Prime Minister Sheikh Hasina has maintained a peculiar relationship with Ahmed. Hasina's party won the election landslide due to Border Guard deployment in the countries, and the use of the Border Guard to torture and discourage opposition voters from entering the polling stations. In return, in 2018, Hasina promoted Ahmed as the Chief of Army Staff. Human Rights Watch reported a long pattern of extrajudicial killings, disappearances, and torture by the Bangladesh Army under Ahmed's control. New information suggests the Bangladesh military is in the government's abusive surveillance tactics at home by an Israeli-made surveillance system procured under the command of Ahmed. On 20 May 2024, United States Department of State imposed sanctions on Aziz and immediate family members for significant corruption in Bangladesh, barring them from entering the United States.
