= Chowdhury Mohammad Azizul Haque Hazary =

Bangladesh Army major general

Azizul Haque Hazary OSP(BAR), SGP
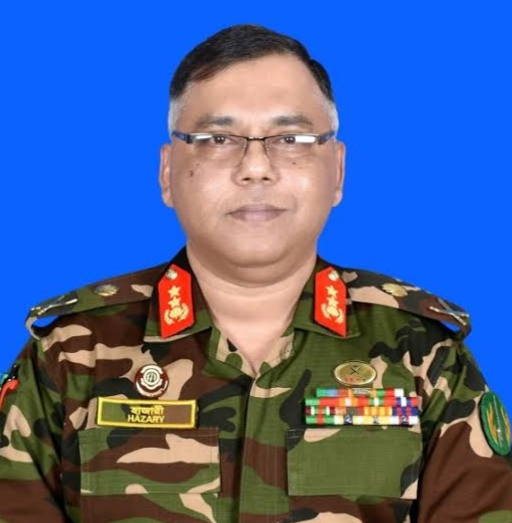
- Born: 11 June 1970 (age 56); Dacca, East Pakistan, Pakistan
- Education: Bangladesh Military Academy
- Military career
- Allegiance: Bangladesh
- Branch: Bangladesh Army
- Service years: 1990–2026
- Rank: Major General
- Nickname: Hazary
- Unit: East Bengal Regiment
- Commands: Commandant of Defence Services Command and Staff College; GOC of 17th Infantry Division; Commandant of School of Infantry and Tactics; Commander of 69th Infantry Brigade; Commander of 16th Infantry Brigade; Sector Commander of MONUSCO
- Conflicts: UNIKOM; UNMIL; MONUSCO
- Awards: Sword of Honour (BMA); Sena Gourab Padak(SGP); Oshamanno Sheba Padak(OSP)

Chowdhury Mohammad Azizul Haque Hazary is a retired major general of Bangladesh Army whose last appointment was commandant, Defence Services Command and Staff College. Earlier, he was the general officer commanding (GOC) of 17th Infantry Division and area commander, Sylhet Area.

== Career ==
In 2019, Hazary served as sector commander of the northern sector of UN peacekeeping force in Democratic Republic of the Congo (MONUSCO). Before that, he served as the region commander of Bandarban region.

Hazary was commissioned with 22 BMA Long Course in June 1990 and he won the Sword of Honor for all round best performance in his course. He was promoted to major general and made the commandant of the School of Infantry and Tactics in December 2020. Prior to join SI&T, General Hazary was serving at ARTDOC. On 12 November 2022, he was posted to 17th Infantry Division as general officer commanding (GOC) and area commander Sylhet Area.
