= Tofail Ahmed Joseph =

Bangladeshi gangster

- Born: Dhaka, East Pakistan
- Occupation: Former gangster
- Known for: Conviction for murder; alleged ties to ruling Awami League
- Relatives: Aziz Ahmed (brother), Haris Ahmed (brother)

Tofail Ahmed Joseph is a Bangladeshi national and a former convicted killer with a history of organised crime activity. He is one of the Ahmed brothers, a group of siblings known for their involvement in gang violence in Dhaka during the 1980s and 1990s. Joseph was convicted and sentenced to death for murder in 2004, but later received a presidential pardon and was released from prison in 2018. His close familial ties to former Bangladesh Army chief Aziz Ahmed have drawn significant public attention and criticism.

== Early life ==
Joseph's father was Abdul Wadud, and his mother was Renuja Begum. His father was an official of Biman Bangladesh Airlines. The family had five sons, Anis Ahmed, Aziz Ahmed, Sayed Hossain Tipu, Haris Ahmed, and Tofail Ahmed Joseph, and three daughters. He was an activist of the Bangladesh Chhatra League in Mohammadpur. His family was evicted from their home, purchased with a loan from the Bangladesh House Building Finance Corporation, by a criminal gang. He was stabbed in the early 1990s by gangster Morshed, injuring his lung.

== Career ==
Joseph was part of a powerful gang led by the Ahmed brothers, who controlled parts of Mohammadpur. The gang was involved in extortion, violence, and allegedly protected politicians of the Awami League, including Sheikh Hasina during the politically unstable 1980s and 1990s. He later became a member of the Seven Star Gang led by Subrata Bain.

In 1996, Joseph was one of three brothers implicated in the murder of Mustafizur Rahman Mustafa, a leader of the Freedom Party. Mustafizur Rahman Mustafa provided a deathbed statement, which became the basis for Joseph's conviction. In 2004, he was sentenced to death by the Speedy Trial Tribunal of Dhaka for his role in the killing. He had 10 other cases regarding illegal firearms and extortion. His brothers, Haris Ahmed and Anis Ahmed, were sentenced to life imprisonment in the case. On 20 September 2007, the High Court Division upheld his conviction.

On 9 December 2015, Joseph's death sentence was commuted to life imprisonment by the Bangladesh Supreme Court. He was represented by Khandaker Mahbub Hossain, Mahbub Ali, and A. M. Aminuddin. In 2018, during the tenure of his brother Aziz Ahmed as Chief of Army Staff, Joseph received a presidential pardon and was released from jail. The Prime Minister, Sheikh Hasina, recommended him for pardon. The pardon drew condemnation from civil society and international observers who questioned the transparency of the process and the apparent political favouritism. Before his pardon, he was staying in relative comfort at the Bangabandhu Sheikh Mujib Medical University as a VIP prisoner.

Joseph is the brother of General Aziz Ahmed, who served as Bangladesh's Chief of Army Staff from 2018 to 2021. According to an Al Jazeera's investigation documentary, All the Prime Minister's Men, Aziz played a key role in securing his brother's release. Recordings and documents obtained by Al Jazeera's Investigative Unit show that Aziz used his influence to support Joseph and his other fugitive brothers, Haris Ahmed and Anis Ahmed.

In 2019, Joseph was seen publicly attending his nephew's high-profile wedding in Dhaka alongside his fugitive brothers and General Aziz. The event was attended by the President of Bangladesh, Mohammad Abdul Hamid, and other political and military dignitaries. In 2021, the Bangladesh Government pardoned Haris Ahmed and Anis Ahmed. In late 2018, shortly after receiving the presidential pardon, Joseph was photographed meeting with Bangladesh's Home Minister Asaduzzaman Khan at the minister's residence. This meeting, which occurred just before his brother Aziz Ahmed's appointment as Chief of Army Staff, raised serious concerns about the political motivations behind Joseph's release. Further scrutiny emerged when Netra News and Al Jazeera revealed photographs of Joseph with Benazir Ahmed, then head of the Rapid Action Battalion and later Inspector General of Police. The Bangladesh government dismissed the report as anti-Bangladesh propaganda.

Both Joseph and his brother Haris secured Bangladeshi passports under fake names. They had also acquired citizenship and a passport from Antigua and Barbuda. After the fall of the Sheikh Hasina-led Awami League news in August 2024, their national identity cards were cancelled by the Bangladesh Election Commission. Their passports were later cancelled. In September 2024, Salim Prodhan, the chairman of the Japan-Bangladesh Security Printing and Papers Company Limited, filed an extortion case against him and his brothers.

== See also ==
- Haris Ahmed
- Aziz Ahmed
- Rapid Action Battalion
- All the Prime Minister's Men
