= S. M. Asadul Haque =

Major General of the Bangladesh Army

Asadul Haque
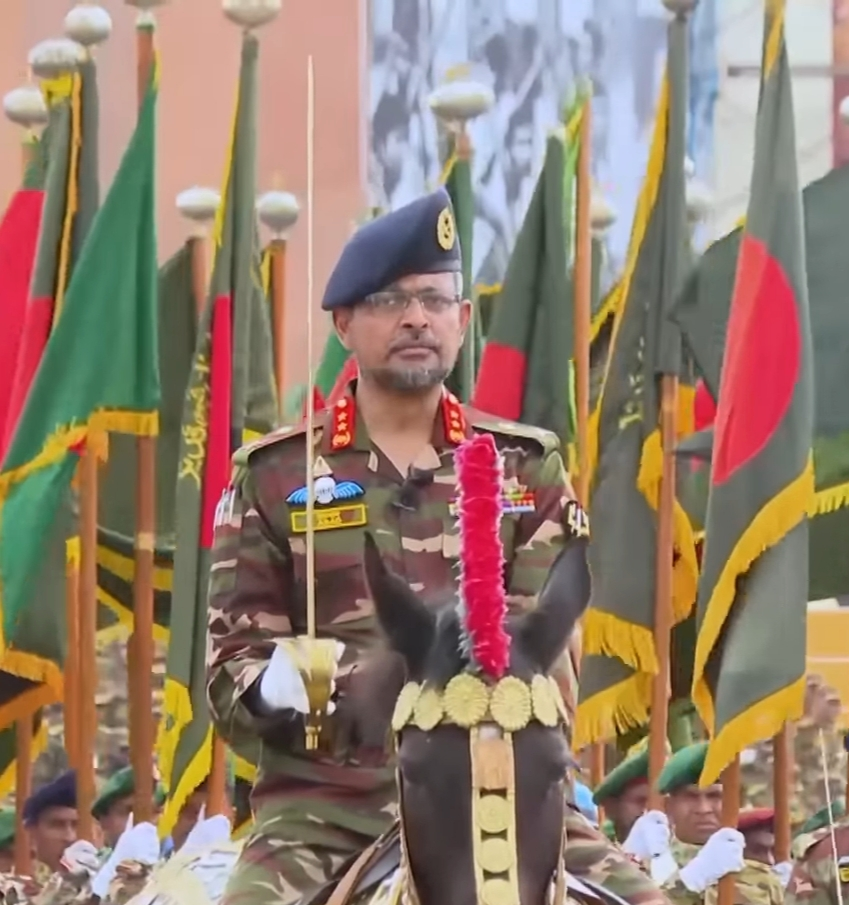
- Haque at National Parade 2026
- Military career
- Allegiance: Bangladesh
- Branch: Bangladesh Army
- Service years: 1993 - present
- Rank: Major General
- Unit: East Bengal Regiment
- Commands: Commandant of Defence Services Command and Staff College; GOC of 9th Infantry Division; GOC of 11th Infantry Division; Commander of 98th Composite Brigade
- Conflicts: MONUSCO

S. M. Asadul Haque (Note: ndc, psc) (Bengali: এস এম আসাদুল হক) is a two star officer of the Bangladesh Army. He is currently the Commandant of the Defence Services Command and Staff College (Bangladesh). He formerly served as general officer commanding (GOC) of the 9th Infantry Division and the area commander of the Savar Area. He is the 3rd colonel commandant of the Remount, Veterinary and Farm Corps.

== Career ==
Haque has served of general officer commanding (GOC) of the 11th Infantry Division and area commander of Bogura Area, located at Majhira Cantonment.

Asadul is an officer from the 29th BMA Long Course and belongs to the Infantry Corps.

He also serves as the chairman of the finance committee for the Bangladesh Army University of Engineering & Technology (BAUET). He is also listed as a member of the board of trustees for BAUET.

He has served as a peacekeeping affairs officer (P-4) for UNDPKO, having experience in international peacekeeping operations. He has also been noted alongside the chief of army staff during inspections.
