= General (Bangladesh) =

Highest achieved rank in the Bangladesh Army

General জেনারেল
- The insignia for the rank of general is the Nymphaeaceae the Emblem of Bangladesh, above two pips and crossed sword and baton.

- Vehicle Star plate of general
- Country: Bangladesh
- Service branch: Bangladesh Army
- Abbreviation: Gen
- Rank group: General officer Flag officer
- Rank: Four Star
- NATO rank code: OF-9
- Non-NATO rank: O-10
- Next lower rank: Lieutenant general
- Equivalent ranks: Admiral (Navy); Air Chief Marshal (Air force)

General (Note: Bengali: জেনারেল, romanized: Jenarel, IPA: [ˈdʒenaɾel]) is a four-star general officer rank in the Bangladesh Army. It is the highest achieved rank of the military. General is a higher rank than lieutenant general and was created as a direct equivalent of the British military rank of general. The next higher rank is Field Marshal, which currently doesn't exist in the Bangladesh Army.

The rank was established in 1972, when M. A. G. Osmani was promoted to this rank (As C-in-C). Currently, the Chief of Army Staff is the sole occupant of this highly senior rank.

== Insignia ==
The badges of this rank has a Crossed sword and two batons below the Shapla Emblem. Till 2013, the insignia was shapla and one pip over crossed sword baton which is now used by lieutenant generals. The general has red gorget patches with four golden stars to represent the four star rank.

== Appointment and term length ==
The position is appointed by The Prime Minister of The People's Republic of Bangladesh with the advice and consent of the President of Bangladesh. The Chief adviser may also have the authority for appointing in absence of the prime minister. The maximum length of the term is 3 years or at the age of 60 of the holder, whichever is earlier.

== List of generals ==
- General M. A. G Osmani
- General Mustafizur Rahman
- General Moeen U Ahmed
- General Md Abdul Mubeen
- General Iqbal Karim Bhuiyan
- General Abu Belal Muhammad Shafiul Haque
- General Aziz Ahmed
- General SM Shafiuddin Ahmed
- General Waker-uz-Zaman

== See also ==
- Chief of Army Staff (Bangladesh)
- List of serving generals of the Bangladesh Army
- Military ranks of Bangladesh
- Awards and decorations of the Bangladesh Armed Forces
