= Abdul Wadud (general) =

Bangladeshi military officer

- আব্দুল ওয়াদুদ
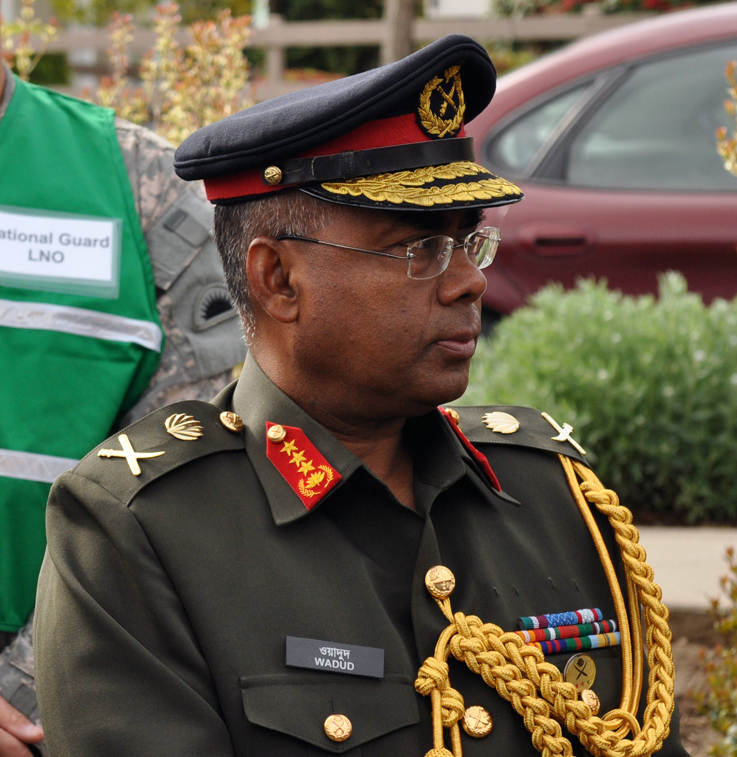

Principal Staff Officer of Armed Forces Division
- In office 13 June 2009 – 1 January 2013
- President: Zillur Rahman
- Prime Minister: Sheikh Hasina
- Preceded by: Abdul Mubeen
- Succeeded by: Belal Shafiul Haque

Military service
- Allegiance: Bangladesh
- Branch/service: Bangladesh Army
- Years of service: 1976–2013
- Rank: Lieutenant General
- Unit: Corps of Engineers
- Commands: Principal Staff Officer of Armed Forces Division; ENC of Army Headquarters; Commandant of Military Institute of Science and Technology; Vice-chancellor of Bangladesh University of Professionals

Abdul Wadud is a retired Bangladesh Army lieutenant general.

== Early life and education ==
Abdul Wadud completed his undergraduate degree in engineering from the Bangladesh University of Engineering and Technology and his graduate and postgraduate degrees in engineering from a university in the United States.

== Career ==
U.S. Army Maj. Gen. Raymond F. Rees and Lt. Gen. Abdul Wadud

Abdul Wadud served as the commandant of the Military Institute of Science & Technology from 27 March 2000 to 15 February 2001.

From 3 February 2006 to 27 July 2009, he served again as the commandant of the Military Institute of Science & Technology.

Abdul Wadud served as the principal staff officer of the Armed Forces Division. He was the first vice-chancellor of the Bangladesh University of Professionals. He is a former engineer-in-chief of the Bangladesh Army, and ex-managing director of Bangladesh Machine Tools Factory. During his tenure, he received Lieutenant General Jagath Jayasuriya of Sri Lanka during his tour of Bangladesh.

=== Civilian ===
In 2013, after his retirement, Abdul Wadud joined Summit Power as the managing director. In 2019, he received the ICMAB Best Corporate Award on behalf of Summit Group.
