= Iqbal Karim Bhuiyan =

Former (14th) Army chief of Bangladesh

Iqbal Karim Bhuiyan SBP, KLM
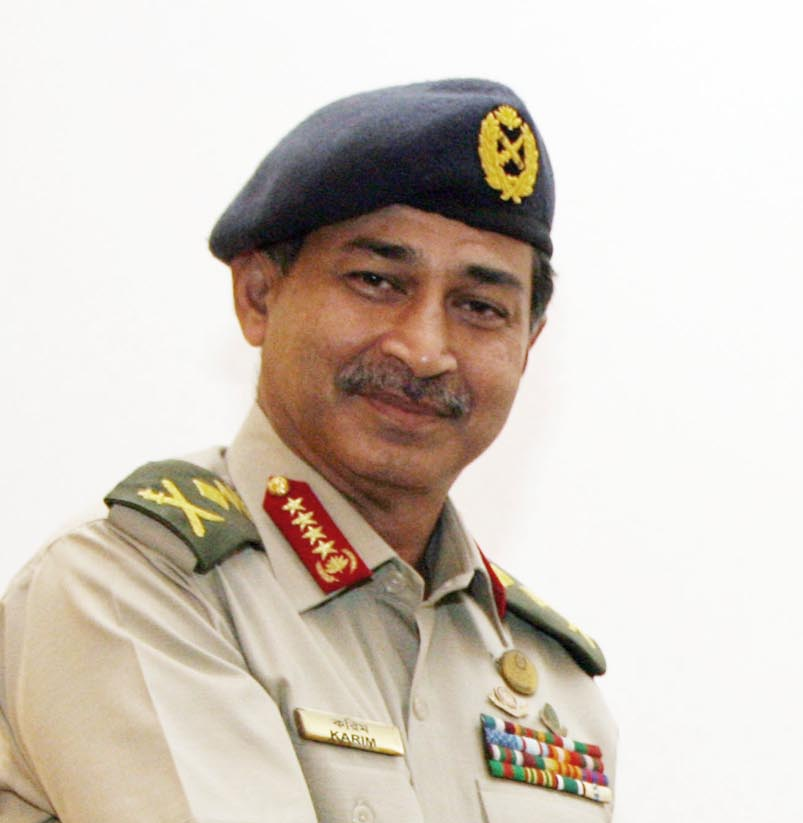
- Bhuiyan in 2013

14th Chief of Army Staff
- In office 25 June 2012 – 25 June 2015
- President: Zillur Rahman; Abdul Hamid
- Prime Minister: Sheikh Hasina
- Preceded by: Abdul Mubeen
- Succeeded by: Belal Shafiul Haque

Personal details
- Born: 2 June 1957 (age 69) Comilla, East Pakistan, Pakistan
- Spouse: Tahmina Yasmin
- Awards: Senabahini Padak(SBP); Kuwait Liberation Medal; Kuwait Liberation Medal (KSA); Independence Day Award

Military service
- Allegiance: Bangladesh
- Branch/service: Bangladesh Army
- Years of service: 1976 – 2015
- Rank: General
- Unit: East Bengal Regiment
- Commands: Commander of 105th Infantry Brigade; Commandant of School of Infantry and Tactics; GOC of 19th Infantry Division; Commandant of Defence Services Command and Staff College; GOC of 24th Infantry Division; GOC of 9th Infantry Division; Chief of General Staff at Army Headquarters; Quartermaster General at Army Headquarters; Chief of Army Staff
- Battles/wars: Chittagong Hill Tracts Conflict; Operation Desert Storm; UNAMSIL

Iqbal Karim Bhuiyan (Note: Bengali: ইকবাল করিম ভূঁইয়া) (Note: SBP, psc) (born 2 June 1957) is a retired Bangladeshi four star general who served as the 14th chief of army staff of the Bangladesh Army from 25 June 2012 to 25 June 2015. Bhuiyan was the chief of general staff and quartermaster general prior to his staff appointments and participated in Operation Desert Storm, where he received the Liberation of Kuwait Medal.

== Early life and education ==
Bhuiyan was born into a Bengali Muslim family in Comilla on 2 June 1957. He finished elementary school at Comilla Zilla School and high school at Faujdarhat Cadet College. Bhuiyan enlisted in the Bangladesh Military Academy, then at Cumilla Cantonment, in 1975. He was commissioned with Short Service Commission 3 (SSC 3) along with his colleague and predecessor, General Abdul Mubeen, in the East Bengal Regiment on 19 March 1976. He is a graduate of the Defence Services Command and Staff College and the United States Army Command and General Staff College. Bhuiyan attended the Defence Institute of International Legal Studies for peacekeeping at Naval War College, Newport, United States.

== Military career ==
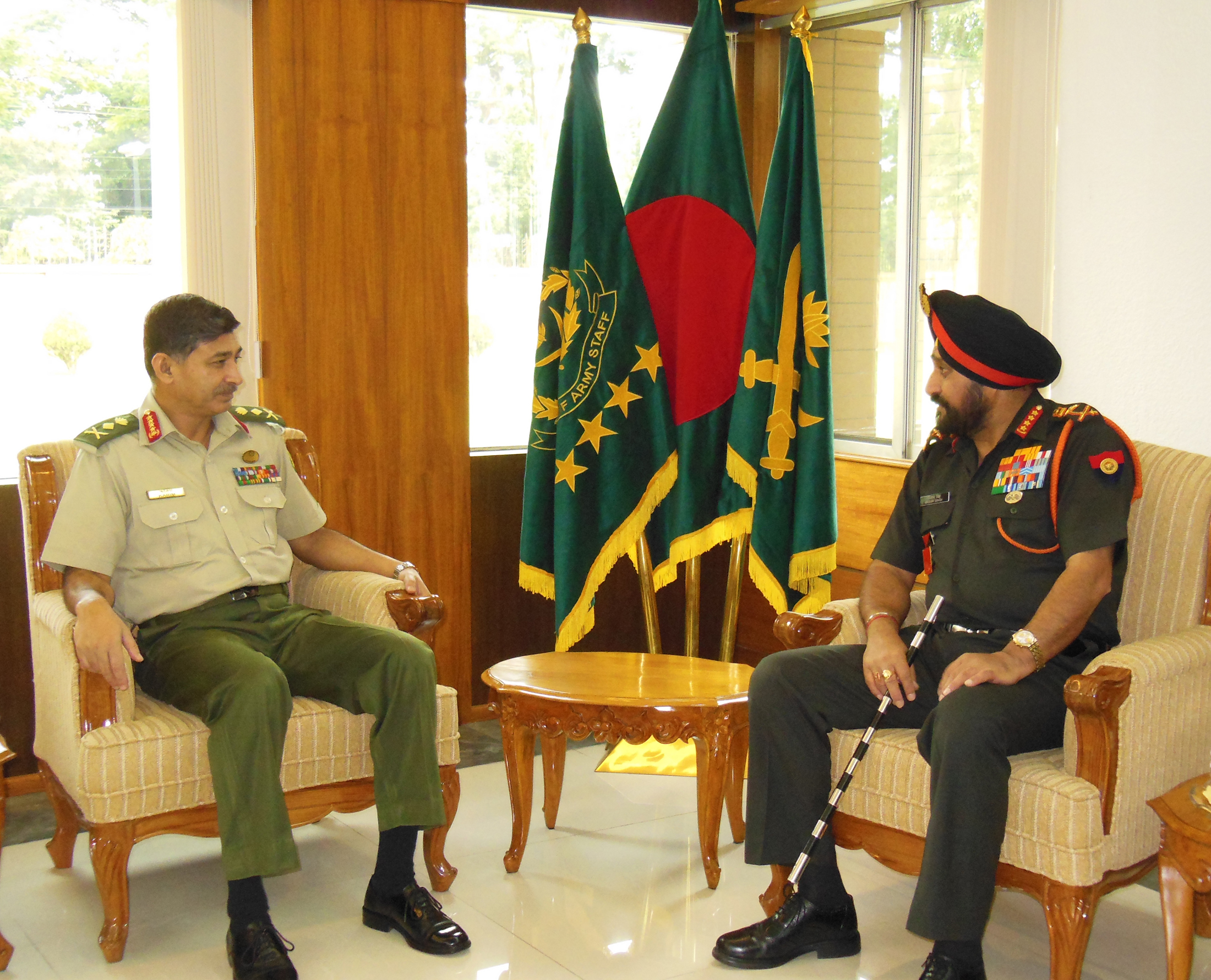
General Bhuiyan with Indian Chief of Army Staff Bikram Singh on 3 October 2012

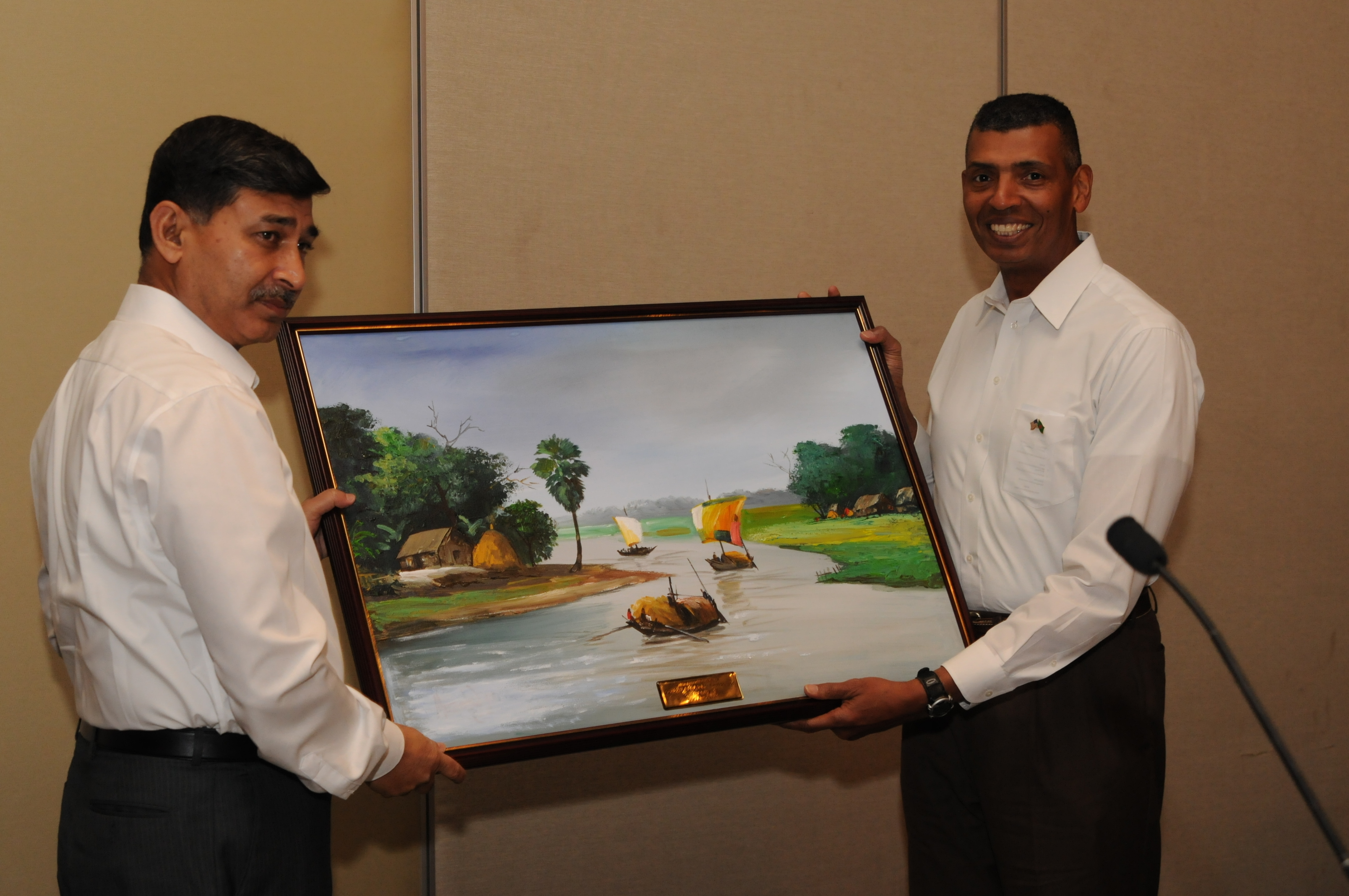
General Bhuiyan presenting a framed emulsion to United States Army General Vincent K. Brooks.

Bhuiyan served during the Chittagong Hill Tracts conflict, where he was adjutant of the 2nd East Bengal Regiment and also company commander Delta for the 15th East Bengal Regiment. As a major, he served as second in command of the 11th East Bengal Regiment, platoon commander at Bangladesh Military Academy, and deputy adjutant and quartermaster for the 72nd Infantry Brigade at Rangpur Cantonment. Bhuiyan was promoted to lieutenant colonel in 1992 and served as commanding officer of the 11th East Bengal Regiment. He returned to Bangladesh Military Academy and served as battalion commander.

In 1995, Bhuiyan was upgraded to colonel and was designated as one of the instructors for the Defence Services Command and Staff College. Bhuiyan later served as colonel staff of the 11th Infantry Division under Major General Hasan Mashhud Chowdhury and proxy deputy military secretary at army headquarters. He was promoted to brigadier general in 2000 and posted as commander of the 105th Infantry Brigade at Jessore Cantonment. Bhuiyan later served as commandant of the School of Infantry and Tactics till 2003.

In 2003, Bhuiyan was promoted to major general and was appointed as general officer commanding of the 19th Infantry Division and then the 24th Infantry Division. He was then designated as chief of the general staff, which he served till 2007 during the 2006–2008 Bangladesh political crisis. Due to differences with General Mooen U Ahmed, he was removed as CGS and transferred to the Defence Services Command and Staff College as its commandant. In 2009, he was appointed general officer commanding of the 9th Infantry Division. He was also the chairman of the Bangladesh Diesel Plant Limited. Bhuiyan was promoted to lieutenant general in May 2010 and returned to army headquarters as quartermaster general.

=== United Nations peacekeeping missions ===
Bhuiyan served in United Nations peacekeeping during the Gulf War in 1991, where he was part of the First Bangladesh Battalion, Bravo Company, that countered against the Iraqi Armed Forces in Kuwait City. Bhuiyan was awarded the Kuwait Liberation Medal for his distinguished actions. Bhuiyan also served as commander of the 2nd Bangladesh Battalion (BANBAT-2) with UNAMSIL in Sierra Leone from 1998 to 1999.

=== Chief of army staff ===
Bhuiyan was promoted to general on 25 June 2012 and was appointed chief of army staff, succeeding General Abdul Mubeen.

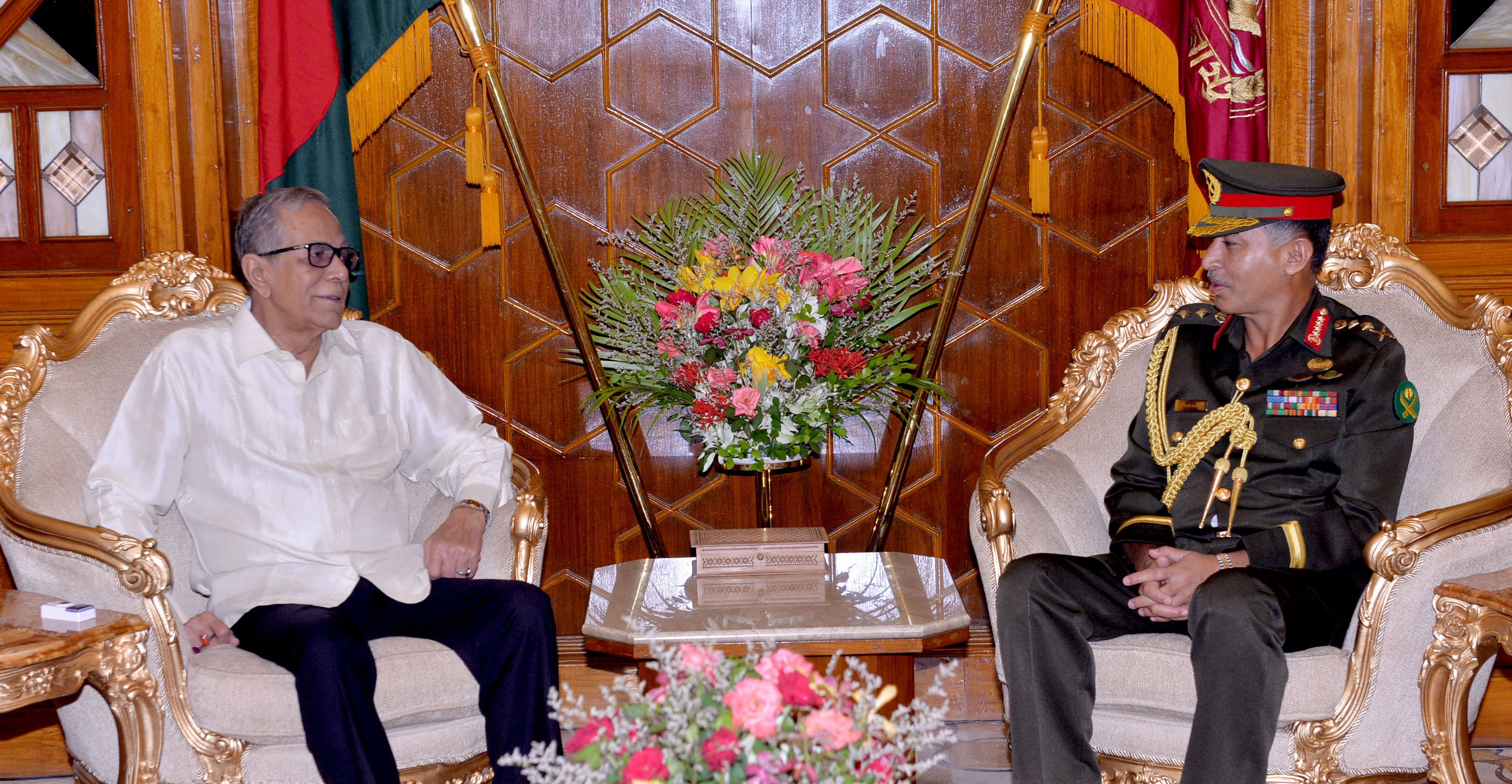
General Bhuiyan in forum with President Abdul Hamid in 2015

He invited Indian army chief General Bikram Singh in October 2012 to visit Bangladesh. In November 2012, he held a reception for veterans of the Bangladesh Liberation War. In 2013, he raised the flags of two infantry battalions, the 32nd and 33rd Bangladesh Infantry Regiments in Jalalabad Cantonment. Bhuiyan furthermore hosted the commander of the United States Army Pacific Command, General Vincent Brooks, in 2014 during the Pacific Armies Management Seminar and inaugurated the Bangladesh Golf Academy in 2015 at the Army Golf Club.

Bhuiyan also took active measures to prevent extrajudicial killings and the culture of enforced disappearances. He resisted pressure from Prime Minister Sheikh Hasina to send more young army officers to the Rapid Action Battalion and other paramilitary forces used by the Awami League to suppress opposition. His actions put him in direct dissension with Major General Tarique Siddique, then military advisor to the prime minister. Bhuiyan went on leave per retirement on 25 June 2015 and was succeeded by General Belal Shafiul Haque.

== Retirement ==
Bhuiyan established a power-supplying firm called Winnievision Power Ltd, which primarily invests in LNG-based power plants.

== Political commentary ==
=== Support for students ===
Bhuiyan was among several retired military personnel who expressed support for the student movement leading the 2024 Bangladesh quota reform movement and the Non-cooperation movement and called on the government of Prime Minister Sheikh Hasina to "withdraw the armed forces from the street immediately". On August 4, 2024, he organized a press conference where he and other retired army officers condemned the attacks on innocent protestors and subsequently called on the troops to return to the barracks. In his speech, he said:

When the attackers were forced to retreat in the face of the uprising, the Bangladeshi Armed Forces were deployed in the next phase. By using them as shields, sometimes at the forefront, sometimes behind, other forces are continuing to inflict violence, oppression, and torture on this mass movement. The patriotic armed forces should not bear the responsibility for such a situation. The Bangladeshi Armed Forces have never faced off against the people in the past, nor have they pointed guns at them.

He also uploaded the color red on his Facebook profile in support of the movement on 31 July 2024. This prompted many other retired army officers to also upload red profile pictures. He stated later on, in his official social media page, that this act infuriated Hasina, and she tried to force him to take it down.

After the fall of Hasina, in response to a potential military conflict with India, Bhuiyan suggested that the French concept of levée en masse could be introduced.

=== Support for reforms ===
After the uprising against Hasina, he released a number of writings regarding his tenure in the army. He highlighted how he tried to stop extrajudicial killings and, moreover, called on Waker-Uz-Zaman to remove army officers from RAB. He stated in a social media post:

We have reached a point where urgent decisions regarding RAB are necessary. I would request the army chief to recommend to the government that this institution be disbanded. If that is not possible, then military officers should be permanently withdrawn from RAB. The current army chief has the independence to do this, which previous army chiefs did not have. For this reason, I urge him to complete what we were unable to do.

Bhuiyan also called for a formal inquiry to clarify unanswered questions about Sheikh Hasina's escape and the army's internal divisions during the crisis. Furthermore, he warned against a "1/11-style" military intervention against the interim government of Professor Yunus.

During the trial of Major General Ziaul Ahsan, Bhuiyan's testimony was used. In his statement, Bhuiyan stated that he had asked Colonel (later Lt. Gen.) Mujibur Rahman and Brigadier Jaglul to stop Zia's actions.

== Honours ==

Nirapotta Padak Medal	Dabanal Padak Medal	Uttoron Padak Medal	Independence Day Award Medal
Flood Relief of 1988 Medal	Great Flood Relief of 1998 Medal	1991 National Election Medal	1996 National Election Medal
Silver Jubilee Medal (25 years of liberation)	Golden Jubilee Medal (50th anniversary of East Bengal Regiment)	30 years service	20 years service
10 years service	Kuwait Liberation Medal (Kuwait)	Kuwait Liberation Medal (Saudi Arabia)	UNIKOM Medal

== Dates of rank ==
Insignia	Rank	Component	Date of rank	Ref
	Second Lieutenant	Bangladesh Army	19 March 1976	
	Lieutenant	Bangladesh Army		
	Captain	Bangladesh Army		
	Major	Bangladesh Army		
	Lieutenant Colonel	Bangladesh Army	1992	
	Colonel	Bangladesh Army	1995	
	Brigadier General	Bangladesh Army	2000	
	Major General	Bangladesh Army	2003	
	Lieutenant General	Bangladesh Army	May 2010	
	General (COAS)	Bangladesh Army	25 June 2012	

== Family ==
Bhuiyan is married to Tahmina Yasmin, and the couple has two daughters and one son.

Preceded by General Md Abdul Mubeen	Chief of Army Staff of the Bangladesh Army; 25 June 2012 - 25 June 2015	Succeeded by General Abu Belal Muhammad Shafiul Huq
