= Mohammad Abdul Mubeen =

Former (13th) Army chief of Bangladesh

- মুহাম্মদ আব্দুল মুবিন
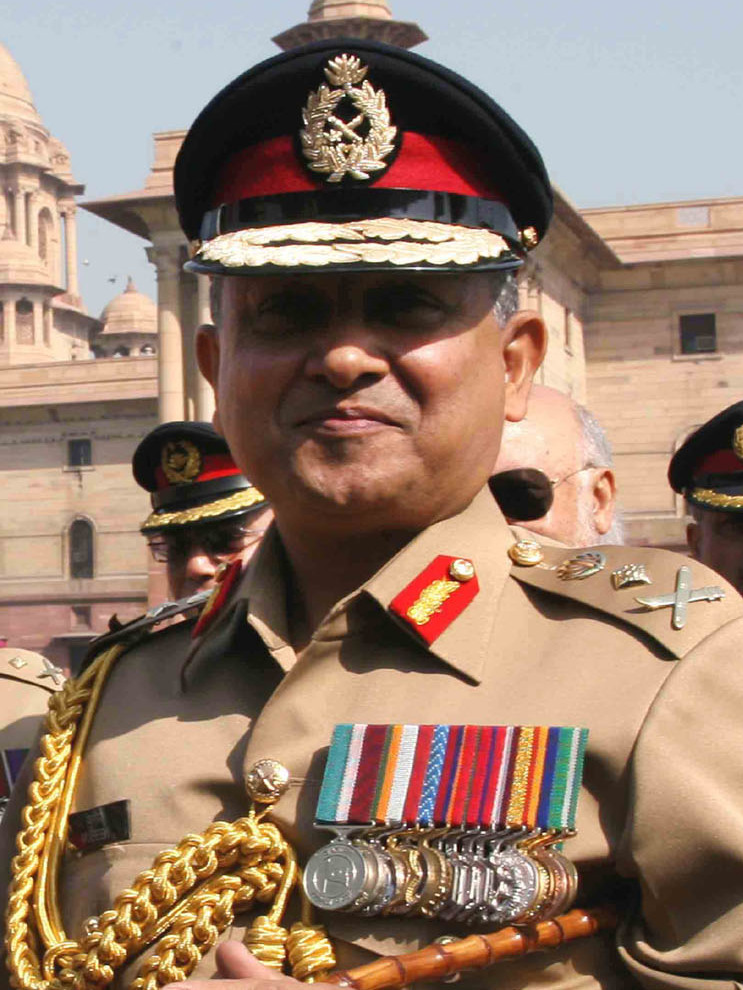
- Mubeen in 2010

13th Chief of Army Staff
- In office 16 June 2009 – 25 June 2012
- President: Zillur Rahman
- Prime Minister: Sheikh Hasina
- Preceded by: Moeen U Ahmed
- Succeeded by: Iqbal Karim Bhuiyan

Principal Staff Officer of Armed Forces Division
- In office 4 June 2008 – 12 June 2009
- President: Iajuddin Ahmed; Zillur Rahman
- Prime Minister: Fakhruddin Ahmed (acting); Sheikh Hasina
- Preceded by: Masud Uddin Chowdhury
- Succeeded by: Abdul Wadud

Personal details
- Born: 10 March 1957 (age 69) Kishoreganj, East Pakistan, Pakistan
- Awards: Independence Day Award

Military service
- Allegiance: Bangladesh
- Branch/service: Bangladesh Army
- Years of service: 1976–2012
- Rank: General
- Unit: East Bengal Regiment
- Commands: Commander of 309th Infantry Brigade; Director General of Bangladesh Institute of International and Strategic Studies; Commandant of Defence Services Command and Staff College; Commandant of National Defence College; GOC of 55th Infantry Division; GOC of 24th Infantry Division; Principal Staff Officer of Armed Forces Division; Chief of Army Staff
- Battles/wars: ONUMOZ

Mohammad Abdul Mubeen (Note: Bengali: মুহাম্মদ আব্দুল মুবিন) (Note: ndc, psc) (born 10 March 1957) is a retired Bangladeshi four star general who served as the chief of army staff of the Bangladesh Army from 2009 to 2012. He was the 10th principal staff officer of the Armed Forces Division and served as general officer commanding of two divisions. He was the chairman and nominated director of United Power Generation & Distribution Company Limited.

== Education ==
Mubeen was a cadet of Mirzapur Cadet College. He was commissioned in the East Bengal Regiment of the Bangladesh Army on 30 November 1976 from the Bangladesh Military Academy's 3rd SSC (short service commission) course with general Iqbal Karim Bhuiyan. Mubeen was a graduate of both Defence Services Command and Staff College and National Defence College. Mubeen also completed the NATO Weapon Conversion Course, Infantry Weapon Course, Senior Command Course and attended workshops and seminars in at least 15 countries, including India and China.

== Military career ==
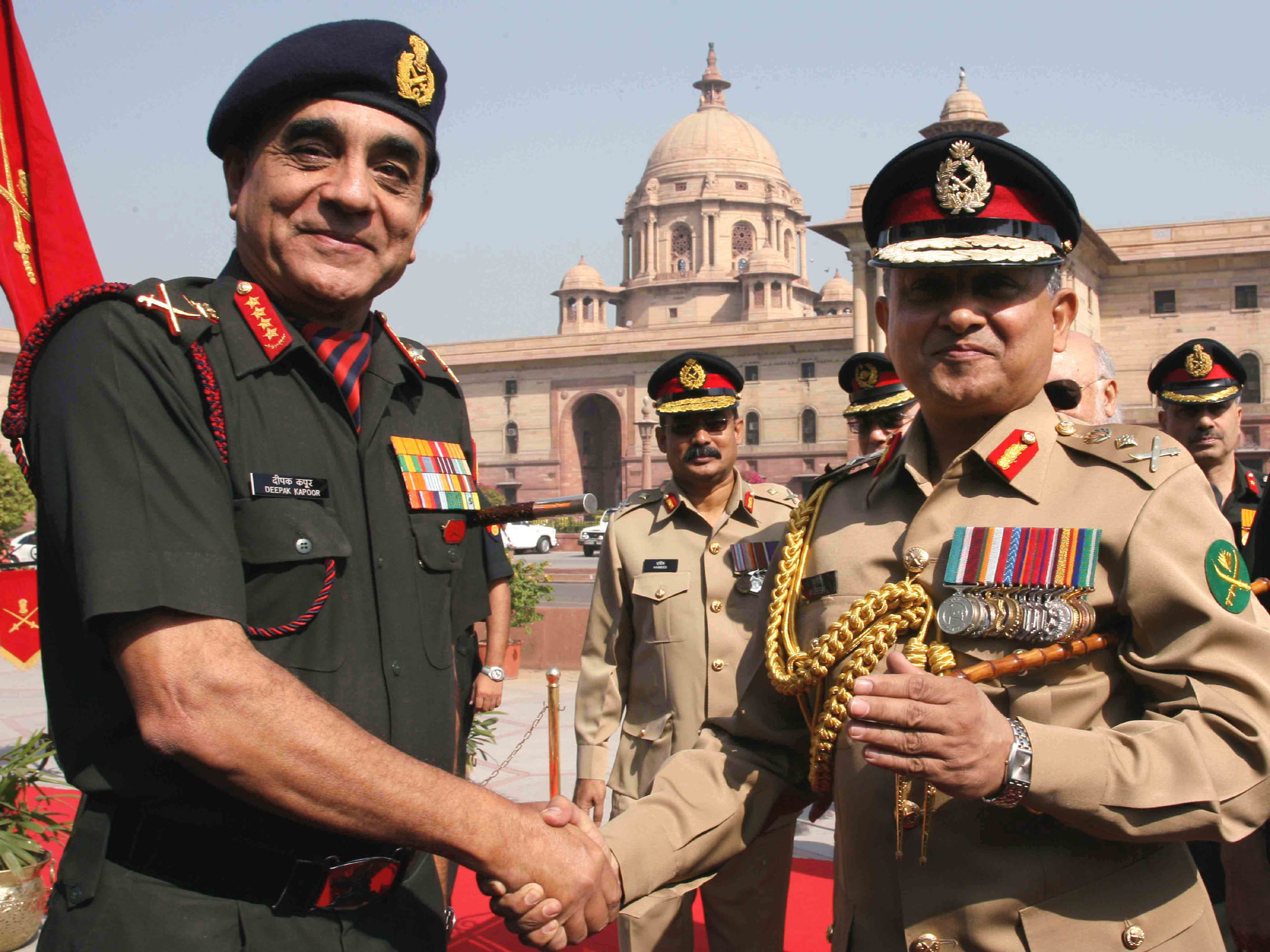
General Mubeen with Indian Chief of Army Staff General Deepak Kapoor at New Delhi on 15 March 2010.

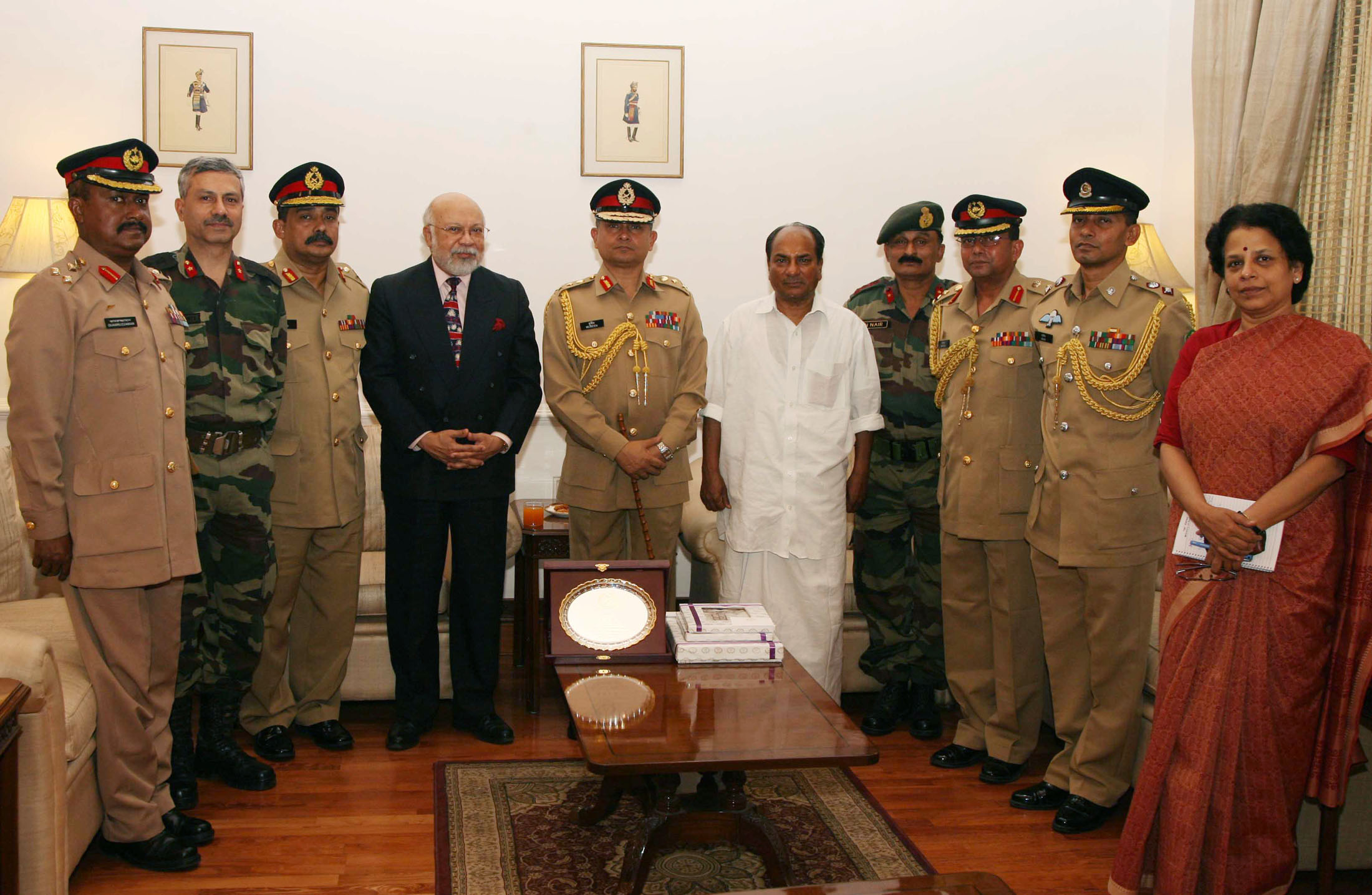
General Mubeen in forum with Indian Defence Minister A. K. Antony on 2010.

Mubeen commanded two infantry battalions as lieutenant colonel. At the staff level, he served as brigade major at 46th Independent Infantry Brigade, general staff officer first grade (operations) in an infantry divisional headquarters and in Bangladesh Military Academy, he was also the private secretary to the former chief of army staff lieutenant general Nuruddin Khan. As brigadier general, he was appointed as director of military training directorate at army headquarters and commanded an infantry brigade.

He was promoted to major general in 2003 and designated as director general of Bangladesh Institute of International and Strategic Studies and was commandant of the Defence Services Command and Staff College. Mubeen tenured as general officer commanding of the 55th infantry division and the 24th infantry division until 2008. He was then upgraded to lieutenant general and assigned as the principal staff officer of the Armed Forces Division on 4 June 2008. Mubeen rendered his service as a peacekeeper in the capacity of chief of staff (Northern Region) in United Nations Operation in Mozambique (ONUMUZ).

=== Army Chief (2009-2012) ===
In June 2009, he was made the new Army Chief, succeeding Mooen U Ahmed.

As army chief, he strengthened ties with India. Under his tenure, both countries had joint military exercises.

== Personal life ==
He is married to Syeda Sharifa Khanom, and has two sons and a daughter. His elder son Sharif is a third-generation army officer; Abdul Mubeen's father was an army officer as well. He enjoyed golfing as a pastime, and was a decorated player in the army hockey team during his early days.

== Honours ==

| Nirapotta Padak Medal | Dabanal Padak Medal | Uttoron Padak Medal | |
| Independence Day Award Medal | Flood Relief of 1988 Medal | Cyclone Relief of 1991 Medal | 1991 National Election Medal |
| 1996 National Election Medal | 2001 National Election Medal | Silver Jubilee Medal (25 years of liberation) | Golden Jubilee Medal (50th anniversary of East Bengal Regiment) |
| 30 years service | 20 years service | 10 years service | ONUMOZ Medal |

| Preceded by General Moeen Uddin Ahmed | Chief of Army Staff of the Bangladesh Army; 16 June 2009 - 25 June 2012 | Succeeded by General Iqbal Karim Bhuiyan |
