= Moeen U Ahmed =

Former (12th) Army chief of Bangladesh

Moeen Uddin Ahmed
- মঈন উদ্দিন আহমেদ
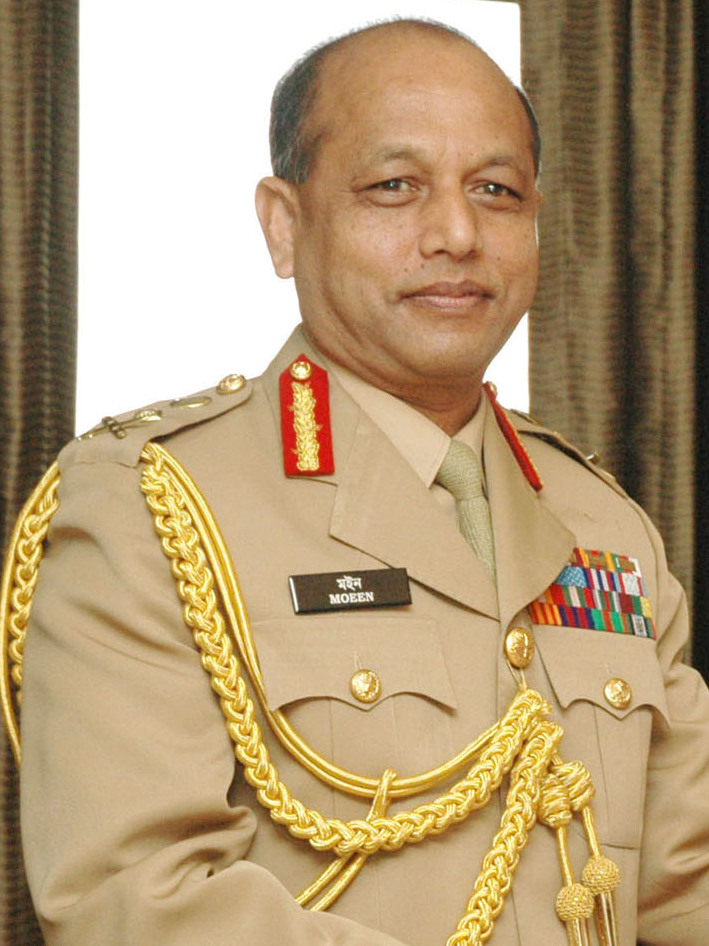
- Ahmed in 2008

12th Chief of Army Staff
- In office 15 June 2005 – 15 June 2009
- President: Iajuddin Ahmed; Zillur Rahman
- Prime Minister: Khaleda Zia; Iajuddin Ahmed (acting); Fazlul Haque(acting); Fakhruddin Ahmed (acting); Sheikh Hasina
- Preceded by: Hasan Mashhud Chowdhury
- Succeeded by: Abdul Mubeen

Personal details
- Born: 21 January 1953 (age 73) Begumganj, Noakhali, East Bengal, Pakistan
- Education: Bangladesh Military Academy; National Defence College
- Awards: Independence Day Award

Military service
- Allegiance: Bangladesh
- Branch/service: Bangladesh Army
- Years of service: 1975–2009
- Rank: General
- Unit: East Bengal Regiment
- Commands: Commander of 305th Infantry Brigade; Commander of 222nd Infantry Brigade; GOC of 19th Infantry division; GOC of 24th Infantry Division; Chief of General Staff (CGS) in Army Headquarters; 13th Chief of Army Staff
- Battles/wars: Bangladesh Rifles revolt; Chittagong Hill Tracts Conflict; UNAMIR

Moeen Uddin Ahmed (Note: Bengali: মঈন উদ্দিন আহমেদ) (Note: ndc, psc) (born 21 January 1953 in Begumganj, Noakhali) is a former Bangladeshi four star general and was the 12th Chief of Army Staff of the Bangladesh Army from 15 June 2005 to 15 June 2009. He has worked in Bangladesh High Commission in Islamabad, Pakistan as a Defence Attaché and previously served as a UN Peacekeeper in United Nations Assistance Mission for Rwanda as a colonel in 1995. Ahmed is the first army chief of staff from Bangladesh Military Academy. He is also the first four star operational general of the army since General M. A. G. Osmani.

Ahmed's epitome was ambiguous when he was the chief administrator during the 2006–08 Bangladeshi political crisis. His military-backed agendas are also credited for paving the way towards independent judiciary and a brief civil reformation. Initially, the Bangladeshi citizens were favourable for the sense relief it facilitated after unprecedented anarchy on the streets of major cities but later on, people started to be dubious about the intention or objective of the military-backed interim government. Events like in Ahmed's writing views on politics and patronizing a particular political party led by Ferdous Ahmed Qureshi were not received positively at a backdrop of delivering effort in terminating the political career of former prime ministers Khaleda Zia and Sheikh Hasina. He is also criticised for his failure to prevent the 2009 Bangladesh Rifles revolt, which killed 56 Army officers and 17 civilians. The revolt also caused a weakening of the Bangladesh Army command and Bangladesh Rifles. Ahmed appeared in public on September 5, 2024 via his YouTube channel and shared his version of the Pilkhana Mutiny after a long silence.

== Military career ==
Ahmed completed his preliminary education at Pakistan Air Force College Sargodha in then West Pakistan from 1965 to 1970. He served the Bangladesh Air Force for a year as a flight cadet, then he went to Russia for flight training but was dismissed due to health conditions. Ahmed later joined Bangladesh Military Academy, and was commissioned on 11 January 1975 at 2nd East Bengal Regiment in the rank of second lieutenant.

Ahmed started his instructional career as Weapon Training Officer and then platoon commander in Bangladesh Military Academy. As lieutenant colonel, Ahmed commanded two infantry battalions, served in Military Operations Directorate at Army Headquarters and designated as garrison staff of an infantry division while being colonel. Ahmed served a considerable duration at Defence Services Command and Staff College as training instructor, staff officer and eventually the chief instructor. As brigadier general, Ahmed commanded two infantry brigades at Rangamati and Saidpur respectively.

He was ameliorated to major general in 2002 and was appointed as the general officer commanding of the 19th Infantry Division and the following year the 24th Infantry Division. He then tenured as Chief of General Staff in 2004 and eventually promoted to lieutenant general on 15 June 2005. He was appointed as chief of army staff during Third Khaleda ministry. He also obtained his honour National Defence College course after becoming a three star general. As army chief, Ahmed was critical during the superseding of Major general Fazle Elahi Akbar. On 24 May 2007, he was promoted to general by then President Iajuddin Ahmed.

== Controversy ==
=== 2006–08 Bangladeshi political crisis ===
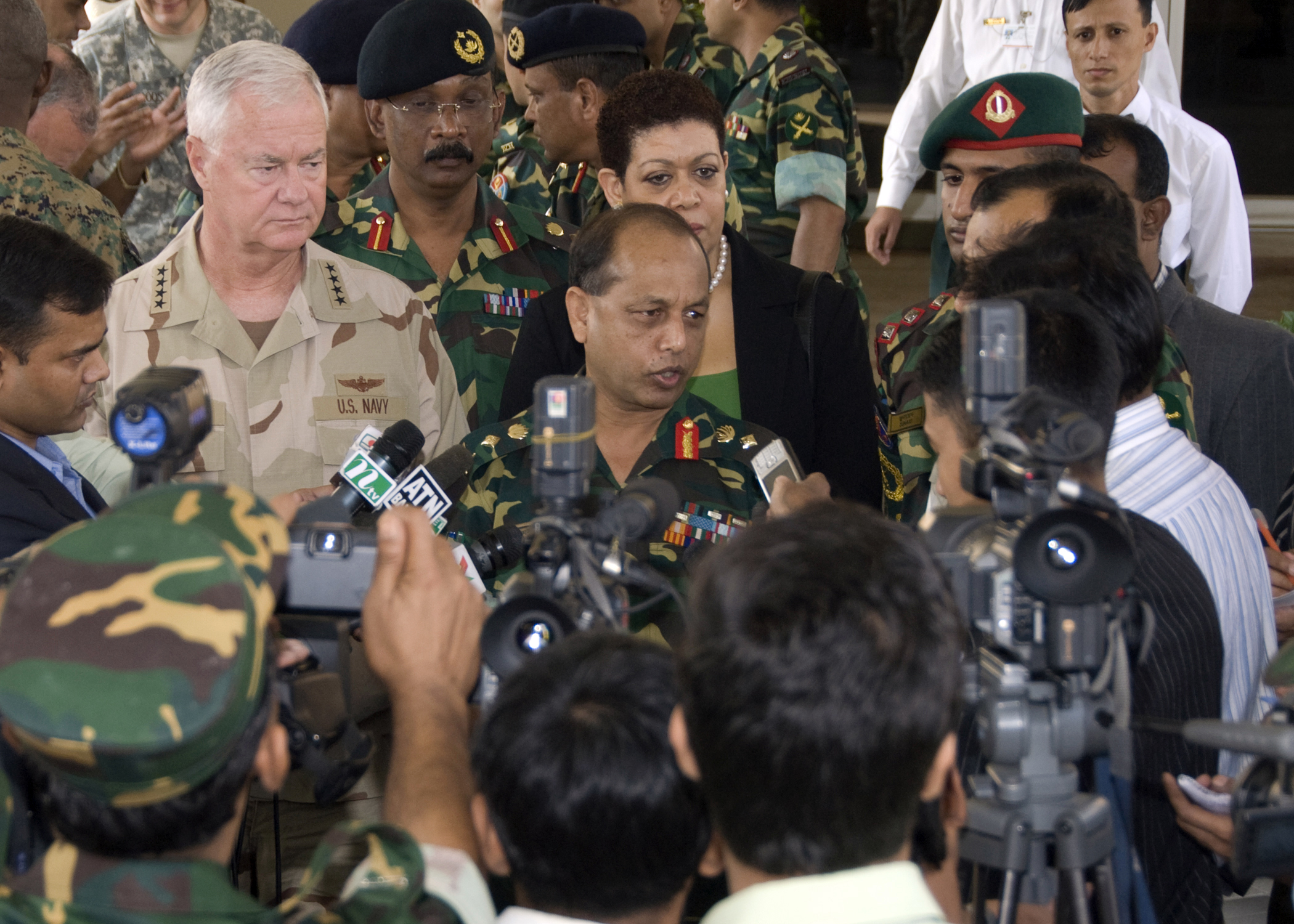
Admiral Timothy J. Keating, commander of U.S. Pacific Command, and General Ahmed, attending a press conference after meeting at Army Headquarters.

Ahmed was the key force behind the declaration of emergency in the country on 11 January 2007 widely known as 1/11 phenomenon. Ahmed has notoriety for extending his one-year tenure of army chief, which is fixed for a time period. He has been accused of playing a controversial role by helping the caretaker government of Bangladesh to retain power after constitution stipulated three months duration. He has been identified as the key schemer behind the non-elected government but he has also been praised for arranging voter ID cards before 29 December 2008. He and the government has been accused of domestically and globally to de-politicise the country. Hundreds of political figures, including two ex-prime ministers, ministers, lawmakers and local government heads, have been imprisoned by the regime accusing them of corruption. Although some of these figures were notoriously corrupt, most of them do not have any specific allegation against them. The government's anti-corruption drive was widely praised and criticized. However, Ahmed has accused of numerous controversial allegations during his tenure. Some quarters also hold him liable for defaming the military while he was in charge of enhancing its fame. Even though, Ahmed has been known as a moderate-minded officer, his final role had earned him as controversial figure of Bangladesh military history. The most prominent being the killing of 57 military officers by the border guards of the country during his final tenure. Ahmed heard to have said that tragic killings of so many officers led him even to thoughts of self-immolation.

=== Political involvement ===
Ahmed attempted to strike deals with political leaders in order to secure support for the government. Former president Hussain Muhammad Ershad who remained generally at unease during the rule of Sheikh Hasina and on toes during the rule of Khaleda Zia, was at comfort at this time indicating a deal between the two generals It is widely perceived that supported Ahmed in implementing the Minus Two Formula a popular name for an attempt made by Ahmed to end political career of former prime ministers Begum Khaleda Zia and Sheikh Hasina In the book he gave formula of his own devised democracy. Such prescription on politics by a serving general is beyond his professional entitlement and thus is punishable in Bangladesh Army as with any other armies. Ahmed however could grab power with ease as he cleverly kept most structure intact including incumbent physically fragile president in power His ascending to power became further easy for the tacit international support that he enjoyed through the diplomats who were then in Dhaka. He although seemed initially to have been imitating other military dictators hoping to turn into a civilian head of state but later it was revealed that his ambition was exemplarily low. He merely wanted to go on retirement after completing his normal tenure. The fact was denuded by Indian President Pranab Mukharjee in his autobiography published in 2017. President Mukharjee explained how Ahmed lowered him before a foreign president to merely save his job and in turn how the president assured and secured his job from Sheikh Hasina. Many critics view this particular behaviour of Ahmed as perfidious. The relegation of ambition could be due to the clumsy realities that he soon started to realize that his whole move could end in an indigestible political career as opposed to his smooth military career. Moreover, contribution of diplomats in the disrepute that Ahmed earned was also substantial. Their involvement in domestic politics had gone beyond diplomatic norms in which they seemed to have connived with Ahmed which also induced in him a political ambition.

=== Minus-Two and Wikileaks ===
According to US Embassy cables: "A few months before their arrest, the then army chief Moeen U Ahmed said reforms in political parties were essential but difficult to carry out with Hasina or Khaleda in Bangladesh, according to another cable sent by the then US ambassador Patricia A Butenis on April 22, 2007."

“Moeen said senior Bangladesh Nationalist Party leaders met recently with government officials and decided that [BNP Chairperson Khaleda] Zia must go,” said the cable Butenis wrote citing discussion with Ahmed. former prime minister, Hasina, who left for the US on 15 March 2007, was indefinitely barred from returning and then prime minister Khaleda was expected to depart for Saudi Arabia shortly, she added.

Although the caretaker government legislations and executive actions were most repealed, and political leaders claimed it was unconstitutional, the election that was held under the caretaker government was considered legitimate by the winning party.

== Family life ==
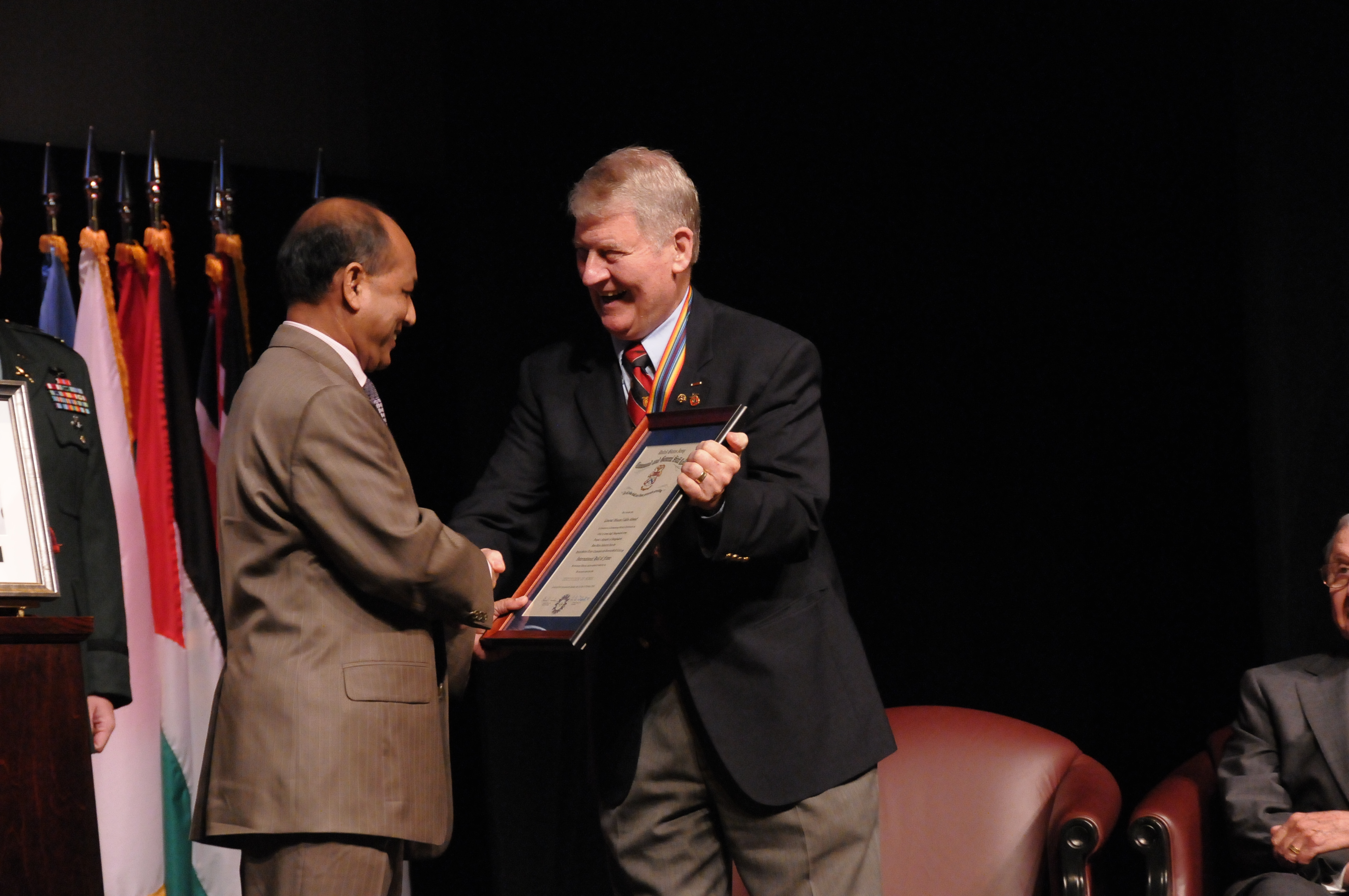
Ahmed receiving IHoF induction certificate from former president of the Kansas City Chapter of the Military Order of the World Wars, Captain Dorsey Moore, during the IHoF ceremony on 1 October 2009

Ahmed is married to Naznin Moeen, and they have a son and a daughter; Nihat Ahmed and Sabrina Ahmed. After retirement, he relocated to United States of America. Following the fall of the Sheikh Hasina-led Awami League regime, his and his brothers' home in Begumganj Upazila were burned down.

== Honours ==

Songbidhan Padak	Nirapattya Padak	Dabanal Padak	Uttoron Padak
Independence Award	Plaban 1988 Padak	Ghurnijhar 1991 Padak	Mahaplaban Padak 1998
Sangsadia Nirbachan 1991	Sangsadia Nirbachan 1996	Silver Jubilee Medal	Golden Jubilee Medal
Jesthata Padak III	Jesthata Padak II	Jesthata Padak I	UNAMIR Medal
Order of National Security Merit			
