= 33rd Infantry Division (Bangladesh) =

Division of the Bangladesh army

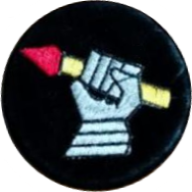
- Insignia of 33rd Infantry Division
- Country: Bangladesh
- Branch: Bangladesh Army
- Type: Infantry
- Size: Division
- Garrison/HQ: Cumilla Cantonment

Commanders
- Current commander: Major General Mohamad Mohtashim Hyder Chowdhury
- Notable commanders: Major General Anwar Hussain; Major General Aziz Ahmed; Major General Abdul Hafiz

The 33rd Infantry Division (Bengali: ৩৩ পদাতিক ডিভিশন) is a formation of the Bangladesh Army based in Cumilla Cantonment.

== Components ==
- Cavalry
  - 6th Bengal Cavalry Regiment
- Artillery
  - 33rd Artillery Brigade
- Infantry
  - 15th Bangladesh Infantry Regiment
  - 44th Infantry Brigade
  - 101st Infantry Brigade
- Combat support
  - Field Intelligence Unit (FIU)
  - 2nd Engineers Battalion
  - 5th Signals Battalion
