= Chief of Army Staff (Bangladesh) =

Commander of the Bangladesh Army

- সেনাবাহিনী প্রধান
- Crest of the Chief of Army Staff

- Flag of the Chief of Army Staff

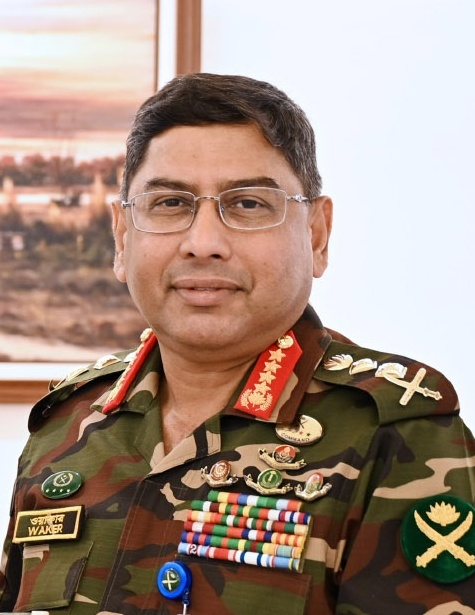
- Incumbent; General Waker-Uz-Zaman since 23 June 2024
- Bangladesh Army
- Type: Army Administrator of Bangladesh Armed Forces
- Abbreviation: CAS
- Member of: National Committee on Security Affairs
- Reports to: President; Prime Minister
- Residence: Dhaka Cantonment
- Seat: Dhaka Cantonment
- Appointer: The Prime Minister; with President advice and consent
- Term length: 3 years or age 60, whichever comes first
- Constituting instrument: The Army Act, 1952 of (Act No. XXXIX OF 1952)
- Precursor: Commander-in-Chief and Chief of staff of the Mukti Bahini
- Formation: 12 April 1971; 55 years ago
- First holder: General M.A.G Osmani (Commander-in-chief); Major General Mohammad Abdur Rab (Chief of staff)
- Unofficial names: Army Chief
- Deputy: Chief of the General Staff
- Salary: ৳160000 (US$1,300) per month (incl. allowances)
- Website: army.mil.bd

The Chief of Army Staff (CAS; Bengali: সেনাবাহিনী প্রধান, romanized: Śenabahini Prodhan) is the professional head and highest-ranking commissioned officer of the Bangladesh Army. The Chief of Army Staff is responsible for the overall command, administration, training, and operational preparedness of the army, and serves as the principal military adviser to the Government of Bangladesh on land-based defence and national security matters.

The office is held by an officer with the rank of General and is appointed by the President of Bangladesh on the advice of the Prime Minister of Bangladesh. The Chief of Army Staff is a senior member of the Armed Forces Division and plays a central role in maintaining national defence, internal security support, disaster response, and participation in United Nations peacekeeping operations. The Chief of Army staff has been a four-star rank since 2007. Prior to that, the Chief of Army Staff was a three-star rank from 1978 to 2007. During the liberation war of Bangladesh in 1971, Major general M. A. Rab was the Chief of Staff of the Bangladesh Army under the combined command of Bangladesh Forces which served as the origins of Bangladesh Armed Forces and General M. A. G. Osmani was the Commander-in-Chief. After the War of Independence, Bangladesh Army was officially reverted to the Ministry of Defense in 1972, and major general K. M. Shafiullah was appointed the Chief of Army Staff. The incumbent Chief of Army Staff is general Waker-Uz-Zaman. The office of the Chief of Army Staff functions from the Army Headquarters, which is located in the Dhaka Cantonment.

== History ==
Prior the independence of Bangladesh, the Commander of the Eastern Command was the chief military administrator of the Pakistan Armed Forces stationed in then East Pakistan. Lieutenant general A. A. K. Niazi was the last commander of eastern commander before the Pakistani Instrument of Surrender on 16 December 1971. After the proclamation of Bangladeshi independence, general M. A. G. Osmani served as the commander-in-chief of the Bangladesh forces and major general Abdur Rab as the chief of staff of the army. Osmani eventually became the first commander-in-chief on 12 April 1971. While Osmani served as commander of the combined Bangladesh armed forces, Rab oversaw the army operations till April 1972.

On 6 April 1972, prime minister Sheikh Mujibur Rahman restructured the bureaucracy of the Bangladesh armed forces which were directly commanded by Osmani and abolished Osmani's post as commander-in-chief. Major general K. M. Shafiullah, was made the chief of army staff succeeding Major general Rab on 7 April 1972. President Ziaur Rahman became the first army chief with the rank of lieutenant general in 1977 and Moeen U Ahmed embellished as the first four star army chief in 2007.

== List of chiefs of staff of the Army ==
The following table chronicles the appointees, to the office of the Chief of Army Staff or its preceding positions since the independence war of Bangladesh.

=== Commander-in-Chief, Mukti Bahini (1971–1972) ===
No.	Picture	Commander-in-Chief	Took office	Left office	Time in office	Unit of Commission
1	M. A. G. Osmanipsc	General; M. A. G. Osmani psc (1918–1984)	12 April 1971	6 April 1972	360 days	Army Service Corps

=== Chief of staff, Mukti Bahini (1971–1972) ===
No.	Picture	Chief of staff	Took office	Left office	Time in office	Unit of Commission
-	Mohammad Abdur RabBir Uttom	Major General; Mohammad Abdur Rab; Bir Uttom (1919–1975)	11 July 1971	6 April 1972	270 days	Army Service Corps

=== Chiefs of Army staff (1971–present) ===
No.	Picture	Chief of Army Staff	Took office	Left office	Time in office	Unit of Commission
1	M. A. G. Osmanipsc	General; M. A. G. Osmani psc (1918–1984)	12 April 1971	6 April 1972	1 year, 24 days	Army Service Corps
2	Kazi Muhammad ShafiullahBir Uttom, psc	Major General; Kazi Muhammad Shafiullah; Bir Uttom, psc (1934–2025)	7 April 1972	25 August 1975	3 years, 140 days	Punjab Regiment
3	Ziaur RahmanBir Uttom, psc	Major General; Ziaur Rahman; Bir Uttom, psc (1936–1981)	25 August 1975	3 November 1975	70 days	Punjab Regiment
-	Khaled MosharrafBir Uttom, psc	Major General; Khaled Mosharraf; Bir Uttom, psc (1937–1975)	3 November 1975	7 November 1975 †	4 days	East Bengal Regiment
(3)	Ziaur RahmanBir Uttom, psc	Lieutenant General; Ziaur Rahman; Bir Uttom, psc (1936–1981)	7 November 1975	28 April 1978	2 years, 172 days	Punjab Regiment
4	Hussain Muhammad Ershadndc, psc	Lieutenant General; Hussain Muhammad Ershad ndc, psc (1930–2019)	29 April 1978	30 August 1986	8 years, 123 days	East Bengal Regiment
5	Atiqur RahmanG+	Lieutenant General; Atiqur Rahman; G+ (1931–2023)	31 August 1986	30 August 1990	3 years, 364 days	Regiment of Artillery
6	Nuruddin Khanpsc	Lieutenant General; Nuruddin Khan psc (born 1940)	31 August 1990	30 August 1994	3 years, 364 days	Corps of Engineers
7	Abu Saleh Mohammad Nasim Bir Bikrom, psc	Lieutenant General; Abu Saleh Mohammad Nasim; Bir Bikrom, psc (born 1943)	31 August 1994	19 May 1996	1 year, 262 days	East Bengal Regiment
8	Muhammad Mahbubur Rahmanpsc	Lieutenant General; Muhammad Mahbubur Rahman psc	27 May 1996	23 December 1997	1 year, 210 days	Corps of Engineers
9	Mustafizur RahmanBir Bikrom, ndc, psc, C	General; Mustafizur Rahman; Bir Bikrom, ndc, psc, C (1941–2008)	24 December 1997	23 December 2000	2 years, 365 days	Corps of Engineers
10	Mohammed Harun-Ar-RashidBir Protik, rcds, psc	Lieutenant General; Mohammed Harun-Ar-Rashid; Bir Protik, rcds, psc (1948–2025)	24 December 2000	15 June 2002	1 year, 173 days	East Bengal Regiment
11	Hasan Mashhud Chowdhuryawc, psc	Lieutenant General; Hasan Mashhud Chowdhury awc, psc (born 1948)	16 June 2002	15 June 2005	2 years, 364 days	Frontier Force Regiment
12	Moeen Uddin Ahmedndc, psc	General; Moeen Uddin Ahmed ndc, psc (born 1953)	16 June 2005	15 June 2009	3 years, 364 days	East Bengal Regiment
13	Mohammed Abdul Mubeenndc, psc	General; Mohammed Abdul Mubeen ndc, psc (born 1957)	16 June 2009	25 June 2012	3 years, 9 days	East Bengal Regiment
14	Iqbal Karim Bhuiyanpsc	General; Iqbal Karim Bhuiyan psc (born 1957)	26 June 2012	25 June 2015	2 years, 364 days	East Bengal Regiment
15	Abu Belal Muhammad Shafiul Haqndc, psc	General; Abu Belal Muhammad Shafiul Haq ndc, psc (born 1958)	26 June 2015	25 June 2018	2 years, 364 days	Armoured Corps
16	Aziz Ahmed SBP, BSP, BGBM, PBGM, BGBMS, psc, G	General; Aziz Ahmed; SBP, BSP, BGBM, PBGM, BGBMS, psc, G (born 1961)	25 June 2018	24 June 2021	2 years, 364 days	Regiment of Artillery
17	SM Shafiuddin AhmedSBP, OSP, ndu, psc, PhD	General; SM Shafiuddin Ahmed; SBP, OSP, ndu, psc, PhD (born 1963)	24 June 2021	23 June 2024	2 years, 365 days	East Bengal Regiment
18	Waker-Uz-ZamanSBP, OSP, SGP, psc	General; Waker-Uz-Zaman; SBP, OSP, SGP, psc (born 1966)	23 June 2024	Incumbent	2 years, 135 days	East Bengal Regiment

== See also ==
- Chief of Air Staff (Bangladesh)
- Chief of Naval Staff (Bangladesh)
- Chief of the General Staff (Bangladesh)
- Deputy Chief of Army Staff (Bangladesh)
- List of serving generals of the Bangladesh Army
- Lieutenant General (Bangladesh)
- Military ranks of Bangladesh
- Awards and decorations of the Bangladesh Armed Forces
