= Defence Services Command and Staff College (Bangladesh) =

Military training institution in Dhaka

- সামরিক বাহিনী কমান্ড ও স্টাফ কলেজ
- Seal of DSCSC
- Motto: Knowledge is power
- Type: staff college
- Established: 30 December 1977
- Affiliations: Bangladesh Armed Forces
- Commandant: Major General S. M. Asadul Haque
- Location: Mirpur, Dhaka, Bangladesh
- Website: dscsc.mil.bd

The Defence Services Command and Staff College (Bengali: সামরিক বাহিনী কমান্ড ও স্টাফ কলেজ) is a staff college of Bangladesh Armed Forces that provides training to Bangladeshi military officers. It is located in Mirpur, Dhaka, Bangladesh.

== History ==
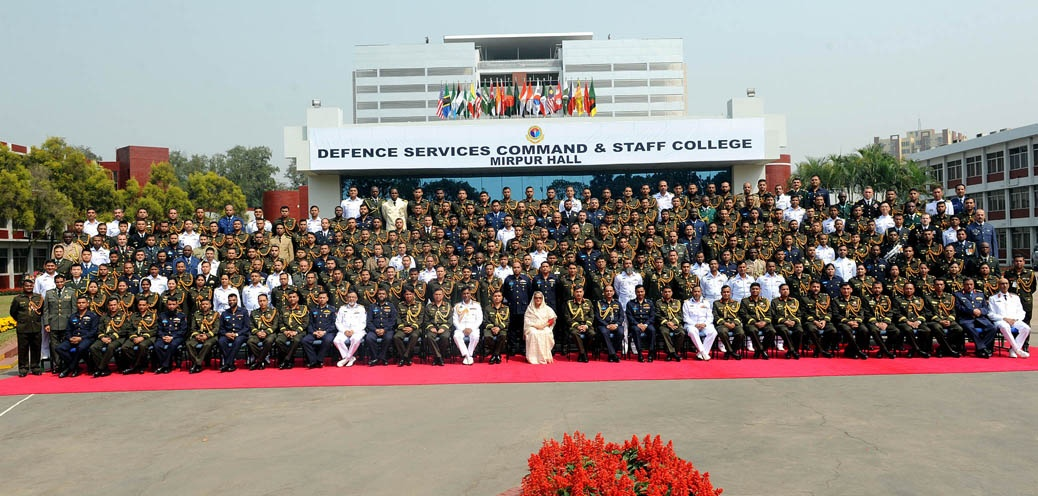
Prime Minister Sheikh Hasina meets Defence Services Command and Staff College graduates

The institute was established on 30 December 1977 with the support of British Military Advisory Team. The college is run by Bangladesh Armed forces. A British Military Advisory Team (BMAT) headed by a Chief Instructor, was the founding and driving force in running the training curriculum in the initial days of the college. The inaugural batch had 30 students from all the three services of Bangladesh Armed Forces and Bangladesh Police. The college ran short courses of six-month duration jointly for the three services for the first three years. In 1980, the course duration was increased to 10 months. That year, a separate Air Wing was also opened, and invitation to overseas students was started. Separate Naval Wing was opened in 1982.

Since 1977, the course strength has been more than quadrupled. So far, 5979 students have graduated from the college. This includes 1300+ overseas students around the world. Till now officers from 44 Countries have participated in the course in Bangladesh DSCSC.

== List of Commandants ==
Sl No.	Name	Term Start	Term End
1	Major General Muzammel Hussain	23 Sep 1977	18 July 1981
2	Major General Muhammad Abdul Latif	18 July 1981	29 June 1983
3	Major General ASM Nasim	29 June 1983	16 May 1984
4	Major General Abdul Mannaf	16 May 1984	22 Feb 1986
5	Major General Muhammad Abdus Samad	8 Mar 1987	6 Dec 1990
6	Major General KM Abdul Wahed	6 Dec 1990	25 Mar 1991
7	Major General Muhammad Mahbubur Rahman	28 Oct 1991	15 Aug 1993
8	Major General Mustafa Kamal Uddin	15 Aug 1993	21 May 1995
9	Major General Hasan Mashhud Chowdhury	22 May 1995	24 May 1996
10	Major General A M Mansur Ahmed	11 Aug 1996	16 Aug 2001
11	Major General Fazle Elahi Akbar	16 Aug 2001	23 May 2002
12	Major General ASM Nazrul Islam	28 Mar 2002	3 Feb 2005
13	Major General Rezaqul Haider	3 Feb 2005	30 June 2005
14	Major General Aminul Karim	10 Jul 2005	16 Jul 2006
15	Major General M A Mubeen	4 Jul 2006	20 Jul 2007
16	Major General Iqbal Karim Bhuiyan	24 Jul 2007	15 Mar 2009
17	Major General Md. Ashab Uddin	18 Mar 2009	25 Feb 2010
18	Major General Abu Belal Muhammad Shafiul Huq	10 May 2012	31 Dec 2012
19	Major General Muhammad Mahfuzur Rahman	13 Jan 2013	27 Aug 2013
20	Major General Sajjadul Haque	28 Aug 2013	3 May 2016
21	Major General Md Saiful Abedin	3 May 2016	19 Feb 2017
22	Major General AKM Abdullahil Baquee	3 Mar 2017	26 Aug 2018
23	Major General Md Enayet Ullah	26 Aug 2018	5 Mar 2020
24	Major General Md Akbar Hossain	5 Mar 2020	13 Jan 2021
25	Major General Jubayer Salehin	23 Jan 2021	16 Feb 2022
26	Major General Ibne Fazal Shayekhuzzaman	17 Feb 2022	30 Dec 2022
27	Major General Md Faizur Rahman	28 Feb 2023	14 Aug 2024
28	Major General Mohammad Asadullah Minhazul Alam	18 Aug 2024	23 Oct 2024
29	Major General Chowdhury Mohammad Azizul Haque Hazary	Nov 2024	11 June 2026
30	Major General S. M. Asadul Haque	15 July 2026	Incumbent

== See also ==
- National Defence College (Bangladesh)
- Bangladesh University of Professionals
