= Joint Interrogation Cell =

Secret interrogation cells in Bangladesh

Joint Interrogation Cell is a secret interrogation cell in Bangladesh. It is located inside Kochukhet of Dhaka Cantonment. Joint Interrogation Cell and Taskforce for Interrogation Cell are two main cells that torture detainees in Bangladesh.

There is another Joint Interrogation Cell at the headquarters of the Criminal Investigation Department where Lutfozzaman Babar was interrogated.

== History ==
The facilities for the Joint Interrogation Cell used during the Bangladesh Liberation War by Pakistan Army to torture suspects and closed after the Independence of Bangladesh.

Joint Interrogation Cell located inside Kochukhet of Dhaka Cantonment were first used in Independent Bangladesh by the Carataker Government led by Fakhruddin Ahmed and Chief of Amr Staff Moeen U Ahmed in 2007 and was continued by the Awami League government led by Prime Minister Sheikh Hasina since 2009. Another secret detention and interrogation facility, the Taskforce for Interrogation Cell, is located inside the headquarters of Rapid Action Battalion. Beside the Joint Interrogation Cell is the secret prison Aynaghor. Several British citizens have been detained at the cells.

In 2007, Tasneem Khalil was interrogated and tortured at the Joint Interrogation Cell after writing about extrajudicial killings in Bangladesh.

The Ministry of Home Affairs, under the Fakhruddin Ahmed led caretaker government, issued a statement on 8 August 2008 to the Human Rights Watch regarding their 2007 country report on Bangladesh. The statement denied allegations that the Directorate General of Forces Intelligence tortured Professor M. Anwar Hossain and journalist Tasneem Khalil said since it does not have its own interrogation facilities it used the Joint Interrogation Cell in cooperation with other security forces.

Brigadier General Abdur Rahim and Brigadier General Rezzakul Haider Chowdhury, former director generals of National Security Intelligence, were interrogated at the Joint Interrogation Cell about the 2004 arms and ammunition haul in Chittagong. They were later shifted to the Taskforce for Interrogation Cell.

In 2012, a parliamentary committee led by Rashed Khan Menon recommended to end Directorate General of Forces Intelligence in domestic politics and closing the interrogation cells of the unit. It blamed top security officials from the Army and Police for torture of academics from the University of Dhaka by the caretaker government.

In 2024, after the fall of the Sheikh Hasina led Awami League government, security forces destroyed this along with other secret detention centers.

== See also ==
- Human rights in Bangladesh
- Taskforce for Interrogation Cell
- Aynaghor
- Guest room (Bangladesh)

== Past detainees ==
- Tarique Rahman
- Obaidul Quader
- Sheikh Selim
- Hasinur Rahman
- Mufti Hannan
- Rezzakul Haider Chowdhury
- Abdur Rahim
- Muhammad Jasimuddin Rahmani
