= Taskforce for Interrogation Cell =

Special interrogation cells in Bangladesh

The Taskforce for Interrogation Cell (Bengali: জিজ্ঞাসাবাদের জন্য টাস্কফোর্স), also known as TFI Cell, is a Bangladesh government special interrogation cell operated by Bangladesh's intelligence forces (Directorate General of Forces Intelligence) and special police units (Rapid Action Battalion). It is located inside Rapid Action Battalion headquarters in Uttara, Dhaka. The Guardian described it as Bangladesh's most notorious torture cell. The other interrogation cell is called the Joint Interrogation Cell.

== History ==
According to The Guardian, the Taskforce for Interrogation Cell uses various forms of torture to interrogate suspects, including British citizens suspected of being terrorists. The task force has coordinated interrogation activities with MI5 and MI6 of Britain when interrogating British-Bangladeshi suspects.

During the 2006–2008 Bangladeshi political crisis, the Taskforce for Interrogation Cell provided information on corruption by politicians to Bangladeshi news organisations, such as The Daily Star. The editor of The Daily Star expressed regret over using information provided by the cell.

Brigadier General (retired) Abdur Rahim, former director general of National Security Intelligence, was interrogated at the Taskforce for Interrogation Cell after his arrest in the 2004 arms and ammunition haul in Chittagong case in 2009.

In 2012, a special committee of the Parliament of Bangladesh recommended the closure of the Taskforce for Interrogation Cell and recommended restricting the involvement of the Directorate General of Forces Intelligence in national politics.

In August 2024, after the fall of the Sheikh Hasina-led Awami League government, security forces destroyed this along with other secret detention centers.

=== Temporary branch ===
After the Bangladesh Rifles mutiny in February 2009, a temporary Taskforce for Interrogation Cell was established inside the headquarters of Bangladesh Rifles in Pilkhana, Dhaka. It was closed down in January 2010 following allegations of torture under the supervision of a government committee. The committee was led by Additional Secretary Md Ghulam Hussain of the Ministry of Home Affairs. Its members were Additional Inspector General Shah Jamal Raj, chief of the Criminal Investigation Department, and Major General Md Mainul Islam, director general of the Bangladesh Rifles. During interrogation, 67 mutineers died in custody. The bodies of some of the dead soldiers showed signs of torture.

== See also ==
- Guest room (Bangladesh)
- Aynaghar
- Joint Interrogation Cell
- Human rights in Bangladesh
- Directorate General of Forces Intelligence
