= Abdullahil Amaan Azmi =

Bangladeshi retired Army general

Lieutenant General Abdullahil Amaan Al Azmi
- আব্দুল্লাহিল আমান আযমি
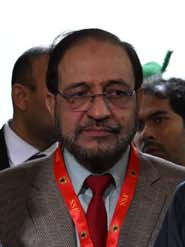
- Azmi in 2025
- Born: 27 December 1958 (age 67); Mia Shaheb Moidan, East Pakistan, Pakistan
- Education: Government Laboratory High School; Notre Dame College; Bangladesh Military Academy
- Relatives: Ghulam Azam (father)
- Military career
- Allegiance: Bangladesh
- Branch: Bangladesh Army
- Service years: 1981–2009
- Rank: Lieutenant General (Brevet)
- Unit: East Bengal Regiment
- Commands: Commander of 69th Infantry Brigade; Station Commander, Ghatail; Commandant of School of Military Intelligence
- Awards: Sword of Honour (BMA)

Abdullahil Amaan Azmi (Bengali: আবদুল্লাহিল আমান আযমী) is a Bangladeshi retired military officer and human rights and political activist. He was subjected to enforced disappearance in 2016 and was held captive in Aynaghar, a secret detention center operated by the Directorate General of Forces Intelligence. On August 7, 2024, he was released from Aynaghar following the resignation of Sheikh Hasina.

== Early life and education ==
Azmi was born in 1958 at the Shah Shaheb Bari lodge, a Sufi lodge in the nucleus of Old Dacca of then East Pakistan, Pakistan (now Dhaka Division, Bangladesh). He is the eldest son of Ghulam Azam, the former Ameer of Bangladesh Jamaat-e-Islami. Azmi finished elementary school at Government Laboratory High School and high school at Notre Dame College. Azmi was enlisted in the Bangladesh Military Academy in 1979. He was awarded the sword of honour for his enormous confidential records as the top officer's cadet of the 5th BMA long course. His parent unit was the 14th East Bengal Regiment.

== Military career ==
Azmi taught at the East Bengal Regimental Centre, School of Infantry and Tactics, and the Defence Services Command and Staff College. He commanded two infantry companies under the 2nd and 11th East Bengal Regiments, one infantry battalion, the 18th East Bengal Regiment, and one infantry brigade at Bandarban Cantonment. He was also the former station commander of Ghatail and commandant of the School of Military Intelligence at Cumilla Cantonment. In 2009, Azmi was summarily dismissed from the army by the second Hasina ministry without a pension and without any explanation. He had the rank of brigadier general at the time of his dismissal. Azmi's list on dismissal was withdrawn by the Yunus administration and furthermore, given a proper retirement on 26 December 2024. He was furthermore given retrospective facilities by the army on 16 February 2026 along with several other officers during the premiership of Sheikh Hasina and was promoted to brevet lieutenant general.

== Disappearance and release ==
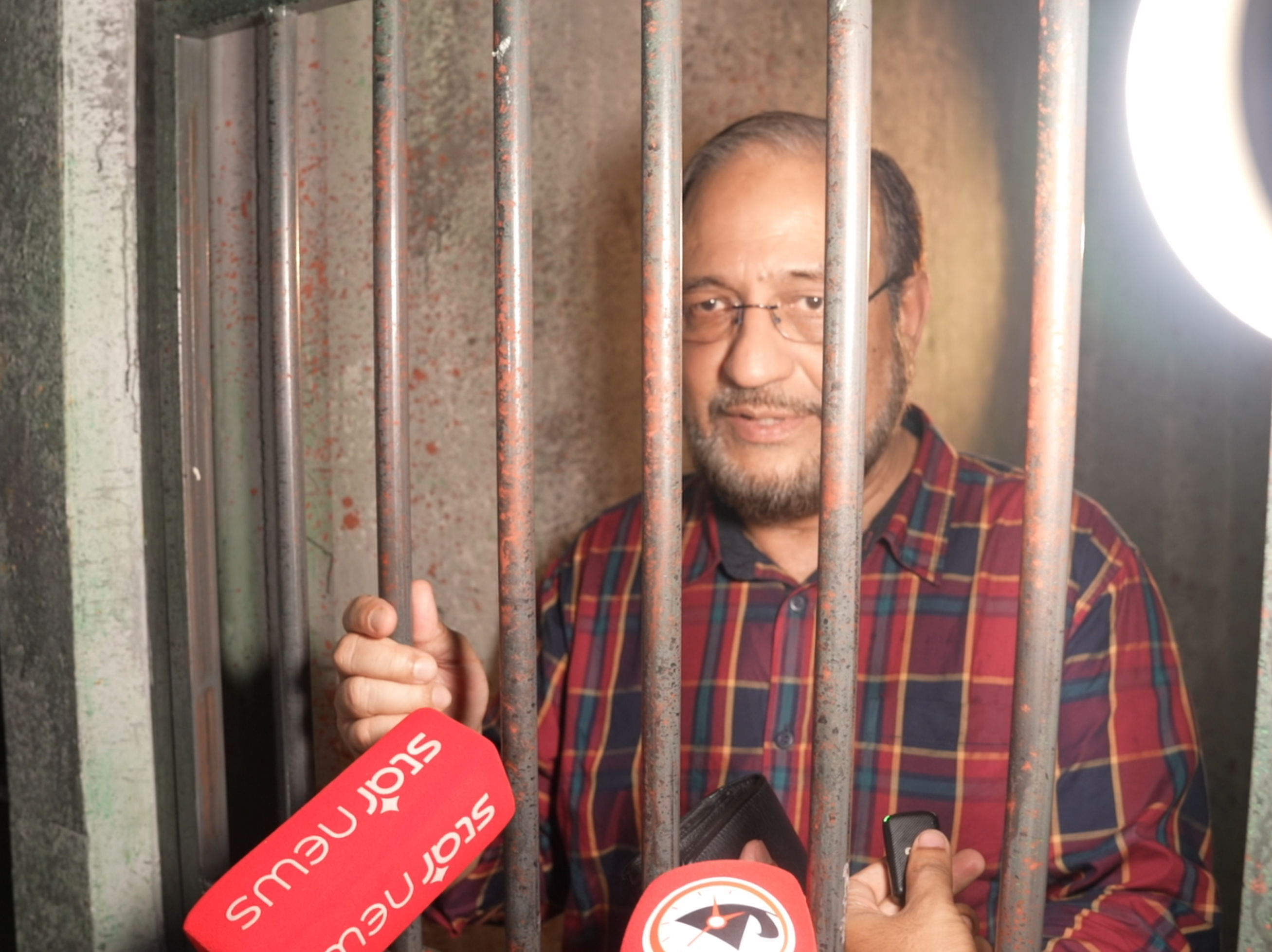
Azmi demonstrating his illicit sentence in Aynaghar in December 2024

Azmi was detained by plainclothes officers of Bangladesh Police on 24 August 2016 from his home in Moghbazar, Dhaka, Bangladesh. Around the same time, two other sons of opposition leaders were detained, Hummam Quader Chowdhury, son of Salauddin Quader Chowdhury, and Mir Ahmad Bin Quasem, son of Mir Quasem Ali. Azmi's father died in 2014 while in jail after being convicted for war crimes in the Bangladesh Liberation War. In March 2017, Hummam Quader Chowdhury was released, and he could not say who had detained him.

In 2022, an investigation by the Swedish-based news network Netra News revealed that Azmi was being held at Aynaghar, a secret prison run by the Directorate General of Forces Intelligence.

=== Release ===
Azmi was released from Aynaghar on 6 August 2024, the day after Prime Minister Sheikh Hasina resigned and fled Bangladesh following popular protests. After being admitted into a hospital for better treatment, he said, "How long have I not seen the light and air, I have not seen the world of Allah, I have not been allowed to hear the call to prayer. The amount of tears that I have wiped on this towel, if collected, a lake could have been made."

== Views and activism ==
Azmi is notable for his anti-Indian stance. On 12 November 2012, Azmi testified as a defence witness in the trial of his father, Ghulam Azam, International Crimes Tribunal-1. He was the lone defence witness at the trial. On 23 October 2014, Azam died at the Bangabandhu Sheikh Mujibur Rahman Medical University. Azmi expressed dismay with the Bangladesh Nationalist Party for not speaking about the death of his father. In 2015, Azmi controversially challenged the number of Indian soldiers killed in the Bangladesh Liberation War following a Facebook post by journalist Anjan Roy. He also questioned the number of Bangladeshi citizens killed in the Bangladesh genocide. There have been claims that the unit of "lakh" was mistranslated to a million, increasing the claimed deaths tenfold. This triggered criticism from Bangladesh civil society members and media.

In September 2024, Azmi proposed the change of the national anthem and constitution. He further proposed to assemble a national committee that will prevent passing laws contradictory to Islam. He critiqued the 3 million death toll figure during the 1971 Liberation War, saying a census was carried out where the death toll was 286,000.

== See also ==
- Forced disappearance
- Forced disappearance in Bangladesh
- Mir Ahmad Bin Quasem
- Bangladesh Army
