= Hawa Bhaban =

Office of the chair of the Bangladesh Nationalist Party

Coordinates: 23.7920°N 90.4046°E

Hawa Bhaban was the political office of the chairperson of the Bangladesh Nationalist Party (BNP), and monitored party affairs on the chair's behalf. It was viewed as an "alternate power house" in Bangladesh when BNP was in power from 2001 to 2006. It became controversial during the 2006–2008 Bangladeshi political crisis when the party joint secretary was Tarique Rahman, son and heir apparent of the chairperson of the Bangladesh Nationalist Party Khaleda Zia. This resulted in a parallel government being administered from Hawa Bhaban.

The Hawa Bhaban has allegedly been used to plot the 2004 Dhaka grenade attack in an attempt to kill Sheikh Hasina, former Prime Minister and chairperson of the Awami League. It was a symbol of kleptocracy in Bangladesh during the rule of the Bangladesh Nationalist Party—led coalition government from 2001 to 2006. Businessman Giasuddin Al Mamun, convicted in a corruption case and friend of Tarique Rahman, was connected to the Hawa Bhaban. Tarique Rahman would be called the 'prince' of Hawa Bhaban. Harris Chowdhury had access to both Hawa Bhaban and as political secretary of Prime Minister Khaleda Zia to the Prime Minister's Office.

Accused of the 2004 arms and ammunition haul in Chittagong claimed Hawa Bhaban was connected to the incident during trial.

== History ==
Located on Road 13 of Banani, Dhaka, Hawa Bhaban was rented in 2000 as the political office of the chairperson of the Bangladesh Nationalist Party Khaleda Zia. The plan was to establish a research and training center for the Bangladesh Nationalist Party. Tarique Rahman, son of Khaleda Zia, started using it as his office. It was a two-storey building and his office was located on the first floor. He would host academics, ambassadors, journalists, and political thinkers here. It became a well frequented building during the Bangladesh Nationalist Party rule and was used by Giasuddin Al Mamun to make money from business deals. Fuad Hasan was promoted to Chief News Editor of Bangladesh Television through his links to Hawa Bhaban.

Harris Chowdhury was deputed from the Bangladesh Nationalist Party to Hawa Bhaban. Bangladesh Civil Service Officers from the 1973 batch who had been blacklisted for allegedly supporting the 1996 Janatar Mancha had to provide bribes to Harris Chowdhury for promotions or reinstatements. He took bribes from Harbin Electric, Obaidul Karim, and Lahmayer International Palli Power Company for government contracts. Portions of those bribes would go to Hawa Bhaban. Cadogan Manning was given a contract for a Meghnaghat phase three 450 megawatt power project through the support of Hawa Bhaban; it was cancelled in 2007.

Niko Resources, a Canadian Company, used connections with Hawa Bhaban to secure gas exploration contracts in Bangladesh. Mahbubey Alam, Attorney General of Bangladesh claimed FBI and the Royal Canadian Mounted Police had found evidence of this corruption which was denied by AM Mahbub Uddin Khokon, lawyer of Khaleda Zia. Niko had paid US$10 thousand to Giasuddin Al Mamun for deal with Bangladesh Petroleum Exploration & Production Company Limited. SR Osmani was removed from the post of the chairman of PetroBangla after lobbying by businessmen associated with Hawa Bhaban.

In August 2004, Lutfozzaman Babar, Minister of Home Affairs, Abdus Salam Pintu, Deputy Minister, Harris Chowdhury, political secretary to Prime Minister Khaleda Zia, one fugitive assassin of Sheikh Mujibur Rahman met with leaders of Harkat-ul-Jihad-al-Islami Bangladesh, Al Markajul Islami, and Bangladesh Jamaat-e-Islami in Hawa Bhaban to finalize a plan to assassinate former Prime Minister Sheikh Hasina in the 2004 Dhaka grenade attack. Sajeeb Wazed Joy would later claim it was Tarique Rahman who approved the plan. Brigadier General Abdur Rahim, director general of National Security Intelligence, visited Hawa Bhaban before the attack. Brigadier General Rezzaqul Haider Chowdhury, Ali Ahsan Mohammad Mojaheed, and Maulana Tajuddin, brother of Abdus Salam Pintu, attended the meetings at Hawa Bhaban.

Bangladesh Police blocked out areas of Banani to protect Hawa Bhaban on 13 road of block-D Banani after Awami League announced a seize of the office on 21 April 2004. Tarique Rahman played cricket on a field near the Hawa Bhaban and said to the media "I played cricket, my team won, so I'm happy with today,". The Daily Star called Giasuddin Al Mamun second in command of Hawa Bhaban in a report after an attack on his residence in Gazipur in the aftermath of the bomb attack killing Ahsanullah Master. He denied any connections to Hawa Bhaban despite being present in high level events at the Hawa Bhaban.

The Police superintendent of Rajshahi District, Masud Miah, protected Jamaat-ul-Mujahideen Bangladesh and its leader, Bangla Bhai. He had close connections with Hawa Bhaban which allowed him to disregard Deputy Inspector General of Police Rajshahi Division who did not like the ties between the police and Jamaat-ul-Mujahideen Bangladesh. Bangladesh Nationalist Party politicians Ruhul Kuddus Talukder Dulu, close to Hawa Bhaban, Aminul Haque, and Nadim Mostofa used Jamaat-ul-Mujahideen Bangladesh to target the Proletarian Party of East Bengal. Bangla Bhai would visit Hawa Bhaban.

In May 2006, Awami League raised the question of corruption centering Hawa Bhaban in the national parliament.

On 7 March 2007, joint forces during the Fakruddin Ahmed caretaker government arrested Tarique Rahman and raided Hawa Bhaban. They closed two rooms used by Tareq Rahman and since then there had been no activities at the building. The forces had seized CDs, and documents from Hawa Bhaban. Bangladesh Nationalist Party leaders close to Hawa Bhaban like Ashik Islam, Azizul Bari Helal, Barkat Ullah Bulu, and Zahir Uddin Swapan went into hiding or fled the country. Lutfozzaman Babar disclosed to the Task Force for Interrogation that Khaleda Zia got angry at a meeting in Hawa Bhaban where he and Mohammad Mosaddak Ali Falu suggested Tarique Rahman should flew the country. They had suggested this before his arrest based on information they had received from different sources.

In September 2008, Bangladesh Nationalist Party announced plans to close Hawa Bhaban without any definite dates. The owner of the house Asheq Ahmed, had been trying to reclaim it. He said he will ignore the 1.5 million BDT pending rent if they vacate the house soon. The building was under the name of Hawarun Ahmad, wife of Asheq Ahmed. Mohammad Kamaruddin, a leader of the British Unit of Bangladesh Nationalist Party, wanted to buy the house as a gift for Khaleda Zia but the deal fell through after it was leaked to the media. R. A. Ghani, Bangladesh Nationalist Party politician, said Hawa Bhaban should have been better controlled but praised its date collection on constituencies and representatives.

The 6th House on Road 86 in Gulshan-2 was selected as the new office of Bangladesh Nationalist Party chairperson Khaleda Zia in 2008. Chowdhury Tanbir Ahmed Siddiky, Bangladesh Nationalist Party leader, called for publishing a white paper on corruption in Hawa Bhaban.

== Legacy ==
Mahfuz Anam, editor of The Daily Star, claimed Hawa Bhaban had destroyed the Bangladesh Nationalist Party government.

Asheq Ahmed, the owner of the house at 53 Road 13, Block D, Banani, had it demolished and built a nine-storey apartment building in its place.

In April 2013, Tarique Rahman met with individuals affiliated with Hawa Bhaban, Ashik Islam, Akhtar Ahmed Belayet, Dr Aman, Mia Nuruddin Ahmed Apu, and Sajjadul Siraj Talukder Joy in Saudi Arabia.

ABM Mohiuddin Chowdhury, former mayor of Chittagong, called Tarique Rahman villain of Hawa Bhaban and called for his trial in 2014 over the 2004 grenade attacks. Sheikh Hasina alleged in 2017 intelligence agents from a neighboring country would visit Hawa Bhaban.

Rapid Action Battalion detained one individual linked to Hawa Bhaban in 2018 and said they were financing violence centering the election in Bangladesh.

In October 2022, Prime Minister Sheikh Hasina told businessmen to work for Bangladesh as they do not have to share profits with Hawa Bhaban. Obaidul Quader, general secretary of the Awami League, referred to it as the birthplace of casinos in Bangladesh in September 2019 and in 2022 said Bangladesh Nationalist Party wanted to return Hawa Bhaban. It was criticised by Sajeeb Wazed Joy, son of Sheikh Hasina.

In August 2024, Giasuddin Al Mamun was freed next day after the resignation of Sheikh Hasina and the fall of the Awami League government.
