= M. Maroof Zaman =

Bangladeshi diplomat

- এম মারুফ জামান

Ambassador of Bangladesh to Qatar
- In office 29 November 2004 – 28 November 2008
- Preceded by: Ahsan N. Amin
- Succeeded by: Md Shahdat Hossain

Ambassador of Bangladesh to Vietnam
- Military career
- Branch: Bangladesh Army
- Service years: 1978–1982
- Rank: Captain
- Unit: Corps of Signals

M Maroof Zaman is a former Bangladeshi diplomat who served as the ambassador of Bangladesh to Qatar and Vietnam. He was subjected to enforced disappearance and is said to have been held captive in the 'Aynaghar' clandestine detention centre.

== Career ==
Zaman was commissioned into the Bangladesh Army in 1977 through the 6th Short Course and served in the Signal Corps, retiring with the rank of captain for health reasons. He transitioned to the Ministry of Foreign Affairs in 1982 and later held key diplomatic positions, including minister at the Bangladesh High Commission in the UK and ambassador to Vietnam. As director general in the Foreign Ministry, he oversaw relations with West Asia, Central Asia, and Africa, before being appointed as Bangladesh's Ambassador to Qatar in 2004.

Zaman was sent into forced retirement in August 2013 along with Mohammed Hasib Aziz and Ashraf Uddin.

=== Forced disappearance ===
On December 4, 2017, Zaman disappeared while on his way to the airport to pick up his daughter. Shortly after, he contacted his home from an unknown number, instructing his staff to hand over his laptop to several men who would visit the house. Three men, described as well-built and masked, arrived and conducted a thorough search, taking his spare cellphone, camera, and laptop. Zaman's car was later found abandoned in Khilkhet, and his phone was switched off.

Following his disappearance, Zaman's daughter, Samiha Zaman, filed a General Diary with the Bangladesh Police and campaigned with Mayer Daak, an organization representing families of enforced disappearance victims in Bangladesh. Several former Bangladeshi ambassadors also expressed concern over his disappearance.

After being missing for 467 days, Zaman returned home on March 16, 2019. Kazi Reazul Hoque, chairperson of the National Human Rights Commission, welcomed his return and called for accountability. Zaman's family confirmed his return but declined to provide further details, requesting privacy. A 2022 whistleblower investigation by the Sweden-based news portal Netra News suggested that Zaman had been secretly detained at 'Aynaghar', a clandestine facility operated by the Directorate General of Forces Intelligence.

== See also ==
- List of solved missing person cases (post-2000)
