= Extrajudicial killings and enforced disappearances in Bangladesh =

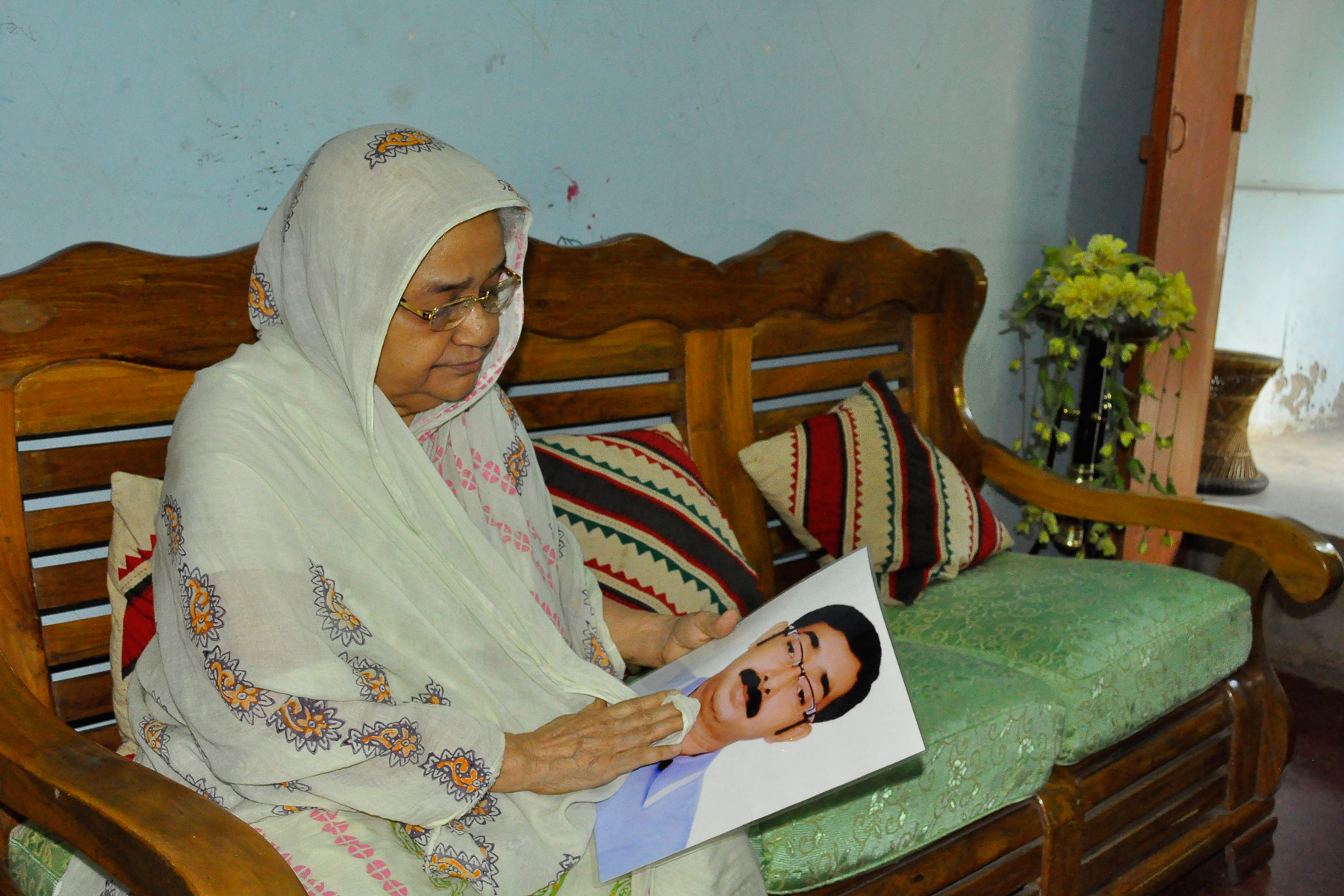
Mother of Sajedul Islam Sumon holding his picture in 2013

Extrajudicial killings and enforced disappearances in Bangladesh refer to extrajudicial executions carried out by law enforcement agencies without due legal process and to abduction cases in which the government directly or indirectly kidnaps people and holds them incommunicado. From 2009 to 2023, at least 2,699 people were victims of extrajudicial killings in the 160-million-strong Bangladesh. During the period, 677 people were forcibly disappeared, and 1,048 people died in custody. From 2004 to 2006, at least 991 people were killed extrajudicially by "death squad" the Rapid Action Battalion (RAB). The practice of extrajudicial killings and enforced disappearances primarily involves law enforcement agencies such as the RAB and the Detective Branch (DB) of the police.

These practices began during the administration of Sheikh Mujibur Rahman and continued through subsequent regimes, including those of General Ershad and the government of the Bangladesh Nationalist Party. During its tenure from 2009 to 2024, the Awami League government has been particularly noted for using such tactics to control dissent, even during the COVID-19 pandemic.

The United Nations and human rights groups, including Human Rights Watch and Amnesty International, repeatedly appeal to the government to stop these human rights violations, but to no avail. In 2021, the United States imposed sanctions on the RAB and its seven high officials. Since the imposition of the US sanctions, the number of extrajudicial killings and enforced disappearances has begun decreasing.

In 2016, the families of the victims of enforced disappearance in Bangladesh founded a platform Mayer Daak to press their demand to know the whereabouts of their loved ones who disappeared under mysterious situation. On 14 August 2022, Netra News, which was then blocked in Bangladesh, published a whistleblower report alleging that Bangladesh officials were holding and torturing victims of enforced disappearances at Aynaghar, a secret detention facility.

After the downfall of the Awami league government in a mass uprising on 5 August 2024, the interim government led by Muhammad Yunus formed a five-member inquiry commission on 27 August 2024, to investigate extrajudicial killings and enforced disappearances. Headed by a retired high court judge, the commission was tasked with investigating the activities of the police, the RAB, the Border Guard Bangladesh (BGB), the Criminal Investigation Department (CID), the Special Branch (SB), the National Security Intelligence (NSI) and the military's Directorate General of Forces Intelligence (DGFI).

On 29 August 2024, the interim government also signed the instrument of accession to the International Convention for the Protection of All Persons from Enforced Disappearance, aiming at preventing enforced disappearances as a state party.

== Background ==
It first occurred after the independence of Bangladesh in 1971, under Sheikh Mujibur Rahman's administration between 1972 and 1975. Many members of Jatiya Samajtantrik Dal, army officers and other opposition party members were picked up by Jatiya Rakkhi Bahini, an elite para-military force formed by Sheikh Mujibur Rahman. It has continued since then and through the formation of Rapid Action Battalion. Sheikh Hasina is the daughter of Sheikh Mujibur Rahman. Since then, during her regime, around 402 people have been forcefully disappeared by the state security forces.

After the Awami League party assumed power in the country through election in 2009, law and order situation began to deteriorate with opposition men being attacked by the ruling party men that left several opposition men killed and many others injured. Armed conflicts and violence erupted in the university campuses throughout the country. Political activities of the opposition parties were often attacked. From 2010, picking up of opposition leaders and activists by the state security forces began to surge in the country.

== Pre-election period of 2013 ==
Throughout most of 2013, Bangladesh Nationalist Party (BNP) and its alliance observed nationwide general strikes and blockades in demand of a non-partisan interim government or a caretaker government to hold the next general election of 2014. The E.U., the U.S. and the Commonwealth announced that they would not send observers since they were concerned about the credibility of the election. Before the controversial national election of 2014, 20 opposition men were picked up by security forces. As of 2016, they remained missing.

From 2014 to July 2019, 344 people were victims of forced disappearance in Bangladesh. 40 of them were found dead, 66 were found under arrest in government custody and 203 still remain missing according to Ain o Salish Kendra. Those who have reappeared remained silent about the period they were missing.

== Notable cases of enforced disappearances ==
=== Mizanur Rahman Tutul ===
On 27 July 2008, physician and political activist Mizanur Rahman Tutul was shot dead by police officers in an act of extrajudicial killing. Tutul was a high-ranking member of the banned Purbo Banglar Communist Party, and led the Lal Pataka (Red Flag) faction.

=== M Ilias Ali ===
On 17 April 2012, M. Ilias Ali, was a former Member of Parliament and prominent leader of the main opposition party BNP, went missing after last being seen in Banani, Dhaka at midnight with his driver. His private car was found abandoned near his Dhaka home. In the following days, five of his party men died and many were injured as they observed strikes and demonstration programs in protest of the disappearance. The incident got much media coverage.

=== Aminul Islam ===
Aminul Islam, a Bangladeshi trade unionist, was a member of Bangladesh Garment & Industrial Workers Federation and an organizer for the Bangladesh Center of Worker Solidarity. On 5 April 2012, Islam's dead body was found near Dhaka after being disappeared earlier. The body bore marks of torture. His disappearance and murder sparked much international criticism.

=== Amaan Azmi, Mir Ahmad and Hummam Chowdhury ===
In August 2016, sons of three opposition leaders were picked up by Bangladesh security forces and were taken to unknown places. The victims were a former brigadier-general of the Bangladesh Army Abdullahil Amaan Azmi, son of Ghulam Azam; Hummam Quader Chowdhury, son of Salauddin Quader Chowdhury; and Mir Ahmad Bin Quasem, son of Mir Quasem Ali. Amaan Azmi was forcedly picked up from his residence in front of his family members. In all three cases, there were multiple witnesses, but the state police denied their involvements in the abductions. Later, the United Nations expressed concern over the abductions of three men, and urged the Sheikh Hasina's government to check the increasing number of cases of forced disappearances in the country. Hummam Quader Chowdhury returned home in March 2017 and reported that he could not "remember" who detained him. In August 2024, Amaan Azmi and Mir Ahmad were released from Aynaghor after the fall of Sheikh Hasina´s regime.

=== Sukharanjan Bali ===
A prosecution witness who was abducted allegedly by plainclothed police on 5 November 2012 from the gate of Supreme Court after he had decided to testify in favour of an accused war criminal Delawar Hossain Sayedee, who at the time was being tried before the International Crimes Tribunal, Bangladesh. He was later traced to Kolkata's Dumdum prison.

=== Mir Ahmad Bin Quasem ===
Mir Ahmad Bin Quasem was a victim of enforced disappearance and was believed to have been abducted by security forces of the government of Bangladesh. He is the son of late Mir Quasem Ali, a prominent leader of the opposition Bangladesh Jamaat-e-Islami, and was a member of his father's legal defence team before his abduction.

Mir Ahmad was reportedly snatched from in front of his family members at his house in Mirpur, Dhaka during the night on 9 August 2016. Mir Ahmad was released on 6 August 2024, the very next day after Sheikh Hasina resigned and fled Bangladesh following popular protests. Pictures shared on social media by family members showed him embracing his mother and two daughters.

== Other cases ==
=== 2008 ===
- Tushar Islam Tipu: Abducted on 22 July 2008 by Rapid Action Battalion, Tipu's family sought help from home ministry of Bangladesh who later issued a letter to authorities in November 2012 to carry out the investigation. But there was no progress on the investigation on his whereabouts.

=== 2011 ===
- Habibul Hawlader: A fisherman from Morelganj in Bagerhat was abducted on 6 June 2011.
- KM Shamim Akhter: Former vice-president of Bangladesh Chhatra Union, a student wing of Bangladesh communist party was abducted on 29 September 2011. He was picked from his home at Purana Paltan area.

=== 2012 ===
- Waliullah and Muqaddas: On 5 February 2012 approximately at 1.00 a.m. Al Mukaddas (22), fourth-year student of the Department of Al Fiqah and Mohammad Waliullah (23), a Masters candidate of Dawah and Islamic Studies Department of Islamic University, Bangladesh were allegedly arrested and disappeared by some persons who identified themselves as RAB-4 and DB Police members from Savar. Both were members of the Islamic student organization Bangladesh Islami Chhatra Shibir. Amnesty International along with other rights organizations expressed their concern over this issue and called for urgent action.
- Dinar: Dinar was the General Secretary of Chhatra Dal of Sylhet district. He was picked up in March 2012.
- Juned: He was friend of Dinar and Sylhet Chhatra Dal member. He was picked up along with Dinar.
- Mohammad Imam Hassan: Son of a street hawker. He was kidnapped in 2012 and was rescued the next day by Bangladesh's Rapid Action Battalion but the paramilitary force still has not freed the man.

=== 2013 ===
- Nizam Uddin Munna: He was picked up from his house in 2013. His father alleged that Rapid Action Battelion picked his son.
- Khalid Hasan Sohel: Khali Hasan Sohel was the president of Bangladesh Nationalist Party's student wing, Chhatra Dal of Dhaka ward 89. He was picked up by law enforcement agencies in 2013.
- Mofizul Islam Rashed: Leader of Chhatra Dal, a student wing of Bangladesh Nationalists Party was picked up in front of Diamond Garment on Mirpur Mazar Road in April 2013. His family says people who picked him up were dressed like members of Detective Branch (DB) police.
- Jakir Hossain: Jakir Hossain was picked up by Rapid Action Battalion (RAB)-2 from his residence at the capital's Adabar thana on 2 April 2013 at midnight. He was a member of Bangladesh Islami Chhatrashibir and acting president of the Adabar thana unit under Dhaka City West branch. He was student of a Dental Institute in Dhaka.
- Mohammad Anwarul Islam: On 5 April 2013 at around 2:25am, members of Rapid Action Battalion-5 arrested Mr. Mohammad Anwarul Islam and Mosammat Nurjahan Begum of Angariapara village in Chapainawabganj from house number 175 of Bil-Shimla Moholla under Rajpara Police Station in Rajshahi district. Later, when family members contacted the RAB-5 office, RAB notified that Anwarul had never been arrested by them. An allegation of enforced disappearance was brought against the members of RAB by Anwarul's family members. Upon inquiry, it was found that Anwarul was a last year Master's student of Mathematics department of Rajshahi College. Moreover, he was the Office Secretary of the Islami Chattra Shibir of Rajshahi district.
- Zahirul Islam Bhuiyan Parvez, Narayanganj district Jubo League publicity secretary, was picked up from Gulshan by members of Detective Branch on 6 July 2013 and never seen again.
- Khaled Hasan Sohel: Sohel was the president of BNP local unit in Sutrapur, Old Dhaka. He was picked up when he went to Dhaka Central Jail to meet his friends who were imprisoned on 28 November 2013.
- Abdul Quader Bhuiyan Masum: He was abducted on 4 December 2013. Abdul Quader Bhuiyan Masum was studying in final year in Government of Titumir College and was preparing to get into National Security Intelligence.
- Sajedul Islam Sumon and 7 others: He was picked up by Rapid Action Battalion on 4 December 2013 while he was spending time with six of his friends in Bashundhara residential area. A witness said that around 15 RAB member picked him up along with six of his friends around 8:00 PM. Sajedul was the general secretary of Bangladesh Nationalist party of ward-38 of Dhaka city unit. Six of friends were Zahidul Karim Tanvir, Mazharul Islam Russel, Abdul Quader Bhuiyan Masum, Asaduzzaman Rana, Al Amin, Adnan Chowdhury and Kawsar Ahmed.
- Adnan Chowdhury: Adnan along with his companion, Kawsar were picked up by law enforcement agencies from their houses in Shaheenbagh on 4 December 2013. Adnan's family described that seven to eight people entered their house and took away their son saying that they need Adnan for interrogation. There were two vehicles outside of their house, one of which had the RAB logo on it as witnessed by his family.
- Kawsar Hossain: Kawsar who worked as a private car driver went missing on 4 December 2013. He was abducted by members of Rapid Action Battalion at midnight from his residence.
- Parvez Hossain: Leader of Jatiyatabadi Chhatra Dal, a student wing of Bangladesh Nationalists party was abducted in December 2013 and have been missing since then.
- Selim Reza Mintu: Abducted in 2013, he was a businessman by profession. He was involved with politics of Bangladesh Nationalist Party's student wing. As witnessed by his family, Mintu was abducted around 1:30 am on 11 December 2013 by group seven to eight people who identified themselves as administrators.

=== 2014 ===
- Kazi Rakibul Hasan Shaon: Kazi Rakibul Hasan Shaon is son of Kazi Abdul Matin, who fought against Pakistan in Bangladesh Liberation War and also was the body guard of Bangladesh's father of the nation, Sheikh Mujibur Rahman. He went missing on 24 March 2014. Exact date is not known. He was the organizing secretary of Awami League's student wing, Chhatra League of Comilla Victoria College unit.
- Nazrul Islam: Teacher of Joypurhat Talimul Islam School and College was abducted on 11 April 2014.
- Shahnoor Alam: Shahnoor Alam, a trader from Brahmanbaria district was picked up by Rapid Action Battalion 14 on 29 April 2014 from his home in Nabinagar. He was tortured by Rapid Action Battalion and later died of wound in Comilla District Jail on 6 May few days later. Mehedi, younger brother of Alam, on 1 June filed a case with Magistrate Nazmun Nahar's court in Brahmanbaria. The court ordered the police to probe the case, but the magistrate was withdrawn the following day.

=== 2015 ===
- Anisur Rahman Talukder Khokon: Former organizing secretary of Chhatra Dal, was picked up by law enforcers from his home in Adabar area on 5 March 2015. He was later found under police custody in Faridpur.
- Mozahar Hossain Kantu: He was abducted from his home in March 2015. Mozahar was the leader of Awami league in Satkhira and an ex former assistant public prosecutor. He was abducted after he accused a newly elected upazila chairman, Sheikh Waheduzzaman of vote rigging.

=== 2016 ===
- Tanvir Hasan Zoha: When the news of Bangladesh Bank heist hit the local media in March 2016, Tanvir Ahmed Zoha, an IT specialist in an interview to Bangla Tribune said that transfer of $81M from Bangladesh Bank to the Philippines occurred because of involvement from someone inside Bangladesh Bank. After his comment on Bangladesh Bank, he went missing the next day on 16 March 2016. He and his friend were abducted by unknown people who picked them up in a microbus when Zoha and his friend were returning home by CNG auto rickshaw. He was found after six days of disappearance.
- Mizanur Rahman Sohag: Mizanur Rahman Sohag, a friend of murdered Sohagi Jahan Tonu's brother Anwar Hossain went missing on 28 March 2016. His family claimed that he was picked by unknown person who identified themselves as members of law enforcement agencies. He was found after 16 days of disappearance by his paternal uncle near his home.
- Abduction of three siblings: Three brothers Tikkah Sardar, Ershad Miah and Saddam Hossain were abducted from their home in Pabna on 11 May 2016. 10 to 12 armed men claiming themselves as members of Rapid Action Battalion entered their house and picked them up as witnessed by Abdul Karim, father of three siblings who went missing.
- Muhammed Iqbal Mahmud: A medical officer of Health Services in Bangladesh. He was abducted by plain clothed men to a microbus on 15 October 2016 from Science Laboratory intersection in Dhaka. CCTV footage of the incident went on viral where a police van was seen following the microbus.

=== 2017 ===
- Ishrak Ahmed Fahim: On 29 August 2017, Fahim, 19-year-old student at McGill University disappeared from Dhaka while returning home from Star Kabab in Dhanmondi.
- M Maroof Zaman: On 4 December 2017, Ambassador Zaman disappeared on his way to the airport. He returned home 467 days later.

=== 2018 ===
- Momin Mehedi: On 15 March 2018, Mehedi, chairman of a political party called Natun Dhara Bangladesh was abducted from Dhaka. He was returned nine days later. He was tortured, his head shaved off, and he was asked if he worked for a foreign intelligence agency.
- Colonel Hasinur Rahman: On 8 August 2018, Hasinur, Bangladesh Army officer and former Rapid Action Battalion, was picked up from home in Mirpur DOHS by alleged members of Detective Branch of Police. He was dismissed from the army over his alleged links to militants. He was found in February 2020, he was speaking incoherently.
- Mashiur Rahman Rony: on 15 September, Rony, president of Narayanganj District unit of Jatiyatabadi Chhatra Dal was a victim of enforce disappearance by alleged members of Detective Branch from Dhaka according to his family at a press conference at the Narayanganj Press Club. After the press conference, Rony was produced before a court by Fatulla police where Rony alleged he was tortured by the Detective Branch.

=== 2019 ===
- Ataur Rahman Shahin: On 2 May 2019, Shahin, an IT professional, was picked up in an unmarked van and forcefully disappeared. He was returned three months later.
- Hafizur Rahman Hafiz: On 20 November 2019, Hafiz, a senior lawyer, went missing in Lalmonirhat District.

=== 2020 ===
- Mujibul Huda Chowdhury Biplob: On 30 March 2020, Biplob, an owner of a furniture store, disappeared from Dhaka.

== Law enforcement ==
On 27 November 2013, former BNP lawmaker Saiful Islam Hiru and BNP leader Humayun Kabir Parvez were abducted while going to Comilla from Laksham. Convicted murderer of Narayanganj Seven Murder, former RAB-11 official Lt Col (sacked) Tareque Sayeed is the number one accused in the case. RAB-11 is accused of burning 2 cars and killing Iqbal Mahmud Jewel in front of BNP leader Sahab Uddin Sabu in Lakshmipur on 23 December 2013. RAB-11 is also accused of throwing down Jamaat leader Foyez Ahmed from the roof of a 2 storied building. RAB -11 is also accused of abducting businessman Tajul Islam in a Hi-ace microbus on 17 February 2013. 13 days after abduction, Tajul's dead body was found from Meghna river. RAB-11 and Tareque Sayeed is accused in the case of abduction of businessman Ismail Hossain who has been missing since 7 February 2014.

== Related issues ==
In April 2014, bodies of seven men were discovered from the Shitalakkhya river. They were strangled, blindfolded and thrown into the river, four days after they were kidnapped few kilometres from Narayanganj district court by RAB men who are accused to do it as contract killing. In this case, on 16 January 2016 ex-AL men, ex-RAB officials among 26 were handed death penalty as the charges of abduction, murder, concealing the bodies, conspiracy and destroying evidences were proved beyond any doubt. On 12 December 2016 RAB claimed arrest of a man from Dhaka who took Tk 50 lakh, posing as a source of law enforcers, from a family, in assurance of tracing a missing member of the family.

== Official response ==
On 23 November 2017 in parliament, the prime minister of Bangladesh, Sheikh Hasina claimed that people also disappeared in other countries. Elite paramilitary force, RAB's Director of Media and Legal Wing, Mufti Mahmud Khan told Al Jazeera about the involvement of RAB in these forced disappearance that these were false allegations and that "RAB is there to curb crimes and it is just doing its job." Law Minister Anisul Huq alleged that the disappearance claims were part of a plot by opposition parties to discredit the government. Sajeeb Wazed, son of Sheikh Hasina, wrote in an article that the Bangladesh police had not uncovered any evidence suggestive of the government's involvement behind any reported disappearance.

== Criticism ==
The incidents of enforced disappearances were condemned by both domestic and international human rights organizations. The main opposition party BNP has held the government responsible for conducting these forced disappearances, and demanded an UN-sponsored investigation into such cases. The British parliament frequently expressed concerns over the forced disappearances of political opponents in Bangladesh. During her visit to Bangladesh in 2012, former U.S. Secretary of State Hillary Clinton expressed concern over the disappearance of Ilyas Ali and Aminul Islam. Despite the demands for the government initiatives to probe such disappearances, investigations into such cases were absent.

In July 2017, Human Rights Watch published an 82-page report accusing the Bangladesh government of secret detention, enforced disappearances, and extrajudicial killings of political opposition members. It called for a halt in such human rights violations. The report also contained gruesome accounts of forcefully picking up and subsequent disappearances of political opposition members at the hands of law enforcement authorities.

During May 2018, the United Nations' High Commissioner of Human Rights and 56 other organizations expressed their concerns about Bangladesh's enforced disappearance and extrajudicial killings in Universal Periodic Review (UPR) of the United Nations.

== See also ==
- Human rights in Bangladesh
- Crossfire (Bangladesh)
- Bangladesh Drug War
