= Guest room =

Guest room or variants may refer to:

- Bedroom
- Hotel room
- Guestroom (album), a 2002 album by Ivy
- The Guest Room, a 2016 novel by Chris Bohjalian
- The Guest Room (film), a 2021 film by Stefano Lodovichi
- Guest Room, a 2015 short film with Lauren Potter
- Guest Room, a 2003 short film with Katie Boland
- "Guest Room", a song by The National from Boxer
- Guest room (Bangladesh), ragging system of Bangladesh Chhatra League
- Guestroom, a 2024 song by Ansel Elgort
