= Chittagong Urea Fertilizer Limited =

- Formation: 1987
- Headquarters: Chittagong District, Bangladesh
- Region served: Bangladesh
- Official language: Bengali
- Website: Chittagong Urea Fertilizer Limited

Chittagong Urea Fertilizer Limited is a urea fertilizer company in Chittagong and is owned by the state owned Bangladesh Chemical Industries Corporation.

== History ==
Chittagong Urea Fertilizer Limited was built in 1987 in Rangadia, Anwara Upazila, Chittagong District, Bangladesh. It was built by the Japanese Toyo Engineering Corporation. The factory has a capacity to produce 1700 tonnes of urea and 1000 tonnes of ammonia per day.

On 31 January 2015, the factory was closed by the government of Bangladesh after the reactor and cooling tower were damaged. The contract for the repair work was given to AXO Welding, an Italian company. The factory was reopened on 7 July 2017 after 400 million taka was spent on repairs. The gas to the factory was supplied by Karnaphuli Gas Distribution Company Limited. Production was suspended again on 22 December 2017 due to gas shortages and resumed on 13 September 2018, in part due to liquefied natural gas.

The factory is closed during summer to divert natural gas to home consumers like most state owned fertilizer companies in Bangladesh. The factory cannot produce at optimal level due to gas shortages and as a result incurs monthly losses of up to 100 million taka. The Bangladesh Chemical Industries Corporation can produce 1.9 million metric ton of fertilizers against the demand for 2.5 million metric ton. The factory has also been blamed for the pollution of Karnaphuli River.

=== Arms trafficking ===
In 2004, elements of the Bangladesh Nationalist Party government of Bangladesh with the aid of Pakistani intelligence agency, tried to smuggle guns through the jetty of Chittagong Urea Fertilizer Limited. The case became known as the 10-Truck Arms and Ammunition Haul in Chittagong. The arms were destined for separatists groups in India. The accused included government ministers and heads of Bangladeshi intelligence agency.

== Chittagong Urea Fertilizer School and College ==
Chittagong Urea Fertilizer School and College (22.2130°N 91.8318°E) is a pre-primary, primary, secondary, and higher secondary school located inside the colony of Chittagong Urea Fertilizer Limited. It was established in 1988 to educate the children and dependents of company employees. It is operated by Bangladesh Chemical Industries Corporation. It has about 40 teachers and 900 students.

It prepares students for the Secondary School Certificate (SSC) and Higher Secondary (School) Certificate (HSC) examinations administered under the Board of Intermediate and Secondary Education, Chittagong.

== See also ==
- Chittagong Urea Fertilizer School and College
