= Aynaghar =

Secret internment centres in Bangladesh

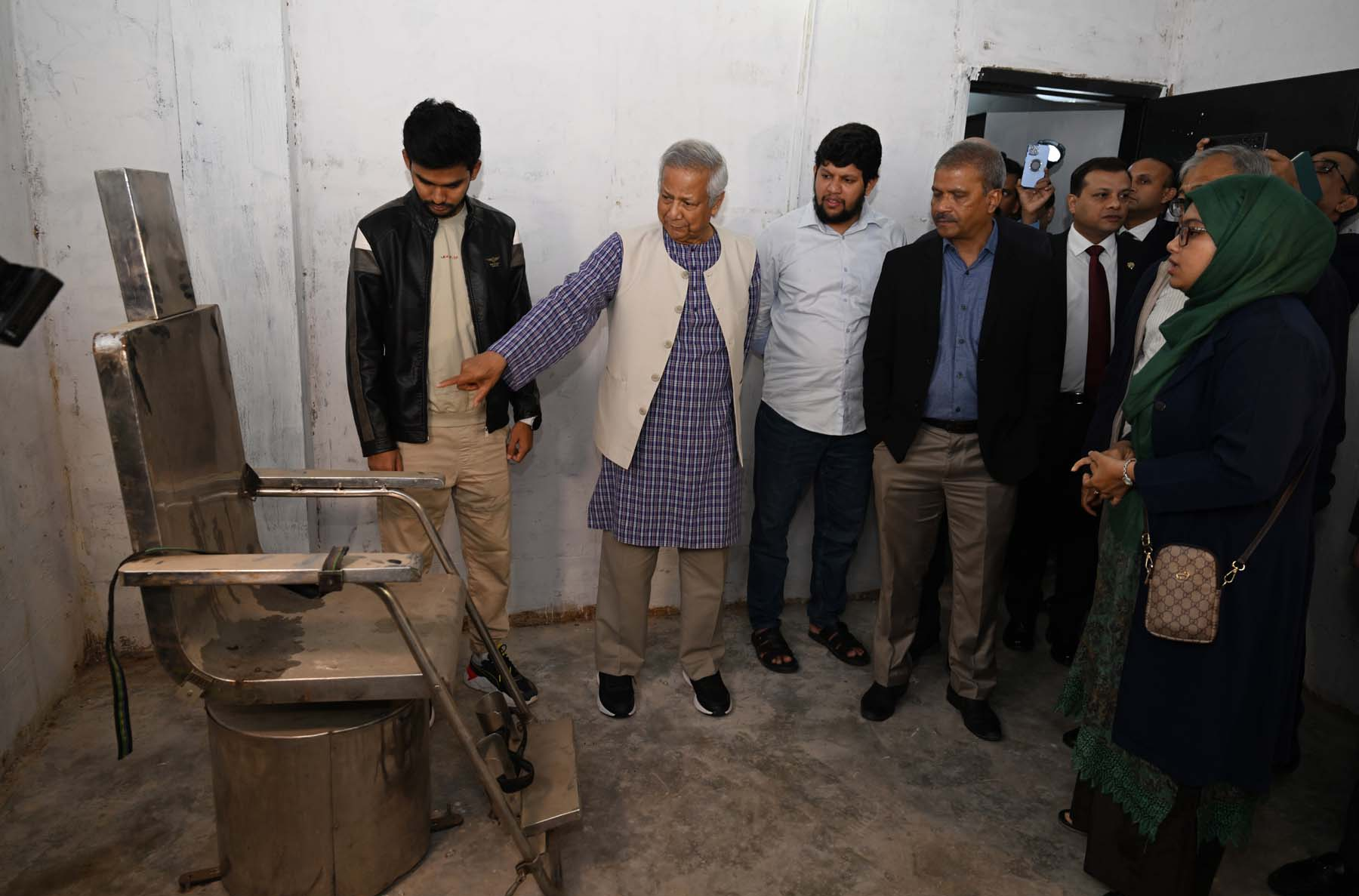
Chief Adviser Muhammad Yunus visiting Aynaghar on 12 February 2025.

Aynaghar (Bengali: আয়নাঘর, romanized: Āẏnāghôr, lit. 'House of Mirrors') is a colloquial term referring to a network of clandestine detention centers which were operated by the Directorate General of Forces Intelligence (DGFI), the intelligence branch of Bangladesh Armed Forces and Rapid Action Battalion (RAB), an elite force unit of Bangladesh Police, during the rule of Sheikh Hasina.

These facilities have been linked to enforced disappearances and human rights abuses during Sheikh Hasina's tenure as the Prime Minister of Bangladesh, particularly from 2009 to 2024. The existence of Aynaghar sparked significant controversy and was consistently denied by the Hasina regime, which faced widespread criticism from human rights organisations and activists. However, after the regime fell in 2024, 500 to 700 cells were found in detention centres throughout the country. At least one centre, next to Dhaka International Airport, with many tiny, dark cells had been bricked up to hide it after the regime fell. People were incarcerated sometimes for many years, and many are thought to have been killed.

== Terminology ==
The term aynaghar (আয়নাঘর) comes from the Bengali words ayna (আয়না), meaning "mirror" and ghar (ঘর), meaning "house" or "room." Thus, aynaghor translates to "house of mirrors". This name reflects the deceptive nature of these facilities, where the harsh realities of detainees' suffering are hidden from public view, similar to how a mirror can distort or obscure an image.

== 2022 report ==
On 14 August 2022, Netra News, a Sweden-based independent news portal, published an investigative whistleblower report alleging that Bangladesh officials were detaining and torturing victims of enforced disappearances at Aynaghar.

Netra News also revealed the possible location of the secret prison, where victims of enforced disappearances are believed to be held in Bangladesh. Their detailed report was based on the on-the-record accounts of two victims of enforced disappearances, Sheikh Mohammad Salim, a citizen of Kapasia of Gazipur and ex-captain of the Bangladesh Army Hasinur Rahman (Bir Protik) who say they were held inside the prison situated in the heart of Dhaka.

Photos of the prison cells were also published, which the news site claimed were provided by active-duty military officers.

== After the fall of the Hasina regime ==
After the Hasina regime fell in 2024, 500 to 700 cells were found in detention centres throughout the country. Investigators reported that the centres were run by the Rapid Action Battalion (RAB), an elite counter-terrorism unit, acting on orders directly from Hasina.

At least one centre, next to Hazrat Shahjalal International Airport, with many tiny, dark cells had been bricked up to hide it after the regime fell. People were incarcerated sometimes for many years, and many are thought to have been killed.

In April 2025, the BBC published a detailed investigative report revealing the existence of a secret prison facility operated adjacent to Dhaka's international airport, allegedly used by the RAB. The facility, discovered after the fall of Sheikh Hasina's government, contained small, pitch-dark cells hidden behind bricked-up walls. Former detainee Mir Ahmad Bin Quasem, a barrister who had been held there for eight years, led investigators to the site by recalling the sound of planes, confirming the proximity to the airport. Prosecutors described the existence of hundreds of similar cells nationwide, calling the network "widespread and systematic." The investigation alleged that many enforced disappearances and acts of torture occurred at this and similar facilities under direct orders from the highest levels of the previous government.

== Description ==
It is alleged that the Counter-terrorism Intelligence Bureau (CTIB) of DGFI is responsible for the maintenance of the original Aynaghar. There are at least 16 rooms with the capacity of holding around 30 detainees at a time. The site is believed to be situated inside the Dhaka Cantonment area of Bangladesh.

High-profile detainees were reportedly referred to by the codename "Mona Lisa", while the secret detention center itself was called the "Art Gallery", which later became known as "Aynaghar". These codenames were used to conceal the true nature of the facility and its operations during the period of enforced disappearances.

== Arbitrary detention ==
Sheikh Hasina's regime was known for forced disappearances and torture of political opponents.

== List of detainees ==
It is reported that the following individuals were detained at this facility:

- Mubashar Hasan, an academic and professor of North South University
- Maruf Zaman, former ambassador of Bangladesh to Vietnam and Qatar
- Aniruddha Kumar Roy, a businessman

Detainees who were released following the resignation of Sheikh Hasina:

- Mir Ahmad Bin Quasem, Bangladeshi barrister and son of Jamaat-e-Islami leader Mir Quasem Ali, confirmed to have been held at a secret facility adjacent to Dhaka airport, according to a 2025 BBC investigation.
- Abdullahil Amaan Azmi, retired brigadier general and son of the Ameer of Bangladesh Jamaat-e-Islami Ghulam Azam
- Michael Chakma, leader of United People's Democratic Front

== Closure ==
On 11 September 2024, Chief Adviser Muhammad Yunus, in his address to the nation marking the one-month anniversary of his administration, announced the signing of the International Convention for the Protection of All Persons from Enforced Disappearance. He stated,

"With this signing, we are now internationally committed to ending the culture of disappearances that took root during the previous regime. In addition, we are establishing a dedicated commission to investigate every case of disappearance that occurred over the past 15 years."

He expressed solidarity with the families who have endured years of anguish, waiting for answers about their missing loved ones, and confirmed that Aynaghar has been closed, with plans to release all detainees as soon as possible.

== Reactions ==
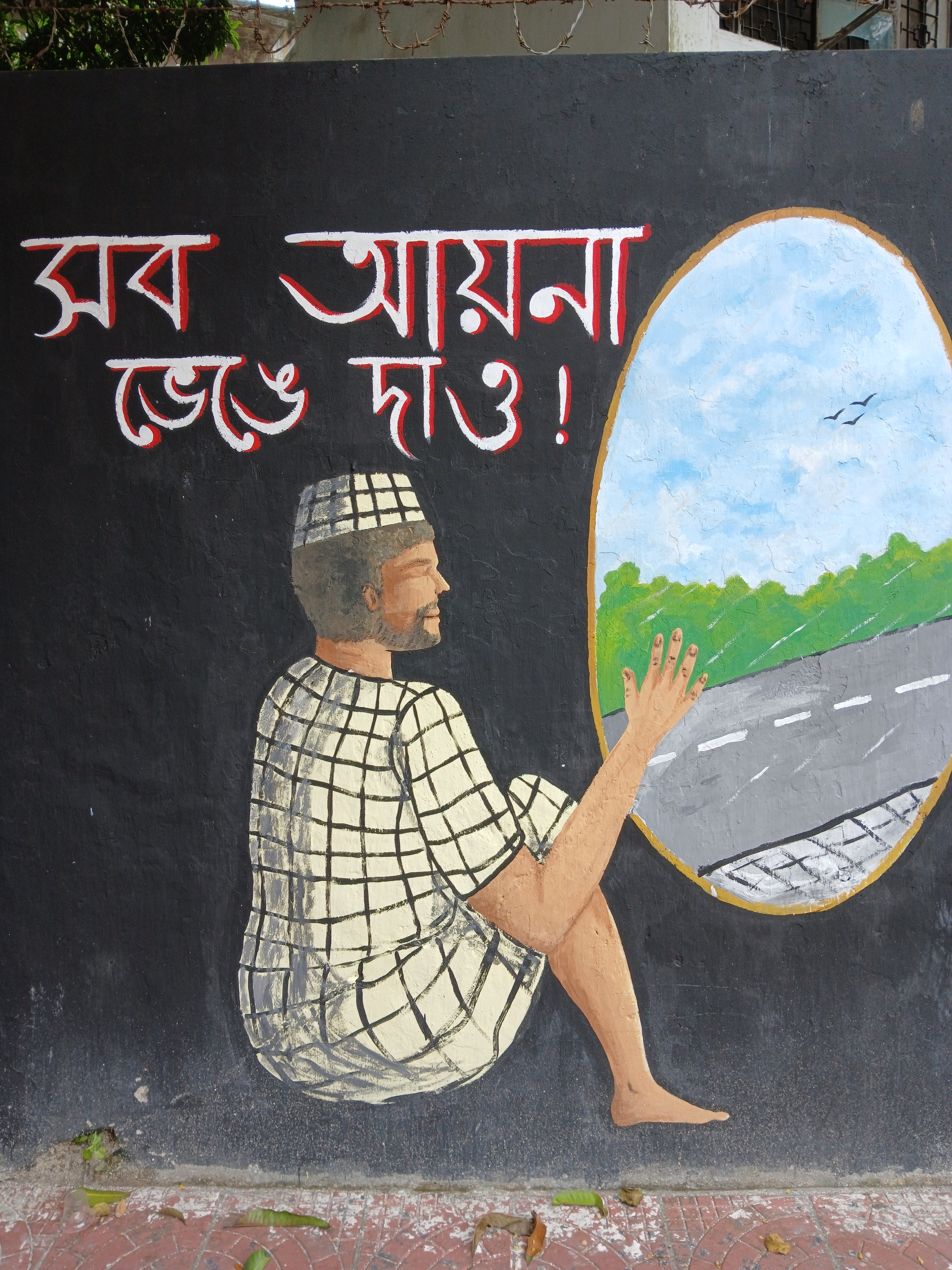
A graffiti in Shahbagh, Dhaka, following the ouster of Hasina, commemorating the captives held there, reading, "সব আয়না ভেঙে দাও" (lit. 'Break all the Mirrors'), referring to Aynaghar

The Netra News report came on the eve of UN human rights chief Michelle Bachelet's four-day visit to Bangladesh, where she met with several ministers in Dhaka about widespread allegations of state-sanctioned disappearances. In a departure press conference on 17 August, the UN human rights chief stated that there are ongoing, alarming allegations of both short-term and long-term enforced disappearances, as well as concerns about a lack of due process and judicial safeguards, and urged the government to establish an impartial, independent, and transparent investigation into allegations of extrajudicial killing, torture, and enforced disappearances.

Meenakshi Ganguly of Human Rights Watch urged the Bangladesh government "take the first step toward accountability" by holding the perpetrators responsible for enforced disappearance. Bangladesh government officials during the Hasina regime dismissed the claims regarding Aynaghar as false and concocted.

Mayer Daak, a platform of families of enforced disappearance victims, organised a rally in support of UN High Commissioner for Human Rights Michelle Bachelet's call for an impartial, independent, and transparent investigation into allegations of enforced disappearance, extrajudicial killing, and torture during her visit to Bangladesh. Its convener, Sanjida Islam, criticised the DGFI for allegedly establishing a secret detention centre and demanded the immediate release of those detained.

The Daily Star suggested that there might be several other such torture and detention sites in various locations of the country.

== See also ==
- Enforced disappearances in Bangladesh
- Human rights in Bangladesh
- Joint Interrogation Cell
- Guest room
- Sednaya Prison
