= Narayanganj Press Club =

- নারায়ণগঞ্জ প্রেস ক্লাব
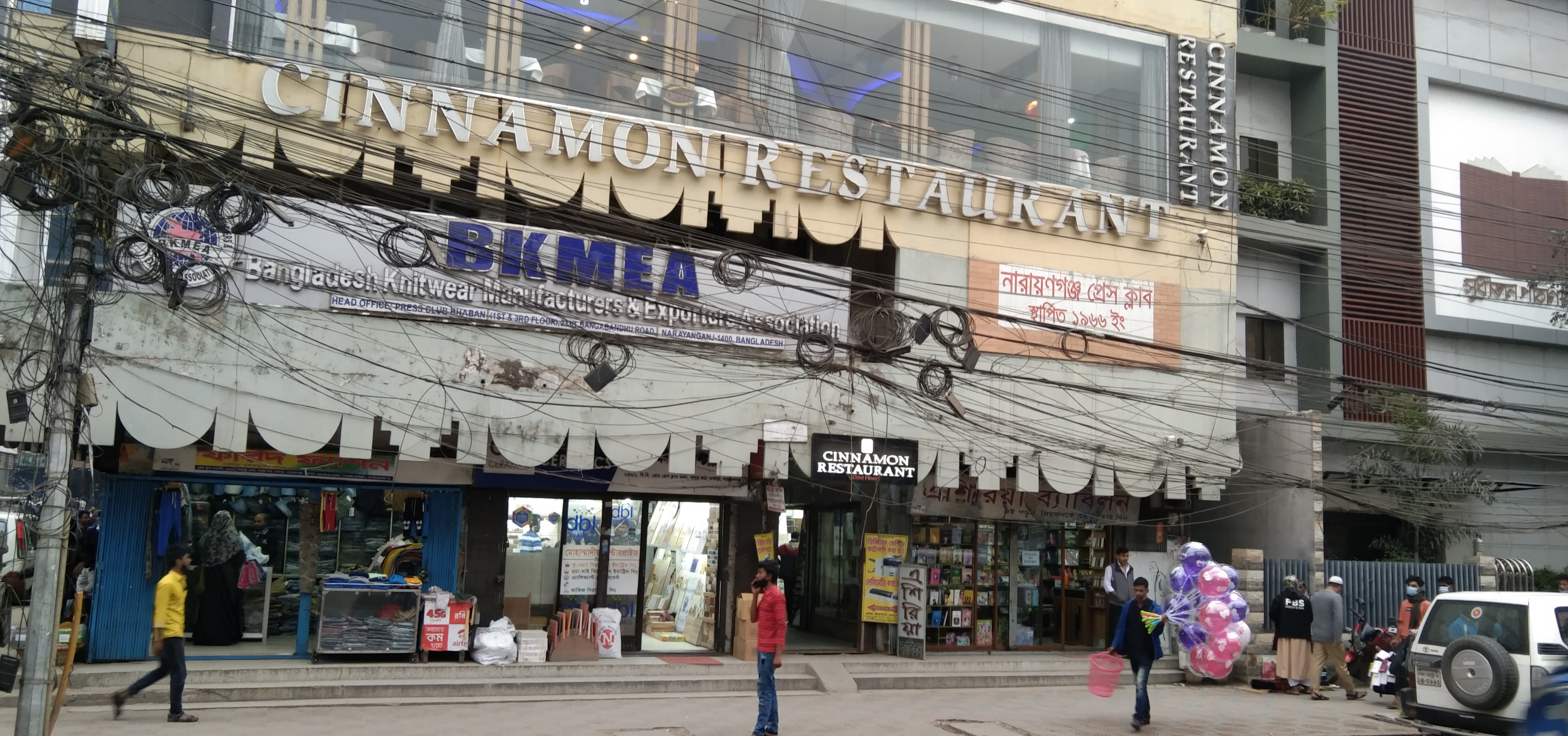
- Formation: 1966
- Headquarters: Narayanganj, Bangladesh
- Region served: Bangladesh
- Official language: Bengali

The Narayanganj Press Club (Bengali: নারায়ণগঞ্জ প্রেস ক্লাব) is an association of journalists in Narayanganj, Bangladesh. Its president is Khandakar Sha Alam and its general secretary is Sorifuddin Sabuz.

== History ==
The Narayanganj Press Club was established in 1966.

In November 2003, garment workers vandalized the Narayanganj Press Club as they thought it was part of the Bangladesh Knit Manufacturers and Exporters Association which had rented a floor from the club. The workers were protesting against long work hours and non-payment of overtime.

A rally was held at the Narayanganj Press Club protesting the attack on Humayun Azad by religious extremists in February 2004.

In June 2008, Rumon Reza of Janakantha and Abu Saud Masud of Amar Desh were elected president and general secretary of the Narayanganj Press Club respectively.

Residents of Narayanganj held a rally at the press club against Titas Gas Distribution and Transmission Company Limited over irregular supply of gas in the city in August 2010. In October 2011, Nasim Osman called for action against Prothom Alo for news reports against Shamim Osman at a press conference at the Narayanganj Press Club. A press conference of Selina Hayat Ivy at the Narayanganj Press Club was stopped by police allegedly at the behest of Shamim Osman.

In March 2013, the father of Tanvir Mohammad Toki, who was murdered, blamed member of parliament Shamim Osman and his son for the murder at a press conference at the Narayanganj Press Club.

Street hawkers, backed by Shamim Osman, attacked a press conference of Narayanganj mayor Selina Hayat Ivy injuring many journalists including the general secretary of Narayanganj Press Club in January 2018. The incident was protested by members of the club and the Narayanganj District Journalists' Union. In September, Jatiyatabadi Chhatra Dal president of Narayanganj District, Mashiur Rahman Rony, was a victim of enforced disappearance by the Detective Branch according to a press conference of his family organized at the Narayanganj Press Club.

On 10 February 2019, the Bangladesh Police prevented a Bangladesh Nationalist Party rally in front of the Narayanganj Press Club.

In February 2021, protests were held at the Narayanganj Press Club against the death of writer Mushtaq Ahmed in police custody.
