= Hasinur Rahman =

Disappeared Bangladeshi military officer

- Born: 12 December 1962 (age 63); Rajshahi, East Pakistan, Pakistan
- Military career
- Allegiance: Bangladesh
- Branch: Bangladesh Army; Bangladesh Rifles
- Service years: 1984-2009
- Rank: Brigadier General (Brevet)
- Unit: Bangladesh Army Armoured Corps
- Commands: CO of 7th Horse Regiment; CO of 25th Rifles Battalion; CO of RAB - 5; CO of RAB - 7; AQ of ARTDOC
- Known for: Forced disappearance
- Conflicts: Chittagong Hill Tracts Conflict; 2006–2008 Bangladeshi political crisis
- Awards: Bir Protik
- Police career
- Unit: Rapid Action Battalion
- Allegiance: Bangladesh
- Branch: Bangladesh Police
- Service years: 2005–2007
- Rank: Director

Hasinur Rahman is a former Bangladesh Army and Rapid Action Battalion officer. He had the rank of Lieutenant Colonel when he was sacked from the army. He had been deprived of promotion during the Awami League regime, have been retrospectively promoted to Brigadier General on 9 February 2026. He was a victim of forced disappearance in Bangladesh (from August 2018 to February 2020) and had been missing for 16 months.

== Career ==
Hasinur was commissioned in the 10th long course of Bangladesh Military Academy in June 1984.

On 3 January 2004 Hasinur, then a commander in Bangladesh Rifles, seized 40 anti-personnel and anti-tank mines. They also seized rocket launchers and chargers after a gunfight with tribal insurgents.

Hasinur served as the commanding officer of Rapid Action Battalion 5 in Rajshahi. On 3 September 2005, he arrived in Chittagong with two squads of RAB personal from RAB-5 and meet with officials of RAB-7 in Chittagong. He set out with an additional squad from RAB-7 to Naikhongchhari Upazila where they were joined by a team from Bangladesh Rifles. They recovered 20 AK-47 rifles and nearly 8 thousand bullets after searching the area.

In 2005–6, Hasinur commanded RAB-7 in Chittagong. In November 2006, he recovered bombs in Cox's Bazar. In April 2006, he led Operation Pahartoli to arrest members of Jamaat-ul-Mujahideen Bangladesh.

Hasinur was dismissed from Bangladesh Army on allegations of involvement with insurgency. He was stationed at the Army Training and Doctrine Command when he was sacked. He had been charged with sedition.

Hasinur joined the Bangladesh Nationalist Party on 10 September 2023 along with 23 other retired defense officers.

== Disappearance and aftermath ==
On 8 August 2018, Hasinur was picked up in Mirpur DOHS near his house by 14 or 15 men. According to his family members those who picked him up were wearing jackets of Detective Branch of Bangladesh Police. His family members filled a General Diary with Pallabi police station. Bangladesh Police recovered his licensed pistol from the site of his abduction and raided his house looking for his licensed shotgun, which according to his family he had sold.

On 22 February 2020, Hasinur was dropped off home. He was speaking incoherently and according to his family had high blood pressure. He had been missing for 16 months. According to him, he was detained at Directorate General of Forces Intelligence's secret prison, Aynaghar.

== See also ==
- List of solved missing person cases (post-2000)
