= Mia Saheb's Maidan =

Mia Saheb's Maidan (Bengali: মিঞা সাহেব ময়দান) is an area of Lakshmi Bazar in Dhaka, Bangladesh. It is where Abdur Rahim Rizvi, known as Mia Saheb, built one of the earliest khanqahs (Sufi lodges) of the city around 1730.

== History ==
Abdur Rahim Rizvi, a Sufi sage, traveled from Kashmir through Murshidabad to Dhaka in about 1730. He established a khanqah in a barren field (maidan) and spread the Naqshbandi tariqa. Locals called him Mia Saheb out of respect. The surrounding area grew to become one of the oldest Muslim neighbourhoods of Dhaka and was called Mia Saheb's Maidan.

In 1738, he was stabbed seven times by a madman. After suffering for 33 days, he died at the age of 84, on the 9th of Ramadan. Although it is now a part of Lakshmi Bazar, some people still call the area Mia Saheb's Maidan.

== Architectural value and present condition ==
Now Mia Saheb's Maidan became the Waqfah of Shah Shaheb. The whole Waqfah is known as "Shah Shaheb Bari Jam-e Masjid"

Now this Waqfah contains:

- a 3 Storeyed Astana's Mosque (established in 1909)
- a Graveyard
- a Building of Mutawalli Room
- a Mazar Sharif of Mia Shaheb
- a Gaddi nasheen's Huzur Khana (established in 1824)

== Present address ==
Now it is situated at 56-57 Municipal Street, Lakshmibazar, Dhaka – 1100.
