= Government Laboratory High School =

Government Laboratory High School, Dhaka

Location
- 1 Naem Road, New Market; 1205; Bangladesh; 23°44′9.97″N 90°22′54.15″E

Information
- Type: Public boys high school
- Motto: Bengali-Alo aro alo {Light, more light (with knowledge)
- Established: 3 September 1961
- School district: Dhaka
- Grades: 1-12
- Campus type: Urban
- Colors: White and Navy Blue
- Accreditation: Board of Intermediate and Secondary Education, Dhaka
- Website: www.glabdhaka.edu.bd

The Government Laboratory High School is a school located in New Market, Dhaka, Bangladesh. The school was established on 3 September 1961. It is a boys' school .

== History ==
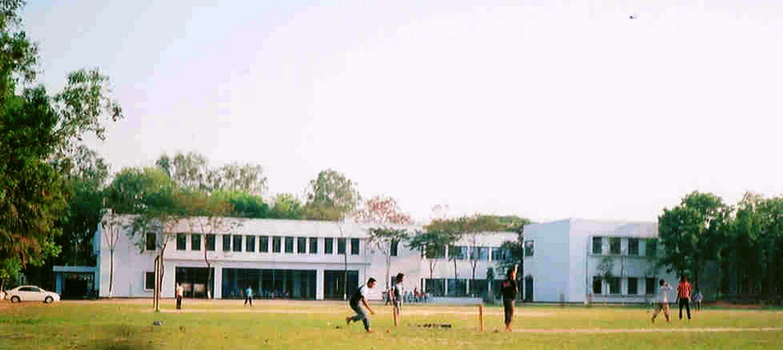
School Building

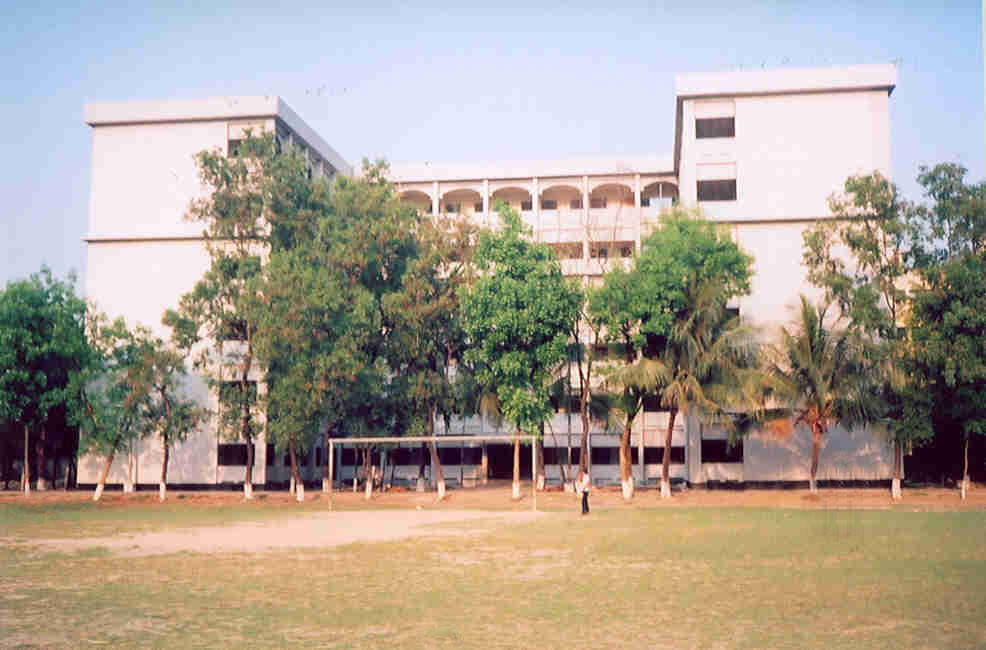
College Building

The principal of the adjacent Govt. Teachers' Training College, Muhammad Osman Gani, sought to establish a facility to assist his trainees practice teaching. From this idea, Government Laboratory High School was created. The school was inaugurated in 1961 by the then Director of the Department of Public Instruction (D.P.I), Muhammad Shamsul Haque. The first headmaster was Khan Muhammad Salek, who went on to serve for 12 years. Below is a list of the first teachers at the school, upon its opening.

- Khan Muhammad Salek (Headmaster)
- A. B. Mofizuddin Ahmed (Assistant Headmaster)
- Sirazul Haq Khan
- Muhammad Zafar Ali
- Abdur Rashid
- Muhammad Zahirul Huq
- Muhammad Nurul Islam
- A. B. M. Nurul Islam
- Muksedur Rahman Hawladar
- Muhammad Sharifuddin
- Khabir Uddin Ahmed
- Muhammad Waliullah
- Muhammad Sadat Ali
- Sri Suranjan Dutta

== Headmasters ==
- Late Khan Muhammad Saleque (1961–1973), (First headmaster and founder)
- Hafiz Uddin Ahmed (1973–1978)
- Zafar Ali Khan (1978–1980)
- Md. Zafar Ali (1980–1980)
- Muhammad Muhibullah (1980–1986)
- Muhammad Nurul Huq Bhuiya (1987–1988)
- Muhammad Rabiul Islam Khan (1989–1991)
- Muhammad Zahirul Haque (1991–1994)
- Muhammad Habibullah Khan (1995–1997)
- Muhammad Momtazur Rahman (1997–1998)
- Muhammad Abdus Sobhan (1998–2000)
- Md. Nasir Uddin (2000–2001)
- Rashid Uddin Zahid (2001–2003)
- Abul Hasanat Faruque (2001–2003)
- Syed Hafizul Islam (2004–2007)
- A.K.M. Mustafa Kamal (2007–2010)
- Md. Abdul Khaleque (2010–2011)
- Md. Abu Sayeed Bhuiyan (2011–2014)
- Md. Abdul Khaleque (2014–2018)
- Md. Abu Sayeed Bhuiyan (2019–2023)
- Md. Alamgir Hossain Talukder (2023–2024)
- Md. Mostofa Sheikh (2024–2025)

== Gallery ==
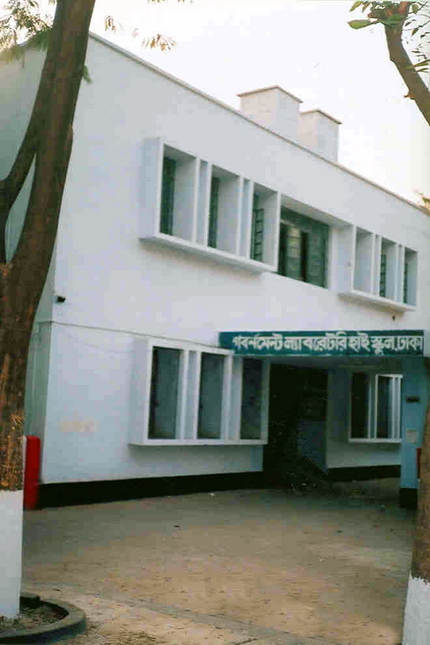
Entrance

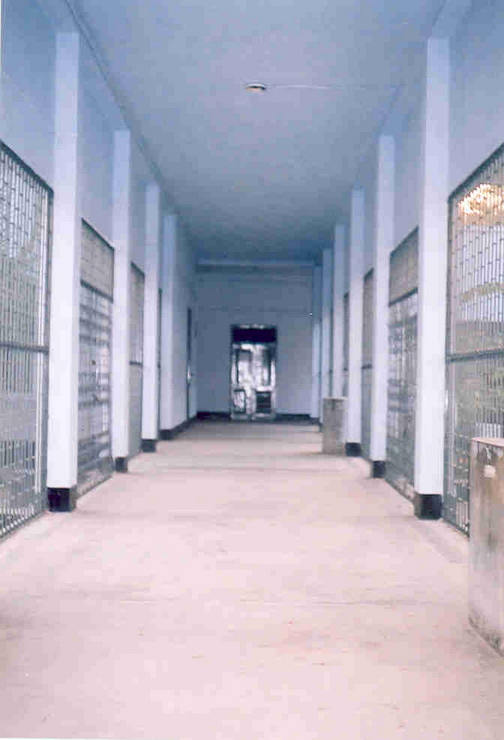
Corridor

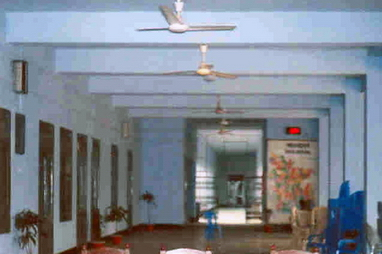
Space in front of the teacher's room

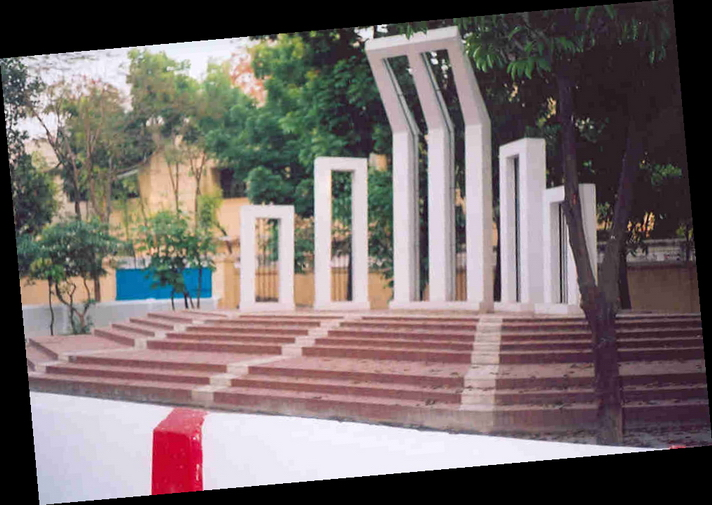
Shaheed Minar

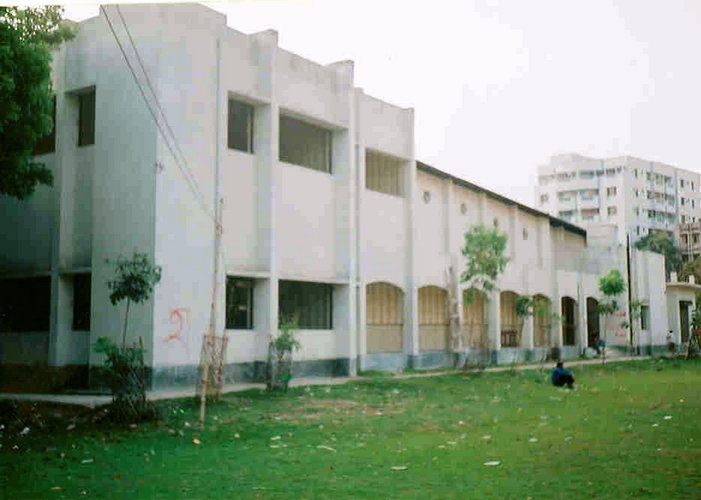
Auditorium

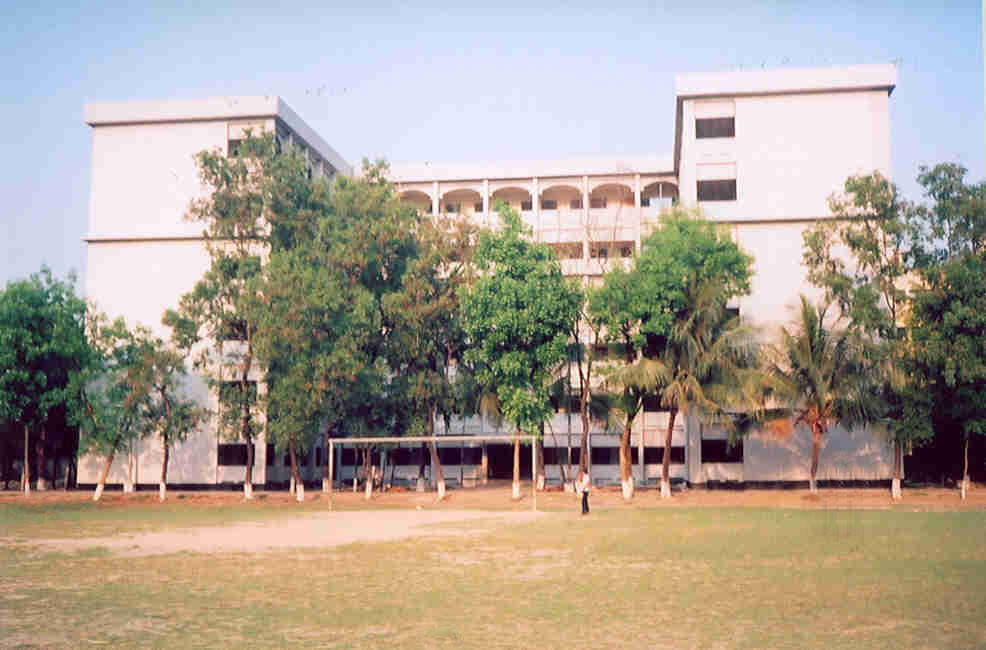
College Building

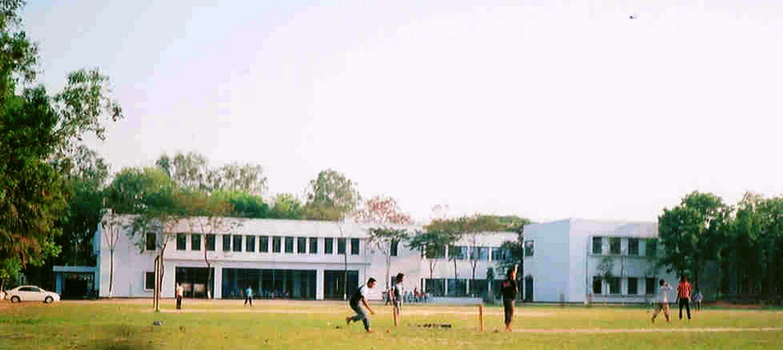
School Playground

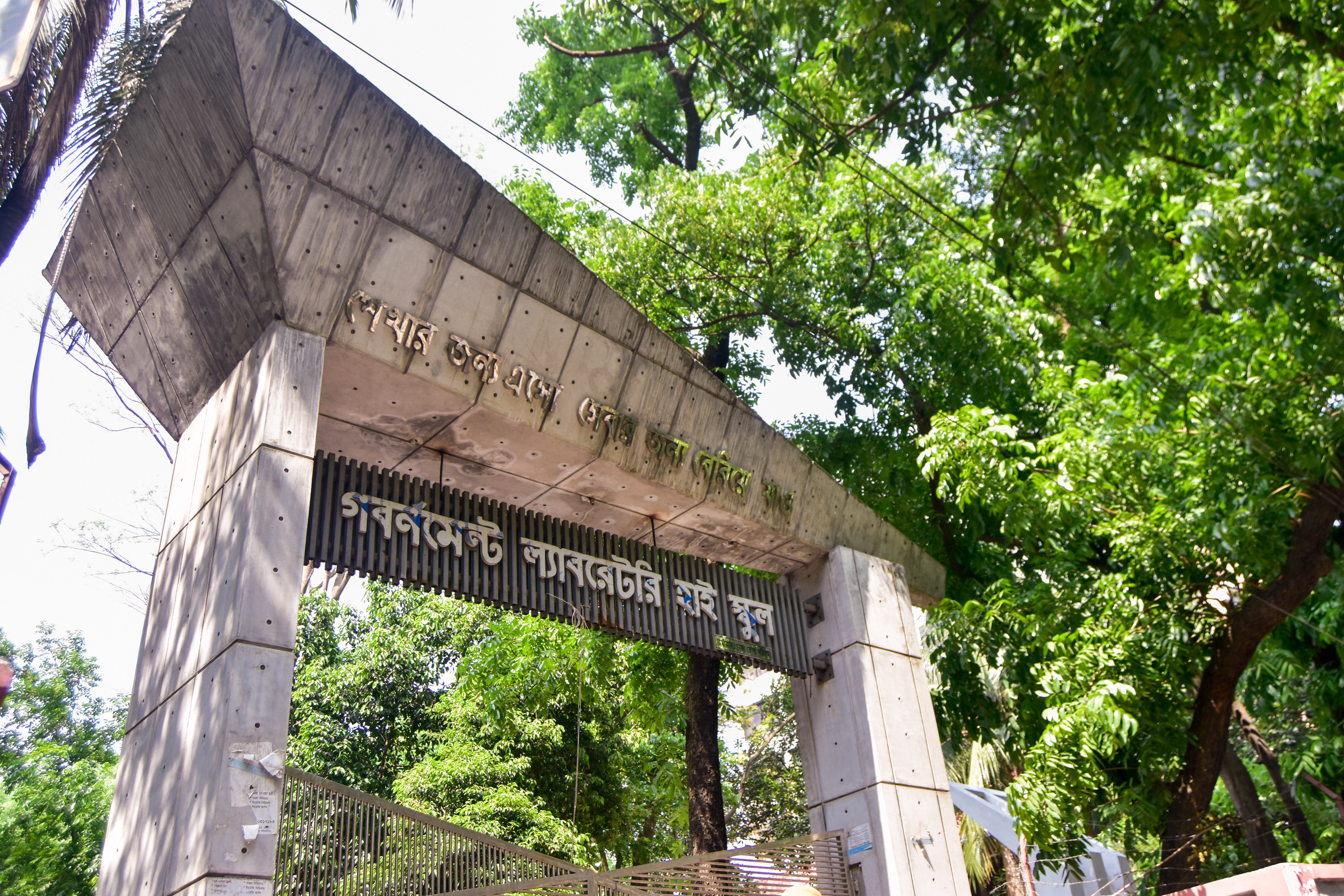
Main gate
