= Mayer Daak =

Human rights organization

Mayer Daak (Bengali: মায়ের ডাক, lit. 'Mother’s Call') is a platform of the families of the people who fell victim to enforced disappearance allegedly by government agencies during the rule of the Awami League led government from 2009 to until date in Bangladesh. The platform was launched with the common interest of the family members of the victims of enforced disappearance in Bangladesh to learn the fate of their beloved one, who went missing after men in plainclothes posing as law enforcers picked them up from various places of the country.

The platform, largely consists of the family members of Bangladesh Nationalist Party leaders since most of the victims had political affiliation with the party, observes the "International Day of the Victims of Enforced Disappearances" every year in Bangladesh.

According to local rights groups, more than 500 people disappeared after being picked up by government agencies since 2009 in Bangladesh. Human Rights Watch published a report on the victims of enforced disappearance in Bangladesh that stated that they have recorded at least 90 cases of enforced disappearance only in 2016.

Mayer Daak is similar to that of Argentina's Mothers of the Plaza de Mayo which was founded by Argentine mothers whose children "disappeared" during the state terrorism of the military dictatorship, between 1976 and 1983.

== Background ==
Bangladesh Awami League came to power after winning the national election of December 2008 against the backdrop of a turmoil political condition after two consecutive regimes of BNP (2001–2006) and military-backed civil government (2007–2008) who were largely criticized for promoting extrajudicial killing with a view to reducing crime.

Prior to the election, Awami League promised to put an end to the spate of extrajudicial killing by government agencies and custodial deaths. However, this practice never ended.

In 2010, due to the former Prime Minister and BNP chief Begum Khaleda Zia’s eviction from her house, BNP started taking streets while on the other hand, their ally Jamaat-e-Islami supporters started demanding the release of their leaders who were involved in war-crime during Liberation War of Bangladesh.

In this context, the government started taking repressive measures against the opposition groups and a few opposition leaders and their activists started disappearing under mysterious situation. The first victim to be recorded was a Dhaka City Corporation councilor Mohammad Chowdhury Alam who was also a member of BNP’s central committee. He was abducted on June 25, 2010.

After Chowdhury Alam, many other disappeared after being picked up by Police, RAB or DB, including a former minister, and many former Member of Parliament. Remarkably, a series of incidents of enforced disappearance occurred just before the national election of January 2014.

== History ==
The families of the victims of enforced disappearance started gathering together to ask the whereabouts of their loved ones from 2014 and have been observing the “International Day of the Victims of Enforced Disappearances” in Bangladesh.

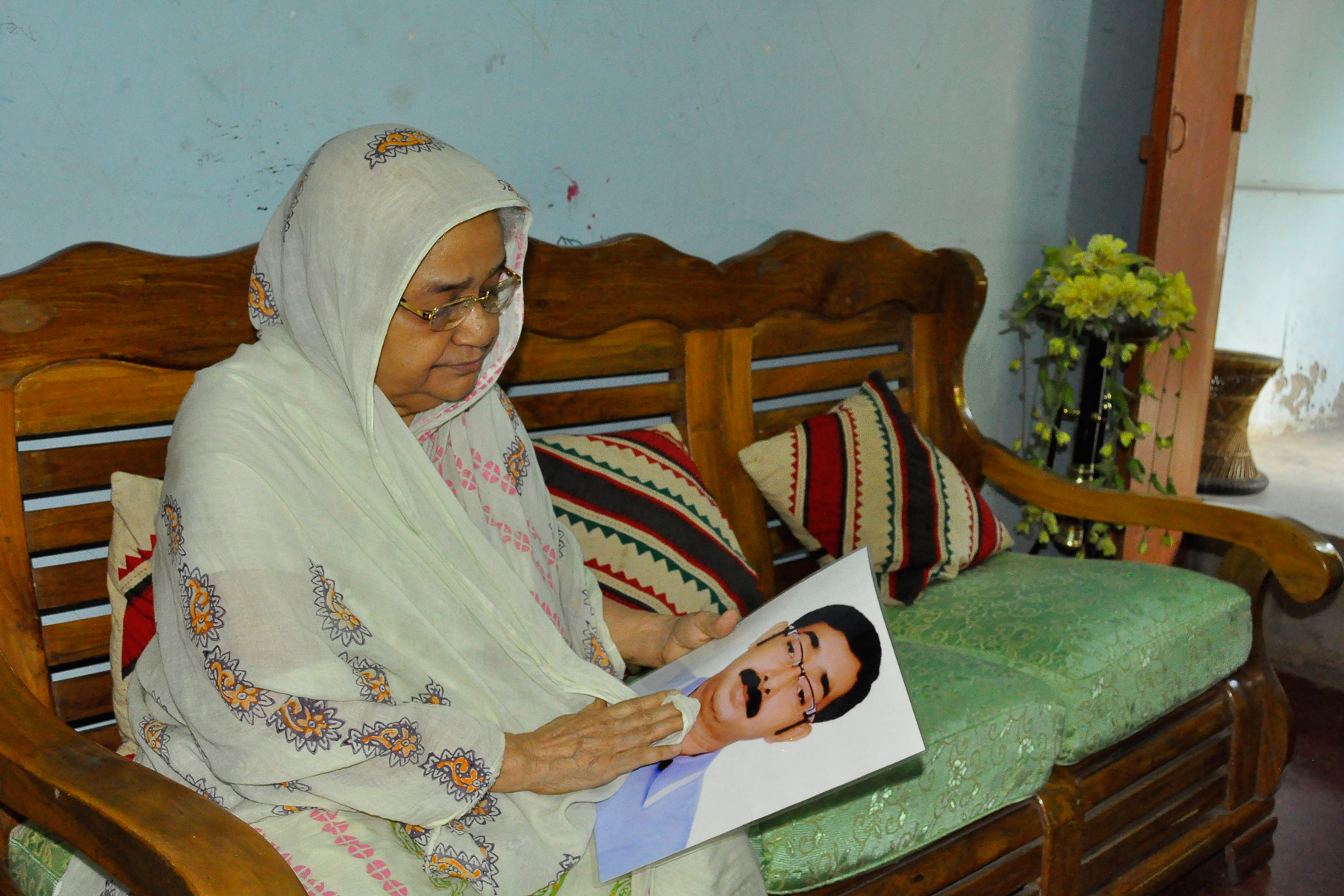
Mother of Sajedul Islam Sumon with his portrait in 2013 (image by VOA)

The name "Mayer Daak" started being visible on local and international media from 2016, after it was founded on 12 March of the same year. The Human Rights Watch report on Bangladesh's enforced disappearance "We don’t have them" and "Joint NGO Alternative Report to the UN Human Rights Committee on Bangladesh" published in 2017 cited the name of this platform and the ordeals of the families.

The first major gathering by the platform was a discussion organized on December 4, 2016, where family members of 20 enforced disappearance victims attended and narrated how their family members were picked up and never returned.

== Programmes and activity ==
Mayer Daak has been observing the UN declared International Day of the Victims of Enforced Disappearance and International Human Rights Day in Bangladesh since 2016. The platform is also credited for bringing the incidents of enforced disappearance, which is often taken lightly by the government, to the forefront of Bangladesh's politics.

They observed International Day of the Victims of Enforced Disappearance on August 29, 2017 by organizing a discussion at the National Press Club of Bangladesh. 29 families came to join the hearing in presence of the noted citizens including Professor Asif Nazrul.

To mark the International Day of Human Rights in 2017, Mayer Daak called for a gathering on December 10 of the year. Members of 24 families came together. By the April 2018, the platform managed to mobilize 85 families of the victims who disappeared during Awami League rule, between 2010 and 2017, and organized a mass-hearing on April 21 of the year where they detailed their ordeals and demanded the government to let them know what happened to their family members.

On August 30, 2018, the platform organized a programme attended by at least 90 families.

Press conference on 1st October 2024 at Dhaka Reporters Unity organized by Mayer Daak Organization.

On 14 December 2022, U.S. Ambassador Peter D. Haas visited the residence of missing BNP leader Sajedul Islam Sumon in Shaheenbagh, Tejgaon, to hold a meeting with Mayer Daak, an organization of the relatives of the victims of enforced disappearances. During the visit, activists from another group named Mayer Daak surrounded the ambassador and attempted to hand over a memorandum. Ambassador Haas quickly left the location in his vehicle. The incident stirred significant political controversy in Bangladesh.

== Reactions ==
In response to that, Bangladesh's major opposition group Bangladesh Nationalist Party's General Secretary Mirza Fakhrul Islam Alamgir said: "The remarks about enforced disappearance that the prime minister made is her admission to the fact that they [the government] are involved in the incidents of enforced disappearance."

Bangladesh's Home Minister Asaduzzaman Khan Kamal said the allegation that the government is pursuing a policy of enforced disappearance is totally baseless. He added: "Many businessmen went into hiding failing to repay their loans in this country. Some people went missing after developing extramarital relationship."

United Nations human rights experts have called on Bangladesh to act now to halt an increasing number of enforced disappearances in the country, in February 2017.

In July 2017, New York-based rights defender group Human Rights Watch published a report on the enforced disappearance of Bangladeshis. Referring to the incidents, Brad Adams, the Asia Director of the organization said: "The Bangladesh government is making a habit of complete disregard for human rights, human life, and the rule of law."

On July 28, 2018, The New York Times published an opinion piece titled: "The Opposition disappears in Bangladesh" on the incidents of enforced disappearance in Bangladesh.

== See also ==
- List of people who disappeared mysteriously: post-1970
- Enforced disappearances in Bangladesh
