= Abdur Rahim (general) =

Bangladesh Army officer (1953–2021)

- Born: 31 October 1953; Cumilla, East Bengal, Pakistan
- Died: 15 August 2021 (aged 68); Dhaka, Bangladesh
- Military career
- Allegiance: Bangladesh
- Branch: Bangladesh Army
- Service years: 1975–2005
- Rank: Major General
- Unit: Corps of Engineers
- Commands: Director General of National Security Intelligence; Commandant of Engineers Centre and School of Military Engineering; Commandant of School of Military Intelligence

Abdur Rahim (31 October 1953 — 15 August 2021) was a Bangladesh Army officer who served as the director general of National Security Intelligence from 2001 to 2005.

== Career ==
Rahim was commissioned in the Bangladesh Army in Comilla in 1975.

== Charges and convictions ==
Rahim was charged in the 2004 Dhaka grenade attack. He used to visit Hawa Bhaban several times during the tenure of the BNP—Jamaat coalition government, He was sentenced to death in the 10-truck arms smuggling case. However, on 18 December 2024, he was acquitted by the Bangladesh High Court in this case. He instructed NSI officials to supervise the offloading off arms in Chittagong Urea Fertilizer Limited jetty. He held several meetings with ARY Group and the ISI regarding the arms in Bangladesh and outside.

In October 2018, Rahim and 18 others were found guilty on charges of killing through common intention, planning and allegations of involvement in the 2004 Dhaka grenade attack. They were sentenced to death. On 1 December 2024, he was acquitted by high court in the 21 August grenade attack case.

Rahim died on 15 August 2021, while under treatment for COVID-19 at the Shaheed Suhrawardy Medical College and Hospital, Dhaka, Bangladesh. He was admitted to hospital on 31 July, after he tested positive for COVID-19 at Kashimpur Central Jail.
