= Netra News =

Bangladesh-focused news organisation

- Type: News website
- Format: Online
- Editor-in-chief: Tasneem Khalil
- Editor: Nazmul Ahasan (executive editor)
- Deputy editor: Nusmila Lohani
- Parent organisation: Stichting Netra News
- Language: English and Bengali
- Website: netra.news

Netra News (Bengali: নেত্র নিউজ) is an investigative and public interest news organisation covering Bangladesh. Founded in Sweden in 2019, it publishes in English and Bengali. Since 2024, it has operated its newsroom largely from Bangladesh.

The website was blocked in Bangladesh shortly after its launch on 26 December 2019. Its investigations have covered high-profile corruption and human rights abuses, including Aynaghar, a secret detention facility it reported on in 2022. In 2025, the organisation received the Shorenstein Journalism Award.

== History ==
Netra News was established in Sweden in November 2019 and began publishing on 26 December that year. Its co-founders included Tasneem Khalil, a Bangladeshi journalist living in exile in Sweden, and British journalist David Bergman. In its inaugural editorial, the publication said it would withhold the identities of its journalists because of security concerns.

Israt Jahan joined as editor of the Bengali edition on 1 November 2020. Bergman remained regularly involved with the publication until late 2022, after which he continued to contribute occasionally.

Following the August 2024 uprising that brought down Sheikh Hasina's government, Netra News moved much of its news operation to Dhaka.

By 2026, Nazmul Ahasan was serving as executive editor, having previously worked as a US economy reporter for Bloomberg News. Ahasan was among the journalists who produced Body Count: Extrajudicial Executions in Bangladesh, a Netra News data investigation that drew on records of more than 2,500 killings over a decade and won a Sigma Award in 2024.

== Organisation and funding ==
Netra News began as a project of Bangladesh Media Network, a nonprofit organisation. According to its website, its parent organisation is now Stichting Netra News, a nonprofit foundation registered in the Netherlands, while the publication remains registered as an online publication in Sweden.

As of 2026, its editorial leadership includes Khalil as editor-in-chief, Ahasan as executive editor, Nusmila Lohani as deputy editor, and Rahman Mufiz as Bengali-language editor. The organisation maintains a public staff directory.

Netra News launched with a grant from the National Endowment for Democracy, a private nonprofit foundation funded by the US government. According to Netra News, it continues to receive support from the foundation. Its website also lists grants or other support from the Fojo Media Institute, the Organized Crime and Corruption Reporting Project, the Taiwan Foundation for Democracy, and Open Society Foundations.

== Reporting ==
=== Corruption and financial disclosures ===
Among Netra News' first investigations was "A wrist of luxury", published on 26 December 2019, which examined expensive watches worn by Obaidul Quader, Bangladesh's road transport and bridges minister and general secretary of the Awami League. The report questioned the relationship between the watches' value and his declared income and alleged that some had been received in exchange for awarding contracts. Quader denied accepting anything from contractors and said the watches were gifts from party supporters living abroad. Transparency International Bangladesh subsequently called for an investigation and questioned why the gifts had not been deposited in the state treasury.

In January 2020, Netra News reported that Tabith Awal, the Bangladesh Nationalist Party's candidate for mayor of Dhaka North, had not disclosed his ownership of a Singapore-based company in his election affidavit. Awal declined to comment on the report. On 27 January, the High Court rejected a petition seeking to cancel his candidacy, citing the proximity of the election.

=== COVID-19 pandemic ===
In March 2020, Netra News reported on a leaked draft United Nations memorandum that projected up to two million deaths in Bangladesh without appropriate measures to contain COVID-19. Netra News quoted the World Health Organization's country representative as saying that the document had been developed jointly by UN agencies, the Bangladesh government and development partners. Foreign Minister A. K. Abdul Momen criticised the document's disclosure.

=== Security forces and human rights ===
In May 2020, Netra News published an investigation alleging that the Directorate General of Forces Intelligence (DGFI), Bangladesh's military intelligence agency, employed civilian hackers to access the social media accounts of government critics and manipulate content on Facebook.

On 14 August 2022, Netra News published "Secret prisoners of Dhaka", an investigation alleging that victims of enforced disappearance were being detained and tortured at Aynaghar, or the "House of Mirrors", a secret detention facility operated by the DGFI in Dhaka. The report drew on accounts from two former detainees, who subsequently reaffirmed their accounts in interviews with Voice of America. Home Minister Asaduzzaman Khan rejected the report as false.

After Hasina's government fell in August 2024, several people held in secret detention were released. Subsequent reporting documented former detainees' accounts and investigators' examination of secret detention sites, including cells near Dhaka's international airport.

== Censorship and legal proceedings ==
Access to Netra News began to be blocked in Bangladesh on 28 December 2019, two days after its launch. Khalil told the Committee to Protect Journalists (CPJ) that the website was inaccessible nationwide by the following day. He alleged that the DGFI had ordered the blocking, although CPJ said it could not independently confirm the agency's involvement. The chairman of the Bangladesh Telecommunication Regulatory Commission said the regulator had not received a government order to block the website.

A mirror website used to make Netra News accessible in Bangladesh was also blocked after publication of the UN memorandum on COVID-19 in March 2020. In April, authorities blocked the English and Bengali websites of BenarNews, which had also reported on the memorandum.

Human Rights Watch reported that security officers visited Khalil's mother in Sylhet in April 2020, questioned her about her son's journalism and threatened her over his reporting. In June 2021, police submitted a supplementary charge sheet naming Khalil and six others in a case under the Digital Security Act concerning allegations of spreading rumours and conducting anti-government activities.

In August 2022, a lawyer and local Awami League official filed a case under the Digital Security Act against Netra News and former army officer Hasinur Rahman, one of the interviewees in the Aynaghar investigation. The complaint alleged that the report damaged the reputation of the DGFI and Bangladesh. A court in Rangpur directed the Criminal Investigation Department to investigate.

== Awards and recognition ==
In September 2023, "Secret prisoners of Dhaka" received a Certificate of Excellence at the Global Shining Light Awards, organised by the Global Investigative Journalism Network.

In 2024, Body Count: Extrajudicial Executions in Bangladesh won a Sigma Award for data journalism. That year, a documentary about the Rapid Action Battalion, produced by Deutsche Welle in collaboration with Netra News, won the documentary video category at the Human Rights Press Awards.

On 1 May 2025, Stanford University's Walter H. Shorenstein Asia-Pacific Research Center announced Netra News as the recipient of the 2025 Shorenstein Journalism Award, recognising its investigations into corruption and human rights abuses in Bangladesh. Khalil accepted the award on the organisation's behalf at Stanford on 7 October 2025.
