= 2004 arms and ammunition haul in Chittagong =

Seizure of illegal shipment in Bangladesh

The incident of the 10-Truck Arms and Ammunition Haul took place in Chittagong, Bangladesh, on the night of 1 April 2004, when police and Coast Guard interrupted weapons being loaded in ten trucks and seized extensive illegal arms and ammunition at a jetty of Chittagong Urea Fertilizer Limited (CUFL) on the Karnaphuli River. This is believed to be the largest arms smuggling incident in the history of Bangladesh.

Investigators believed that delivery was intended for the United Liberation Front of Asom (ULFA), a militant group seeking the independence of Assam from India and considered responsible for causing thousands of deaths since 1979. Its military wing chief, Paresh Baruah, then living in Dhaka, was among the 50 persons ultimately charged in the case.

This incident occurred during the administration of the Bangladesh Nationalist Party and its Four-Party alliance, which led the government from 2001 to late October 2006. Media analysts said that, given the scale of the operation and existing problems with corruption, high government officials and intelligence officers were believed to be involved in the smuggling plans. In 2004, arms smuggling charges were filed against a total of 45 individuals under the Armed Forces (Special Powers) Act and arms charges against 43 persons under the Arms Act. In March 2009, one of the accused submitted a ten-page statement, saying he had told the police of high-level government involvement as early as 2005. He said his confessions were not recorded and officials warned him against repeating his statements, upon the threat of death.

In early 2007 the caretaker government filed corruption charges against more than 160 politicians, civil servants and businessmen; it continued to develop this case. Prosecution of this smuggling case has continued under the Awami League government, formed after the December 2008 general elections.

== Seizure ==
The police and Coast Guard interrupted the loading of materials in the smuggling incident. They seized ten truckloads of material: a total of 4,930 different types of sophisticated firearms; 27,020 grenades; 840 rocket launchers, 300 rockets, 2,000 grenade launching tubes; 6,392 magazines; and 1,140,520 bullets, which were being loaded on ten trucks from two-engine boats at the jetty of CUFL at Chittagong harbour. The illegal arms were believed to be intended for ULFA, the militant organisation working for independence of Assam from India, with many members based in Bangladesh. It is classified as a terrorist group by India and considered responsible for thousands of deaths since its founding in 1979.

Ahadur Rahman, then officer-in-charge of Karnaphuli police station, filed a case related to the incident on 3 April 2004. He was appointed as Investigation Officer (IO) of the cases. After 22 days, the cases were transferred to the national CID, where ASP AKM Kabir Uddin was appointed IO. He submitted the first charge sheet to the court on 11 June 2004. In 2004, arms smuggling charges were filed against a total of 45 individuals under the Special Powers Act and arms charges against 43 persons under the Arms Act.

The Bangladesh National Party, which led the government at the time of the smuggling incident, resigned at end of term in October 2006 and a caretaker government took charge for the 90-day period until elections. On 11 January 2007, Chief Advisor and President Iajuddin Ahmed announced he would be resigning from the CA position and appointing a replacement; the military had intervened to support a neutral government following the withdrawal of the Awami League from elections scheduled for 22 January. The prominent banker, Fakhruddin Ahmed, who had been with the World Bank, was appointed as Chief Advisor.

== Trial ==
Since 2007, prosecution has been emphasised for the arms smuggling and illegal arms charges in this smuggling case. Those charged in this case have included the following politicians and military officers who had held senior positions in the BNP-led government, which resigned at its end of term in late October 2006:

- Former Director General of National Security Intelligence, Major General Rezzakul Haider Chowdhury.
- Former Director General of National Security Intelligence Brigadier General Abdur Rahim.
- former Additional Secretary to the Industries Ministry, Nurul Amin;
- former NSI director: Wing Commander Shahabuddin Ahmed,
- Major Liakat Hossain, and
- Field officer Akbar Hossain.

In addition, the following prominent company officials were charged in this case: Mohshin Talukder, managing director of Chittagong Urea Fertiliser Limited, and its general manager, AKM Enamul Haque.

The military wing chief of ULFA, Paresh Baruah, was also charged. Since 1979, ULFA has been implicated in violence resulting in the deaths of thousands in its struggle for independence of Assam from India. "The Indian authorities have long complained that Bangladesh has become a safe haven for insurgent groups active in north-eastern Indian states." Since 2008, the government of Bangladesh has been working with India against such terrorist groups.

Nurul Amin and Paresh Baruah fled the country before being arrested. Many of the other suspects were arrested.

On 26 June 2011, the current Investigation Officer in the smuggling case submitted a supplementary charge sheet before the court of Chief Metropolitan Magistrate, Paresh Chandra Sharma, that implicated eleven more people. Including overlap, the total number of suspects charged was 50 in the smuggling case and 52 in the arms case. New people charged included Motiur Rahman Nizami, former Industries Minister under the BNP government; and Lutfozzaman Babar, former State Minister for Home Affairs. Four suspects have died since the original charges were filed.

Md Hafizur Rahman and Din Mohammad, charged in the smuggling case, submitted statements to the Metropolitan Magistrate Md Osman Gani on 2 March 2009, saying that the massive amount of arms and ammunition was being smuggled under the direct supervision of ULFA leader Paresh Barua, who was residing in Dhaka at that time. In addition, they said that numerous men associated with the BNP-led government and Jatiya Party, including members of parliament, government officials, leaders of the National Security Intelligence (NSI) and Directorate General of Forces Intelligence (DGFI), were aware of the operation.

Hafizur had a ten-page statement, reiterating what he said was information earlier provided to police after he surrendered on 25 October 2005. But, he said his earlier confessions were never recorded, and officials warned him against making such statements. He said in his 2009 statement that they had threatened him with death. He discussed first being contacted in 2001 about accepting a shipment at Chittagong. It was not until February 2004 that he learned the true identity of a man he knew originally as Zaman; the man admitted to being Paresh Baruah, military wing chief of ULFA.

The trials began in 2012 in Chittagong. On 28 November 2012, tight security accompanied ten of eleven charge-sheeted accused persons who were presented in court. That day, the prosecution witness Mobin Hossain Khan, former assistant security officer of Chittagong Urea Fertilizer Limited (CUFL), testified that former Industries Secretary Nurul Amin was informed of the smuggling operation in advance. The next sessions were scheduled for 7 January 2013.

== Verdict ==
On 30 January 2014, a special court in Chittagong commuted death sentence to Paresh Barua and 13 others, including Jamaat chief and then industries minister Motiur Rahman Nizami and then state minister for home Lutfozzaman Babar, for smuggling in ten truckloads of firearms in 2004.

== Appeal & Disposal ==
On 6 November 2024, the death reference and appeal against the judgment of the Judiciary Court on this truck weapon case was heard on high court of Bangladesh.

On 18 December 2024, the High Court acquitted four individuals, including former State Minister for Home Affairs Lutfozzaman Babar and former NSI Director General (Ret.) Major General Rezzaqul Haider Chowdhury, in this case.

On 14 January 2025, the High Court acquitted six individuals, including former State Minister for Home Affairs Lutfozzaman Babar and former NSI Director General (Ret.) Major General Rezzaqul Haider Chowdhury, in a case filed under the Arms Act. Additionally, the sentences of five out of the 14 individuals who had received life sentences, including Paresh Baruah, were reduced. Paresh Barua's sentence was reduced to 14 years, and the sentences of four other accused individuals were reduced to 10 years.
