= Chhatra League's guest room practice =

Ragging system of Bangladesh Chhatra League

Guest room practice
- "Torture Corner" written in Bengali in a former guest room facility at the Bangladesh Agricultural University
- Location: University halls in Bangladesh
- Target: General students; non-partisan and opposition student groups
- Attack type: Ragging; Political repression
- Injuries: est. 1500+ students
- Perpetrator: Bangladesh Chhatra League
- Motive: Forcing participation in party programs; Recruiting party activists; Establishing campus dominance

The guest room practice was a ragging system or tradition in the residential halls of Bangladeshi universities carried out by Chhatra League, the student wing of Awami League, where seniors teach juniors the "norms and etiquette" of movement on campus and in the halls for political purposes. During this practice, students have often been reportedly subjected to physical and mental abuse. Students and local newspapers have described this culture as "torture cells" of Chhatra League.

Chhatra League tortured students at various times in order to occupy university dormitories and maintain dominance in campuses across the country. Chhatra League established guest room culture in universities like Dhaka University (DU), Rajshahi University (RU), Chittagong University (CU), Jahangirnagar University (JU), Islamic University (IU), etc. Due to torture by Chhatra League and Jubo League, many had left university dormitories.

The main centers of Chhatra League's guest room culture were various residential halls of Dhaka University. Chhatra League created these guest rooms to keep control of university halls and to turn general students into party activists. However, Chhatra League leaders denied these allegations, saying that they only exchanged general views with everyone in the guest room and no one was forcibly taken there.

== Characteristics ==
Chhatra League turned every hall of Dhaka University into a center of guest rooms. In addition, almost all residential halls of universities in Bangladesh had torture cells in the name of guest rooms. If there was no guest room, then Chhatra League used personal rooms for this purpose.

Depending on the university, guest rooms or torture cells were generally of two or three types. These were large and small guest rooms. Large guest rooms were used for a higher number of students, and these sessions might take place once or twice a week. For a smaller number of students, mini guest rooms were used, which might take place three to four times a week. These usually ran from 10.00 pm to 12.00 am or even longer.

First-year students had to stand in the guest room, and seniors are gradually allowed to sit. According to students, these practices had two phases. In the first phase, one or two senior batches teach juniors various norms, manners, and behavioral rules in a commanding tone. In the second phase, the most senior students give some speeches directed at all the juniors.

== Extent of torture ==
According to a report by Deutsche Welle, an investigation found that between 2009 and 2014, at least 1,500 people were seriously injured due to physical abuse by Chhatra League. According to The Daily Campus, during this period, 5,327 students were subjected to abuse by Chhatra League. Among them, 1,032 were general students, 411 were students from political student organizations, and 3,884 were Chhatra League's own activists who became victims of internal conflict. According to an investigation by Dainik Shiksha, between 2013 and 2019, 58 incidents of abuse took place in 13 residential halls of Dhaka University, and more than 50 students were victims. A report by the human rights organization, Students Against Torture, says that in 2022 alone, 27 general students were seriously injured in 20 incidents at Dhaka University.

At Rajshahi University, over a hundred students were attacked by Chhatra League between 2021 and 2022. During this time, at least 23 students were tortured and expelled from the halls. Among these, at least 42 written complaints were submitted. The university administration formed 13 investigation committees. However, the administration could not punish anyone.

On 31 March 2017, students of the Computer Science and Engineering (CSE) department of Bangladesh University of Engineering and Technology (BUET) opened a website to report student abuse. Within 2.5 years, 166 complaints were submitted against Chhatra League. Due to this ragging and torture by Chhatra League, at least 30 students of BUET were forced to leave BUET between 2014 and 2019.

Gono Odhikar Parishad leader and former Vice President of Dhaka University Central Students' Union (DUCSU) Nurul Haque Nur said that from 2013 to 2019, 282 students were tortured in guest rooms at Dhaka University. And during this period, 92 incidents of torture occurred.

== In Dhaka University ==
The Dhaka University unit of Chhatra League was the most active; this unit carried out duties at the central level. Because of this, most reports of guest room torture came from Dhaka University. In 18 halls of Dhaka University, there were at least 160 gono-rooms (lit. 'mass rooms') under the control of Chhatra League. Among them, in 13 halls, 80% of the rooms were also controlled by Chhatra League. For example, almost all of the 296 rooms in Dr. Muhammad Shahidullah Hall, 100 out of 104 rooms in Sir A.F. Rahman Hall, 70% of 388 rooms in Masterda Surya Sen Hall, and almost all of the 388 rooms in Haji Muhammad Mohsin Hall were under Chhatra League control. In many halls, there were even political blocks called Montripara for carrying out guest room torture.

Since the 1990s, there have been reports of harassment of students in guest rooms. In the last three months of 2021, at least 30 students of Dhaka University were victims of physical abuse. A student of Dhaka University named Mizanur Rahman said,

On winter nights, one has to roam the entire campus with a bare body. One must stay outside the hall the whole night, but going to any other hall is not allowed. One has to go to Hatirjheel and sit there for six hours at night. Selfies of these must be taken and shown as proof to the senior brothers. Besides this, they are beaten with hockey sticks, sticks, etc. They are made to do sit-ups holding their ears. They are threatened with being tagged as Shibir. Unable to endure all this, many students are forced to leave the hall.

— Mizanur Rahman, Student (University of Dhaka), Deutsche Welle

At DU, the guest room torture had increased so much that, in 2023, at the annual Senate session of Dhaka University, a teacher from the Dhaka University White Panel, Professor Lutfur Rahman, mentioned the guest room culture and torture in the residential halls in his speech. However, the Vice-Chancellor of Dhaka University Mohammad Akhtaruzzaman withdrew the term, "guest room torture". As a protest, two teachers immediately boycotted the Senate session. Many groups and organizations protested against the behavior of this Vice-Chancellor.

== Incidents in universities ==
=== Dhaka University ===
- On 23 January 2020, in the guest room of Shaheed Sergeant Zahurul Haque Hall of DU, four students were beaten throughout the night in front of a residential teacher on allegations of being associated with Chhatra Shibir. Later, police admitted them to the hospital in a severely injured condition.
- On 24 April 2024, a student fell ill and became unconscious due to guest room torture at DU.

=== Bangladesh University of Engineering and Technology ===
- In 2015, BUET Chhatra League president Shubhra Jyoti Tikadar physically assaulted a student by kicking him in the face and causing bleeding while another Chhatra League member sprinkled salt on the wound.
- In 2017, Asad Rahman, a student of the Electrical Engineering Department of Suhrawardy Hall, was tortured for almost an hour. The following year, he left BUET and got admitted to a public medical college.
- On 24 January 2018, BUET student Arafat Hossain was accused of having links with Islami Chhatra Shibir. 20-25 Chhatra League members took him near the gymnasium and started beating him randomly. They beat him repeatedly with stamps and hockey sticks, due to which he lost consciousness and broke his hand.
- On 7 August 2018, Dayyan Nafiz from the Mechanical Engineering Department of Suhrawardy Hall was beaten under the leadership of the BUET Chhatra League president for supporting the 2018 Safe Roads Movement. Chhatra League members named Russell, Raj, and Dihan beat him with a cricket stump. They beat him from the soles of his feet up to his thighs using the stump.
- On 27 June 2019, Ahsanullah Hall student Abhijit Kor from the Chemical Engineering Department was struck in the ear for protesting student torture. He lost hearing in one ear.
- On 3 October 2019, a student named Ehtesham was brutally beaten in room 202 of Sher-e-Bangla Hall and thrown out of the hall. Chhatra League also looted clothes, expensive computers, and other belongings from his room.

=== Rajshahi University ===
- On 3 April 2011, a student named Zahid from the Rajshahi University was tortured. At one point during the brutal beating, a leader of Chhatra League cut the tendon of his leg.
- On 8 August 2017, twelve students were beaten by Chhatra League on suspicion of being Jamaat-Shibir members. Their laptops and cash were taken. They were even thrown out of their residential halls. Some of them were seriously injured from the beating and had to be admitted to the hospital.
- On 17 August 2022, a student named Al-Amin from the department of Accounting was detained for three hours at Bangabandhu Sheikh Mujibur Rahman Hall. He was physically tortured, and 45,000 taka was forcibly withdrawn from his debit card.
- On 24 October 2022, a student of the department of Economics named Shamsul Islam had a knife held to his throat, and 20,000 taka was taken from his wallet. He was then brutally beaten with rods and stumps. This attack was carried out by the General Secretary of Motihar Hall Chhatra League, Bhaskar Saha, and a team of four members.
- On 14 February 2023, a student of the department of Mass Communication and Journalism named Krishna Roy was beaten on suspicion of being associated with Jamaat-Shibir. Leaders and activists of Suhrawardy Hall branch of Chhatra League of the university took part in this attack.
- On 4 August 2023, Md. Nazrul Islam, a student of the Islamic Studies department at Sher-e-Bangla Fazlul Haque Hall, was beaten. He was taken to the hall guestroom, the door was locked, and he was beaten randomly. At one point, he fell to the ground, and blood started coming out of his ear.

=== University of Chittagong ===
- On 3 June 2023, Jahid Hasan, a student of the department of History, was beaten by Chhatra League militants after being tagged as a member of Shibir. He was severely injured by random punches, kicks, and slaps to extract a confession of being a Shibir member. Chhatra League even demanded 50,000 taka as extortion.

=== Jahangirnagar University ===
- On 12 May 2015, some Chhatra League activists called out Raihanul Islam, a student of the 44th batch of the department of Urban and Regional Planning of Jahangirnagar University. Under the pretext of teaching him "manners", Raihan was subjected to physical and mental torture throughout the night. At one point, he was told to act like a chicken and a chair. When his legs trembled while acting like a chicken, he was beaten brutally with a pipe. Chhatra League activist Zahidul Islam Sajal and some of his loyal followers took part in this attack.
- On 17 February 2020, around 3 PM at the central cafeteria, a Chhatra League leader beat up a student, and a female friend who was with the student was also harassed by a Chhatra League activist.
- On 18 October 2022, senior second-year Chhatra League members of Sheikh Mujibur Rahman Hall verbally abused students with obscene language under the name of teaching "manners". They also subjected them to various forms of mental harassment and beatings.
- On 21 March 2023, in guestroom number 317 of Mir Mosharraf Hossain Hall, Chhatra League leader, Mostafizur Rahman, slapped a junior student during a guestroom session, causing his ear to burst.
- On 19 June 2023, a student was tortured in the political block of Shaheed Salam-Barkat Hall of Jahangirnagar University.
- On 21 August 2023, journalist Asif Al Mamun, a correspondent for the news agency, UNB, was beaten on suspicion of recording a video of guestroom torture. After he identified himself as a journalist, he was beaten again.
- On 4 February 2024, room number 137 of Mir Mosharraf Hossain Hall was used as a torture cell. A decorator and businessman from Zirani was detained and tortured in the room, his wife was called over the phone and brought there. A group of Chhatra League members then brutally gang-raped the woman in the forested area near the hall.

=== Bangladesh Agricultural University ===
- On the night of 31 March 2014, in Ashraful Haque Hall, Chhatra League activists brutally beat up Sad Ibn Momtaz, leaving him critically injured. Later, he died at a clinic in Mymensingh city.
- On 5 January 2019, during the orientation session at Bangladesh Agricultural University, students were treated normally until midnight. But after 12:00 am, they were taken to the guestroom. Around 50 to 60 first-year students were there. The senior Chhatra League members had cricket stumps and machetes in their hands. The first-year students were subjected to various forms of ragging and mental torture throughout the night, including being forced to sit like chickens and kneel down.
- On 27 January 2020, several first-year students of Bangladesh Agricultural University were subjected to ragging and physical torture. On that night, in the TV room of Isha Khan Hall, some leaders and activists of Chhatra League physically and mentally abused the first-year students of the same hall.
- On 13 December 2022, Md. Habibur Rahman, a student of the Faculty of Veterinary Science at Bangladesh Agricultural University, was called to the guestroom on suspicion of being involved with Shibir and had his phone searched. Later, several Chhatra League leaders inflicted brutal torture on him. They slapped him several times over the ear and beat him with a rod. His eardrum burst, and he had to stay in bed for seven days. Another student named Md. Touhidul Islam was beaten on the knee with a rod by 12 to 13 Chhatra League members. As a result, Touhidul fell sick and started vomiting. He was admitted to the hospital.
- Rifat Bin Shayekuzzaman, a residential student of Ashraful Haque Hall of the same university, was tortured in the guestroom. He was kicked in the chest 10 to 12 times, slapped on the ear which burst his eardrum, and later was mercilessly beaten with a hot stick.
- On 23 November 2023, at midnight in the guestroom of Taposi Rabeya Hall of Bangladesh Agricultural University, a student was tortured. The student named Mursalin Mustaki Mafi was called to the guestroom and verbally abused and physically tortured for protesting the poor quality and price hike of dining food.

=== Islamic University ===
- The oppression of Chhatra League became known nationwide through the physical and mental abuse of Fulpori Khatun at Kushtia Islamic University. Almost every dormitory in the university has a torture cell, known as "torture room".
- On 21 July 2016, Chhatra League leaders severely beat Shahid Ahmed, a student of the department of Law, and Abu Saleh, a student of the department of English, at the main gate of the university on suspicion of being affiliated with Jamaat-Shibir, They fled the campus out of fear.
- On 22 October 2017, Rimon, a second-year student of the department of Law, was interrogated near the central library on suspicion of being a Shibir activist, and then was severely beaten and tortured.
- In September 2018, Chhatra League called Jubayer, an activist of a rival political group, labeled him as Shibir, and tortured him severely. Chhatra League members, Bipul Khan, Tasnim-e-Tariq Abir, Mosharraf Hossain Neel, Fazle Rabbi and Shafayet Islam Sagar participated in the torture. The victim was kicked, punched, and beaten brutally with steel pipes.
- On 5 September 2022, 8 to 10 Chhatra League activists beat up Ikramul Islam of the department of Da'wah and Islamic Studies and Zaman of the Al-Hadith and Islamic Studies department on allegations of affiliations with Jamaat-Shibir, and expelled them from the campus.
- On 21 June 2023, a student in the common room of Lalon Shah Hall was beaten by several Chhatra League activists of that hall.
- On 7 February 2024, in room 136 of Lalon Shah Hall at Kushtia Islamic University, some Chhatra League leaders stripped a student naked and tortured him. They even made him take a vow with his nose touching the ground and hit him with rods.
- On 24 February 2024, a student was stripped naked and tortured, sexually harassed in the guest room of Lalon Shah Hall. The Human Rights Commission protested this incident.
- On 16 July 2024, Mahfuz Ul Haque, a student of the department of Law, was threatened in his room for participating in the quota reform movement and was beaten up.

=== Jessore University of Science and Technology ===
- On 11 June 2024, a student at Jessore University of Science and Technology was tortured all night and was threatened with being shot.

=== Mawlana Bhashani University of Science and Technology ===
- On 8 March 2019, a student named Fahim Ahmed, a student of Bio Chemistry and Molecular Biology department residing in Jononeta Abdul Mannan hall, was brutally tortured by BCL organizing secretary Sayem Ali Sunny and 5 other students, breaking his right hand.

== Protests and reactions ==
When allegations of guestroom torture were raised against Sheikh Abdus Salam, the Vice Chancellor of the Islamic University in Kushtia, he gave assurances of punishment for the perpetrators. To combat guestroom torture, bullying, ragging, and harassment of students, the Ministry of Education issued the "Policy on Prevention of Bullying and Ragging 2023" and published it in the form of a gazette.

On 22 November 2023, a student held a three-hour sit-in program at Teacher-Student Centre (TSC) at DU in protest against student torture in the guest room. Former UGC Chairman Professor Nazrul Islam stated that, if necessary, laws should be enacted to swiftly put an end to this culture of torturing students. At Jahangirnagar University, the Students' Union organized a protest rally demanding an end to the guestroom and mass-room culture. Islami Chhatra Shibir condemned the incident at the Islamic University where a student was stripped naked and tortured. On 15 March 2022, the Student Rights Council held a sit-in program demanding a law against guest room torture. To end the guestroom culture, Islami Chhatra Andolan Bangladesh organized a protest rally, brief assembly, and prayer gathering at the base of the Raju Sculpture.

The Anti-Terrorism Student Unity Alliance, a coalition of 12 student organizations led by DUCSU Vice President Nurul Haque Nur, held a protest rally and gathering on campus. In protest of the oppression and torture of students by the Chhatra League across the country, Rajshahi University teacher Farid Uddin Khan began an indefinite hunger strike.

Due to the continued torture of students since 2018, the general public of Bangladesh initiated a petition on the website Change.org to designate Chhatra League as a "terrorist organization". In 2019, one of Bangladesh's prominent newspapers, the Dhaka Tribune, labeled the organization a "brand of shame." Following repeated attacks on dissenting student groups, on 26 May 2022, eight left-wing student organizations in Bangladesh declared the Chhatra League a "terrorist organization."

== See also ==
- Ragging
- Bangladesh Islami Chhatra Shibir
- Aynaghar
- Human rights in Bangladesh
- Criticism of Awami League
