= 2017 in Bangladesh =

- Centuries: 20th; 21st
- Decades: 1990s; 2000s; 2010s; 2020s
- See also: Other events of 2017; List of years in Bangladesh

2017 (MMXVII) was a common year starting on Sunday of the Gregorian calendar, the 2017th year of the Common Era (CE) and Anno Domini (AD) designations, the 17th year of the 3rd millennium and the 21st century, and the 8th year of the 2010s decade.

The year 2017 was the 46th year after the independence of Bangladesh. It was also the fourth year of the third term of the Government of Sheikh Hasina.

== Incumbents ==
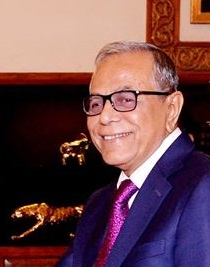
Abdul
Hamid

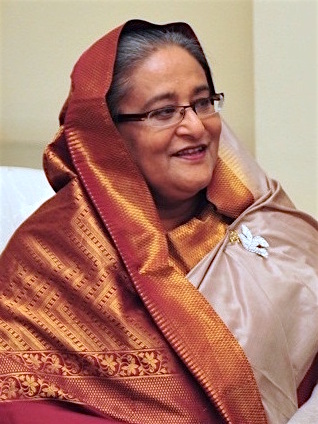
Sheikh
Hasina

- President: Mohammad Abdul Hamid
- Prime Minister: Sheikh Hasina
- Chief Justice: Surendra Kumar Sinha

== Demography ==
Demographic Indicators for Bangladesh in 2017
| Population, total | 159,685,421 |
| Population density (per km^{2}) | 1226.7 |
| Population growth (annual %) | 1.1% |
| Male to Female Ratio (every 100 Female) | 102.6 |
| Urban population (% of total) | 35.9% |
| Birth rate, crude (per 1,000 people) | 18.5 |
| Death rate, crude (per 1,000 people) | 5.5 |
| Mortality rate, under 5 (per 1,000 live births) | 34 |
| Life expectancy at birth, total (years) | 72.1 |
| Fertility rate, total (births per woman) | 2.1 |

== Economy ==
Key Economic Indicators for Bangladesh in 2017
National Income
| | Current US$ | Current BDT | % of GDP |
|---|---|---|---|
| GDP | $249.7 billion | | |
| GDP growth (annual %) | 7.3% | | |
| GDP per capita | $1,563.8 | | |
| Agriculture, value added | $33.5 billion | | |
| Industry, value added | $69.3 billion | | |
| Services, etc., value added | $133.5 billion | | |
Balance of Payment
| | Current US$ | Current BDT | % of GDP |
| Current account balance | -$6.0 billion | | |
| Imports of goods and services | $56.8 billion | | |
| Exports of goods and services | $39,170.4 million | | |
| Foreign direct investment, net inflows | $1,810.4 million | | |
| Personal remittances, received | $13,501.9 million | | |
| Total reserves (includes gold) at year end | $33,431.5 million | | |
| Total reserves in months of imports | 6.8 | | |

Note: For 2017, the average official exchange rate for BDT was 80.44 per US$.

== Events ==
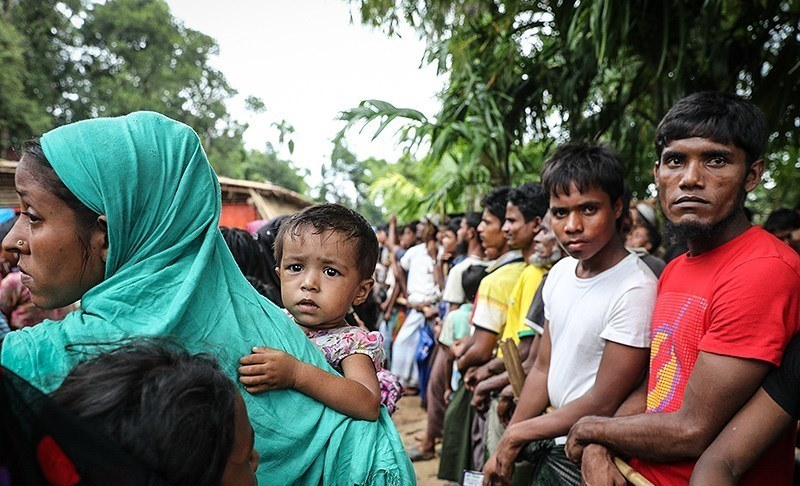
Rohingya refugees in Bangladesh in October 2017

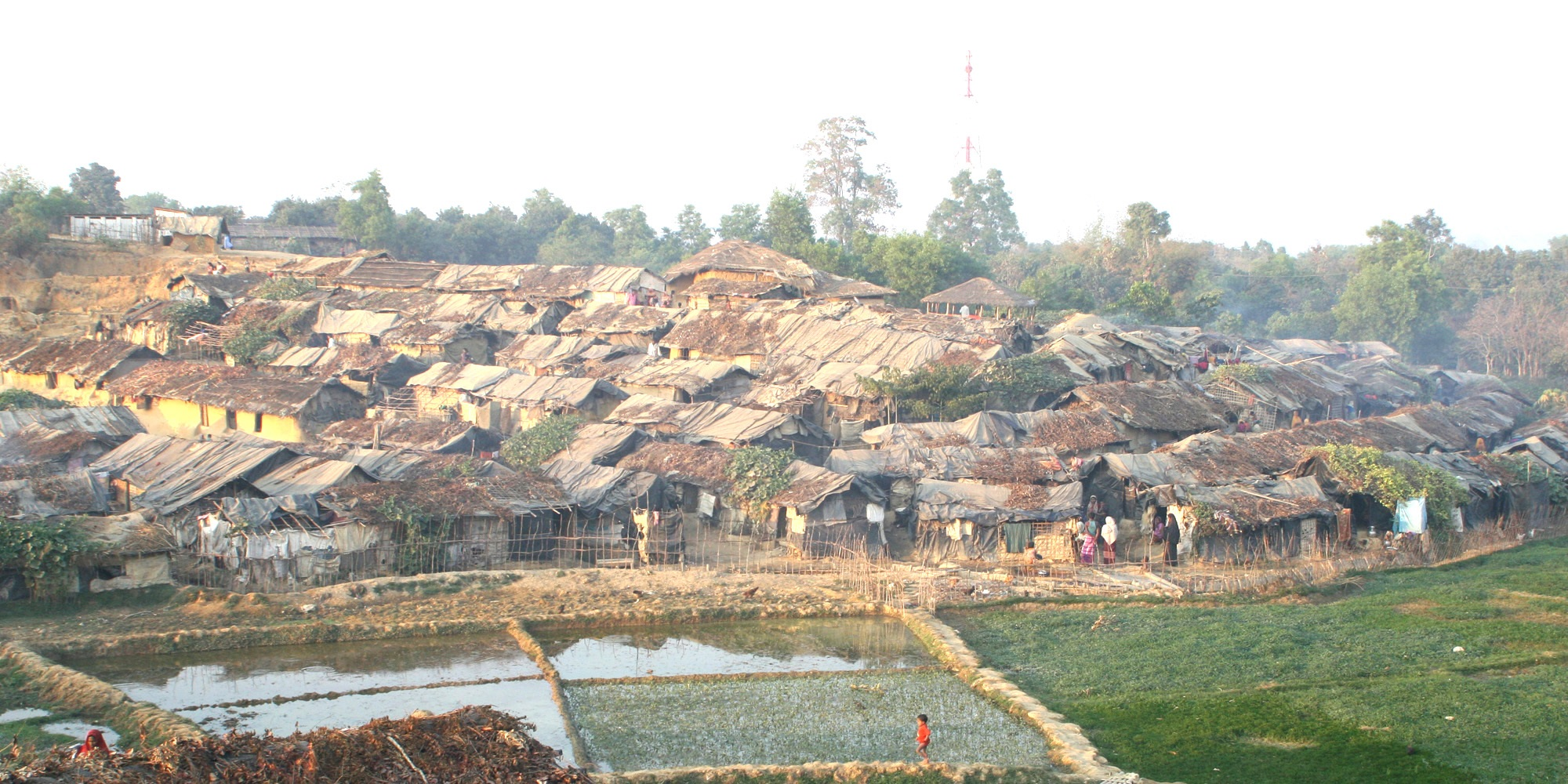
Kutupalong Refugee Camp

- 23 March – Bangladesh Police surround a suspected militant hideout in South Surma Upazila, Sylhet, Bangladesh. The police unit is reinforced with personnel from a Rapid Action Battalion the next day.
- 25 March – Operation Twilight is launched by the 1st Para Commando Battalion of the Bangladesh Army under the command of Major General Anwarul Momen, GOC 17th Infantry Division in Jalalabad Cantonment. First, the security forces establish a three-kilometre perimeter around the militant hideout. Then the operation is launched on Saturday morning at 8 am. Two militants are killed in the initial attack, one of whom detonates a suicide vest. The commandos rescue 78 civilians who had been trapped in the building since Thursday.
- 26 March – While Operation Twilight is in progress, militants bomb a crowd of about 500–600 onlookers gathered near the cordon perimeter, which was about 400 metres from the militant hideout.
- 9 April – Prime Minister Sheikh Hasina makes a landmark visit to neighboring India and signs 22 new deals and MoUs with India, taking the Indo-BD bilateral relationships to a new height. This also includes a defense cooperation, originally proposed by India.
- 30 May – More than 300,000 people are evacuated in Bangladesh as Cyclone Mora approaches.
- 13 June – At least 152 people are dead and dozens are missing in landslides caused by days of heavy monsoonal rain in Bangladesh.
- 18 August – Flooding in South Asia has displaced tens of thousands of people and resulted in an estimated 500 deaths across India, Bangladesh, and Nepal.
- 27 August – Dozens of Rohingya Muslims fleeing renewed violence in Rakhine State are detained by Bangladeshi and Burmese authorities after they attempt to cross the border from Myanmar to Bangladesh. Many were en route to Kutupalong Refugee Camp, a refugee camp in Ukhia, Bangladesh, mostly inhabited by Rohingya refugees.
- 31 August – Twenty-six bodies of women and children are recovered after three boats carrying ethnic Rohingya fleeing violence in Myanmar sink in the Naf River in Bangladesh's Cox's Bazar District.
- 5 September – More than 123,000 Rohingya refugees have fled Myanmar and crossed into Bangladesh due to escalating violence by the Myanmar Army.
- 6 September – Bangladesh accuses the Myanmar Army of laying landmines on the border between both countries to prevent the return of fleeing Rohingya refugees. Myanmar denies the Bangladeshi claims.
- 12 September – Bangladeshi Prime Minister Sheikh Hasina accuses the Burmese government of "atrocities" against the Rohingya people and calls for these alleged atrocities to stop.
- 16 September – Bangladesh announces plans to build a giant refugee camp the size of a small city to house nearly 700,000 Rohingya refugees.
- 28 September – At least 14 Rohingya people, including 10 children, fleeing violence in Myanmar are killed when their boat apparently hits a submerged object and capsizes just yards from the Bangladesh coast.
- 8 October – A refugee boat en route to Bangladesh from Myanmar capsizes, resulting in at least 12 deaths.
- 19 November – Chinese delegates visiting the Burmese capital of Naypyidaw propose a three-phase plan to resolve the conflict in Myanmar's Rakhine State. The governments of Myanmar and Bangladesh expressed support for the plan, which included repatriating refugees that have fled from violence in Rakhine State.
- 23 November – Bangladesh's Foreign Minister A. H. Mahmood Ali and Myanmar's State Counsellor Aung San Suu Kyi agree to return Rohingya refugees from Bangladesh to Myanmar in a two-month period. (The Australian)
- 2 December – Pope Francis ends his six-day trip to Myanmar and Bangladesh by visiting the Rohingya refugees in Dhaka.

=== Awards and recognitions ===
==== Independence Day Award ====
The award was given to fifteen people and an organization.

| Recipients | Area | Note |
|---|---|---|
| Group Captain (retd) Shamsul Alam Bir Uttam | independence and liberation war | |
| Ashraful Alam | independence and liberation war | |
| Nazmul Huq | independence and liberation war | posthumous |
| Syed Mohsin Ali | independence and liberation war | posthumous |
| NM Nazmul Ahsan | independence and liberation war | posthumous |
| Faizur Rahman Ahmed | independence and liberation war | posthumous |
| Bangladesh Air Force | independence and liberation war | |
| Professor AHM Touhidul Anowar Chawdhury | medical science | |
| Rabeya Khatun | literature | |
| Golam Samdani Koraishi | literature | |
| Enamul Huq | culture | |
| Bazlur Rahman Badal | culture | |
| Khalil Kazi OBE | social service | |
| Shamsuzzaman Khan | research and training | |
| Lalit Mohan Nath | research and training | posthumous |
| Mohammad Asaduzzaman | public administration | posthumous |

==== Ekushey Padak ====
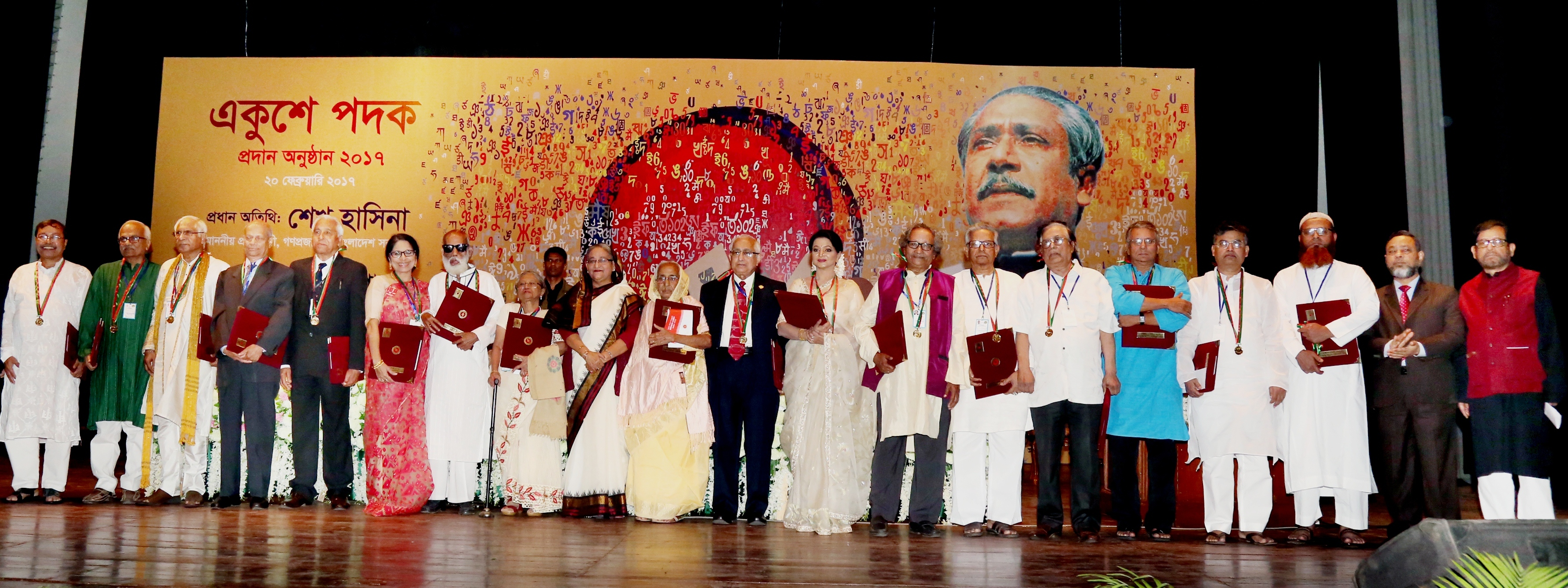

The award was given to 17 persons.

1. Sharifa Khatun, language movement
2. Shushama Das, music
3. Julhas Uddin Ahmed, music
4. Ustad Azizul Islam, music
5. Tanvir Mokammel, film
6. Syed Abdullah Khalid, sculpture
7. Sara Zaker, acting
8. Abul Momen, journalism
9. Syed Akram Hossain, research
10. Alamgir Muhammad Serajuddin, education
11. Jamilur Reza Choudhury, science and technology
12. Mahmud Hassan, social welfare
13. Omar Ali, language and literature
14. Sukumar Barua, language and literature
15. Swadesh Roy, journalism
16. Shamim Ara Nipa, choreography
17. Rahmatullah Al Mahmud Selim, music.

=== Sports ===
- Football:
  - The "Under-18" team became runner-up in the SAFF U-18 Championship held in Bhutan, and the "Under-15" team secured the third position in the SAFF U-15 Championship held in Nepal.
  - Dhaka Abahani won the Premier League title.
- Cricket:
  - The Bangladesh cricket team toured India in February to play one Test match. India won the Test match by 208 runs.
  - Later, Bangladesh toured Sri Lanka in March and April. The tour consisted of a series of two Test matches, three One Day Internationals (ODIs), and two Twenty20 internationals (T20Is). The Test series was drawn 1–1, with Bangladesh winning the second match by 4 wickets. It was their first win against Sri Lanka in a Test match. The victory was their ninth win in Tests and their fourth overseas. The ODI series was drawn 1–1, with the second of the three matches ending in a no result due to rain. The T20I series also finished 1–1.
  - Bangladesh competed in the Ireland Tri-Nation Series in May against Ireland and New Zealand. They won 2 of their 4 ODIs in the tournament.
  - The Australia cricket team toured Bangladesh in August and September to play two Test matches. Bangladesh won the first Test by 20 runs, their first-ever victory against Australia in a Test match. Australia won the second Test by 7 wickets, therefore drawing the series 1–1.
  - Then the Bangladesh team toured South Africa in September and October to play two Tests, three One Day Internationals (ODIs), and two Twenty20 International (T20I) matches. It was Bangladesh's first tour of South Africa in nine years. South Africa won the Test series 2–0, the ODI series 3–0, and the T20I series 2–0.

== Deaths ==
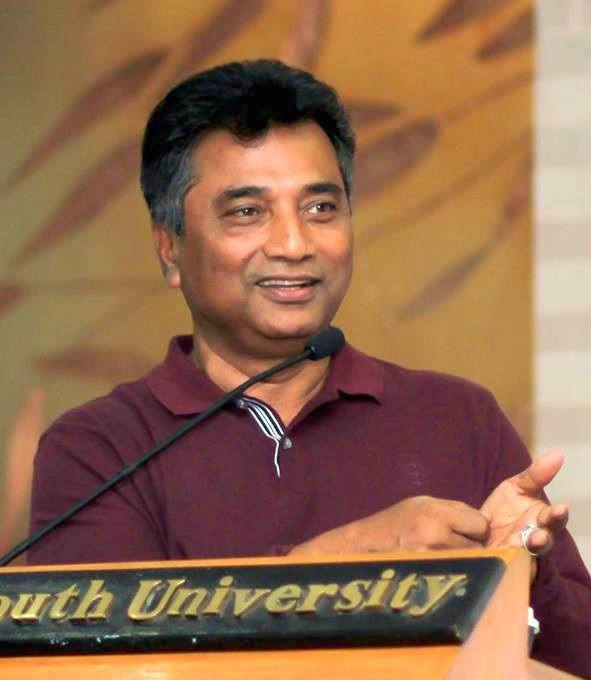
Annisul Huq (1952–2017)

- 17 January – M. M. Ruhul Amin, former Chief Justice (b. 1942).
- 23 January – Mirza Ali Behrouze Ispahani, businessman (b. 1950)
- 5 February – Suranjit Sengupta, politician (b. 1945).
- 19 March – Zubaida Gulshan Ara, writer (b. 1943/44)
- 27 March – Mizu Ahmed, actor (b. 1953)
- 28 March – Ibne Mizan, film director (b. 1930)
- 21 April – Lucky Akhand, singer (b. 1956)
- 6 May – Mihir Kumar Nandi, singer (b. 1945)
- 17 May – Faruq Ahmed Choudhury, diplomat (b. 1934)
- 6 June – Latifur Rahman, former Chief Justice and Chief Advisor (b. 1936)
- 27 June – Sudhin Das, musician (b. 1930)
- 28 June – Nazmul Huda Bachchu, actor (b. 1938)
- 1 August – Harunur Rashid Khan Monno, industrialist and politician (b. 1932)
- 21 August – Abdur Razzak, actor (b. 1942)
- 30 August – Abdul Jabbar, singer (b. 1938)
- 15 September – Dwijen Sharma, writer (b. 1929)
- 19 October – Father Marino Rigon, missionary priest (b. 1925)
- 24 October – M. K. Anwar, politician (b. 1933)
- 3 November – Abdur Rahman Biswas, politician and former president (b. 1926)
- 24 November – Bari Siddiqui, singer-songwriter and folk musician (b. 1954)
- 19 November – Akhtar Hameed Siddiqui, politician and former deputy speaker of the Jatiya Sangsad (b. 1947)
- 26 November – Rahija Khanam Jhunu, dancer (b. 1943)
- 29 November – Aminul Islam, academic (b. 1935)
- 30 November - Annisul Huq, entrepreneur, TV presenter, and sitting mayor of Dhaka North City Corporation (b. 1952)
- 15 December – A. B. M. Mohiuddin Chowdhury, politician and former city mayor of Chittagong (b. 1944)

== See also ==
- 2010s in Bangladesh
- List of Bangladeshi films of 2017
- Timeline of Bangladeshi history
