= Muhammad Muhsin Alam =

Bangladeshi general

Muhsin Alam
- Born: 22 November 1971 (age 54); Jamalpur, East Pakistan, Pakistan
- Education: Notre Dame College
- Military career
- Allegiance: Bangladesh
- Branch: Bangladesh Army
- Service years: 1991–2024
- Rank: Brigadier General
- Unit: East Bengal Regiment
- Commands: Commander of Para Commando Brigade; Principal of BKSP; Commander of 111th Infantry Brigade
- Conflicts: MONUSCO; UNAMID
- Awards: Maroon Parachute Wing

Muhammad Muhsin Alam (Note: ndc, psc) (born 22 November 1971) (Note: Brigade Commander) is a retired one-star officer and former commander of the Para Commando Brigade of the Bangladesh Army. Alam also served in the Democratic Republic of the Congo as the northern sector commander of MONUSCO.

== Early life and education ==
Alam was born in Jamalpur of then East Pakistan in 1971. He completed his secondary school certification at Hazarbari High School and higher secondary certification from Notre Dame College. He enlisted in the Bangladesh Military Academy in 1989 and was commissioned in the East Bengal Regiment in June 1991 with the 24th BMA Long Course. Alam has undergone advanced training courses at para commando from the School of Infantry and Tactics, combat tracking from the Royal Military College at Malaysia and the free fall seminar from PLA airborne school under the Army Special Operations Academy at China. (Note: Army Commando Course or ACC. A six-month-long special forces induction course for members of Bangladesh Armed forces) (Note: Tracking course to find out insurgents movement in jungle environment in Pulada, Malaysia) Alam also attended the UN integrated mission seminar with the Canadian peacekeeping force at CFB Halifax, Canada. (Note: From PLA Airborne School) (Note: Pearson Peace Keeping Centre, Nova Scotia, Canada)

Alam is a graduate of Defence Services Command and Staff College and the National Defence College. (Note: Class of 2003) He completed his master's degree in Defence Studies from National University.

== Military career ==
Alam served as garrison staff officer (grade-2) at 46th Independent Infantry Brigade and the principal of Bangladesh Krira Shikkha Protishtan. He also instructed a considerable length at School of Infantry and Tactics. He commanded two infantry battalions in Chittagong Hill Tracts and one infantry brigade. On 2019 Alam was appointed as commander of Para Commando Brigade. (Note: Multiple references:)

As commander of para commando brigade, Alam has participated in Advanced Marksmanship seminar joint by the United States Army, and a six-day long Exercise Cope South by United States Air Force on 6 February 2020 along with a 24-day Joint Counter-Terrorism Training Exercise Bengal Brit consigned with the British Army. He furthermore conducted Exercise Tiger Shark with the American army on 24 September 2020. Under his directive, a week-long customized training was rendered to members of the Crisis Response Team of the Bangladesh Police in June 2021. Alam was the lead sky diver for the 50th Victory Day parade ceremony on 16 December 2021. He received the chief of army staff's commendation on 27 August 2023. Alam went to leave per retirement in December 2024 while serving as director of Bangladesh Machine Tools Factory. (Note: Multiple references:)

=== United Nations peacekeeping missions ===
Alam served under United Nations peacekeeping forces twice. First as with Bangladesh battalion consigned with UNAMID in Darfur. Alam was designated as commander, Northern sector under MONUSCO in Democratic Republic of the Congo. He assumed office on 13 January 2022. For conducting successful operation against armed groups within the shortest possible time Alam received consecutively four letters of commendations for four separate operations. Alam furthermore maintained a close liaison with the Armed Forces of the Democratic Republic of the Congo. He had several calls on with the Congolese military region commander and the governor of Ituri Province. (Note: Multiple references:) As the UN commander, Alam faced admirations from the high command for controlling the Anti-MONUSCO protests of Ituri province in which anti-MONUSCO ideals spread throughout the eastern D.R Congo on 25 July 2022. The agitated Congolese nationals vandalized MONUSCO installations and residences of North Kivu and South Kivu. The protestors violently attacked MONUSCO bases in Goma, Beni and Butembo. The forces headquarters, hospital, the central logistics base, the Bangladesh army engineers company, and BANATU were overrun by the frantic protestors. The fierce protest lasted for almost three weeks, during which the civilians could cause remarkable damage to UN personnel, materials, and information in these areas. The movement claimed the lives of 36 people, including three MONUSCO members. But no anti-MONUSCO demonstration occurred in Ituri province, the northern section of MONUSCO. He also provided further humanitarian affords under the Blue beret to ameliorate Ituri province and its jurisdiction. (Note: Multiple references:)

== Personal life ==
Alam is married and has a son. He is a keen golfer. He also participated in a humanitarian aid drive amid recent COVID-19 pandemic. He is an extensive traveler and has visited many countries in both an official and personal capacity.

== Awards and decorations ==
Master Parachutist badge
Freefall Parachutist Badge
Bangladesh Army Para Commando Bravet
Cheetah Insignia
