= Mohammed Jubayer Salehin =

Major General of the Bangladesh Army

Jubayer Salehin BSP, SUP
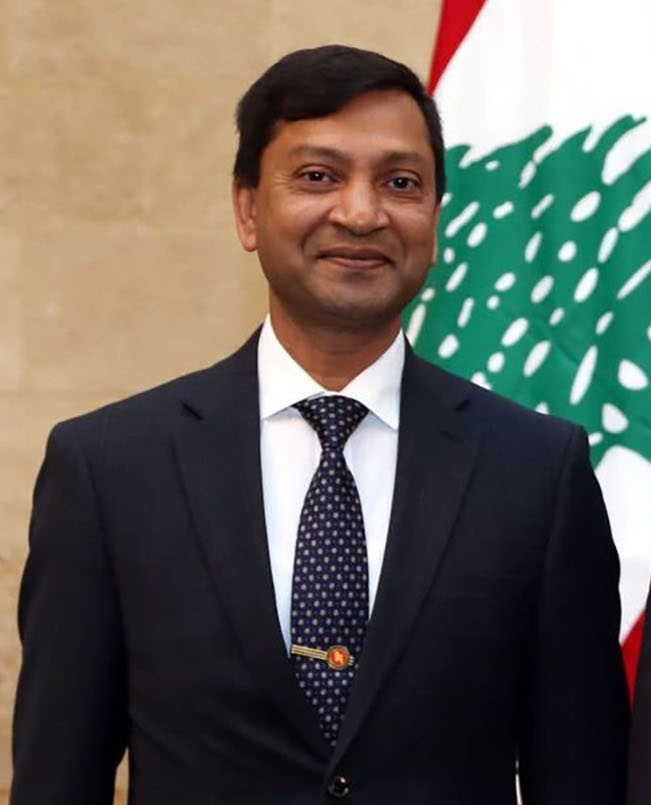
- Salehin in 2024

Bangladesh Ambassador to Lebanon
- In office 1 June 2025 – 19 January 2026
- President: Mohammed Shahabuddin
- Prime Minister: Muhammad Yunus (acting)
- Preceded by: Javed Tanveer Khan

Personal details
- Born: 1 February 1970 (age 56) Chuadanga, East Pakistan, Pakistan
- Awards: Sena Utkorsho Padak(SUP); Bishishto Seba Padak (BSP)

Military service
- Allegiance: Bangladesh
- Branch/service: Bangladesh Army
- Years of service: 1988–2026
- Rank: Major General
- Unit: Corps of Engineers
- Commands: Director General of Bangladesh Institute of International and Strategic Studies; Adjutant General at Army Headquarters; Engineer-in-chief at Army Headquarters; Commandant of Defence Services Command and Staff College; GOC of 17th Infantry Division; Commander of 24th Engineers Construction Brigade; Commander of 305th Infantry Brigade
- Battles/wars: Chittagong Hill Tracts Conflict

Mohammed Jubayer Salehin (Note: BSP, SUP, ndu, psc) is a retired two star officer of the Bangladesh Army and former Bangladeshi ambassador to Lebanon. He is the former director general of Bangladesh Institute of International and Strategic Studies. He is the antecedent adjutant general and Engineer-in-Chief at army headquarters and GOC of 17th Infantry Division.

== Early life and education ==
Jubayer was born on 1970 at Chuadanga, then part of Kushtia District at East Pakistan, Pakistan (now, Khulna Division, Bangladesh) to Ansar Ali, an associate professor of Chuadanga Government College. He finished high school from the Cumilla Cadet College and enlisted to Bangladesh Military Academy at 1986. He was commissioned in June 1988 at the corps of engineers with 19th BMA long course. He is a graduate of Defence Services Command and Staff College, National Defence University at China and the United States Army Engineer School. Jubayer furthermore completed a Master of Engineering from the Bangladesh University of Engineering and Technology.

== Military career ==
Jubayer was a brigade major of an infantry brigade during the Chittagong Hill Tracts insurgency. He commanded a riverine engineers battalion, an engineers construction battalion, an engineers construction brigade at Dhaka Cantonment and additionally an infantry brigade at Bandarban Cantonment. He furthermore, served as the chief engineer of Dhaka North City Corporation. Jubayer was promoted to major general on 2019 and was posted as the general officer commanding of 17th Infantry Division and area commander Sylhet area. He was later transferred to a non-combatant assignment, serving as the commandant of Defence Services Command and Staff College on 2020. Soon after he was posted to army headquarters initially as engineer-in-chief and later the adjutant general of army.

On 24 August 2021, He led a delegation for a joint warfare workshop in company of the Sri Lankan Army with the orchestration of Sri Lankan defence chief and army commander general Shavendra Silva and his compatriot, the commandant of Sri Lankan Defence Services Command and Staff College, major general Nishantha Herath. Jubayer has been awarded the Army Excellence Medal (SUP) for his extraordinary service in Army. As the adjutant general, he was the former vice chairman of the Trust Bank and Astha Life Insurance Company Limited. He was also the former governing body member of National Defence College and Bangladesh Public Administration Training Centre. On 2024, Jubayer tenured as the director general of Bangladesh Institute of International and Strategic Studies.

On 20 April 2025, Jubayer was appointed as the ambassador to Lebanon under the Ministry of Foreign Affairs. On 19 January 2026, he was called off from Beirut and brought back to Bangladesh Army. He was later given a farewell at Army HQ on 28 January, before going into LPR on 31 January.

== Personal life ==
Jubayer Salehin is married to Samia diwan. He is a father of two daughters.
