= 2017 South Surma Upazila bombings =

Terrorist incident in Bangladesh

- Location: South Surma Upazila, Sylhet, Bangladesh
- Date: 25 March 2017
- Target: Civilians and police officers
- Attack type: Terrorist attack
- Weapon: Explosive belts
- Deaths: 11 (including 4 suicide bombers)
- Injuries: 40+
- Perpetrator: ISIL
- Assailant: 4 suicide bombers

The 2017 South Surma Upazila bombings was a combined police and army raid of a suspected militant hideout in South Surma Upazila, Sylhet, Bangladesh, on 25 March 2017. During the raid, the militants targeted the Bangladesh Armed Forces who were surrounding the militant occupied compound in Sylhet. There were two suicide bombings which killed four civilians and two police officers and wounded more than 40, some critically. An army lieutenant colonel later died from his injuries. Bomb explosions and gunfire was reported when the military launched Operation Twilight to clear the militant hideout. ISIL claimed responsibility however, Home Minister Asaduzzaman Khan Kamal denied the ISIL claims and blamed the local terrorist group Jama’atul Mujahideen Bangladesh for the attacks. Finally the Bangladesh Army neutralised four militants at the suspected hideout.

== Background ==
On Thursday, 23 March 2017, the Bangladesh Police surrounded a suspected militant hideout in South Surma Upazila, Sylhet, Bangladesh. The hideout was located in a housing complex which consisted of two apartment buildings. The police unit was reinforced with personnel from Rapid Action Battalion on the Friday. On Saturday, the 1st Para Commando Battalion took charge of operations.

== Operation Twilight ==
Operation Twilight was launched by the 1st Para Commando Battalion of the Bangladesh Army under the command of Major General Anwarul Momen, GOC 17th Infantry Division in Jalalabad Cantonment. First the security forces established a three kilometre perimeter around the militant hideout. Then the operation was launched on Saturday morning at 8 am. Two militants were killed in the initial attack, one of whom detonated a suicide vest. The commandos rescued 78 civilians who had been trapped in the building since Thursday. The militants had planted improvised explosive devices (IEDs) all over the building which slowed down the operation. The main gate of the building was blocked by a refrigerator with an IED booby trap attached to it. Army spokesman, Brigadier General Fakhrul Ahsan, initially reported that the operation would take more time because of the presence of scattered IEDs in strategic points inside the building. “We used a rocket launcher to punch a hole through the wall. We used explosives but those didn’t work out. Then we used a Thai shell and successfully neutralised two militants,” Brigadier General Fakhrul said. The commandos arrived in armoured personnel carriers from their military base for the operation. The building had 30 apartments and 150 rooms, and the militants constantly changed their location. The operation was launched on Saturday morning at 8 am. The Commando unit was assisted by SWAT forces and Bangladesh police. Finally four militants were found dead at the hideout.

== Bombing ==
On 26 March, while Operation Twilight was in progress, militants bombed a crowd of about 500–600 onlookers gathered near the cordon perimeter, which was about 400 metres from the militant hideout. Two bombs were used in the attack. The first was thrown by two individuals from a motorcycle at 6.45 pm. The second was left in a bag containing vegetables and exploded at 7.55, after police and RAB personnel moved into the area following the first explosion. Six people, including two police officers, were killed in the explosions and 44 injured. Lieutenant Colonel Abul Kalam Azad, director of intelligence of RAB, was seriously injured in the second explosion. He was taken to Sylhet MAG Osmani Medical College for primary care. Then he was flown to the Combined Military Hospital in Dhaka. He was later flown to Singapore for better treatment, but died from his injuries. Police Inspector Monirul Islam of the bomb disposal squad and Inspector Abu Kawser were killed outright by the second explosion.
