= S. M. Matiur Rahman =

Retired Bangladeshi lieutenant general

S M Matiur Rahman
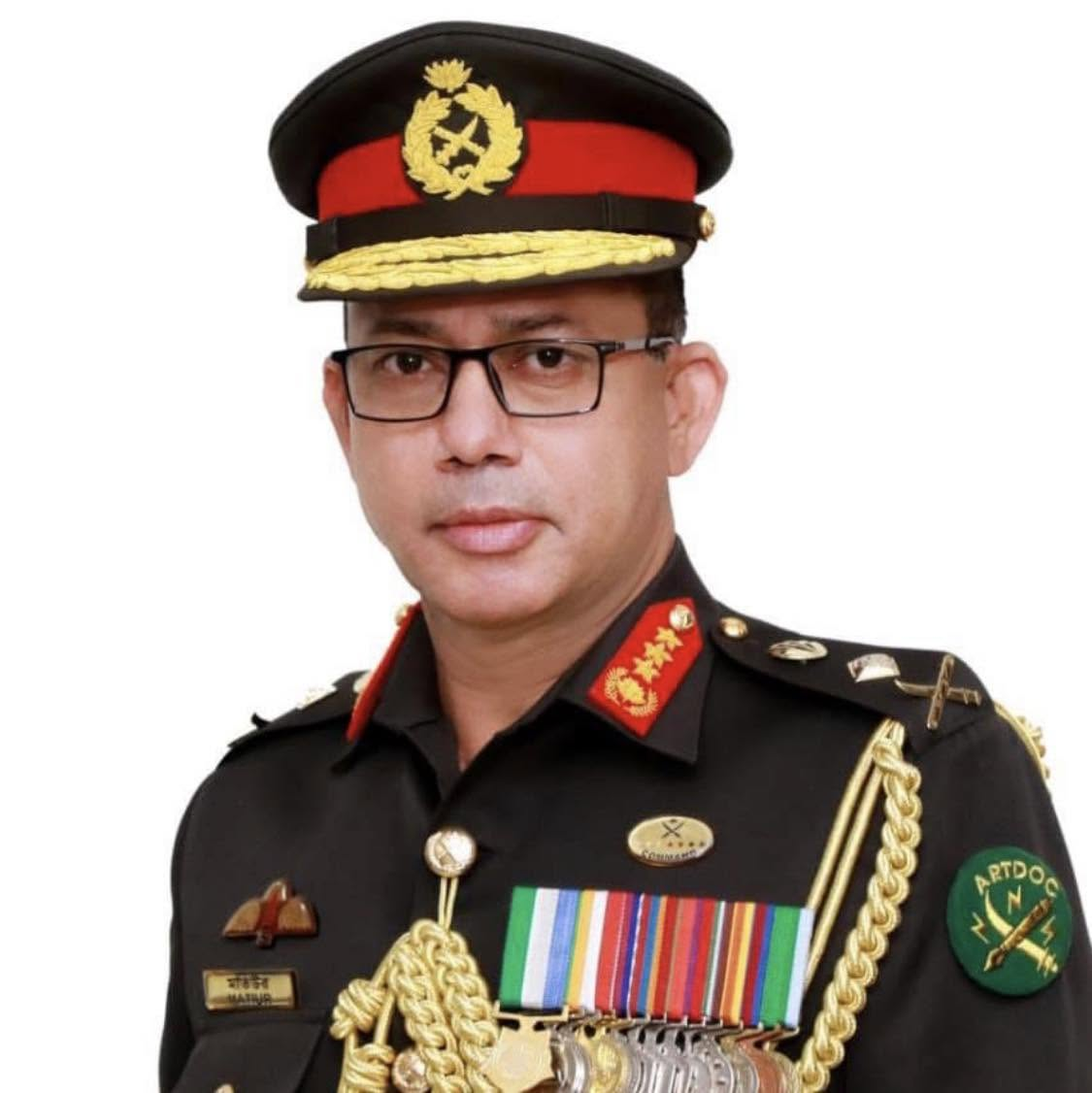
- Born: 24 November 1965 (age 60); Pangsha, East Pakistan, Pakistan
- Military career
- Allegiance: Bangladesh
- Branch: Bangladesh Army
- Service years: 1985–2023
- Rank: Lieutenant General
- Unit: Bangladesh Infantry Regiment
- Commands: GOC of ARTDOC; Adjutant General at Army Headquarters; GOC of 24th Infantry Division; GOC of 55th Infantry Division; Director of CTIB; Commander of 46th Independent Infantry Brigade; Commander of Para Commando Brigade; Additional DG (Operations) of RAB
- Conflicts: ONUCI; UNPROFOR
- Awards: Sena Utokorsho Padak(SUP); Oshamanno Sheba Padak(OSP); Maroon Parachute Wing
- Police career
- Unit: Rapid Action Battalion
- Allegiance: Bangladesh
- Branch: Bangladesh Police
- Service years: 2008–2010
- Rank: Additional Director General

S. M. Matiur Rahman (Note: OSP, SUP, afwc, psc) is a retired three-star general of the Bangladesh Army and antecedent general officer commanding of Army Training and Doctrine Command. Prior to that, he was general officer commanding of two infantry divisions and adjutant general at Army Headquarters. He was also the vice chairman of Trust Bank's board of directors and also served the Counter-Terrorism Intelligence Bureau of the Directorate General of Forces Intelligence as director.

== Education and training ==
Rahman was born on 24 November 1965 in Bhatshala village, Pangsha thana, Rajbari District, Pakistan. He enlisted in the Bangladesh Military Academy and commissioned in the 13th BMA long course in the 14th East Bengal Regiment in December 1985. In his initial career, he attended Airborne Course at Fort Benning in the United States and completed jump master course and Free Fall Course from the School of Infantry and Tactics. He also obtained his Jungle Operation Course from Royal Military College.

Rahman graduated from Defence Services Command and Staff College in 1998 and from National Defence College in 2009. He also obtained two master's degrees, one in defence studies in 2000 and another in war studies in 2007, both of which he acquired from National University, Bangladesh.

== Career ==
Rahman taught at the Bangladesh Military Academy, the Bangladesh Infantry Regimental Centre, and the School of Infantry and Tactics. As lieutenant colonel, he commanded one infantry battalion and one special forces battalion. He was also designated as garrison staff at the Directorate General of Forces Intelligence as a colonel. He was soon promoted to brigadier general and appointed as commander of the 46th Independent Infantry Brigade at Dhaka Cantonment. He was later transferred to the Counter-Terrorism Intelligence Bureau as director.

Rahman was upgraded to major general in 2013 and tenured as general officer commanding of the 55th Infantry Division and area commander, Jashore area.

He joined the army headquarters as adjutant general on 9 February 2016. In 2018, Rahman again tenured as general officer commanding of the 24th Infantry Division and Chittagong area commander. Rahman was promoted to lieutenant general in December 2020 and posted to ARTDOC, replacing Lieutenant General Shafiuddin Ahmed as general officer commanding. He went on leave per retirement on 23 November 2023. Currently he is the president of Army Golf Club, located in Dhaka Cantonment.

=== UN mission ===
Rahman participated in United Nations peacekeeping missions twice. He was former Yugoslavia military observer in 1995 and led a Bangladeshi military contingent in Ivory Coast in 2008.

=== Rapid Action Battalion ===
Rahman held the appointment of additional director general (operations) of the Rapid Action Battalion as colonel. He orchestrated the detainment of the suspected members of Jaish-e-Mohammed. This organization is one of the major terrorist outfits operative in South Asia.

== After the July Uprising ==
Following the July Uprising in 2024, the newly formed interim government established the Commission of Inquiry on Enforced Disappearances on 27 August 2024 to investigate the state-sponsored abductions and enforced disappearances during the tenure of Prime Minister Sheikh Hasina. In its preliminary findings, the commission identified 24 Hasina-era officials alleged to have been involved in enforced disappearances.

Among those named was S. M. Matiur Rahman, whose inclusion stemmed from his prior tenures in the Rapid Action Battalion and as director of the Counter Terrorism and Intelligence Bureau at the Directorate General of Forces Intelligence.

On 18 November 2024, the Security Services Division of the Ministry of Home Affairs directed the Department of Immigration and Passports to cancel the passports of all 24 identified officials to prevent them from departing the country.

== Personal life ==
Rahman is married to Syeda Towhida Aziz and is a father of two children.
