= Special Warfare Wing =

Special forces school of the Bangladesh Army

- বিশেষ যুদ্ধ শাখা
- Insignia of School of Infantry and Tactics
- Country: Bangladesh
- Branch: Bangladesh Army
- Type: Military training
- Role: Special warfare training
- Part of: School of Infantry and Tactics
- Garrison/HQ: Jalalabad Cantonment

The Special Warfare Wing (SWW) is an institution of the Bangladesh Army for training special forces.

Established as the Special Warfare School, in 1982, it was reorganized as the Special Warfare Wing of the School of Infantry and Tactics in Jalalabad Cantonment, Sylhet.

== See also ==
- Para-Commando Brigade (Bangladesh Army)
- Bangladesh Army Airborne School
