= Muhammad Jahangir Al Mustahidur Rahman =

Bangladesh Army General

Jahangir Al Mustahidur Rahman OSP
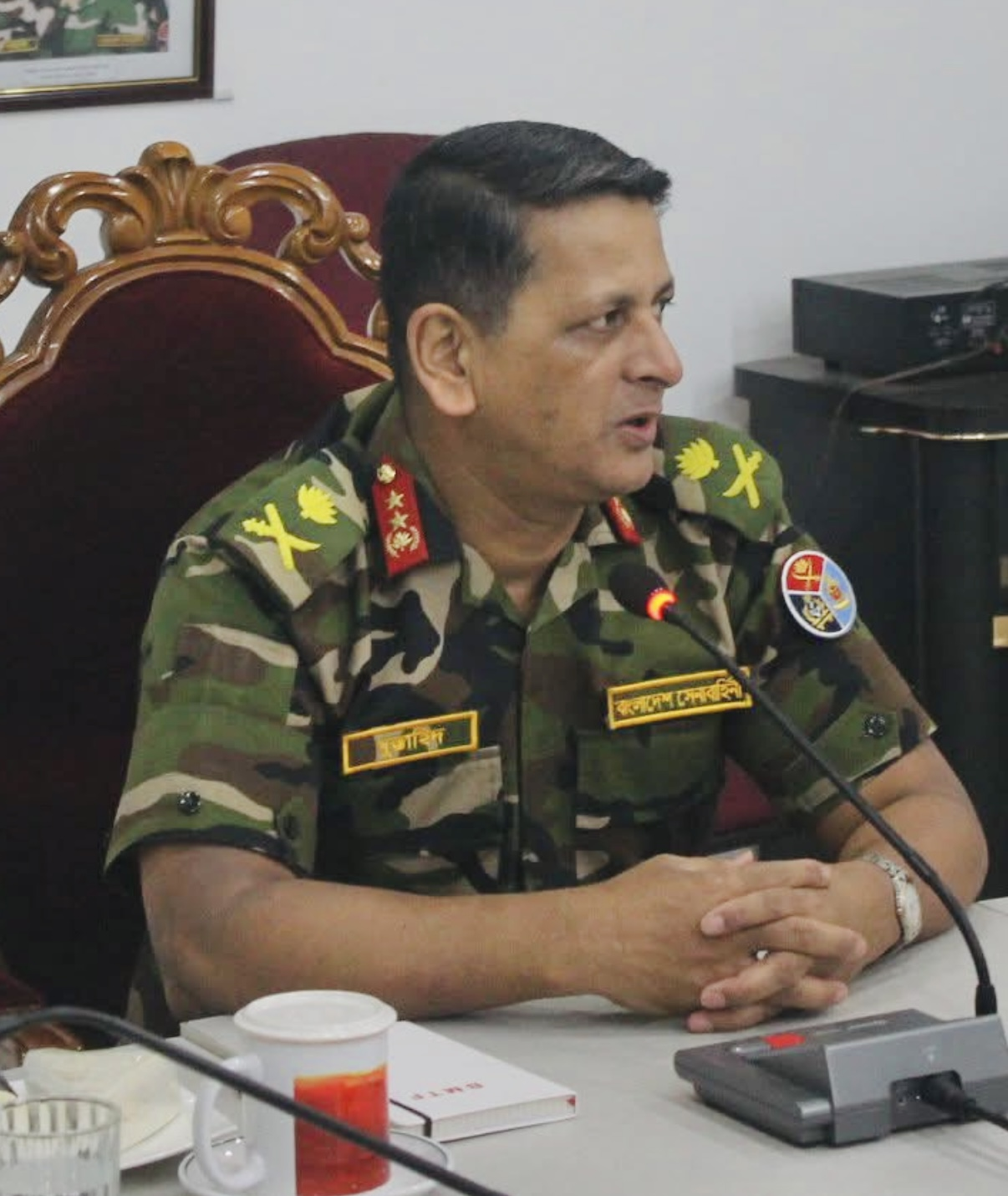
- Mustahidur in 2019

Bangladesh Ambassador to Lebanon
- In office 1 July 2020 – 5 July 2023
- President: Abdul Hamid; Mohammed Shahabuddin
- Prime Minister: Sheikh Hasina
- Preceded by: Abdul Motaleb Sarkar
- Succeeded by: Javed Tanveer Khan

Personal details
- Born: 5 July 1967 (age 59) Tangail, East Pakistan, Pakistan
- Education: National University
- Awards: Oshamanno Sheba Padak(OSP)

Military service
- Allegiance: Bangladesh
- Branch/service: Bangladesh Army
- Years of service: 1986 – 2023
- Rank: Major General
- Unit: Army Service Corps
- Commands: Chairman of Bangladesh Tea Board; Managing Director of Bangladesh Machine Tools Factory; Commandant of Army Service Corps Centre & School
- Battles/wars: UNIKOM; UNMIS; UMNIL

Muhammad Jahangir Al Mustahidur Rahman (Note: Bengali: মোহাম্মদ জাহাঙ্গীর আল মুস্তাহিদুর রহমান) (Note: OSP, psc) is a retired two star officer of the Bangladesh army and former ambassador of Bangladesh to Lebanon. He was the antecedent chairman of the Bangladesh Tea Board.

== Early life and education ==
Jahangir was born on 5 July 1967 in Tangail, of then East Pakistan, Pakistan (now, Dhaka Division, Bangladesh). He was enlisted in the Bangladesh Military Academy in 1984 and was commissioned with the 15th BMA long course in the Army Service Corps on 25 December 1986.

Jahangir completed his honours bachelor's and master's degrees from the National University of Bangladesh. He graduated from the Defence Services Command and Staff College and received command training in Pakistan.

== Military career ==
Jahangir commanded a supply and transport battalion and two station supply depots in Jessore and Jahangirabad, respectively. Jahangir additionally instructed at the Bangladesh Military Academy, taught and furthermore served as the commandant of the Army Service Corps Centre and School in Jahanabad Cantonment and was designated as the director of supply and transport and also assistant military secretary at army headquarters. He moreover, served as a colonel general staff for the Directorate General of Forces Intelligence and a colonel administrative of the Ghatail area headquarters.

Jahangir was promoted to major general in 2016 and appointed as the managing director of the Bangladesh Machine Tools Factory. Soon after, Jahangir was designated as the chairman of the Bangladesh Tea Board in 2018. He inaugurated the Sreemangal Upazila tea auction center. In September 2019, he was recalled back to the army and transferred to the Ministry of Foreign Affairs. He was appointed ambassador of Bangladesh to Lebanon in July 2020. He went on leave per retirement in August 2023. Air Vice Marshal Javed Tanveer Khan succeeded him as the ambassador on 7 July 2023.

=== UN Mission ===
Jahangir served with the United Nations peacekeeping force thrice. He was first deployed in the United Nations Iraq–Kuwait Observation Mission in 1991. Jahangir later served as chief supply officer of the United Nations Mission in Sudan and furthermore the deputy chief of integrated support services of the United Nations Mission in Liberia.
