= Javed Tanveer Khan =

Bangladeshi officer and diplomat

Javed Tanveer Khan BSP, OSP

Bangladesh Ambassador to Lebanon
- In office 7 July 2023 – 25 April 2025
- President: Mohammed Shahabuddin
- Prime Minister: Sheikh Hasina; Muhammad Yunus (acting)
- Preceded by: Jahangir Al Mustahidur Rahman
- Succeeded by: Jubayer Salehin

Military service
- Allegiance: Bangladesh
- Branch/service: Bangladesh Air Force
- Years of service: 1990 - present
- Rank: Air Vice-Marshal
- Unit: No. 27 Squadron
- Commands: ACAS (Planning) at Air Headquarters; ACAS (Operations) at Air Headquarters; AOC of BAF Base Matiur Rahman; FSR of BAF Base Zahurul Haque; AOC of BAF Base Paharkanchanpur; Commandant of Bangladesh Air Force Academy

Javed Tanveer Khan (Note: BSP, OSP, ndc, afwc, acsc, psc) is a two star air officer of the Bangladesh Air Force and incumbent assistant chief of air staff for planning at air headquarters. He is the former Bangladeshi ambassador to Lebanon and antecedent air officer commanding at BAF Base Matiur Rahman in Jessore.

== Early life and education ==
Khan received his commission on 23 January 1990. He had his BSc in aeronautics from Rajshahi University. He did two master's degrees in defence and security studies from DSCSC and Bangladesh University of Professionals (BUP) and another master's degree in operational science and arts from Air University (ACSC), US.

== Career ==
Khan served as air officer commanding at BAF Paharkanchanpur in Tangail and then AOC at BAF Matiur Rahman. Earlier, he was the commandant of the Bangladesh Air Force Academy. He replaced Major General Md Jahangir Al Mustahidur Rahman as ambassador to Lebanon in August 2023. President Shahabuddin asked him to strengthen bilateral relations between Bangladesh and Lebanon and explore trade and investment opportunities there.
