= Abul Kalam Azad (officer) =

Bangladesh Army lieutenant colonel

Abul Kalam Azad BPM
- Born: 30 October 1971; Shibganj, Rajshahi, Bangladesh
- Died: 31 March 2017 (aged 45); Combined Military Hospital, Dhaka, Bangladesh
- Military career
- Allegiance: Bangladesh
- Branch: Bangladesh Army
- Service years: 1996–2017
- Rank: Lieutenant Colonel
- Unit: East Bengal Regiment
- Commands: CO of RAB - 12; Director of Intelligence Wing, RAB
- Conflicts: Operation Twilight †
- Awards: Maroon Parachute Wing
- Police career
- Unit: Rapid Action Battalion
- Allegiance: Bangladesh
- Branch: Bangladesh Police
- Service years: 2011–2017
- Rank: Director
- Awards: Bangladesh Police Medal

Abul Kalam Azad (30 October 1971 – 31 March 2017) was a lieutenant colonel of Bangladesh Army. He served as director of intelligence of the Rapid Action Battalion.

== Early life and education ==
Mohammad Abul Kalam Azad, was born on 30 October 1971 in Shibganj of Chapai Nawabganj district. He completed an MA in English from National University.

== Career ==
=== Army ===
Abul Kalam Azad was commissioned in the East Bengal Regiment after passing the 34th BMA long course on June 7, 1996.

During his time in the army he served in different posts including IO, adjutant and quartermaster with the 6th East Bengal Regiment. He also worked in different important posts at the army headquarters, administrative office, 1st Para Commando Battalion and 19th East Bengal Regiment.

=== Rapid Action Battalion ===
He had been deputed to the paramilitary Rapid Action Battalion as commanding officer in RAB-12 from October 26, 2011. He served as a deputy director in the intelligence wing (TFI Cell) of RAB Headquarters from December 31, 2011, to December 7, 2013. He was promoted to the post of director in the intelligence wing in the same year. On 27 January 2016 he was awarded the Bangladesh Police Medal.

On 25 March 2017 he was critically injured in a bomb attack while taking part in Operation Twilight. He was flown to Mount Elizabeth Hospital in Singapore for better treatment the next day. Later he was flown back to Dhaka. On 31 March 2017 he died at Combined Military Hospital (CMH) in Dhaka.
