= Military ranks of Bangladesh =

The Military ranks of Bangladesh are the military insignia used by the Bangladesh Armed Forces.

== Commissioned officer ranks ==
The rank insignia of commissioned officers.

Rank group	General / flag officers				Senior officers			Junior officers
Bangladesh Army
Bangladesh Army	জেনারেল; Jēnārēl	লেফটেন্যান্ট জেনারেল; Lēphṭēnānṭ jēnārēl	মেজর জেনারেল; Mējar jēnārēl	ব্রিগেডিয়ার জেনারেল; Brigēḍiẏār jēnārēl	কর্নেল; Karnēl	লেফটেন্যান্ট কর্নেল; Lēphṭēnānṭ karnēl	মেজর; Mējar	ক্যাপ্টেন; Kaepṭēn	লেফটেন্যান্ট; Lēphṭēnānṭ		সেকেন্ড লেফটেন্যান্ট; Sēkēnḍ lēphṭēnānṭ
Bangladesh Navy
Bangladesh Navy	এ্যাডমিরাল; Aeḍmirāl	ভাইস এ্যাডমিরাল; Bhā'is aeḍamirāl	রিয়ার এ্যাডমিরাল; Riẏār aeḍamirāl	কমোডোর; Kômōḍōr	ক্যাপ্টেন; Kaepṭēn	কমান্ডার; Kômānḍār	লেফটেন্যান্ট কমান্ডার; Lēphṭēnānṭ kômānḍār	লেফটেন্যান্ট; Lēphṭēnānṭ	সাব-লেফটেন্যান্ট; Sāb-lēphṭēnānṭ	এ্যাক্টিং সাব-লেফটেন্যান্ট; Ēyākṭiṁ sāb-lēphṭēn'yānṭ	মিডশিপম্যান; Miḍśipmaen
Bangladesh Air Force
Bangladesh Air Force	এয়ার চিফ মার্শাল; Ēẏār chiph mārśāl	এয়ার মার্শাল; Ēẏār mārśāl	এয়ার ভাইস মার্শাল; Ēẏār bhā'is mārśāl	এয়ার কমোডোর; Ēẏār kômōḍōr	গ্রুপ ক্যাপ্টেন; Grup kaepṭēn	উইং কমান্ডার; U'iṁ kômānḍār	স্কোয়াড্রন লীডার; Skōẏāḍran līḍār	ফ্লাইট লেফটেন্যান্ট; Phlā'iṭ lēphṭēnānṭ	ফ্লাইং অফিসার; Phlā'iṁ ôphisār		পাইলট অফিসার; Pā'ilôṭ Ôphisār
Rank group	General / flag officers				Senior officers			Junior officers

== Other ranks ==
The rank insignia of junior commissioned officers, non-commissioned officers, and enlisted personnel.

Rank group	Junior commissioned officers			Non-commissioned officer	Enlisted
Bangladesh Army
Bangladesh Army	মাস্টার ওয়ারেন্ট অফিসার; Māsṭār ōẏārēnṭ ôphisār	সিনিয়র ওয়ারেন্ট অফিসার; Siniẏar ōẏārēnṭ ôphisār	ওয়ারেন্ট অফিসার; Ōẏārēnṭ ôphisār	সার্জেন্ট; Sārjēnṭ	কর্পোর‍্যাল kôrpōrāl	ল্যান্স কর্পোর‍্যাল; Lāns kôrpōrāl		সৈনিক; Śoinik
Bangladesh Navy						No insignia		No insignia
Bangladesh Navy	মাস্টার চীফ পেটি অফিসার; Māsṭār chīph pēṭi ôphisār	সিনিয়র চীফ পেটি অফিসার; Siniẏar chīph pēṭi ôphisār	চীফ পেটি অফিসার; Chīph pēṭi ôphisār	পেটি অফিসার; Pēṭi ôphisār	লিডিং সীম্যান; Liḍiṁ sīmaen	এ্যাবল সীম্যান; Ēyābal sīmaen		অর্ডিনারী সিম্যান; Ôrḍinārī simaen
Bangladesh Air Force									No insignia
Bangladesh Air Force	মাস্টার ওয়ারেন্ট অফিসার; Māsṭār ōẏārēnṭ ôphisār	সিনিয়র ওয়ারেন্ট অফিসার; Siniẏar ōẏārēnṭ ôphisār	ওয়ারেন্ট অফিসার; Ōẏārēnṭ ôphisār	সার্জেন্ট; Sārjēnṭ	কর্পোর‍্যাল; Kôrpōral		লীডিং এয়ারক্র্যাফটম্যান; Līḍing ēẏārkrāphṭmaen	এয়ারক্র্যাফটম্যান-১; Ēẏārkrāphṭmaen-1	এয়ারক্র্যাফটম্যান-২; Ēẏārkrāphṭmaen-2
Rank group	Junior commissioned officers			Non-commissioned officer	Enlisted

=== Other appointments ===
Sergeants holds key appointments in companies, batteries (company equivalent of artillery), infantry battalions and artillery regiments, e.g. Company Quartermaster Sergeant (CQMS), Regimental Sergeant Major (RSM), persons holding these appointments have separate rank insignias though, these are not actually ranks.

	Other rank insignia
Army
	সার্জেন্ট মেজর; Sārjēnṭ mējôr	কোয়ার্টার মাস্টার সার্জেন্ট; Kōẏārṭār māsṭār sārjēnṭ	প্রধান সার্জেন্ট; Prôdhān sārjēnṭ	মাস্টার সার্জেন্ট; Māsṭār sārjēnṭ
Air force
				ফ্লাইট সার্জেন্ট; Phlā'iṭ sārjēnṭ
