= S. M. Salahuddin Islam =

Major General of Bangladesh Army

- এস এম সালাহ উদ্দিন ইসলাম
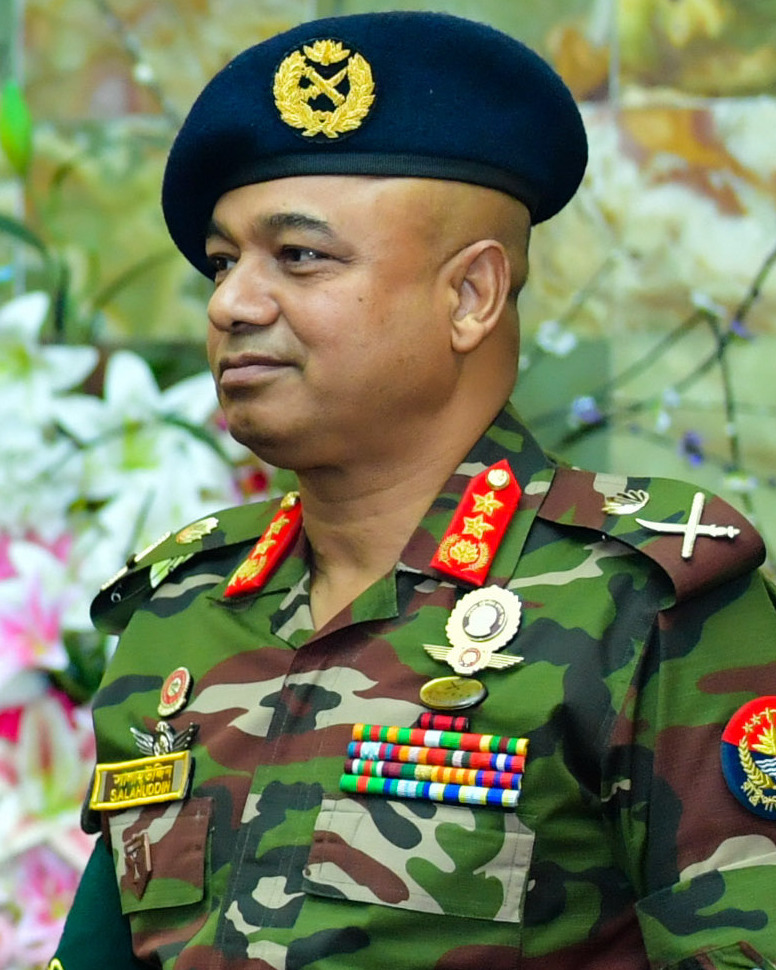
- Islam in Bangabhaban in 2023
- Military career
- Allegiance: Bangladesh
- Branch: Bangladesh Army
- Service years: 1987–2024
- Rank: Major General
- Unit: East Bengal Regiment
- Commands: Military Secretary to President; GOC of 17th Infantry Division; Executive Chairman of Bangladesh Export Processing Zone Authority; Commander of 105th Infantry Brigade; Commander of President Guard Regiment; Commander of 88th Infantry Brigade
- Conflicts: MONUSCO; Chittagong Hill Tracts Conflict
- Awards: Bir Protik; Independence Day Award

S. M. Salahuddin Islam is a retired major general of the Bangladesh Army who served as the military secretary to the president of Bangladesh. Prior to that, he was executive chairman of the Bangladesh Export Processing Zone Authority.

== Career ==
Islam was commissioned in the infantry corps in 1987 from the 17th BMA long course. He served in the 21st Battalion of the East Bengal Regiment in the Chittagong hill tracts. He also led a platoon in the Bangladesh Military Academy. He had also commanded units of the Rapid Action Battalion, President Guard Regiment, and Special Security Force. He was deployed in the United Nations peacekeeping operations in Congo (DRC). He received the Bir Protik award for his operations in the Chittagong hill tracts.

On 10 March 2019, he was appointed chairman of the Bangladesh Export Processing Zone Authority. He is a director of Hotels International Limited, the holding company of Pan Pacific Sonargaon.
