= S. M. Shamim Uz Zaman =

Bangladesh Army major general (born 1965)

Shamim-Uz-Zaman
- Born: 2 January 1965 (age 61); Khulna, East Pakistan, Pakistan
- Military career
- Allegiance: Bangladesh
- Branch: Bangladesh Army
- Service years: 1984–2022
- Rank: Major General
- Unit: Bangladesh Infantry Regiment
- Commands: Military Secretary to the President; Director General of Directorate General of Defence Purchase; GOC of 17th Infantry Division; Commander of 305th Infantry Brigade
- Awards: Senabahini Padak (SBP); Bishishto Seba Padak (BSP)

SM Shamim Uz Zaman SBP, BSP, ndc, psc is a retired Bangladesh Army major general. He served as the Bangladeshi ambassador to Libya. Prior to joining here, he served as military secretary to the president of Bangladesh.

== Early life ==
Zaman was born on 2 January 1965, in Khulna, Bangladesh. After completing his HSC, he joined the army in 1983. He was commissioned from Bangladesh Military Academy with 11 BMA Long Course in the Corps of Infantry on 21 December 1984. He completed his bachelor's degree at Chittagong University, a master's in defence studies from National University, Bangladesh, and a master's in military science from Madras University, India. He attended Advanced Security Cooperation Course in Hawaii, US, Green Arrow Missile Course in Pakistan, and Army Staff Course in Wellington, India.

== Career ==
Zaman was also a platoon commander in the Bangladesh Military Academy. He was director general of the Directorate General of Defence Purchase. He served as general officer commanding (GOC) and Sylhet area commander until he joined as military secretary to President Md Abdul Hamid in 2019. He has commanded the Bangladesh Military Command in Kuwait for more than four years.
