= Colonel (Bangladesh) =

Rank in Bangladesh Army

Colonel কর্নেল
- The insignia for the rank Colonel is the Nymphaeaceae the Emblem of Bangladesh, above two pips.
- Country: Bangladesh
- Service branch: Bangladesh Army
- Abbreviation: Col
- Rank group: Senior officer
- NATO rank code: OF-5
- Non-NATO rank: OF-4
- Formation: 6 April 1972
- Next higher rank: Brigadier General
- Next lower rank: Lieutenant Colonel
- Equivalent ranks: Captain (BN); Group Captain (BAF)

Colonel (Bengali : কর্নেল) is a senior rank in Bangladesh Army. It is the senior most designation of senior officers in Bangladesh Army.

== Details ==
Colonel is a rank which is higher than Lieutenant Colonel but lower than Brigadier General. It is equivalent to Captain of Bangladesh Navy and Group Captain of Bangladesh Air Force.

== Appointment ==
A Colonel is routinely appointed as an administrator of an area headquarter. As operational officer, colonels designate as garrison staff of a division and furthermore the Directorate General of Forces Intelligence. As training commanders, colonels are usually posted as a department administrative such as commander of 403rd Battle group under commend of ARTDOC. Colonels also have their role under Home ministry as additional director generals of Rapid Action Battalion. They also serve as Sector Commander and Deputy Region Commander of Border Guard Bangladesh.

== See also ==
- Military ranks of Bangladesh
