= NM Nazmul Ahsan =

NM Nazmul Ahsan was a Bengali student who died fighting in the Bangladesh Liberation War. He is considered a martyr (Shaheed) in Bangladesh. He was awarded the Independence Award, the highest civilian award in Bangladesh, posthumously for his contribution to the war.

Ahsan was born on 20 January 1949 in Kakarkandi Union, Nalitabari Upazila, Mymensingh District, East Bengal, Pakistan.

Ahsan completed his SSC examination in 1965. He was admitted to the Faculty of Agricultural Engineering and Technology in the East Pakistan Agricultural University. While studying at the university, Bangladesh Liberation broke out in 1971. He trained in India and joined the war in Sector 11. He commanded the 139 strong 'Nazmul Company'.

Ahsan died on 6 July 1971 after his residence was attacked by Pakistan Army who had been tipped off by a member of the Razzakar paramilitary unit.

Ahsan's son is Engineer Shahidul Islam Haque.
