= Brigadier general (Bangladesh) =

Rank in Bangladesh Army

Brigadier General ব্রিগেডিয়ার জেনারেল
- The insignia for the rank of brigadier general is the Nymphaeaceae the Emblem of Bangladesh, above three pips.

- Vehicle Star plate of Brigadier general
- Country: Bangladesh
- Service branch: Bangladesh Army
- Abbreviation: Brig Gen
- Rank group: Flag officer
- Rank: One-star
- NATO rank code: OF-6
- Non-NATO rank: O-7
- Formation: 6 April 1972
- Next higher rank: Major General
- Next lower rank: Colonel
- Equivalent ranks: Commodore (BN); Air Commodore (BAF)

Brigadier General (Bengali: ব্রিগেডিয়ার জেনারেল, romanized: Brigēḍiẏār jēnārēl) is a senior rank in the Bangladesh Army. It is the fourth-highest active rank of the Bangladesh Army and was created as a direct equivalent of the British military rank of Brigadier. It is the truncated general rank and flag officer of the army.

== Details ==
Brigadier general is a higher rank than Colonel, but lower than Major General. The order is the equivalent of Commodore in the Bangladesh Navy and Air Commodore in the Bangladesh Air Force.

== History ==
Prior to 2001, the Bangladesh Army rank was known as brigadier, in conformity with the rank structure of the Commonwealth Nations. In 2001, the Bangladesh Army rechristened the rank to brigadier general.

== Appointment ==
Brigadier generals are second most senior operational officers of the army, next to major generals. They are generally posted as a station commander of an area headquarters. In a division, brigadiers are assigned as commander of an infantry, artillery, armoured, engineer or special force brigade. Brigadiers are chief training generals of ARTDOC commending all but infantry officers of regimental centres and schools. Under Ministry of home affairs, brigadiers serve as additional director general & region commander of Border Guard Bangladesh. Under the Ministry of foreign affairs brigadiers usually designate as military attache for a particular high commission or embassy. In Army Headquarters, brigadier generals may uphold as director of certain directorates of the army. They also command the President Guard Regiment.

== See also ==
- Military ranks of Bangladesh
