= Rahmatullah Al Mahmud Selim =

Bangladeshi musician

- Born: 1 July 1954 (age 71); Dhaka, East Pakistan
- Occupation: musician
- Awards: Ekushey Padak (2017)

Rahmatullah Al Mahmud Selim (born 1 July 1954) is a Bangladeshi musician, songwriter, composer and civil rights activist. He was awarded Ekushey Padak by the government of Bangladesh in 2017 for his contribution in music. He is involved with Bangladesh Udichi Shilpigoshthi where he served as the general secretary.

Selim was born on 1 July 1954 in Nawabganj, Dhaka of the then East Pakistan (now Bangladesh). His father's name was Mohammad Jalal Uddin Molla and his mother's name was Begum Fatima Khatun.
