= Julhas Uddin Ahmed =

Bangladeshi Nazrul Geeti singer and teacher (1933–2021)

- জুলহাস উদ্দিন আহমেদ
- Born: 10 November 1933; Sreenagar Upazila, Munshiganj, Bengal Presidency, British India
- Died: 24 September 2021 (aged 87); Sreenagar Upazila, Munshiganj, Bangladesh
- Occupation: Singer
- Awards: Ekushey Padak (2017)

Ustad Julhas Uddin Ahmed (10 November 1933 – 24 September 2021) was a Bangladeshi Nazrul Geeti singer and teacher. He was awarded Ekushey Padak for his special contribution in Nazrul Geeti by the government of Bangladesh in 2017.

== Early life ==
Ahmed was born on 10 November 1933 at Baraikhali village in Sreenagar Upazila, Munshiganj District of the then British India (now Bangladesh) to Yehair Ali Bepari and Hasna Begum. He was the youngest among 9 children of the couple. He lost his eyesight at the age of two, suffering from smallpox.

== Career ==
In 1949, Ahmed was sent to Kolkata by his elder brother Farhad Hossain for studying in music. There he was first trained by Chinmoy Lahiri and then by Tarapada Chakraborty for five years in classical music. He returned to East Pakistan in 1955. A year later in 1956, again he went to Kolkata and started practicing classical music with Ustad Amir Khan, Omkarnath Thakur, Nissar Hussain Khan and Ghulam Ali.

From 1961 to 1975, he was a regular Nazrul Geeti performer at Radio of East Pakistan (now Bangladesh Betar). After the independence of Bangladesh, he joined as the head of the Nazrul Geeti program in Bangladesh Television and retired in 1975.

== Personal life and death ==
Ahmed never married. He died on 24 September 2021 from Dengue fever.

== Awards and recognition ==
- Nazrul Gold Medal
- Nasiruddin Gold Medal
- Honored by Shilpakala Academy
- Honored by Bulbul Lalitakala Academy
- Honored by the Rabindra Sangeet Shilpi Sangstha
- AB Bank-Channel i Lifetime Achievement Award (2016)
- Ekushey Padak (2017)
