= Abul Momen =

Bangladeshi journalist (born 1948)

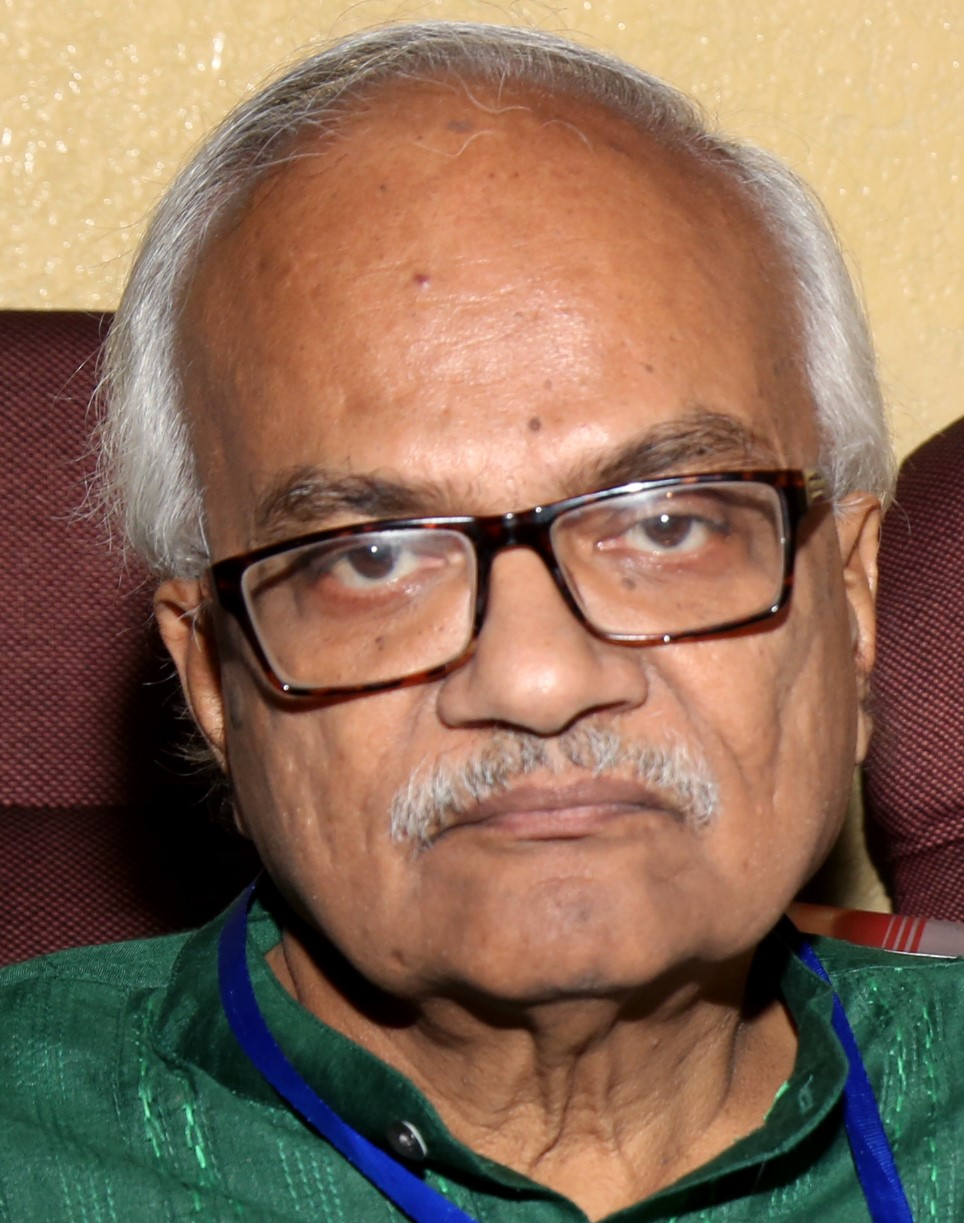
- Born: December 18, 1948 (age 77); Chittagong District, East Bengal, Dominion of Pakistan
- Education: University of Dhaka
- Occupation: Journalist
- Spouse: Shila Momen
- Father: Abul Fazal
- Awards: Ekushey Padak; Bangla Academy Literary Award

Abul Momen (born December 18, 1948) is a Bangladeshi journalist. He had been a resident editor of Prothom Alo since 1998. He is currently the advisory editor of Dainik Suprabhat. He was awarded Ekushey Padak in 2017 by the government of Bangladesh.

== Background and career ==
Momen was born on December 18, 1948, in Chittagong district. He was the son of littérateur Abul Fazal. He completed his master's at the University of Dhaka. He worked at Chittagong Art College, The Daily Star, and Bhorer Kagoj. He was a professor at the University of Chittagong. He won the Bangla Academy Literary Award in 2016 in the non-fiction category.

== Personal life ==
Momen is married to Shila Momen. Together they have one daughter and one son.
