= Para Commando Brigade (Bangladesh) =

Bangladesh Army Special Forces

- Bangladesh Army Special Force's Insignia
- Active: 2016–Present
- Country: Bangladesh
- Branch: Bangladesh Army
- Type: Special Forces
- Role: Special Operations
- Size: 2 Battalions
- Garrison/HQ: Jalalabad Cantonment, Sylhet
- Nickname: The Cheetahs
- Motto: "করো অথবা মরো" ("Do or Die")
- Colors: Maroon
- Mascot: Cheetah
- Engagements: Chittagong Hill Tracts counter-insurgency; United Nations Peacekeeping; Operation Thunderbolt; Operation Twilight in Sylhet; Operation BEKPA 2; Operation Mayurpankhi

Commanders
- Notable commanders: Lt Col. Abu Taher; Lt Col. Matiur Rahman; Brig Gen. Muhsin Alam

Insignia
- Regimental Flag

- Insignia

- Maroon Badge

- Combat Service Identification Badge

- Regimental Beret

The Para Commando Brigade (Bengali: প্যারা কমান্ডো ব্রিগেড) is a special operations force of the Bangladesh Army. This special forces brigade is headquartered at Jalalabad Cantonment, Sylhet. It is composed of two para commando battalions.

The involvement of special operations units in Bangladesh Armed Forces was initiated by the Bangladesh Liberation War in 1971. From 1974, commando units existed in Bangladesh Army under various names, mostly in the form of specialist of jungle warfare and counterinsurgency units. A separate special operations capable unit of the Bangladesh Army was first officially formed on 30 June 1992 as the 1st Para Commando Battalion, which is the first modern special force of the Bangladesh Armed Forces. On 1 June 2015, the unit received National Standard from the President of Bangladesh. On 4 September 2016, Ad hoc Para Commando Brigade was formed and the brigade got its full structure and strength by 10 October 2019. The official flag of the brigade was first raised by the prime minister of Bangladesh on 28 October 2020.

== History ==
=== Bangladesh Liberation War period ===
Crack Platoon

Crack Platoon was a specialized urban warfare unit of Muktibahini during the liberation war of Bangladesh. In June 1971, sector 2 commander Khaled Mosharraf sent these specialized urban guerrillas to Dhaka city. Their most famous operation was Operation Hotel Intercontinental. These guerrillas successfully launched a raid in hotel intercontinental where a delegate from the World Bank and the Pakistani authorities were concentrating in a meeting. In this operation ten to fifteen soldiers of Pakistan Army were killed and many were wounded.

The platoon's notable operations included: Operation Hotel Intercontinental, Operation Five power stations, Operation Farm Gate, Operation Dhanmondi, Operation Green Road etc. The crack platoon launched 82 guerrilla operations in Dhaka during the war.

Special Warfare Wing

In 1976, special warfare wing was established at School of Infantry and Tactics in Jalalabad Cantonment, Sylhet. This was the first step towards the formation of a special force in Independent Bangladesh. In 1980, Army commando course and counter-insurgency course started at special warfare wing. In the same year, the Special Warfare Wing was expanded to Special Warfare School. The Army Airborne School was established in 1988 at Sylhet Cantonment under special warfare wing. In 1989, the para training course started for the first time in the special warfare school.

=== 1st Para Commando Battalion ===
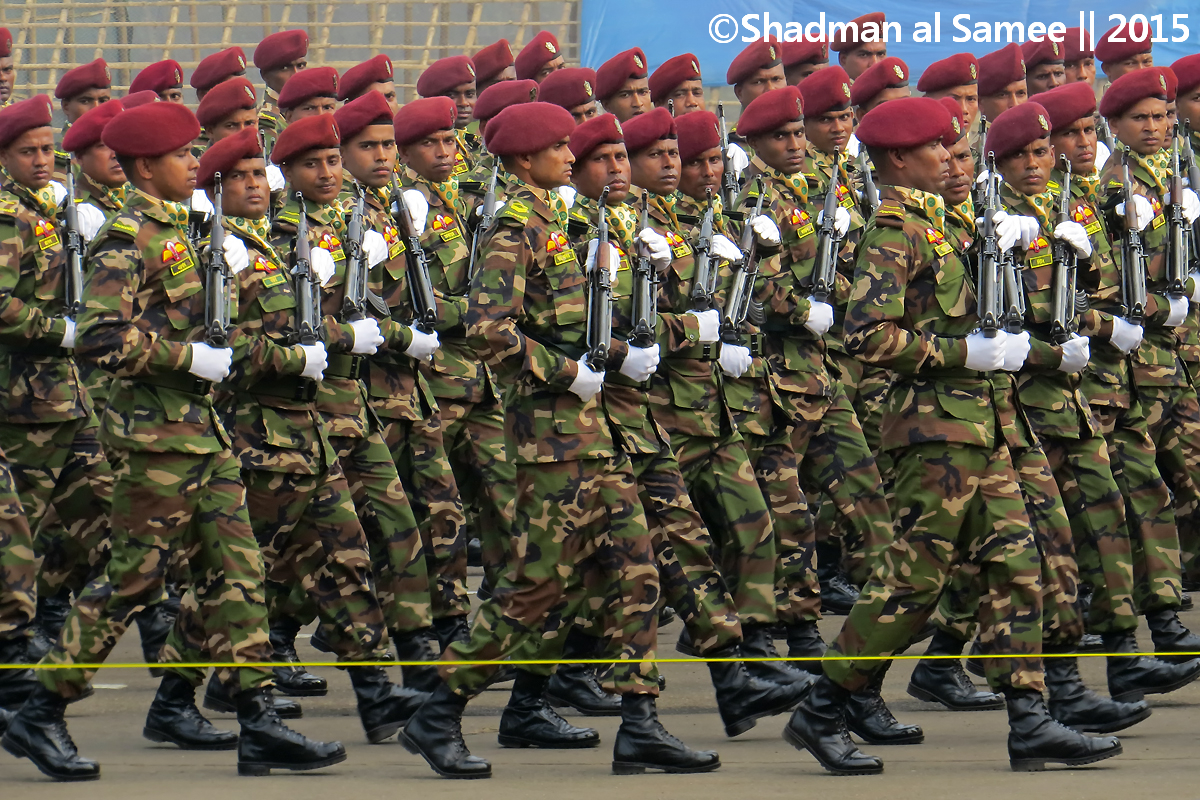
Bangladesh Army Para Commando troop at Victory Day Parade 2015

On 30 June 1992, the 1st Para Commando Battalion started its journey at Jalalabad Cantonment of Sylhet. The flag of the battalion was raised in May 1993. On 1 June 2015, 1st Para Commando Battalion came out as a full-fledged regiment. After the formation of Ad hoc Para Commando Brigade on 4 September 2016, they started working under the command of the Brigade.

The battalion was awarded the national standard on 2 November 2017 as a recognition of their outstanding works.

=== 2nd Para Commando Battalion ===
The 2nd Para Commando Battalion was raised on ad hoc basis along with the headquarters of Para Commando Brigade in 2016. It was finally raised as 2nd Para Commando Battalion in 2019.The official flag raising ceremony of the battalion was held on 5 November 2020 at Sylhet Cantonment.

== Operations ==
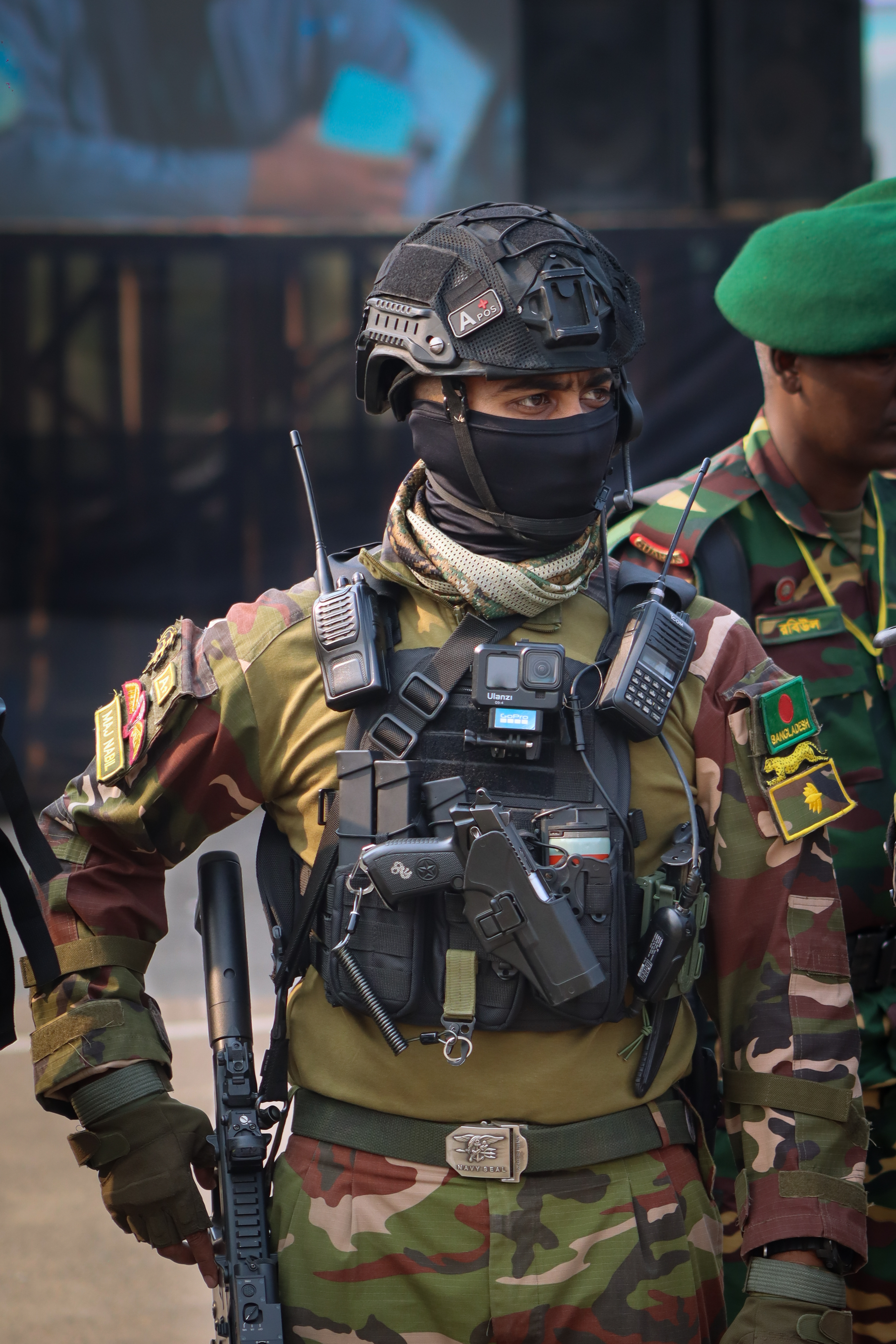
An officer ranked Major of Para Commando Brigade at the funeral of Osman Hadi 2025

=== United Nations peacekeeping ===
Bangladesh is participating in different UN peacekeeping missions since 1988. Currently, Bangladesh is one of the largest contributors of the UN peacekeeping operations. Bangladesh Army has deployed its Special Forces in various UN Peacekeeping and Peace Enforcement missions, notably in Ivory Coast, South Sudan, Darfur, Central African Republic, Haiti and Mali. These Special Forces detachments, using BANSF prefix, are often tasked with high risk rescue operations and raids against insurgents.

=== Dhaka Holey Artisan Bakery hostage crisis ===
On 1 July 2016, five assailants stormed the Holey Artisan Bakery with crude bombs, machetes, AK 22 rifle and pistols, in Dhaka's affluent neighborhood, Gulshan 2, which is extremely popular among expatriates and foreigners, at roughly 9:20 pm, taking hostage of the locals and foreigners inside. Not realizing the gravity of the situation, the initial assault to secure the premises, commenced by Dhaka Metropolitan Police, resulted in the casualties of two police officers in exchanging gunfire with the assailants.

However, Police and the Rapid Action Battalion acted with celerity in setting up a perimeter around the Bakery to block escape of any assailant. After fruitless hours of seeking to bring a peaceful solution to the problem, when the perpetrators refused to communicate with authorities, the realization set that alternative measures were required.

At an early morning meeting on Saturday (2 July), the highest level of Government decided to engage the 1st Commando Battalion. They were flown in from Sylhet to carry out a counter-assault and free the hostages.The operation was led by 1st Para-Commando Battalion under the leadership of Operational Commander Brigadier General Mujibur Rahman of the Bangladesh Army's 46th Independent Infantry Brigade. After gathering intelligence from RAB and the Police forces present on the ground, Commandos initiated their raid (codenamed "Operation Thunderbolt"), which began at 7:40 am and concluded at 8:30 am. They were successfully able to free 13 hostages and kill all 5 assailants.

During the attack, 9 Italians, 7 Japanese, 2 Bangladeshis, 1 Indian, and 1 American were killed by the perpetrators.

=== Operation Twilight in Sylhet ===
On Thursday, 23 March 2017, the Bangladesh Police surrounded a suspected militant hideout in Dakshin Surma Upazila, Sylhet, Bangladesh. Later, a SWAT team joined the police unit from Dhaka. The housing complex had two apartment buildings. The Police unit was reinforced with personnel from Rapid Action Battalion on Friday. On Saturday, the 1st Para Commando Battalion took charge of operations and named it Operation Twilight.

Operation Twilight was launched by the 1st Para Commando Battalion of the ad hoc para commando brigade of the Bangladesh Army under the command of GOC of 17th Infantry Division in Jalalabad Cantonment Major General Anwarul Momen. The main gate of the building was blocked by the militants with a refrigerator with an IED attached to it. The building had 30 apartments and 150 rooms, the militants were constantly changing their location. The operation was launched on Saturday morning around 8 am. The Commando unit was being assisted by SWAT and Bangladesh Police. Security forces established a three kilometer perimeter around the militant hideout. The commandos rescued 78 civilians trapped in the building from Thursday. Two militants were killed in the initial attack, one of whom detonated a suicide vest. The militants had planted IEDs all over the building which slowed down the military operation. Army spokesman, Brigadier General Fakhrul Ahsan, reported that the operation would take more time because of the presence of IEDs in "strategic points" in the building. The Bangladesh Army used RPGs and shells to drive the militants out without much success. The commandos also used Armored Personnel Carriers in the operation. Finally four militants were found dead at the hideout.

=== Operation BEKPA 2 ===
Letter of Commendation by Force Commander MINUSCA to BANSFC/3

Bangladesh Special Forces (BANSF/3) in the United Nations Peacekeeping Mission launched an operation against rebels in the Central African Republic. Major Md Shahidul Islam of BANSF-3 led the operation to free an area from the rebel group Unité pour la paix en Centrafrique (UPC). At the same time, more than 100 prisoners were rescued by the operation.

=== Operation POUPOU ===
Bangladesh Special Forces (BANSFC/3) operating in MINUSCA has successfully launched an operation against FDPC armed group in the Central African Republic. Due to various reasons FDPC stopped movement of all kind of vehicles and denied freedom of movement through the Highway 1 of Central African Republic at Zoukumbo village. There were 200-300 houses in the village. The village was used by the FDPC members and their number were around 100. After a number of negotiations by MINUSCA elements, military operations was seen as the viable means to put an end to this crisis situation. On 3 April 2019, BANSFC/3 along with BANBAT/5 were tasked to evict armed group members from the Zoukumbo village and recover 11x Pickups (Government Owned) which were held by FDPC armed group.

Accordingly, on 5 April 2019, BANBAT/5 created blocking positions on both sides of the village and dislodged outpost reaching towards the village and soften up the area by providing fire support from APC. BANSFC/3 took over from BANBAT/5 at the starting of the village and cleared the whole area by moving from house to house with their integral fire support from their APC. After clearing the whole village by BANSFC/3 members, recovered pickups were taken back to Bouar and was handed over later by BANBAT/5. BANSFC/3 rescued and handed over the civilians (70 civilians) who were trapped inside the village during the firefight, to a FACA (Forces Armées Centrafricaines) platoon after the operations. BANSFC/3 also handed over the ground to FACA platoon. There were 5 confirmed kill and 40 injured from the armed group. There was no casualty from Peacekeeping force except some equipment damage. The operation was led by the Lt Col S M Azad, SUP, who was Contingent Commander of BANSFC/3 at that time.

=== Operation Mayurpankhi ===
On 24 February 2019, a Boeing 737-800 aircraft of Biman Bangladesh Airlines aircraft was hijacked by a gunman inflight while en route to Dubai from Dhaka. The aircraft made an emergency landing at Shah Amanat International Airport, Chottogram. A lone gunman named Palash tried to hijack the aircraft. Though his intention was not clear, authorities were trying to negotiate with him. But when negotiations failed, the Para Commando Brigade were green lit to launch an assault. The commandos took only eight minutes to make a conclusion. As a result, the hijacker was shot dead by the commandos, 148 passengers and crew got free from the hostage situation.

== Lineage ==

- 1st Para Commando Battalion was formed in 1992.
- It was upgraded to a regiment in 2015.
- Upgraded to a brigade level force in 2016 and named as the Para Commando Brigade.

== Commanders of the brigade ==
Sequence	Name	From	To
1st	Brigadier General Moin Uddin Mahmud Chowdhury	2016	2019
2nd	Brigadier General Muhammad Muhsin Alam	2019	2021
3rd	Brigadier General Saiful Alam Bhuiyan	2021	2023
4th	Brigadier General Tanvir Islam Khan Chowdhury	2024	2025
5th	Brigadier General M.M. Imrul Hasan	2025	Present

Note: The above list is the list of the commanders of this brigade. The list of the Commanding Officers of 1st Para Commando Battalion is not included into this list.

== EX members of this brigade who are currently serving generals ==
1. Lieutenant General Mohammad Asadullah Minhazul Alam
2. Major General Mohammed Hossain Al Morshed

Lieutenant General S. M. Matiur Rahman who was the first person from Para Commando who became Lieutenant General.

== See also ==
- Bangladesh Special Operations Forces
- School of Infantry and Tactics
- Bangladesh Army Airborne School
- List of formations of the Bangladesh Army
