= School of Infantry and Tactics =

Training Institution operated by the Bangladesh Army

- Insignia of School of Infantry and Tactics
- Abbreviation: SI&T
- Formation: 19 March 1973
- Headquarters: Jalalabad Cantonment, Sylhet, Bangladesh
- Region served: Bangladesh
- Official language: Bengali
- Commandant: Major General Mahmudul Kabir
- Notable Commanders: Major General Iqbal Karim; Major General Mahfuzur Rahman
- Parent organization: ARTDOC
- Website: https://sint.army.mil.bd

School of Infantry and Tactics is a Bangladesh army infantry and special forces training institute. The institute was founded in 1973 and is based in Jalalabad Cantonment, Sylhet.

== History ==
The institute was formed on 19 March 1973 at Comilla Cantonment. It was originally called School of Infantry. In 1974, the tactical wing was added and it was moved to Jessore Cantonment and renamed School of Infantry and Tactics. In the same year it was renamed COMBAS and divided into separate schools for armour, artillery, engineers, and infantry. In August 1977, The institute was renamed back to School of Infantry and Tactics, as it became focused again on infantry training and other branches of the army developed their own training institutes. The institute was shifted in Jalalabad Cantonment, Sylhet Division, in 1979, Special Warfare School was merged with the institution as its special warfare wing in 1982.

== Bangladesh Army Airborne School ==
Airborne tab

The Bangladesh Army Airborne School, widely known as Para Training School, conducts the basic paratrooper (military parachutist) training for the Bangladesh Armed Forces. It is operated by the Special Warfare Wing of School of Infantry and Tactics. The Airborne School conducts the Basic Para Course and Advance Para Course, Free Fall Course, Rigger Course, Pathfinder Course, Jump Master Course; which are open to troops from all branches of the Bangladesh Armed forces.

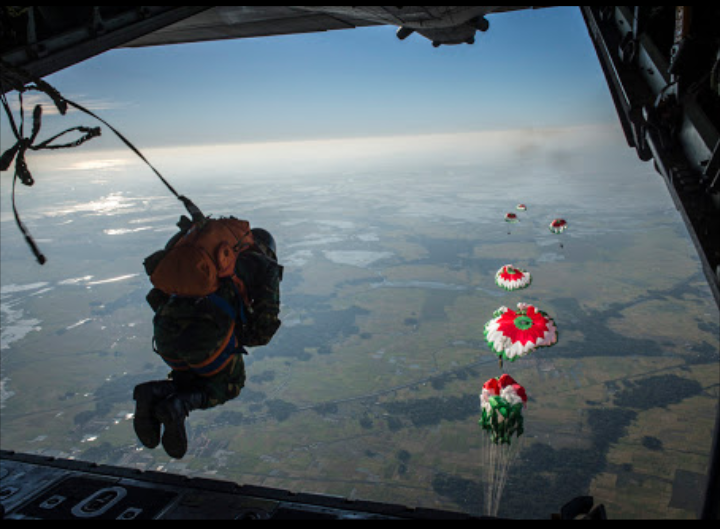
Bangladeshi paratroopers descend from a U.S. Air Force C-130 Hercules, during exercise Cope South over Bangladesh, Nov. 12, 2013.

In 1976, special warfare wing was established at Chittagong Cantonment. Later, it was shifted to the Jalalabad Cantonment. From then this wing started working under the Bangladesh Army School of Infantry and Tactics. This was the first step towards the formation of a special force in Bangladesh. In 1980, the army commando course and the counter-insurgency course was started in special warfare wing. In the same year, the special warfare wing was expanded to special warfare school. The Army Airborne School was established in 1988 at Sylhet Cantonment under Special Warfare Wing. In 1988, the para training course was started for the first time at the special warfare school. A group of Commandos were sent to Pakistan and Indonesia for Advanced Commando and Airborne Training. Successfully completing their training there, they came back home and started Para & Advanced Commando Course in Bangladesh. It is Major (retired) Ahsan Ilahee who was the first instructor and Pioneer of Parachuting in Bangladesh.

== See also ==
- Special Warfare Wing
- Para Commando Brigade (Bangladesh)
- Bangladesh Military Academy
- Bangladesh University of Professionals
