= Anwarul Momen =

Bangladeshi retired Army officer

- আনওয়ারুল মোমেন
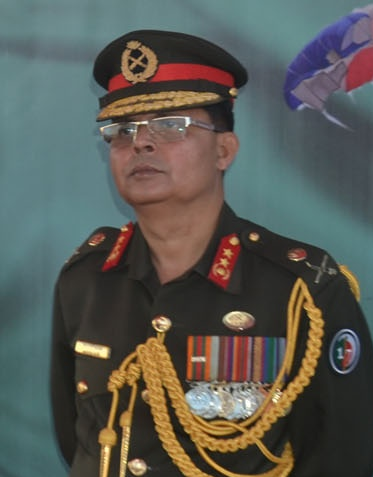
- Momen in 2016
- Born: 2 November 1965 (age 60); Mymensingh, East Pakistan, Pakistan
- Military career
- Allegiance: Bangladesh
- Branch: Bangladesh Army
- Service years: 1985–2021
- Rank: Major General
- Unit: Bangladesh Infantry Regiment
- Commands: Senior Directing Staff (Army-1) of NDC; Commandant of Bangladesh Military Academy; Military Secretary at Army Headquarters; GOC of 17th Infantry Division; Commander of 98th Composite Brigade; Station Commander, Bogura
- Conflicts: Operation Twilight
- Awards: Senabahini Padak (SBP); Oshamanno Sheba Padak (OSP)

Anwarul Momen SBP, OSP, rcds, psc (Bengali: আনওয়ারুল মোমেন; born 2 November 1965) is a retired two star rank major general of the Bangladesh Army. His last appointment was senior directing staff (army-1) at National Defence College.

== Career ==
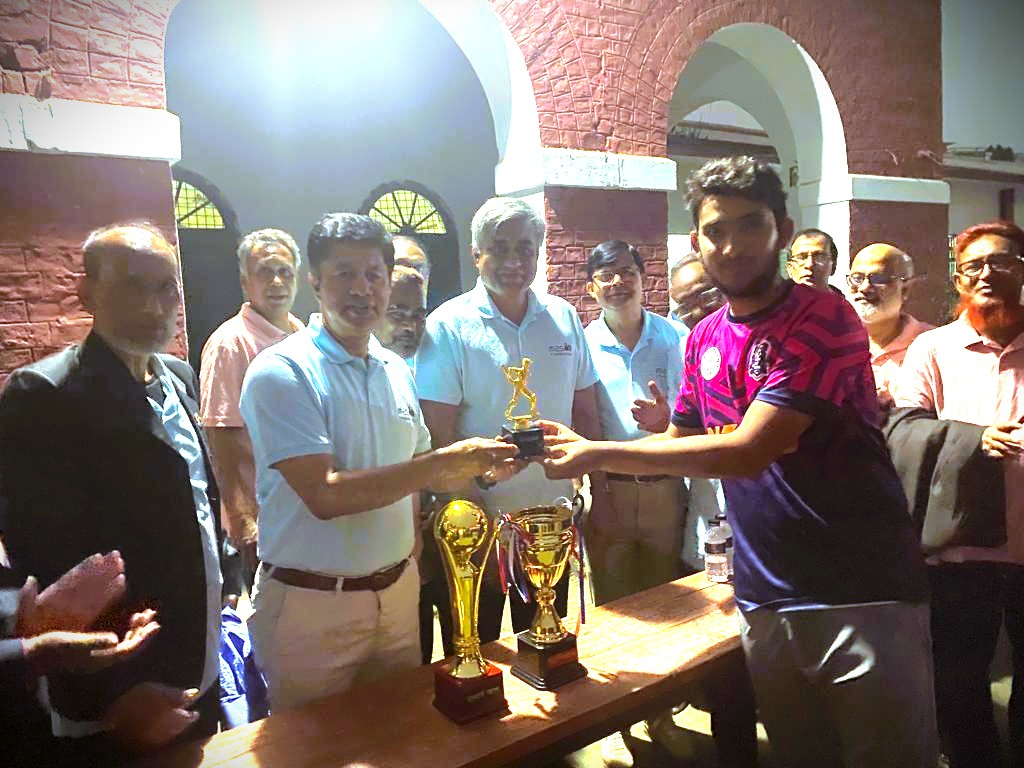
Momen (centre right) with Ehsan Khan at Mymensingh Zilla School, 2023

Momen was commissioned with the 12th BMA long course from the Bangladesh Military Academy in 1985. Momen previously commanded a composite brigade. He was the military secretary to Army Headquarters. He was the GOC of the 17th Infantry Division and area commander of Sylhet Area. He commanded a raid on a militant den in Sylhet on 25 March 2017 named Operation Twilight. He was commandant of the Bangladesh Military Academy.
