= Bangladesh–Lebanon relations =

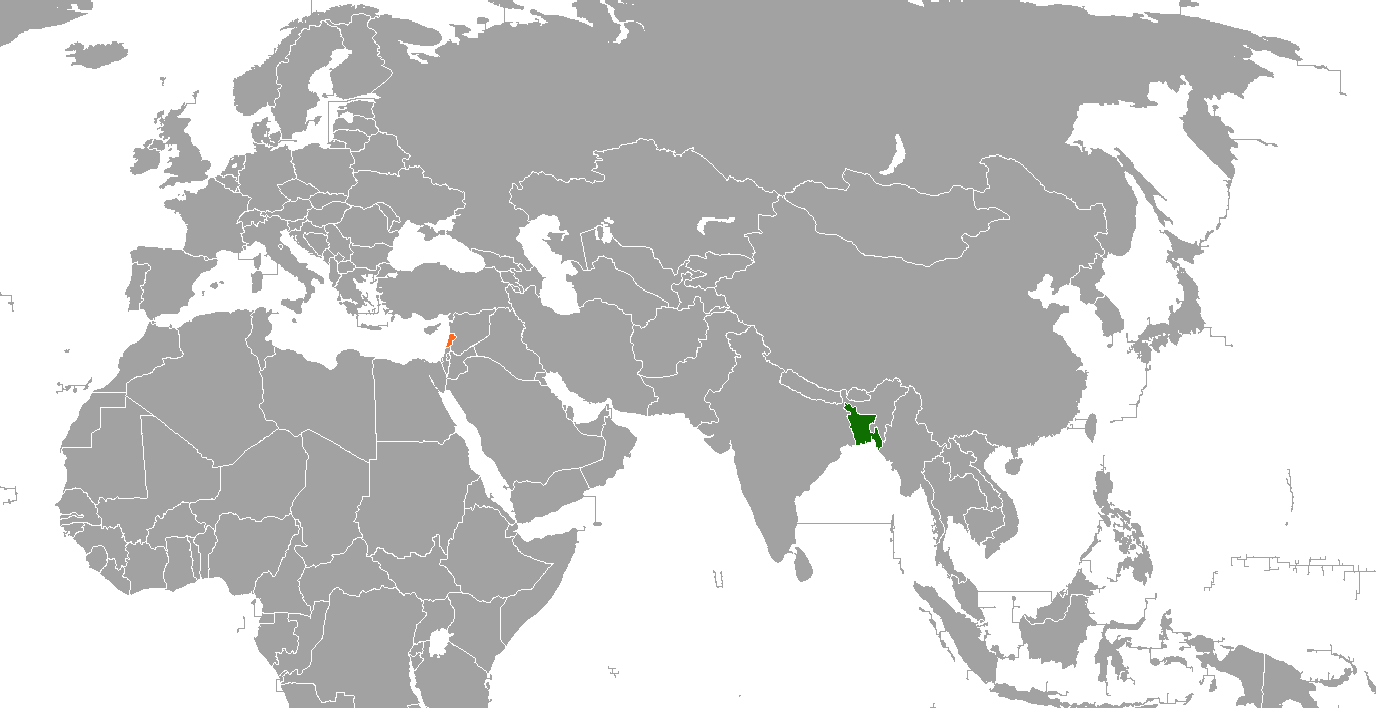

- Bangladesh: Lebanon

Bangladesh–Lebanon relations refers to the bilateral relations between Bangladesh and Lebanon. Bangladesh has an embassy in Beirut. Lebanon has a non-resident embassy in Islamabad, Pakistan.

== 2006 Lebanon War ==
Bangladesh termed Israel's bombardment of Lebanon in 2006 as state terrorism and fully supported Lebanon's cause in the event. The Lebanese government welcomed Bangladesh's pledge of sending troops to UNIFIL. Bangladesh also offered a variety of assistance for the postwar rehabilitation and reconstruction of Lebanon. In 2010, Bangladesh became the first South Asian country to send warships to UNIFIL when BNS Osman and BNS Madhumoti left Chittagong for Lebanon.

Bangladesh Navy has currently deployed one Type 056 class corvette BNS Sangram led by Captain Faisal Mohammad Arifur Rahman Bhuiyan from September 2020.Previously, frigate BNS Osman and large patrol craft (LPC) BNS Madhumati were deployed to the mission from 17 May 2010 to 14 June 2014. Frigate BNS Ali Haider and large patrol craft (LPC) BNS Nirmul were deployed from 14 June 2014 to 2018. Corvette BNS Bijoy were deployed from 1 January 2018 to August 2020.So far more than two thousand personnel of the Bangladesh Navy completed the mission in Lebanon.

== Economic cooperation ==
In 2014, a business delegation from Bangladesh paid a visit to Lebanon. Lebanon has shown deep interest to import jute and jute products from Bangladesh. Besides, Bangladeshi ready made garments, fish, ceramics, leather and leather products were also identified as demanding products in the Lebanese market.

== See also ==
- Foreign relations of Bangladesh
- Foreign relations of Lebanon
