= Jalalabad Cantonment =

Bangladeshi military cantonment

Coordinates: 24.9379°N 91.9859°E

Jalalabad Cantonment
- জালালাবাদ সেনানিবাস
- Sylhet, Sylhet Division, Bangladesh

Site information
- Type: Cantonment
- Controlled by: Bangladesh Army

Garrison information
- Occupants: 17th Infantry Division; ARTDOC

Jalalabad Cantonment (Bengali: জালালাবাদ সেনানিবাস) is a cantonment located in Sylhet, Bangladesh.

Jalalabad Cantonment is the home of the Bangladesh Army's 17th Infantry Division, the School of Infantry & Tactics (SI&T), Para Commando Brigade, 1 & 2 Para Commando Battalion of Bangladesh Army.

== Installations ==
- HQ 17th Infantry Division
  - Area Headquarters, Sylhet
  - Station Headquarters, Jalalabad
    - Combined Military Hospital
    - GE (Army), Jalalabad Cantonment
  - 17th Artillery Brigade
  - 11th Infantry Brigade
  - 52nd Infantry Brigade
  - 360th Infantry Brigade
  - 17th Military Police Unit
- Para Commando Brigade
  - 1st Para Commando Battalion
  - 2nd Para Commando Battalion
- School of Infantry and Tactics
  - Special Warfare Wing
  - Army Airborne School
- Cantonment Board, Jalalabad

== Education ==
- Army Institute of Business Administration, Sylhet
- Jalalabad Cantonment Board High School
- Jalalabad Cantonment Public School & College
