= 17th Infantry Division (Bangladesh) =

Division of the Bangladesh army

- Insignia of 17th Infantry Division
- Active: 17 September 2013 - present
- Country: Bangladesh
- Branch: Bangladesh Army
- Type: Infantry
- Size: Division
- Garrison/HQ: Jalalabad Cantonment

Commanders
- Current commander: Major General Mohammed Aftab Hossain
- Notable commanders: Major General Jubayer Salehin; Major General Shamin Uz Zaman; Major General S. M. Salahuddin Islam; Major General Anwarul Momen

The 17th Infantry Division is a formation of the Bangladesh Army. It was formed as part of the development vision of Bangladesh Armed Forces Forces Goal 2030. It is located in Sylhet Division.

== History ==
The division was officially formed on 17 September 2013, according to Forces Goal-2030. Prime Minister Sheikh Hasina formally announced the raising of the division by hoisting the divisional flag at Jalalabad Cantonment. The division started its journey with the formation of 360 Infantry Brigade and the 32 and 33 Bangladesh Infantry Regiments.

On 23 November 2016, the Prime Minister laid the foundation stones of eight projects, including the division headquarters, at Sylhet Cantonment. A flag-raising ceremony of nine units, including a newly formed brigade was also held.

== Formation ==
Under the division, there are 3 infantry brigades, 8 infantry regiments, 1 artillery brigade, 3 artillery regiments and 7 other various units. One of the previous commanders, Major General Jubayer Salehin, who also served in Sylhet Area, as its Area Commander became the Commandant of the Defence Services Command and Staff College (DSCSC).

Combat Arms

- Regiment of Artillery
  - 17th Artillery Brigade
    - 18th Field Artillery Regiment
    - 22nd Field Artillery Regiment
    - 50th Field Artillery Regiment
- Infantry:
  - 11th Infantry Brigade
    - 6th Bangladesh Infantry Regiment
    - 34th Bangladesh Infantry Regiment
    - 42nd Bangladesh Infantry Regiment
    - 57th East Bengal Regiment
  - 360th Infantry Brigade
    - 13th East Bengal Regiment
    - 38th East Bengal Regiment
  - 52nd Infantry Brigade
    - 61st East Bengal Regiment
    - 64th East Bengal Regiment
    - 65th East Bengal Regiment

Combat support

- Corps of Engineers
  - 12th Engineer Battalion
- Military intelligence
  - 598th Field Intelligence Unit
- Corps of Signals
  - 8th Signal Battalion

Combat service support

- Corps of Military Police
  - 17th Military Police
- Army Services Corps
  - 38th Supply and Transport Battalion
- Ordnance Corps
  - 508th Division Ordnance Company
- Army Medical Corps
  - 91st Field Ambulance
