= List of office-holders in the Government of Bangladesh =

This is a list of current office holders in various fields of the Government of Bangladesh.

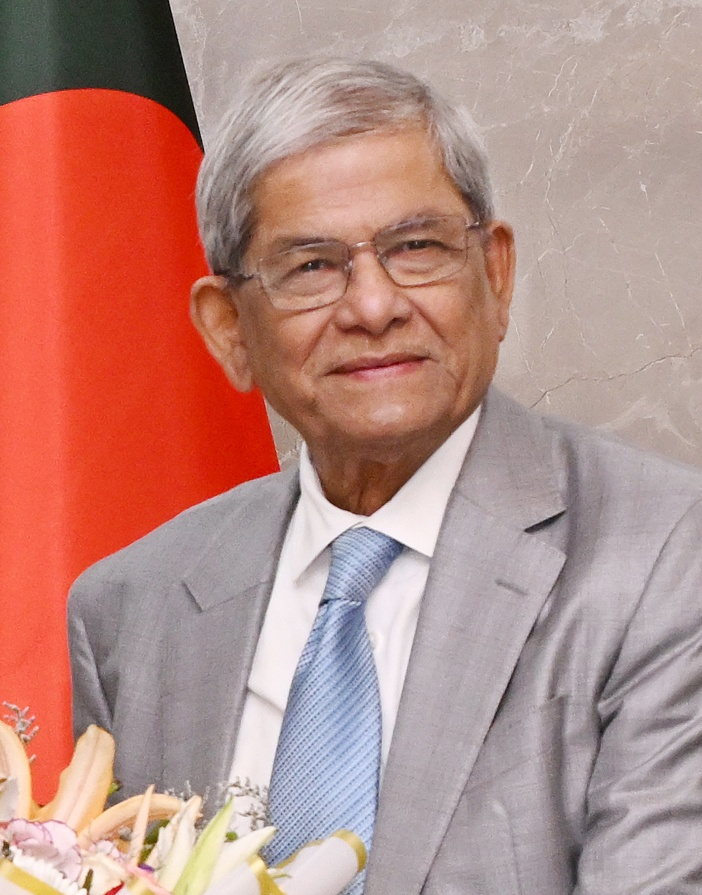
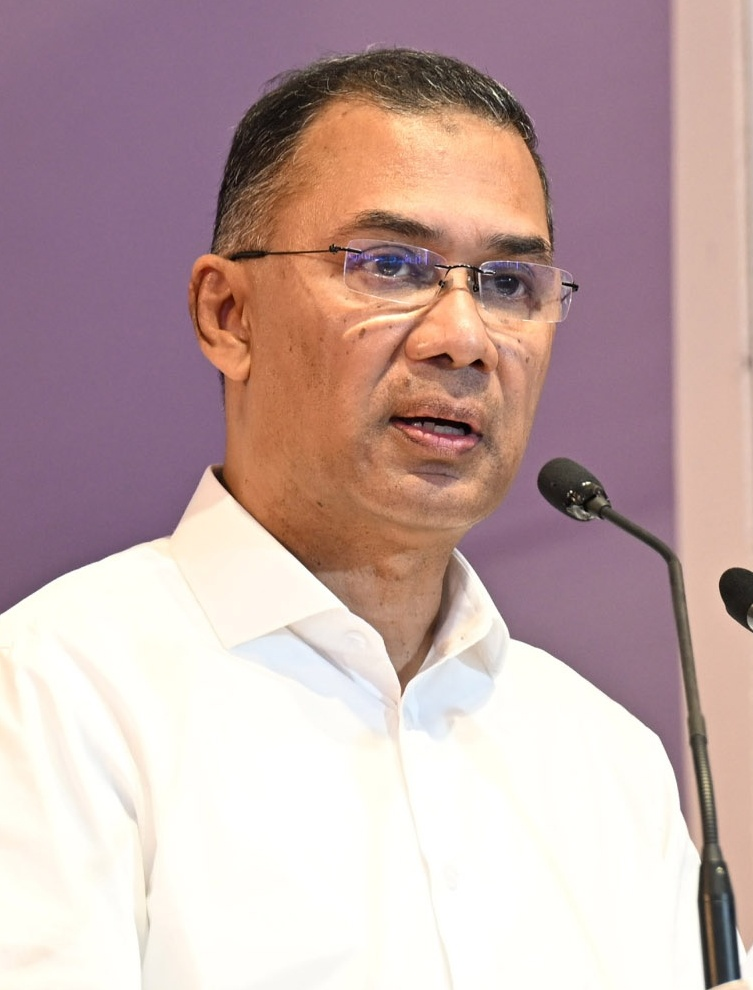
President Mirza Fakhrul Islam Alamgir (left)
and
Prime Minister Tarique Rahman (right)

The President of Bangladesh is the Head of State of Bangladesh. Since 1991, Bangladesh has been a parliamentary democracy. This makes the President a mostly ceremonial post elected by the parliament.

== List of heads of state of Bangladesh ==
Political parties

Awami League (AL)
Bangladesh Krishak Sramik Awami League (BaKSAL)
Jatiyatabadi Ganatantrik Dal (Jagodal) / Bangladesh Nationalist Party (BNP)
Janadal / Jatiya Party (JP(E))

Other affiliations

Independent

Status

Acting president

Symbols

^{†} Died in office

No.	Portrait	Name (Birth–Death)	Election	Term of office			Political party (Coalition)
No.	Portrait	Name (Birth–Death)	Election	Took office	Left office	Time in office	Political party (Coalition)
Provisional Government of Bangladesh (1971–1972)
1		Sheikh Mujibur Rahman শেখ মুজিবুর রহমান (1920–1975) (Note: Incarcerated in Pakistan till 8 January 1972.)	—	17 April 1971	12 January 1972	270 days	AL
—		Syed Nazrul Islam সৈয়দ নজরুল ইসলাম (1925–1975) (Note: Acting in the absence of Sheikh Mujibur Rahman.)	—	17 April 1971	12 January 1972	270 days	AL
People's Republic of Bangladesh (1972–present)
2		Abu Sayeed Chowdhury আবু সাঈদ চৌধুরী (1921–1987)	—	12 January 1972	24 December 1973	1 year, 346 days	AL
3		Mohammad Mohammadullah মোহাম্মদ মুহম্মদুল্লাহ (1921–1999)	—	24 December 1973	27 January 1974	1 year, 32 days	AL
3		Mohammad Mohammadullah মোহাম্মদ মুহম্মদুল্লাহ (1921–1999)	1974	27 January 1974	25 January 1975	1 year, 32 days	AL
(1)		Sheikh Mujibur Rahman শেখ মুজিবুর রহমান (1920–1975)	—	25 January 1975	15 August 1975 (Assassinated in a coup)	202 days	BaKSAL
4		Khondaker Mostaq Ahmad খন্দকার মোশতাক আহমেদ (1918–1996)	—	15 August 1975	6 November 1975 (Deposed in a coup)	83 days	AL (with military support)
5		Abu Sadat Mohammad Sayem আবু সাদাত মোহাম্মদ সায়েম (1916–1997) (Note: Also Chief Martial Law Administrator (24 August 1975 – 4 November 1975 and 7 November 1975 – 29 November 1976).)	—	6 November 1975	21 April 1977	1 year, 166 days	AL (with military support)
6		Ziaur Rahman জিয়াউর রহমান (1936–1981) (Note: Also Chief Martial Law Administrator (29 November 1976 – 6 April 1979).)	1977 (Note: Referendum.)	21 April 1977	12 June 1978	4 years, 39 days	Military / Jagodal / BNP
6		Ziaur Rahman জিয়াউর রহমান (1936–1981)	1978 (Note: Direct election.)	12 June 1978	30 May 1981 (Assassinated)	4 years, 39 days	Military / Jagodal / BNP
7		Abdus Sattar আব্দুস সাত্তার (1906–1985)	—	30 May 1981	20 November 1981	298 days	BNP
7		Abdus Sattar আব্দুস সাত্তার (1906–1985)	1981	20 November 1981	24 March 1982 (Deposed in a coup)	298 days	BNP
Post vacant (24 – 27 March 1982) (Note: During this period, Chief of Army Staff Lt. Gen. Hussain Muhammad Ershad served as Chief Martial Law Administrator and de facto head of state.)
8		A. F. M. Ahsanuddin Chowdhury আবুল ফজল মোহাম্মদ আহসানউদ্দিন চৌধুরী (1915–2001)	—	27 March 1982	10 December 1983 (Dismissed)	1 year, 258 days	Independent (with military support)
9		Hussain Muhammad Ershad হুসেইন মুহাম্মদ এরশাদ (1930–2019) (Note: Served as Chief Martial Law Administrator until 30 March 1984.)	1985; 1986	11 December 1983	6 December 1990 (Forced to resign)	6 years, 360 days	Military / Janadal / JP(E)
—		Shahabuddin Ahmed শাহাবুদ্দিন আহমেদ (1930–2022)	—	6 December 1990	10 October 1991	308 days	Independent
10		Abdur Rahman Biswas আবদুর রহমান বিশ্বাস (1926–2017)	1991	10 October 1991	9 October 1996	4 years, 365 days	BNP
11		Shahabuddin Ahmed শাহাবুদ্দিন আহমেদ (1930–2022)	1996	9 October 1996	14 November 2001	5 years, 36 days	Independent
12		A. Q. M. Badruddoza Chowdhury একিউএম বদরুদ্দোজা চৌধুরী (1930–2024)	2001	14 November 2001	21 June 2002	219 days	BNP
—		Muhammad Jamiruddin Sircar মুহাম্মদ জমির উদ্দিন সরকার (born 1931)	—	21 June 2002	6 September 2002	77 days	BNP
13		Iajuddin Ahmed ইয়াজউদ্দিন আহম্মেদ (1931–2012)	2002	6 September 2002	12 February 2009	6 years, 159 days	Independent
14		Zillur Rahman জিল্লুর রহমান (1929–2013)	2009	12 February 2009	20 March 2013^{[†]}	4 years, 36 days	AL
15		Mohammad Abdul Hamid মোহাম্মদ আব্দুল হামিদ (born 1944) (Note: Acting for Zillur Rahman until 20 March 2013.)	—	14 March 2013	24 April 2013	10 years, 41 days	AL
15		Mohammad Abdul Hamid মোহাম্মদ আব্দুল হামিদ (born 1944)	2013; 2018	24 April 2013	24 April 2023	10 years, 41 days	AL
16		Mohammed Shahabuddin মোহাম্মদ সাহাবুদ্দিন (born 1949)	2023	24 April 2023	24 July 2026	3 years, 204 days	AL
-		Hafizuddin Ahmed হাফিজ উদ্দিন আহমদ (born 1944)	-	24 July 2026	21 August 2026	113 days	BNP
17		Mirza Fakhrul Islam Alamgir মির্জা ফখরুল ইসলাম আলমগীর (born 1948)	2026	21 August 2026	Incumbent	85 days	BNP

== List of prime ministers ==
There have been ten prime ministers, one senior minister, five chief advisers, and one acting chief adviser of Bangladesh.

Note that prime ministers are numbered either bracketless or with ( ) brackets, and chief advisors are numbered using [ ] brackets. Acting officeholders are not numbered and instead denoted with —.

Political parties

Awami League (AL)
Jatiyatabadi Ganatantrik Dal (Jagodal) / Bangladesh Nationalist Party (BNP)
Bangladesh Krishak Sramik Awami League (BaKSAL)
Janadal / Jatiya Party (JP(E))

Other affiliations

Independent

Status

Acting prime minister

Symbols

^{†} Died in office

No.	Portrait	Name (Birth–Death)	Election	Term of office			Political party (Coalition)	Ministry
No.	Portrait	Name (Birth–Death)	Election	Took office	Left office	Time in office	Political party (Coalition)	Ministry
Provisional Government of Bangladesh (1971–1972)
1		Tajuddin Ahmad তাজউদ্দীন আহমদ (1925–1975)	—	17 April 1971	12 January 1972	270 days	AL	Mujib I
People's Republic of Bangladesh (1972–present)
2		Sheikh Mujibur Rahman শেখ মুজিবুর রহমান (1920–1975)	1973	12 January 1972	25 January 1975	3 years, 13 days	AL	Mujib II–III
3		Muhammad Mansur Ali মুহাম্মদ মনসুর আলী (1917–1975)	—	25 January 1975	15 August 1975 (Deposed in a coup)	202 days	BaKSAL	Mujib IV
Post abolished (15 August 1975 – 29 June 1978)
—		Mashiur Rahman মশিউর রহমান (1924–1979); Senior Minister	—	29 June 1978	12 March 1979^{[†]}	256 days	Jagodal / BNP	Zia
Post vacant (12 March – 15 April 1979)
4		Shah Azizur Rahman শাহ আজিজুর রহমান (1925–1988)	1979	15 April 1979	24 March 1982 (Deposed in a coup)	2 years, 343 days	BNP	Zia
Post abolished (24 March 1982 – 30 March 1984)
5		Ataur Rahman Khan আতাউর রহমান খান (1905–1991)	—	30 March 1984	1 January 1985	277 days	Janadal	Ershad
Post vacant (1 January 1985 – 9 July 1986)
6		Mizanur Rahman Chowdhury মিজানুর রহমান চৌধুরী (1928–2006)	1986	9 July 1986	27 March 1988	1 year, 262 days	JP(E)	Ershad
7		Moudud Ahmed মওদুদ আহমেদ (1940–2021)	1988	27 March 1988	12 August 1989	1 year, 138 days	JP(E)	Ershad
8		Kazi Zafar Ahmed কাজী জাফর আহমেদ (1939–2015)	—	12 August 1989	6 December 1990 (Fled on the president's resignation)	1 year, 116 days	JP(E)	Ershad
Post vacant (6 December 1990 – 20 March 1991)
9		Khaleda Zia খালেদা জিয়া (1945–2025)	1991; 1996 (Feb)	20 March 1991	30 March 1996	5 years, 10 days	BNP	Khaleda I–II
[1]		Muhammad Habibur Rahman মুহাম্মদ হাবিবুর রহমান (1928–2014); Chief Adviser of Caretaker Government	—	30 March 1996	23 June 1996	85 days	Independent	Habibur
10		Sheikh Hasina শেখ হাসিনা (born 1947)	1996 (Jun)	23 June 1996	15 July 2001	5 years, 22 days	AL	Hasina I
[2]		Latifur Rahman লতিফুর রহমান (1936–2017); Chief Adviser of Caretaker Government	—	15 July 2001	10 October 2001	87 days	Independent	Latifur
(9)		Khaleda Zia খালেদা জিয়া (1945–2025)	2001	10 October 2001	29 October 2006	5 years, 19 days	BNP (Four Party Alliance)	Khaleda III
[3]		Iajuddin Ahmed ইয়াজউদ্দিন আহম্মেদ (1931–2012); Chief Adviser of Caretaker Government (Note: Simultaneously served as President.)	—	29 October 2006	11 January 2007	74 days	Independent	Iajuddin
[—]		Fazlul Haque ম. ফজলুল হক (1938–2023); Acting Chief Adviser of Caretaker Government	—	11 January 2007	12 January 2007	1 day	Independent	—
[4]		Fakhruddin Ahmed ফখরুদ্দীন আহমেদ (born 1940); Chief Adviser of Caretaker Government	—	12 January 2007	6 January 2009	1 year, 360 days	Independent (with military support)	Fakhruddin
(10)		Sheikh Hasina শেখ হাসিনা (born 1947)	2008; 2014; 2018; 2024	6 January 2009	5 August 2024 (Resigned due to protests)	15 years, 212 days	AL (Grand Alliance)	Hasina II–III–IV–V
Post vacant (5 – 8 August 2024)
[5]		Muhammad Yunus মুহাম্মদ ইউনূস (born 1940); Chief Adviser of Interim Government	—	8 August 2024	17 February 2026	2 years, 98 days	Independent	Yunus
11		Tarique Rahman তারেক রহমান (born 1968)	2026	17 February 2026	Incumbent	270 days	BNP	Tarique

== List of speakers and deputy speaker ==
Political parties

- Bangladesh Awami League
- Bangladesh Nationalist Party
- Jatiya Party (Ershad)

=== Speakers ===
No.	Officeholder	From	To	Legislative body
1	Shah Abdul Hamid	10 April 1972	1 May 1972	Ganaparishad
2	Mohammad Mohammadullah	12 October 1972	27 January 1974	Ganaparishad
3	Abdul Malek Ukil	28 January 1974	5 November 1975	1st Jatiya Sangsad
4	Mirza Ghulam Hafiz	2 April 1979	23 March 1982	2nd Jatiya Sangsad
5	Shamsul Huda Chaudhury	10 July 1986	25 April 1988	3rd Jatiya Sangsad
5	Shamsul Huda Chaudhury	25 April 1988	5 April 1991	4th Jatiya Sangsad
6	Abdur Rahman Biswas	5 April 1991	10 October 1991	5th Jatiya Sangsad
7	Sheikh Razzak Ali	12 October 1991	19 March 1996	5th Jatiya Sangsad
7	Sheikh Razzak Ali	19 March 1996	14 July 1996	6th Jatiya Sangsad
8	Humayun Rashid Choudhury	14 July 1996	10 July 2001	7th Jatiya Sangsad
9	Mohammad Abdul Hamid	12 July 2001	28 October 2001	7th Jatiya Sangsad
10	Muhammad Jamiruddin Sircar	28 October 2001	25 January 2009	8th Jatiya Sangsad
11	Mohammad Abdul Hamid	25 January 2009	24 April 2013	9th Jatiya Sangsad
12	Shirin Sharmin Chaudhury	30 April 2013	29 January 2014	9th Jatiya Sangsad
12	Shirin Sharmin Chaudhury	29 January 2014	30 January 2019	10th Jatiya Sangsad
12	Shirin Sharmin Chaudhury	30 January 2019	30 January 2024	11th Jatiya Sangsad
12	Shirin Sharmin Chaudhury	30 January 2024	2 September 2024 (Note: While Parliament was dissolved on 6 August 2024, Article 74(3) of the Constitution of Bangladesh allows the Speaker to remain in office until a successor is elected. Thus, Her tenure officially ended with her resignation on 2 September 2024.)	12th Jatiya Sangsad
13	Hafiz Uddin Ahmad	12 March 2026	Incumbent	13th Jatiya Sangsad

=== Deputy speakers ===
No.	Officeholder	From	To	Legislative body
1 (Note: Inaugural and final deputy speaker of the Constituent Assembly of Bangladesh)	Mohammad Mohammadullah	10 April 1972	11 October 1972	Ganaparishad
1	Mohammad Baitullah	7 April 1973	5 November 1975	1st Jatiya Sangsad
2	Sultan Ahmed	2 April 1979	23 March 1982	2nd Jatiya Sangsad
3	Md Korban Ali	10 July 1986	25 April 1988	3rd Jatiya Sangsad
4	Md. Reazuddin Ahmed	25 April 1988	5 April 1991	4th Jatiya Sangsad
5	Sheikh Razzak Ali	5 April 1991	12 October 1991	5th Jatiya Sangsad
6	Humayun Khan Panni	14 October 1991	19 March 1996	5th Jatiya Sangsad
7	L. K. Siddiqi	19 March 1996	14 July 1996	6th Jatiya Sangsad
8	Mohammad Abdul Hamid	14 July 1996	12 July 2001	7th Jatiya Sangsad
9	Ali Ashraf	12 July 2001	28 October 2001	7th Jatiya Sangsad
10	Akhtar Hameed Siddiqui	28 October 2001	25 January 2009	8th Jatiya Sangsad
11	Shawkat Ali	25 January 2009	29 January 2014	9th Jatiya Sangsad
12	Fazle Rabbi Miah	29 January 2014	30 January 2019	10th Jatiya Sangsad
12	Fazle Rabbi Miah	30 January 2019	22 July 2022	11th Jatiya Sangsad
13	Shamsul Hoque Tuku	28 August 2022	30 January 2024	11th Jatiya Sangsad
13	Shamsul Hoque Tuku	30 January 2024	6 August 2024	12th Jatiya Sangsad
14	Kayser Kamal	12 March 2026	Incumbent	13th Jatiya Sangsad

== List of chief justices of Bangladesh ==
No.	Image	Name (birth–death)	Start of Term	End of Term	Length of Term	Appointed by (President of Bangladesh)	Ref.
1		Abu Sadat Mohammad Sayem (1916 – 1997)	16 December 1972	5 November 1975	2 years, 324 days	Abu Sayeed Chowdhury	
2		Syed A. B. Mahmud Hossain (1916 – 1981)	18 November 1975	31 January 1978	2 years, 74 days	Abu Sadat Mohammad Sayem	
3		Kemaluddin Hossain (1923 - 2013)	1 February 1978	11 April 1982	4 years, 69 days	Ziaur Rahman	
4		Fazle Kaderi Mohammad Abdul Munim (1924 – 2001)	12 April 1982	30 November 1989	7 years, 232 days	Ahsanuddin Chowdhury	
5		Badrul Haider Chowdhury (1925 – 1998)	1 December 1989	1 January 1990	31 days	Hussain Muhammad Ershad	
6		Shahabuddin Ahmed (1930 – 2022)	14 January 1990	31 January 1995	5 years, 17 days	Hussain Muhammad Ershad	
7		Muhammad Habibur Rahman (1928 – 2014)	1 February 1995	30 April 1995	88 days	Abdur Rahman Biswas	
8		Abu Taher Mohammad Afzal (born 1934)	1 May 1995	31 May 1999	4 years, 30 days	Abdur Rahman Biswas	
9		Mustafa Kamal (1933 – 2015)	1 June 1999	31 December 1999	213 days	Shahabuddin Ahmed	
10		Latifur Rahman (1936 – 2017)	1 January 2000	28 February 2001	1 year, 58 days	Shahabuddin Ahmed	
11		Mahmudul Amin Choudhury (1937 – 2019)	1 March 2001	17 June 2002	1 year, 108 days	Shahabuddin Ahmed	
12		Mainur Reza Chowdhury (1938 – 2004)	18 June 2002	22 June 2003	1 year, 4 days	Badruddoza Chowdhury	
13		Khondokar Mahmud Hasan (born 1939)	23 June 2003	26 January 2004	217 days	Iajuddin Ahmed	
14		Syed Jillur Rahim Mudasser Husain (born 1940)	27 January 2004	28 February 2007	3 years, 32 days	Iajuddin Ahmed	
15		Md. Ruhul Amin (1941 – 2024)	1 March 2007	31 May 2008	1 year, 91 days	Iajuddin Ahmed	
16		M M Ruhul Amin (1942 – 2017)	1 June 2008	22 December 2009	1 year, 204 days	Iajuddin Ahmed	
17		Md. Tafazzul Islam (born 1943)	23 December 2009	7 February 2010	46 days	Zillur Rahman	
18		Mohammad Fazlul Karim (1943 – 2024)	8 February 2010	30 September 2010	234 days	Zillur Rahman	
19		A.B.M. Khairul Haque (born 1944)	1 October 2010	17 May 2011	228 days	Zillur Rahman	
20		Md. Muzammel Hossain (born 1948)	18 May 2011	16 January 2015	3 years, 243 days	Zillur Rahman	
21		Surendra Kumar Sinha (born 1951)	17 January 2015	11 November 2017 (Resigned)	2 years, 298 days	Abdul Hamid	
Acting		Md. Abdul Wahhab Miah (born 1951)	11 November 2017	2 February 2018 (Resigned)	83 days	Abdul Hamid	
22		Syed Mahmud Hossain (born 1954)	2 February 2018	30 December 2021	3 years, 331 days	Abdul Hamid	
23		Hasan Foez Siddique (born 1956)	30 December 2021	25 September 2023	1 year, 269 days	Abdul Hamid	
24		Obaidul Hassan (born 1959)	26 September 2023	10 August 2024 (Resigned)	319 days	Mohammed Shahabuddin	
25		Syed Refaat Ahmed (born 1958)	10 August 2024	27 December 2025	2 years, 96 days	Mohammed Shahabuddin	
26		Zubayer Rahman Chowdhury (born 1961)	28 December 2025	17 May 2027	321 days	Mohammed Shahabuddin	

== List of Chief Election Commissioners of Bangladesh ==
The following have held the post of the Chief Election Commissioner of Bangladesh.

No.	Name (birth–death)	Image	Start of Term	End of Term	Length of Term	Appointed by (President of Bangladesh)	Ref.
1	Justice M. Idris (? – ?)		7 July 1972	7 July 1977	5 years, 0 days	Abu Sayeed Chowdhury	
2	Justice A.K.M. Nurul Islam (1919 – 2015)		8 July 1977	17 February 1985	7 years, 194 days	Ziaur Rahman	
3	Justice Chowdhury A.T.M. Masud (1924 - 2013)		17 February 1985	17 February 1990	5 years, 0 days	Hussain Muhammad Ershad	
4	Justice Sultan Hossain Khan (1924 – 2015)		17 February 1990	24 December 1990	310 days	Hussain Muhammad Ershad	
5	Justice Mohammad Abdur Rouf (1925 – 1998)		25 December 1990	18 April 1995	4 years, 114 days	Shahabuddin Ahmed	
6	Justice A.K.M. Sadeq (1928 – 2016)		27 April 1995	6 April 1996	345 days	Abdur Rahman Biswas	
7	Mohammad Abu Hena (born 1937)		9 April 1996	8 May 2000	4 years, 29 days	Abdur Rahman Biswas	
8	M. A. Sayed (1937 – 2013)		23 May 2000	22 May 2005	4 years, 364 days	Shahabuddin Ahmed	
9	Justice M. A. Aziz (born 1939)		23 May 2005	21 January 2007	1 year, 243 days	Iajuddin Ahmed	
10	Dr. A. T. M. Shamsul Huda (born 1943)		5 February 2007	5 February 2012	5 years, 0 days	Iajuddin Ahmed	
11	Kazi Rakibuddin Ahmed (born 1943)		9 February 2012	9 February 2017	5 years, 0 days	Zillur Rahman	
12	K. M. Nurul Huda (born 1948)		15 February 2017	17 February 2022	5 years, 2 days	Abdul Hamid	
13	Kazi Habibul Awal (born 1956)		27 February 2022	5 September 2024	2 years, 191 days	Abdul Hamid	
14	AMM Nasir Uddin (born 1953)		22 November 2024	Incumbent	1 year, 357 days	Mohammed Shahabuddin	

== Bangladesh Public Service Commission Chairpersons ==
List of chairpersons:

No.	Name	Image	Took office	Left office	Tenure	Ref.
1	A. Q. M. Bazlul Karim		15 May 1972	15 December 1977	5 years, 214 days	
2	Mohiuddin Ahmed		25 May 1972	14 December 1977	5 years, 203 days	
3	M. Moydul Islam		22 December 1977	21 December 1982	4 years, 364 days	
4	Faiz Uddin Ahmed		22 December 1982	31 May 1986	3 years, 160 days	
5	S. M. Al Hussaini		1 June 1986	1 May 1991	4 years, 334 days	
6	Iajuddin Ahmed		14 September 1991	31 January 1993	1 year, 139 days	
7	S. M. A. Foyaz		1 March 1993	5 March 1998	5 years, 4 days	
8	Md. Mustafa Chowdhury		25 March 1998	23 January 2002	3 years, 304 days	
9	Z. N. Tahomida Begum		9 May 2002	7 May 2007	4 years, 363 days	
10	Saadat Husain		9 May 2007	23 November 2011	4 years, 198 days	
11	A. T. Ahmedul Huq Chowdhury		27 November 2011	20 December 2013	2 years, 23 days	
12	Ikram Ahmed		24 December 2013	13 April 2016	2 years, 111 days	
13	Muhammed Sadique		2 May 2016	18 September 2020	4 years, 139 days	
14	Mohammed Sohrab Hossain		21 September 2020	8 October 2024	4 years, 17 days	
15	Mobasser Monem		15 October 2024	18 October 2026	2 years, 30 days	
16	Mohammad Nazmuzzaman Bhuiyan		6 September 2026	Incumbent	69 days	

== Anti-Corruption Commission (Bangladesh) ==
The Chairmen of the Anti-Corruption Commission are as follows:

- Sultan Hossain Khan (23 February 2004 – 8 February 2007)
- Hasan Mashhud Chowdhury (22 February 2007 – 2 April 2009)
- Ghulam Rahman (1 May 2009 – 23 June 2013)
- M Badiuzzaman (24 June 2013 – 6 March 2016)
- Iqbal Mahmood (14 March 2016 – 9 March 2021)
- Mohammad Moinuddin Abdullah (10 March 2021 – 29 October 2024)
- Mohammad Abdul Momen (12 December 2024 – 3 March 2026)

== List of comptrollers and auditors general ==
On 11 May 1973, the first comptroller and auditor-general was appointed by the government of Bangladesh. Since then there were 12 people who led office of the comptroller and auditor general of Bangladesh. A list is given below including the running CAG-

Order	Comptroller and Auditor General	Term start	Term end
1	Late Fazle Kader Muhammad Abdul Baqui	11 May 1973	31 December 1975
2	Osman Ghani Khan	1 March 1976	31 December 1982
3	A K Azizul Huq	1 January 1983	29 March 1989
4	Gholam Kibria	30 March 1989	31 December 1991
5	Khondkar Moazzamuddin Hossain	7 March 1992	29 March 1996
6	M. Hafizuddin Khan	3 April 1996	7 August 1999
7	Syed Yusuf Hossain	8 August 1999	4 February 2002
8	Muhammad Ahsan Ali Sarkar	5 March 2002	31 December 2002
9	Asif Ali	2 January 2003	1 January 2008
10	Ahmed Ataul Hakeem	12 February 2008	11 February 2013
11	Masud Ahmed	28 April 2013	26 April 2018
12	Mohammad Muslim Chowdhury	17 July 2018	16 July 2023
13	Md. Nurul Islam	26 July 2023	Incumbent

== List of attorneys general ==
No.	Name	Took office	Left office	Tenure
1	M. H. Khandaker	21 January 1972	17 December 1972	331 days
2	Faqueer Shahabuddin Ahmad	18 December 1972	21 March 1976	3 years, 94 days
3	Syed Ishtiaq Ahmed	22 March 1976	6 May 1976	45 days
4	Khandaker Abu Bakr	10 May 1976	13 March 1985	8 years, 307 days
5	M. Nurullah	14 March 1985	6 April 1990	5 years, 23 days
6	Rafique Ul Huq	7 April 1990	17 December 1990	254 days
7	Aminul Haque	18 December 1990	13 July 1995	4 years, 207 days
8	M. Nurullah	26 July 1995	26 June 1996	336 days
9	K. S. Nabi	31 July 1996	30 May 1998	1 year, 303 days
10	Mahmudul Islam	16 July 1998	9 October 2001	3 years, 85 days
11	A. F. Hassan Ariff	14 October 2001	30 April 2005	3 years, 198 days
12	A. J. Mohammad Ali	30 April 2005	24 January 2007	1 year, 269 days
13	Fida M. Kamal	5 February 2007	16 July 2008	1 year, 162 days
14	Salahuddin Ahmad	20 July 2008	12 January 2009	176 days
15	Mahbubey Alam	13 January 2009	27 September 2020	11 years, 258 days
16	A. M. Amin Uddin	11 October 2020	7 August 2024	3 years, 301 days
17	Md Asaduzzaman	8 August 2024	28 December 2025	1 year, 142 days
—	Mohammad Arshadur Rouf (acting)	Jan 1 2026	March 25 2026	83 days
18	Barrister Ruhul Quddus Kazal	March 25 2026	Incumbent	

== Constitutional Office ==
Office	Name	Portrait	Term
President	Mirza Fakhrul Islam Alamgir		21 August 2026
Prime Minister	Tarique Rahman		17 February 2026
Leader of the opposition	Shafiqur Rahman		17 February 2026
Speaker of the Jatiya Sangsad	Hafiz Uddin Ahmad		12 March 2026
Chief Justice	Zubayer Rahman Chowdhury		28 December 2025
Chief Election Commissioner	AMM Nasir Uddin		22 November 2024
Chairman of the Bangladesh Public Service Commission	Mohammad Nazmuzzaman Bhuiyan		6 September 2026
Chairman of the Anti-Corruption Commission	A. K. M. Asaduzzaman		17 August 2026
Comptroller and Auditor General	Md. Nurul Islam		26 July 2023
Attorney General	Ruhul Quddus Kazal		25 March 2026

== List of Leaders of the House ==
Leader of the House (Bangladesh)

Political parties

- Bangladesh Awami League / BAKSAL
- Bangladesh Nationalist Party
- Jatiya Party

No.	Name (Birth–Death)	Portrait	Term of office		Party
1	Sheikh Mujibur Rahman (1920–1975)		12 January 1972	25 January 1975	Bangladesh Awami League
2	Muhammad Mansur Ali (1919–1975)		25 January 1975	15 August 1975 (Deposed)	BAKSAL
3	Shah Azizur Rahman (1925–1988)		15 April 1979	24 March 1982 (Deposed)	Bangladesh Nationalist Party
4	Mizanur Rahman Chowdhury (1928–2006)		9 July 1986	27 March 1988	Jatiya Party
5	Moudud Ahmed (1940–2021)		27 March 1988	12 August 1989	Jatiya Party
6	Kazi Zafar Ahmed (1939–2015)		12 August 1989	6 December 1990	Jatiya Party
7	Khaleda Zia (1945–)		20 March 1991	30 March 1996	Bangladesh Nationalist Party
8	Sheikh Hasina (1947–)		23 June 1996	15 July 2001	Bangladesh Awami League
(7)	Khaleda Zia (1945–2025)		10 October 2001	29 October 2006	Bangladesh Nationalist Party
(8)	Sheikh Hasina (1947–)		6 January 2009	5 August 2024	Bangladesh Awami League
	Position Vacant		5 August 2024	17 February 2026	
9	Tarique Rahman (1965–)		17 February 2026	Incumbent	Bangladesh Nationalist Party

== List of leaders of the opposition in Jatiya Sangsad ==
There was no opposition leader in the 1st and the 6th Parliament.

No.	Portrait	Leader of the Opposition	Party	Term of office		Sangsad
N/A	Vacant		N/A	7 March 1973	18 February 1979	1st
(1)		Asaduzzaman Khan	Bangladesh Awami League	18 February 1979	24 March 1982	2nd
(2)		Sheikh Hasina	Bangladesh Awami League	7 May 1986	3 March 1988	3rd
(3)		A. S. M. Abdur Rab	Jatiya Samajtantrik Dal	3 March 1988	27 February 1991	4th
(2)		Sheikh Hasina	Bangladesh Awami League	27 February 1991	15 February 1996	5th
N/A	Vacant		N/A	15 February 1996	12 June 1996	6th
(4)		Khaleda Zia	Bangladesh Nationalist Party	12 June 1996	15 July 2001	7th
(2)		Sheikh Hasina	Bangladesh Awami League	1 October 2001	29 October 2006	8th
(4)		Khaleda Zia	Bangladesh Nationalist Party	29 December 2008	9 January 2014	9th
(5)		Rowshan Ershad	Jatiya Party (Ershad)	9 January 2014	3 January 2019	10th
(6)		Hussain Muhammad Ershad	Jatiya Party (Ershad)	3 January 2019	14 July 2019	11th
N/A	Vacant		N/A	14 July 2019	9 September 2019	11th
(5)		Rowshan Ershad	Jatiya Party (Ershad)	9 September 2019	10 January 2024	11th
(7)		GM Quader	Jatiya Party (Ershad)	28 January 2024	6 August 2024	12th
(8)		Shafiqur Rahman	Bangladesh Jamaat-e-Islami	17 February 2026	Incumbent	13th

== Chief Whip (Bangladesh) ==
1. Shah Moazzem Hossain
2. Abul Hasanat Abdullah
3. T.I.M. Fazlay Rabbi Chowdhury
4. M. A. Sattar
5. Khandaker Delwar Hossain
6. Khandaker Delwar Hossain
7. Abul Hasnat Abdullah
8. Md. Abdus Shahid
9. A. S. M. Feroz
10. Noor-E-Alam Chowdhury Liton
11. Nurul Islam Moni

Office	Name	Portrait	Since
Deputy Speaker of the Jatiya Sangsad	Kayser Kamal		12 March 2026
Leader of the House	Tarique Rahman		17 February 2026
Leader of the Opposition	Shafiqur Rahman		17 February 2026
Chief Whip	Nurul Islam Moni		17 February 2026

== List of defence secretaries ==
Number	Name	Term start	Term end	Reference
1	Abdus Samad	18 December 1971	22 January 1972	
2	Osman Gani Khan	22 January 1972	6 June 1973	
3	Md. Mujibul Haque	6 June 1973	30 October 1975	
4	Faiz Uddin Ahmed	4 November 1975	18 September 1978	
5	ASHK Sadek	18 September 1978	21 April 1982	
6	Salahuddin Ahmed	21 April 1982	1 October 1983	
7	ASHK Sadek	1 November 1983	2 May 1985	
8	A.M. Anisuzzaman	29 June 1985	23 June 1986	
9	Kazi Jalal Uddin Ahmad	23 June 1986	1 January 1989	
10	Md. Shamsul Haque Chishti	1 January 1989	9 January 1990	
11	Mohammad Siddiqur Rahman	9 January 1990	25 April 1991	
12	Anisur Rahman	25 April 1991	6 August 1992	
13	M. A. Malek	1 September 1992	22 July 1993	
14	Md. Hasinur Rahman	22 July 1993	11 March 1995	
15	Md. Abdul Hakim	11 March 1995	31 July 1996	
16	Kazi Muhammad Manzoor e Mawla	1 August 1996	30 September 1997	
17	Syed Yusuf Hossain	14 July 1997	8 August 1999	
18	M. Idris Ali	16 August 1999	1 December 2001	
19	KM Ehsanul Haque Peyara	27 November 2001	5 August 2004	
20	Mejbah Uddin Ahmed	11 August 2004	28 February 2006	
21	Mahmud Hasan Mansoor	21 March 2006	8 June 2006	
22	Abu Md. Moniruzzaman Khan	18 June 2006	8 January 2007	
23	Kamrul Hasan	11 January 2007	8 February 2010	
24	Khondoker Md. Asaduzzaman	7 February 2010	3 March 2014	
25	Kazi Habibul Awal	3 March 2014	31 December 2016	
26	Akhtar Hossain Bhuiyan	1 January 2017	30 December 2019	
27	Abdullah al Mohsin Chowdhury	12 January 2020	29 June 2020	
28	Md Abu Hena Mostafa Kamal	7 July 2020	7 February 2022	

== List of foreign ministers ==
No.	Portrait	Name	Term of office		Head of Cabinet
1		Khondaker Mostaq Ahmad	14 April 1971	December 1971	Tajuddin Ahmad
2		Abdus Samad Azad	December 1971	March 1973	Tajuddin Ahmad
2		Abdus Samad Azad	December 1971	March 1973	Tajuddin Ahmad; Sheikh Mujibur Rahman
3		Kamal Hossain	March 1973	15 August 1975	Sheikh Mujibur Rahman
3		Kamal Hossain	March 1973	15 August 1975	Muhammad Mansur Ali
4		Abu Sayeed Chowdhury	15 August 1975	6 November 1975	Post abolished
5		Prof. Muhammad Shamsul Huq	November 1975	24 March 1982	
5		Prof. Muhammad Shamsul Huq	November 1975	24 March 1982	Post abolished Mashiur Rahman; Shah Azizur Rahman
6		A R Shamsud Doha	24 March 1982	June 1984	Post abolished Ataur Rahman Khan
7		Humayun Rashid Choudhury	June 1984	July 1985	Ataur Rahman Khan
8		Anisul Islam Mahmud	July 1985	6 December 1990	Ataur Rahman Khan
8		Anisul Islam Mahmud	July 1985	6 December 1990	Ataur Rahman Khan; Mizanur Rahman Chowdhury; Moudud Ahmed; Kazi Zafar Ahmed
9		Fakhruddin Ahmed	9 December 1990	15 March 1991	Shahabuddin Ahmed
10		ASM Mustafizur Rahman	20 March 1991	30 March 1996	Khaleda Zia
11		Muhammad Habibur Rahman	31 March 1996	23 June 1996	Himself
(2)		Abdus Samad Azad	23 June 1996	15 July 2001	Sheikh Hasina
12		Justice Latifur Rahman	15 July 2001	10 October 2001	Himself
12		A. Q. M. Badruddoza Chowdhury	10 October 2001	14 November 2001	Khaleda Zia
13		Morshed Khan	14 November 2001	29 October 2006	Khaleda Zia
14		Iajuddin Ahmed	29 October 2006	11 January 2007	Himself
15		Iftekhar Ahmed Chowdhury	11 January 2007	30 January 2009	Fazlul Haque
15		Iftekhar Ahmed Chowdhury	11 January 2007	30 January 2009	Fakhruddin Ahmed
15		Iftekhar Ahmed Chowdhury	11 January 2007	30 January 2009	Sheikh Hasina
16		Dipu Moni	30 January 2009	20 November 2013	Sheikh Hasina
17		Abul Hassan Mahmood Ali	20 November 2013	7 January 2019	Sheikh Hasina
18		AK Abdul Momen	7 January 2019	10 January 2024	Sheikh Hasina
18		Muhammad Hasan Mahmud	11 January 2024	5 August 2024	Sheikh Hasina
19		Md. Touhid Hossain	8 August 2024	Incumbent	Muhammad Yunus

== List of ministers, advisers and state ministers ==
No.	Portrait	Name	Designation	From	Till	Head of Government
1		Abul Hasnat Muhammad Qamaruzzaman	Minister	10 April 1971	11 January 1972	Sheikh Mujibur Rahman
2		Sheikh Mujibur Rahman	Prime Minister	11 January 1972	12 April 1972	Sheikh Mujibur Rahman
3		Abdul Mannan	Minister	12 April 1972	16 January 1973	Sheikh Mujibur Rahman
4		Abdul Malek Ukil	Minister	16 January 1973	1 February 1974	Sheikh Mujibur Rahman
5		Muhammad Mansur Ali	Minister	1 February 1974	15 August 1975	Sheikh Mujibur Rahman
6		Khondaker Mostaq Ahmad	Minister	15 August 1975	7 November 1975	Khondaker Mostaq Ahmad
7		Ziaur Rahman	Deputy Chief Martial Law Administrator	7 November 1975	6 July 1978	Ziaur Rahman
8		Abu Saleh Mohammad Mustafizur Rahman	Minister	6 July 1978	27 November 1981	Ziaur Rahman
9		M.A. Matin	Minister	27 November 1981	24 March 1982	Abdus Sattar
10		Hussain Muhammad Ershad	Chief Martial Law Administrator	24 March 1982	17 July 1982	Hussain Muhammad Ershad
11		Mohabbat Jan Chowdhury	Minister	17 July 1982	19 July 1983	Hussain Muhammad Ershad
12		Abdul Mannan Siddique	Minister	19 July 1983	17 February 1986	Hussain Muhammad Ershad
13		Mahmudul Hasan	Minister	17 February 1986	1 December 1986	Hussain Muhammad Ershad
14		M.A. Matin	Minister	1 December 1986	21 March 1989	Hussain Muhammad Ershad
15		Mahmudul Hasan	Minister	21 March 1989	6 December 1990	Hussain Muhammad Ershad
16		Shahabuddin Ahmed	President	6 December 1990	7 April 1991	Shahabuddin Ahmed
17		Khaleda Zia	Prime Minister	7 April 1991	19 September 1991	Khaleda Zia
18		Abdul Matin Chowdhury	Minister	19 September 1991	21 March 1996	Khaleda Zia
19		Khandaker Mosharraf Hossain	Minister	21 March 1996	30 March 1996	Khaleda Zia
20		Muhammad Habibur Rahman	Chief Adviser	30 March 1996	24 June 1996	Muhammad Habibur Rahman
21		Rafiqul Islam	Minister	24 June 1996	2 March 1999	Sheikh Hasina
22		Mohammed Nasim	Minister	2 March 1999	16 July 2001	Sheikh Hasina
23		Latifur Rahman	Chief Adviser	16 July 2001	11 October 2001	Latifur Rahman
24		Altaf Hossain Chowdhury	Minister	11 October 2001	26 March 2004	Khaleda Zia
25		Lutfozzaman Babar	State Minister	28 March 2004	28 October 2006	Khaleda Zia
26		Iajuddin Ahmed	Chief Adviser	29 October 2006	11 January 2007	Iajuddin Ahmed
27		M. A. Matin	Adviser	16 January 2008	6 January 2009	Fakhruddin Ahmed
28		Sahara Khatun	Minister	7 January 2009	17 September 2012	Sheikh Hasina
29		Muhiuddin Khan Alamgir	Minister	18 September 2012	21 November 2013	Sheikh Hasina
30		Sheikh Hasina	Prime Minister	21 November 2013	14 July 2015	Sheikh Hasina
31		Asaduzzaman Khan	Minister	15 July 2015	6 August 2024	Sheikh Hasina
32		M. Sakhawat Hossain	Adviser	9 August 2024	16 August 2024	Muhammad Yunus
33		Jahangir Alam Chowdhury	Adviser	16 August 2024	Incumbent	Muhammad Yunus

== Finance Ministers ==
No.	Portrait	Name	Took office	Left office	Head of government
1		Tajuddin Ahmad	13 April 1972	16 March 1973	Sheikh Mujibur Rahman
2		Sheikh Mujibur Rahman	16 March 1973	15 August 1975	Sheikh Mujibur Rahman
3		Muhammad Yusuf Ali	20 August 1975	9 November 1975	Khondaker Mostaq Ahmad
4		Ziaur Rahman	10 November 1975	14 April 1979	Abu Sadat Mohammad Sayem; Ziaur Rahman
5		Mirza Nurul Huda	15 April 1979	24 April 1980	Ziaur Rahman
6		M. Saifur Rahman	25 April 1980	11 January 1982	Ziaur Rahman; Abdus Sattar
7		Fasihuddin Mahtab	12 January 1982	26 March 1982	Abdus Sattar
8		Abul Maal Abdul Muhith	31 March 1982	9 January 1984	Hussain Muhammad Ershad
9		M Syeduzzaman	9 January 1984	26 December 1987	Hussain Muhammad Ershad
10		A. K. Khandker	28 December 1987	22 March 1990	Hussain Muhammad Ershad
11		Mohammad Abdul Munim	22 March 1990	6 December 1990	Hussain Muhammad Ershad
12		Mahmoud Kafil Uddin	10 December 1990	27 December 1990	Shahabuddin Ahmed
13		Rehman Sobhan	27 December 1990	27 December 1990	Shahabuddin Ahmed
14		M. Saifur Rahman	20 March 1991	30 March 1996	Khaleda Zia
15		Wahiduddin Mahmud	30 March 1996	23 June 1996	Muhammad Habibur Rahman
16		Shah A M S Kibria	23 June 1996	15 July 2001	Sheikh Hasina
17		M Hafizuddin Khan	16 July 2001	10 October 2001	Latifur Rahman
18		M. Saifur Rahman	10 October 2001	28 October 2006	Khaleda Zia
19		Akbar Ali Khan	31 October 2006	12 December 2006	Iajuddin Ahmed
20		Shoeb Ahmed	13 December 2006	11 January 2007	Iajuddin Ahmed
21		A. B. Mirza Azizul Islam	14 January 2007	6 January 2009	Fakhruddin Ahmed
22		Abul Maal Abdul Muhith	6 January 2009	7 January 2019	Sheikh Hasina
23		Mustafa Kamal	7 January 2019	10 January 2024	Sheikh Hasina
24		Abul Hassan Mahmood Ali	11 January 2024	6 August 2024	Sheikh Hasina
25		Salehuddin Ahmed	8 August 2024	Incumbent	Muhammad Yunus

== Ministers of Law, Justice and Parliamentary Affairs ==
No.	Officeholder	Designation	From	To	Administration
1	Kamal Hossain	Minister	January 1972	March 1973	Mujib II
2	Manoranjan Dhar	Minister	16 March 1973	15 August 1975	Mujib III; BAKSAL
3	Abu Sadat Mohammad Sayem	Adviser	10 November 1975	21 January 1977	Mostaq; Sayem
4	Abdus Sattar	Minister	21 January 1977	30 May 1981	Zia
5	Tafazzal Hossain Khan	Minister	27 November 1981	12 February 1982	Sattar
6	Shah Azizur Rahman	Minister	12 February 1982	27 March 1982	Ershad
7	Khandaker Abu Bakr	Minister	27 March 1982	1 June 1984	Ershad
8	Ataur Rahman Khan	Minister	1 June 1984	19 January 1985	Ershad
9	AR Yusuf	Minister	19 January 1985	17 February 1985	Ershad
10	A. K. M. Nurul Islam	Minister	18 February 1985	12 August 1989	Ershad
11	Moudud Ahmed	Minister	26 August 1989	2 May 1990	Ershad
12	Habibul Islam Bhuiyan	Minister	2 May 1990	6 December 1990	Ershad
13	M A Khaleq	Adviser	9 December 1990	20 March 1991	Shahabuddin
14	Mirza Ghulam Hafiz	Minister	20 March 1991	18 March 1996	Khaleda I
15	Muhammad Jamiruddin Sircar	Minister	19 March 1996	30 March 1996	Khaleda I
16	Syed Ishtiaq Ahmed	Adviser	31 March 1996	23 June 1996	Habibur
17	Abdul Matin Khasru	Minister	14 January 1997	15 July 2001	Hasina I
18	Syed Ishtiaq Ahmed	Adviser	15 July 2001	10 October 2001	Latifur
19	Moudud Ahmed	Minister	10 October 2001	28 October 2006	Khaleda III
20	Mohammad Fazlul Haque	Adviser	31 October 2006	12 January 2007	Iajuddin
21	Mainul Hosein	Adviser	14 January 2007	8 January 2008	Fakhruddin
22	A. F. Hassan Ariff	Adviser	10 January 2008	6 January 2009	Fakhruddin
23	Shafique Ahmed	Minister	6 January 2009	21 November 2013	Hasina II
24	Anisul Huq	Minister	12 January 2014	6 August 2024	Hasina III; Hasina IV; Hasina V
25	Asif Nazrul	Adviser	9 August 2024	Incumbent	Yunus

== Education Ministers ==
No.	Portrait	Name	Designation	Took office	Left office	Head of Cabinet
1		Muhammad Yusuf Ali	Minister	29 December 1971	26 January 1975	Sheikh Mujibur Rahman
2		Muzaffar Ahmed Chowdhury	Minister	26 January 1975		Sheikh Mujibur Rahman
2		Muzaffar Ahmed Chowdhury	Minister	26 January 1975	6 November 1975	Sheikh Mujibur Rahman
2		Muzaffar Ahmed Chowdhury	Minister	26 January 1975	6 November 1975	Khondaker Mostaq Ahmad
3		Ziaur Rahman	Chief of Army	10 November 1975	26 November 1975	Abu Sadat Mohammad Sayem
4		Abul Fazal	Adviser	26 November 1975	22 June 1977	Abu Sadat Mohammad Sayem
4		Abul Fazal	Adviser	26 November 1975		Shah Azizur Rahman
5		Syed Ali Ahsan	Adviser	22 June 1977	29 June 1978	Shah Azizur Rahman
6		Kazi Zafar Ahmed	Minister	4 July 1978	11 October 1978	Shah Azizur Rahman
7		Abdul Baten	State Minister	11 October 1978	15 April 1979	Shah Azizur Rahman
8		Shah Azizur Rahman	Prime Minister	15 April 1979	11 February 1982	Shah Azizur Rahman
9		Tafazzal Hossain Khan	Minister	11 February 1982	24 March 1982	Hussain Muhammad Ershad
10		A. Majeed Khan	Adviser	26 May 1982	11 December 1983	Hussain Muhammad Ershad
11		A. Majeed Khan	Minister	11 December 1983	1 June 1984	Hussain Muhammad Ershad
12		Shamsul Huda Chaudhury	Minister	1 June 1984	15 January 1985	Hussain Muhammad Ershad
13		Shamsul Huda Chaudhury	Minister	4 August 1985	16 February 1986	Hussain Muhammad Ershad
14		M. A. Matin	Minister	16 February 1986	23 March 1986	Hussain Muhammad Ershad
15		A. K. M. Nurul Islam	Minister	24 March 1986	25 May 1986	Hussain Muhammad Ershad
16		M. A. Matin	Minister	25 May 1986	9 July 1986	Hussain Muhammad Ershad
17		Momen Uddin Ahmed	Minister	9 July 1986	30 November 1986	Hussain Muhammad Ershad
18		Mahbubur Rahman	Minister	30 November 1986	27 March 1988	Hussain Muhammad Ershad
19		Anisul Islam Mahmud	Minister	27 March 1988	10 December 1988	Hussain Muhammad Ershad
20		Sheikh Shahidul Islam	Minister	10 December 1988	2 May 1990	Hussain Muhammad Ershad
21		Kazi Zafar Ahmed	Prime Minister	2 May 1990	6 December 1990	Hussain Muhammad Ershad
22		Zillur Rahman Siddiqui	Adviser	10 December 1990	16 March 1991	Shahabuddin Ahmed
23		A. Q. M. Badruddoza Chowdhury	Minister	20 March 1991	19 September 1991	Khaleda Zia
24		Muhammad Jamiruddin Sircar	Minister	19 September 1991	19 March 1996	Khaleda Zia
25		Rafiqul Islam Miah	Minister	19 March 1996	30 March 1996	Khaleda Zia
26		Md. Shamsul Haque	Adviser	3 April 1996	23 June 1996	Muhammad Habibur Rahman
27		ASHK Sadek	Minister	23 June 1996	15 July 2001	Sheikh Hasina
28		ASM Shahjahan	Adviser	16 July 2001	10 October 2001	Latifur Rahman
29		Osman Faruk	Minister	11 October 2001	28 October 2006	Khaleda Zia
30		Iajuddin Ahmed	Chief Advisor	1 November 2006	11 January 2007	Iajuddin Ahmed
31		Ayub Quadri	Adviser	16 January 2007	26 December 2007	Fakhruddin Ahmed
32		Hossain Zillur Rahman	Adviser	10 January 2008	6 January 2009	Fakhruddin Ahmed
33		Nurul Islam Nahid	Minister	6 January 2009	7 January 2019	Sheikh Hasina
34		Dipu Moni	Minister	7 January 2019	11 January 2024	Sheikh Hasina
35		Mohibul Hasan Chowdhury	Minister	11 January 2024	5 August 2024	Sheikh Hasina
36		Wahiduddin Mahmud	Adviser	16 August 2024	5 March 2024	Muhammad Yunus
37		Chowdhury Rafiqul Abrar	Adviser	5 March 2025	Incumbent	Muhammad Yunus

== Ministry of Information and Broadcasting ==
Ministry of Information and Broadcasting

== Cabinet Ministers ==
Office	Name	Portrait	Since
Minister of Home Affairs			
Minister of Finance			
Minister of Foreign Affairs			
Minister of Defence			
Minister of Law, Justice and Parliamentary Affairs			
Minister of Education			
Minister of Information			

== List of Cabinet Secretaries ==
The position holder is responsible for ensuring that the Civil Service has the skills and capabilities necessary to meet everyday challenges, and that the civil servants work in a fair and decent environment.

Sl	Name	Year
1	Hossain Toufique Imam	1971 to 1975
2	Shafiul Azam	1975 to 1976
3	Abdul Momen Khan	1976 to 1977
4	M. Keramat Ali	1977 to 1982
5	Mohammad Mahbubuzzaman	1982 to 1986
6	Md. Mujibul Hoque	1986 to 1989
7	M. K. Anwar	1990 to 1991
8	Md. Siddiqur Rahman	1991 to 1992
9	M. Ayubur Rahman	1992 to 1996
10	Syed Ahmed	1996 to 1997
11	Ataul Haque	1997 to 1998
12	Qazi Shamsul Alam	1998 to 2001
13	Dr. Akbar Ali Khan	2001 to 2002
14	Dr. Kamal Uddin Siddique	2002 to 2002
15	Dr. Saadat Husain	2002 to 2005
16	A S M Abdul Halim	2005 to 2006
17	Md. Abu Solaiman Chowdhury	2006 to 2006
18	Ali Imam Majumder	2006 to 2008
19	Md Abdul Aziz	2008 to 2011
20	M Musharraf Hossain Bhuiyan	2011 to 2015
21	Mohammad Shafiul Alam	2015 to 2019
22	Khandker Anwarul Islam	2019 to 2022
23	Kabir Bin Anwar	2022 to 2023
24	Md. Mahbub Hossain	2023 to 2024
25	Sheikh Abdur Rashid	2024 to 2026

== Prime Minister's Office ==
Prime Minister's Office

Chief Adviser's Office

== List of Foreign Secretaries ==
No.	Name	From	To
1	Abul Fateh	30.12.1971	16.01.1972
2	Sayyid Anwarul Karim	17.01.1972	14.07.1972
3	Enayet Karim	14.07.1972	16.02.1974
4	Fakhruddin Ahmed	22.10.1974	15.11.1975
5	Tabarak Hussain	15.11.1975	06.09.1978
6	Shah A M S Kibria	06.12.1978	02.05.1981
7	Humayun Rashid Choudhury	16.06.1981	01.06.1982
8	A.H. Ataul Karim	01.06.1982	07.10.1984
9	Faruq Ahmed Choudhury	07.10.1984	17.07.1986
10	Fakhruddin Ahmed	17.07.1986	08.05.1987
11	A. K. M. Nazrul Islam	09.05.1987	19.07.1988
12	Mohammed Mohsin	19.07.1988	25.06.1989
13	A.K.H Morshed	25.06.1989	21.10.1989
14	Abul Ahsan	05.11.1989	19.09.1991
15	Reaz Rahman	19.09.1991	13.12.1993
16	M.R. Osmany	13.12.1993	09.02.1995
17	Farooq Sobhan	07.03.1995	16.09.1997
18	Mustafizur Rahman	16.09.1997	27.02.1999
19	C.M Shafi Sami	23.03.1999	26.01.2001
20	Syed Muazzem Ali	11.03.2001	17.07.2001
21	Shamsher M. Chowdhury BB	24.10.2001	17.03.2005
22	Hemayet Uddin	17.03.2005	10.12.2006
23	Md. Touhid Hossain	17.12.2006	08.07.2009
24	Mohammed Mijarul Quayes	09.07.2009	02.12.2012
25	Shahidul Haque	10.01.2013	30.12.2019
26	Masud Bin Momen	31.12.2019	01.09.2024
27	Md. Jashim Uddin	08.09.2024	23.05.25
28	Md. Ruhul Alam Siddique	23.05.2025	Present

== Ministry of Home Affairs ==
Ministry of Home Affairs

== List of Finance Secretaries ==
List of Tenures
No.	Name	Tenure	Reference
1	Khandaker Asaduzzaman	22 April 1971 to 16 January 1972	
2	M. Motiul Islam	17 January 1972 to 11 October 1973	
3	Kofil Uddin Mahmud	12 October 1973 to 6 February 1976	
4	M. Saiduzzaman	6 February 1976 to 1 July 1977	
5	S.A. Khair	1 July 1977 to 6 February 1980	
6	Golam Kibria	6 February 1980 to 24 October 1982	
7	M. Saiduzzaman	24 October 1982 to 8 January 1984	
8	M. Mustafizur Rahman	5 February 1984 to 12 January 1987	
9	Golam Kibria	1 February 1987 to 31 December 1988	
10	M.K. Anwar	1 January 1989 to 31 December 1989	
11	Khorshed Alam	2 January 1990 to 13 January 1992	
12	Nasim Uddin Ahmed	14 January 1992 to 22 November 1995	
13	Akbar Ali Khan	23 November 1995 to 30 June 2001	
14	Zakir Ahmed Khan	1 July 2001 to 31 July 2005	
15	Siddiqur Rahman Chowdhury	1 August 2005 to 21 January 2007	
16	Mohammad Tarek	22 January 2007 to 31 July 2012	
17	Fazle Kabir	1 August 2012 to 3 July 2014	
18	Mahbub Ahmed	6 July 2014 to 28 February 2017	
19	Hedayetullah Al Mamoon	1 March 2017 to 3 October 2017	
20	Mohammad Muslim Chowdhury	3 October 2017 to 17 July 2018	
21	Abdur Rouf Talukder	17 July 2018 to 11 July 2022	
22	Fatima Yasmin	17 July 2022 to 28 August 2023	
23	Md Khairuzzaman Mozumder	29 August 2023 to present	

== Ministry of Public Administration ==
Ministry of Public Administration

== Bureaucrats ==
Office	Name	Since
Cabinet Secretary	Sheikh Abdur Rashid	14 October 2024
Principal Secretary to the Chief Adviser	Md. Siraj Uddin Miah	2 October 2024
Foreign Secretary	Md. Ruhul Alam Siddique (Acting)	23 May 2025
Home Secretary	Nasimul Gani (Senior Secretary)	22 December 2024
Finance Secretary	Khairuzzaman Mozumder	29 August 2023
Defence Secretary	Md. Ashraf Uddin	30 May 2024
Public Administration Secretary	Md. Mokhlesur Rahman (Senior Secretary)	28 August 2024

== Defence and Security ==
Occupation	Name	Portrait	Since
Chief of Army Staff	General Waker-uz-Zaman		23 June 2024
Chief of Air Staff	Air Chief Marshal Hasan Mahmood Khan		12 June 2024
Chief of Naval Staff	Admiral Khondkar Misbah-ul-Azim		23 July 2026
Principal Staff Officer	Lt. Gen. Mir Mushfiqur Rahman		22 February 2026
Director General of Border Guards Bangladesh	Maj. Gen. Mohammad Ashrafuzzaman Siddiqui		5 February 2024
Director General of the Directorate General of Forces Intelligence	Maj. Gen. Mohammad Kaiser Rashid Chowdhury		22 February 2026
Inspector General of Police	IGP Md. Ali Hossain Fakir		24 February 2026

== Chief of Army Staff Appointees ==
The following table chronicles the appointees, to the office of the Chief of Army Staff or its preceding positions since the independence war of Bangladesh.

=== Commander-in-Chief, Mukti Bahini (1971–1972) ===
No.	Picture	Commander-in-Chief	Took office	Left office	Time in office	Unit of Commission
1	M. A. G. Osmani psc	General; M. A. G. Osmani psc (1918–1984)	12 April 1971	6 April 1972	360 days	Army Service Corps

=== Chief of staff, Mukti Bahini (1971–1972) ===
No.	Picture	Chief of staff	Took office	Left office	Time in office	Unit of Commission
1	Mohammad Abdur Rab Bir Uttom	Major General; Mohammad Abdur Rab Bir Uttom (1919–1975)	11 July 1971	6 April 1972	270 days	Army Service Corps

=== Chiefs of Army staff (1971–present) ===
No.	Picture	Chief of Army Staff	Took office	Left office	Time in office	Unit of Commission
1	M. A. G. Osmani psc	General; M. A. G. Osmani psc (1918–1984)	12 April 1971	6 April 1972	1 year, 24 days	Army Service Corps
2	Kazi Muhammad Shafiullah Bir Uttom, psc	Major general Kazi Muhammad Shafiullah Bir Uttom, psc (1934–2025)	7 April 1972	25 August 1975	3 years, 140 days	East Bengal Regiment
3	Ziaur Rahman Bir Uttom, psc	Major general Ziaur Rahman Bir Uttom, psc (1936–1981)	25 August 1975	3 November 1975	70 days	East Bengal Regiment
-	Khaled Mosharraf Bir Uttom, psc	Major general Khaled Mosharraf Bir Uttom, psc (1937–1975)	3 November 1975	7 November 1975 †	4 days	East Bengal Regiment
(3)	Ziaur Rahman Bir Uttom, psc	Lieutenant general Ziaur Rahman Bir Uttom, psc (1936–1981)	7 November 1975	28 April 1978	2 years, 172 days	East Bengal Regiment
4	Hussain Muhammad Ershad ndc, psc	Lieutenant general Hussain Muhammad Ershad ndc, psc (1930–2019)	29 April 1978	30 August 1986	8 years, 123 days	East Bengal Regiment
5	Atiqur Rahman G+	Lieutenant general Atiqur Rahman G+ (1931–2023)	31 August 1986	30 August 1990	3 years, 364 days	Regiment of Artillery
6	Nuruddin Khan psc	Lieutenant general Nuruddin Khan psc (born 1940)	31 August 1990	30 August 1994	3 years, 364 days	Corps of Engineers
7	Abu Saleh Mohammad Nasim Bir Bikrom, psc	Lieutenant general Abu Saleh Mohammad Nasim Bir Bikrom, psc (born 1943)	31 August 1994	19 May 1996	1 year, 262 days	East Bengal Regiment
8	Muhammad Mahbubur Rahman psc	Lieutenant general Muhammad Mahbubur Rahman psc	27 May 1996	23 December 1997	1 year, 210 days	Corps of Engineers
9	Mustafizur Rahman Bir Bikrom, ndc, psc, C	General; Mustafizur Rahman Bir Bikrom, ndc, psc, C (1941–2008)	24 December 1997	23 December 2000	2 years, 365 days	Corps of Engineers
10	Mohammed Harun-Ar-Rashid Bir Protik, rcds, psc	Lieutenant general Mohammed Harun-Ar-Rashid Bir Protik, rcds, psc (born 1948)	24 December 2000	15 June 2002	1 year, 173 days	East Bengal Regiment
11	Hasan Mashhud Chowdhury awc, psc	Lieutenant general Hasan Mashhud Chowdhury awc, psc (born 1948)	16 June 2002	15 June 2005	2 years, 364 days	East Bengal Regiment
12	Moeen Uddin Ahmed ndc, psc	General; Moeen Uddin Ahmed ndc, psc (born 1953)	16 June 2005	15 June 2009	3 years, 364 days	East Bengal Regiment
13	Mohammed Abdul Mubeen ndc, psc	General; Mohammed Abdul Mubeen ndc, psc (born 1957)	16 June 2009	25 June 2012	3 years, 9 days	East Bengal Regiment
14	Iqbal Karim Bhuiyan psc	General; Iqbal Karim Bhuiyan psc (born 1957)	26 June 2012	25 June 2015	2 years, 364 days	East Bengal Regiment
15	Abu Belal Muhammad Shafiul Haq ndc, psc	General; Abu Belal Muhammad Shafiul Haq ndc, psc (born 1958)	26 June 2015	25 June 2018	2 years, 364 days	Armoured Corps
16	Aziz Ahmed SBP, BSP, BGBM, PBGM, BGBMS, psc, G	General; Aziz Ahmed SBP, BSP, BGBM, PBGM, BGBMS, psc, G (born 1961)	25 June 2018	24 June 2021	2 years, 364 days	Regiment of Artillery
17	SM Shafiuddin Ahmed SBP, OSP, ndu, psc, PhD	General; SM Shafiuddin Ahmed SBP, OSP, ndu, psc, PhD (born 1963)	24 June 2021	23 June 2024	2 years, 365 days	East Bengal Regiment
18	Waker-Uz-Zaman OSP, SGP, psc	General; Waker-Uz-Zaman OSP, SGP, psc (born 1966)	23 June 2024	Incumbent	2 years, 144 days	East Bengal Regiment

== Chief of General Staff ==
Chief of General Staff (CGS) (Bengali: চীফ অব জেনারেল স্টাফ) of the Bangladesh Army is the head of operations, training and intelligence of the Bangladesh Army, he also performs important role in buying military equipment. The Chief of General staff has been a three-star rank since 2007.

== List of Chiefs of Air Staff ==
No.	Portrait	Chief of Air Staff	Took office	Left office	Time in office	Ref.
1	Abdul Karim Khandker BU, psa	Air Vice Marshal; Abdul Karim Khandker BU, psa (born 1930)	April 7, 1972	October 15, 1975	3 years, 191 days	–
2	Muhammad Ghulam Tawab SJ, SBT, psa	Air Vice Marshal; Muhammad Ghulam Tawab SJ, SBT, psa (1930–1999)	October 15, 1975	April 30, 1976	198 days	–
3	Khademul Bashar BU, TBT	Air Vice Marshal; Khademul Bashar BU, TBT (1935–1976)	May 1, 1976	September 1, 1976 †	123 days	–
4	Abdul Gafoor Mahmud TBT, psa	Air Vice Marshal; Abdul Gafoor Mahmud TBT, psa (born 1934)	September 5, 1976	December 8, 1977	1 year, 94 days	–
5	Sadruddin Mohammad Hossain BP	Air Vice Marshal; Sadruddin Mohammad Hossain BP (born 1941)	December 9, 1977	July 22, 1981	3 years, 225 days	–
6	Sultan Mahmud BU	Air Vice Marshal; Sultan Mahmud BU (1944–2023)	July 23, 1981	July 22, 1987	5 years, 364 days	–
7	Momtaz Uddin Ahmed psc	Air Vice Marshal; Momtaz Uddin Ahmed psc (born 1941)	July 23, 1987	June 4, 1991	3 years, 316 days	–
8	Altaf Hossain Chowdhury ndu, psc	Air Vice Marshal; Altaf Hossain Chowdhury ndu, psc (born 1941)	June 4, 1991	June 3, 1995	3 years, 364 days	–
9	Jamal Uddin Ahmed ndc, bems, psc	Air Marshal; Jamal Uddin Ahmed ndc, bems, psc (born 1943)	June 4, 1995	June 3, 2001	5 years, 364 days	–
10	Mohammad Rafiqul Islam ndu, psc	Air Vice Marshal; Mohammad Rafiqul Islam ndu, psc	June 4, 2001	April 8, 2002	308 days	–
11	Fakhrul Azam ndc, psc	Air Vice Marshal; Fakhrul Azam ndc, psc	April 8, 2002	April 7, 2007	4 years, 364 days	–
12	Shah Mohammad Ziaur Rahman ndc, fawc, psc	Air Marshal; Shah Mohammad Ziaur Rahman ndc, fawc, psc (born 1955)	April 8, 2007	June 12, 2012	5 years, 66 days	–
13	Muhammad Enamul Bari BBP, ndu, psc	Air Marshal; Muhammad Enamul Bari BBP, ndu, psc	June 13, 2012	June 12, 2015	2 years, 364 days	–
14	Abu Esrar BBP, ndc, acsc	Air Chief Marshal; Abu Esrar BBP, ndc, acsc (born 1961)	June 12, 2015	June 12, 2018	3 years, 0 days	–
15	Masihuzzaman Serniabat BBP, OSP, ndu, psc	Air Chief Marshal; Masihuzzaman Serniabat BBP, OSP, ndu, psc (born 1962)	June 12, 2018	June 12, 2021	3 years, 0 days	–
16	Shaikh Abdul Hannan BBP,BUP, nswc, fawc, psc	Air Chief Marshal; Shaikh Abdul Hannan BBP,BUP, nswc, fawc, psc (born 1963)	June 12, 2021	June 11, 2024	2 years, 365 days	
17	Hasan Mahmood Khan BBP, OSP, GUP, nswc, psc	Air Chief Marshal; Hasan Mahmood Khan BBP, OSP, GUP, nswc, psc (born 1966)	June 12, 2024		2 years, 155 days	

== Chief of the Naval Staff Appointees ==
The following table chronicles the appointees to the office of the Chief of the Naval Staff since the independence of Bangladesh. Prior to 2016, from 2007 the appointment was held by a Vice Admiral (three-star naval officer) and from 1972 to 2007 CNS's rank was Rear Admiral.

List of all Chief of Naval Staff of Bangladesh Navy:

No.	Picture	Chief of Naval Staff	Took office	Left office	Time in office
1	Nurul Huq	Captain; Nurul Huq (1936–2021)	7 April 1972	6 November 1973	1 year, 213 days
2	Musharraf Hussain Khan	Rear Admiral; Musharraf Hussain Khan (1932–2018)	7 November 1973	3 November 1979	5 years, 361 days
3	Mahbub Ali Khan psn	Rear Admiral; Mahbub Ali Khan psn (1934–1984)	4 November 1979	6 August 1984 †	4 years, 276 days
4	Sultan Ahmed	Rear Admiral; Sultan Ahmed (1938–2012)	6 August 1984	14 August 1990	6 years, 8 days
5	Amir Ahmed Mustafa	Rear Admiral; Amir Ahmed Mustafa	15 August 1990	2 May 1991	260 days
6	Muhammad Mohaiminul Islam (S/M), ncc, psc	Rear Admiral; Muhammad Mohaiminul Islam (S/M), ncc, psc (1941–2020)	4 June 1991	3 June 1995	3 years, 303 days
7	Mohammad Nurul Islam ncc, psc	Rear Admiral; Mohammad Nurul Islam ncc, psc	4 June 1995	3 June 1999	3 years, 303 days
8	Abu Taher ncc, psc	Rear Admiral; Abu Taher ncc, psc	4 June 1999	3 June 2002	2 years, 303 days
9	Shah Iqbal Mujtaba ndc, psc	Rear Admiral; Shah Iqbal Mujtaba ndc, psc (born 1948)	4 June 2002	9 January 2005	2 years, 281 days
10	M. Hasan Ali Khan ndc, psc	Rear Admiral; M. Hasan Ali Khan ndc, psc (1950–2013)	9 January 2005	9 February 2007	2 years, 31 days
11	Sarwar Jahan Nizam ndu, psc	Vice Admiral; Sarwar Jahan Nizam ndu, psc (born 1952)	10 February 2007	28 January 2009	2 years, 18 days
12	Zahir Uddin Ahmed (ND), NBP, BCGM, ndc, psc	Vice Admiral; Zahir Uddin Ahmed (ND), NBP, BCGM, ndc, psc (born 1957)	29 January 2009	28 January 2013	3 years, 365 days
13	M. Farid Habib (ND) NBP, OSP, BCGM, ndc, psc	Admiral; M. Farid Habib (ND) NBP, OSP, BCGM, ndc, psc (born 1959)	28 January 2013	27 January 2016	2 years, 364 days
14	Mohammad Nizamuddin Ahmed (TAS), OSP, ndc, psc	Admiral; Mohammad Nizamuddin Ahmed (TAS), OSP, ndc, psc (born 1960)	27 January 2016	26 January 2019	2 years, 364 days
15	Aurangzeb Chowdhury (G), NBP, OSP, BCGM, PCGM, BCGMS, ndc, psc	Admiral; Aurangzeb Chowdhury (G), NBP, OSP, BCGM, PCGM, BCGMS, ndc, psc (born 1959)	26 January 2019	25 July 2020	1 year, 181 days
16	M Shaheen Iqbal NBP, NUP, ndc, afwc, psc	Admiral; M Shaheen Iqbal NBP, NUP, ndc, afwc, psc (born 1964)	25 July 2020	24 July 2023	2 years, 363 days
17	Mohammad Nazmul Hassan , OSP, NPP, ndc, ncc, psc	Admiral; Mohammad Nazmul Hassan , OSP, NPP, ndc, ncc, psc (born 1967)	24 July 2023	Incumbent	3 years, 113 days

== Principal Staff Officer (Bangladesh) Appointees ==
The following table chronicles the appointees to the office of principal staff officer.

Portrait	Principal Staff Officer	Took office	Left office	Time in office	Ref.
Abul Hasanat Md Abdullah	Brigadier General; Abul Hasanat Md Abdullah	1972	1975	3–4 years	
Nurul Islam Shishu	Major General; Nurul Islam Shishu	19 January 1976	11 December 1980	4 years, 327 days	
Mir Shawkat Ali	Lieutenant General; Mir Shawkat Ali (1938–2010)	12 December 1980	30 June 1985	4 years, 200 days	
Mohammad Abdul Hamid	Major General; Mohammad Abdul Hamid (1932–2007)	1 September 1987	17 December 1990	3 years, 107 days	
Imamuzzaman Chowdhury	Major General; Imamuzzaman Chowdhury	18 December 1990	11 September 1996	5 years, 268 days	
Abdus Salam	Major General; Abdus Salam (born 1942)	15 September 1996	10 January 1999	2 years, 117 days	
Shubid Ali Bhuiyan	Major General; Shubid Ali Bhuiyan (born 1945)	12 January 1999	12 April 2004	5 years, 91 days	
A. I. M. Mostofa Reza Nur Psc	Major General; A. I. M. Mostofa Reza Nur Psc	12 April 2004	6 June 2006	2 years, 55 days	
Jahangir Alam Chowdhury Ndc, psc	Major General; Jahangir Alam Chowdhury Ndc, psc (born 1953)	8 June 2006	5 June 2007	362 days	
Masud Uddin Chowdhury Ndu, psc	Lieutenant General; Masud Uddin Chowdhury Ndu, psc (born 1954)	5 June 2007	2 June 2008	363 days	
Md Abdul Mubeen Ndc, psc	Lieutenant General; Md Abdul Mubeen Ndc, psc (born 1955)	4 June 2008	12 June 2009	1 year, 8 days	
Abdul Wadud Ndc, psc	Lieutenant General; Abdul Wadud Ndc, psc	13 June 2009	1 January 2013	3 years, 203 days	
Abu Belal Muhammad Shafiul Haque Ndc, psc	Lieutenant General; Abu Belal Muhammad Shafiul Haque Ndc, psc (born 1958)	1 January 2013	24 June 2015	2 years, 174 days	
Mainul Islam Afwc, psc	Lieutenant General; Mainul Islam Afwc, psc (born 1959)	1 July 2015	31 January 2016	214 days	
Md Mahfuzur Rahman Rcds, ndc, afwc, psc, PhD	Lieutenant General; Md Mahfuzur Rahman Rcds, ndc, afwc, psc, PhD (born 1961)	1 February 2016	24 November 2020	4 years, 298 days	
Waker-uz-Zaman	Lieutenant General; Waker-uz-Zaman (born 1966)	24 November 2020	29 December 2023	3 years, 35 days	
Mizanur Rahman Shamim	Lieutenant General; Mizanur Rahman Shamim (born 1968)	29 December 2023	6 August 2024	221 days	
SM Kamrul Hassan	Lieutenant General; SM Kamrul Hassan	21 August 2024	present	2 years, 86 days	

== Director General of Border Guard Bangladesh ==
Director Generals
No.	Name	Photo	Term Began	Term Ended
1	Major General Chitta Ranjan Datta		31 July 1972	21 February 1974
2	Major General M Khalilur Rahman		22 February 1974	31 October 1975
3	Major General Quazi Golam Dastgir		1 November 1975	14 December 1977
4	Major General Muhammad Atiqur Rahman		15 December 1977	30 June 1982
5	Major General R A M Golam Muktadir		1 July 1982	16 July 1985
6	Major General Sofi Ahmed Chowdhury		17 July 1985	30 June 1988
7	Major General Sadiqur Rahman Chowdhury		1 July 1988	23 September 1990
8	Major General Mohammad Abdul Latif		24 September 1990	8 June 1992
9	Major General Mohammad Anwar Hossain		10 June 1992	11 February 1995
10	Major General Ejaz Ahmed Chowdhury		12 February 1995	18 July 1996
11	Major General Mohammad Azizur Rahman		25 August 1996	30 December 1999
12	Major General A. L. M. Fazlur Rahman		29 February 2000	11 July 2001
13	Major General Mohammad Abu Ishaque Ibrahim		12 July 2001	1 December 2001
14	Major General Rezaqul Haider		1 December 2001	21 January 2003
15	Major General Md Jahangir Alam Choudhury		21 January 2003	18 February 2006
16	Major General Shakil Ahmed		19 February 2006	25 February 2009
17	Major General Md Mainul Islam		28 February 2009	9 May 2010
18	Major General Md Rafiqul Islam		9 May 2010	30 June 2011
19	Major General Anwar Hussain		30 June 2011	5 December 2012
20	Major General Aziz Ahmed		5 December 2012	1 November 2016
21	Major General Abul Hossain		2 November 2016	8 March 2018
22	Major General Md Shafeenul Islam		20 March 2018	28 February 2022
23	Major General Shakil Ahmed		2 March 2022	17 January 2023
24	Major General A K M Nazmul Hasan		18 January 2023	30 January 2024
25	Major General Mohammad Ashrafuzzaman Siddiqui		5 February 2024	Incumbent

== List of Director General (DG) of Directorate of Forces Intelligence (DFI) ==
#	Rank	Name	Start of term	End of term
Director
1	Brigadier General	Abdur Rauf	1972	1975
2	Colonel	Jamil Uddin Ahmad	1975	1975
3	Air Vice Marshal	Aminul Islam Khan	1975	1977
Director-Martial Law Communication and Control Center
4	Wing Commander	Muhammad Hamidullah Khan	1977	1978
List of Director General (DG) of Directorate General of Forces Intelligence (DGFI)
5	Major General	Mohabbat Jan Chowdhury	1979	1981
6	Major General	Muhammad Abdul Hamid	1981	1987
7	Major General	Mohammad Abdul Latif	1987	1990
16	Major General	A S M Nazrul Islam	1999	2001
17	Major General	Mohammad Abdul Halim	2001	2003
18	Major General	Rezzakul Haider Chowdhury	2003	2004
19	Major General	Sadik Hasan Rumi	2004	2006
20	Major General	A T M Amin	2006	2007
21	Brigadier General	Chowdhury Fazlul Bari	2007	2008
22	Major General	Golam Mohammad	2008	2009
23	Major General	Molla Fazle Akbar	2009	2011
24	Major General	Sheikh Mamun Khaled	2011	2013
25	Major General	Mohammad Akbar Hossain	2013	2017
26	Major General	Mohammad Saiful Abedin	2017	2020
27	Major General	Mohammad Saiful Alam	2020	2021
28	Major General	Ahmed Tabrez Shams Chowdhury	2021	2022
29	Major General	Hamidul Haque	2022	2024
30	Major General	Md. Faizur Rahman	2024	14 October 2024
31	Major General	Jahangir Alam	14 October 2024	present

== Inspector General of Police (Bangladesh) ==
The Chief of Bangladesh Police is an Inspector General, which is the only three star rank of Bangladesh Police. This is a list of Inspector Generals of Police since 1947, the inception of Bangladesh as East Pakistan.

No.	Portrait	Name	Took office	Left office	Time in office	Ref.
East Pakistan (1947–1971)
1		Zakir Hossain	15 May 1947	19 October 1952	5 years, 157 days	
2		A.H.M.S Doha	20 November 1952	26 September 1956	3 years, 311 days	
3		S. A. H. M. Ismail	27 September 1956	11 October 1958	2 years, 14 days	
4		K. A. Haque	12 October 1958	31 October 1958	19 days	
5		A. K. M. Hafij Uddin	11 November 1958	25 February 1962	3 years, 106 days	
6		A. M. A. Kobir	26 February 1962	28 February 1967	5 years, 2 days	
7		A. S. M. Ahmed	1 March 1967	24 March 1969	2 years, 23 days	
8		Mohiuddin Ahmed	25 March 1969	21 January 1970	302 days	
9		Taslim Uddin Ahmed	22 January 1970	17 May 1971	1 year, 115 days	
People's Republic of Bangladesh (1971–present)
1		A Khaleque	16 December 1971	23 April 1973	1 year, 128 days	
2		A Rahim	23 April 1973	31 December 1973	252 days	
3		A H Norul Islam	31 December 1973	21 November 1975	1 year, 325 days	
4		Hossain Ahmed	21 November 1975	26 August 1978	2 years, 278 days	
5		A B M G Kibria	26 August 1978	7 February 1982	3 years, 165 days	
6		M M R Khan	8 February 1982	31 January 1984	1 year, 357 days	
7		E A Chowdhury	1 February 1984	30 December 1985	1 year, 332 days	
8		A R Khandokar	31 December 1985	28 February 1990	4 years, 59 days	
9		Taibuddin Ahmed	28 February 1990	4 January 1991	310 days	
10		A M Chowdhury	8 January 1991	20 July 1991	193 days	
11		M Enamul Haque	16 October 1991	8 July 1992	266 days	
12		A S M Shahjahan	8 July 1992	22 April 1996	3 years, 289 days	
13		M Azizul Huq	22 July 1996	16 November 1997	1 year, 117 days	
14		Md Ismail Hossain	16 November 1997	27 September 1998	315 days	
15		A Y B I Siddiky	27 September 1998	7 June 2000	1 year, 254 days	
16		Muhammed Nurul Huda	7 June 2000	6 November 2001	1 year, 152 days	
17		Mudabbir Hossain Chowdhury	6 November 2001	22 April 2003	1 year, 167 days	
18		Shahudul Haque	22 April 2003	15 December 2004	1 year, 237 days	
19		Md Ashraful Huda	15 December 2004	7 April 2005	113 days	
20		Mohammad Hadis Uddin	7 April 2005	7 May 2005	30 days	
21		Md Abdul Kaium	7 May 2005	6 July 2006	1 year, 60 days	
22		Md Anwarul Iqbal	6 July 2006	2 November 2006	119 days	
23		Khuda Baksh Chowdhury	2 November 2006	29 January 2007	88 days	
24		Nur Mohammad	29 January 2007	31 August 2010	3 years, 214 days	
25		Hassan Mahmood Khandker	31 August 2010	31 December 2014	4 years, 122 days	
26		A. K. M. Shahidul Haque	31 December 2014	31 January 2018	3 years, 31 days	
27		Mohammad Javed Patwary	31 January 2018	15 April 2020	2 years, 75 days	
28		Benazir Ahmed	15 April 2020	30 September 2022	2 years, 168 days	
29		Chowdhury Abdullah Al-Mamun	30 September 2022	6 August 2024	1 year, 311 days	
30		Md. Mainul Islam NDC	7 August 2024	20 November 2024	105 days	
31		Baharul Alam	20 November 2024	24 February 2026	1 year, 359 days	
32		Md. Ali Hossain Fakir	24 February 2026	Incumbent	263 days	
