= Maoist insurgency in Bangladesh =

Ongoing low-level insurgency in western Bangladesh

- Part of Terrorism in Bangladesh
Date	1993 – present
Location	Bangladesh, mainly Khulna
Result	Ongoing, but heavily reduced

Belligerents
Bangladesh; Armed Forces; Army; Air Force; Navy; DGFI; Police; RAB; Ansar–VDP; BGB	PBCP PBCP–J PBCP–LP PBCP–ML New PBCP GMF; PBSP PBSP (CC) PBSP–MBRM; BCP New BCP	JMB; JMJB

Commanders and leaders
Mohammed Shahabuddin; Tarique Rahman; (Bangladesh) Jahangir Alam Chowdhury; Waker-Uz-Zaman; Mizanur Rahman Shamim; Mohammad Nazmul Hassan; Hasan Mahmood Khan; Ashrafuzzaman Siddiqui; Baharul Alam; Former: (Bangladesh) Abdur Rahman Biswas; (Bangladesh) Shahabuddin Ahmed; (Bangladesh) A. Q. M. Badruddoza Chowdhury; (Bangladesh) Muhammad Jamiruddin Sircar; (Bangladesh) Iajuddin Ahmed; (Bangladesh) Zillur Rahman; (Bangladesh) Mohammad Abdul Hamid; (Bangladesh) Muhammad Habibur Rahman; (Bangladesh) Latifur Rahman; (Bangladesh) Khaleda Zia; (Bangladesh) Fazlul Haque; (Bangladesh) Fakhruddin Ahmed; (Bangladesh) Sheikh Hasina (surrendered); (Bangladesh) Abdul Matin Chowdhury; (Bangladesh) Khandaker Mosharraf Hossain; (Bangladesh) Rafiqul Islam; (Bangladesh) Mohammed Nasim; (Bangladesh) Altaf Hossain Chowdhury; (Bangladesh) Lutfozzaman Babar; (Bangladesh) M. A. Matin; (Bangladesh) Sahara Khatun; (Bangladesh) Muhiuddin Khan Alamgir; (Bangladesh) Asaduzzaman Khan (surrendered); (Bangladesh) M Sakhawat Hussain; (Bangladesh) Md. Hasinur Rahman; (Bangladesh) Md. Abdul Hakim; (Bangladesh) Monzur-I-Mowla; (Bangladesh) Syed Yusuf Hossain; (Bangladesh) M. Idris Ali; (Bangladesh) KM Ehsanul Haque Peyara; (Bangladesh) Mejbah Uddin Ahmed; (Bangladesh) Mahmud Hasan Mansoor; (Bangladesh) Abu Md. Moniruzzaman Khan; (Bangladesh) Kamrul Hasan; (Bangladesh) Khondoker Md. Asaduzzaman; (Bangladesh) Kazi Habibul Awal; (Bangladesh) Akhtar Hossain Bhuiyan; (Bangladesh) Abdullah al Mohsin Chowdhury; (Bangladesh) Md Abu Hena Mostafa Kamal; Imamuzzaman Chowdhury; Abdus Salam; Mohammad Shubid Ali Bhuiyan; A. I. M. Mostofa Reza Nur; Jahangir Alam Chowdhury; Masud Uddin Chowdhury; Md Abdul Mubeen; Abdul Wadud; Belal Shafiul Huq; Md Mainul Islam; Md Mahfuzur Rahman; Waker-uz-Zaman; Mizanur Rahman Shamim; Nuruddin Khan; Abu Saleh Mohammad Nasim; Muhammad Mahbubur Rahman; Mustafizur Rahman; M Harun-Ar-Rashid; Hasan Mashhud Chowdhury; Moeen U Ahmed; Md Abdul Mubeen; Iqbal Karim Bhuiyan; Belal Shafiul Huq; Aziz Ahmed; SM Shafiuddin Ahmed; Muhammad Mohaiminul Islam; Mohammad Nurul Islam; Abu Taher; Shah Iqbal Mujtaba; M. Hasan Ali Khan; Sarwar Jahan Nizam; Zahir Uddin Ahmed; M. Farid Habib; Mohammad Nizamuddin Ahmed; Aurangzeb Chowdhury; M Shaheen Iqbal; Altaf Hossain Chowdhury; Jamal Uddin Ahmed; Mohammad Rafiqul Islam; Fakhrul Azam; Shah Mohammad Ziaur Rahman; Enamul Bari; Abu Esrar; Masihuzzaman Serniabat; Shaikh Abdul Hannan; Mohammad Anwar Hossain; Ejaz Ahmed Chowdhury; Mohammad Azizur Rahman; A. L. M. Fazlur Rahman; Mohammad Abu Ishaque Ibrahim; Rezzakul Haider Chowdhury; Jahangir Alam Chowdhury; Shakil Ahmed †; Md Mainul Islam; Md Rafiqul Islam; Anwar Hussain; Aziz Ahmed; Abul Hossain; Md Shafeenul Islam; Shakil Ahmed; A K M Nazmul Hasan; A. S. M. Shahjahan; M. Azizul Haq; Md Ismail Hossain; A. Y. B. I. Siddiqi; Muhammad Nurul Huda; Mudabbir Hossain Chowdhury; Shahudul Haque; Ashraful Huda; Mohammad Hadis Uddin; Abdul Kaium; Anwarul Iqbal; Khoda Baksh Chowdhury; Nur Mohammad; Hassan Mahmood Khandker; A. K. M. Shahidul Haque; Mohammad Javed Patwary; Benazir Ahmed; Chowdhury Abdullah Al-Mamun; Md. Mainul Islam	Faziul Haq †; Rashidul Islam; Islam Sabuj †; Amirul Islam †; Abdur Rouf †; Sahinur Rahman †; Saidul †	Abdul Hannan (executed); Bangla Bhai (executed); Shaykh Abdur Rahman (executed); Abdun Nur; Sayed Kawsar Hossain Siddique (POW); Jakir Khandakar

Casualties and losses
25+ Security Force members dead	918+ Maoist insurgents dead 4,237+ Maoist insurgents surrendered	Thousands killed, arrested, captured, or surrendered
- Total: 1,191+ deaths

The Maoist insurgency in Bangladesh is a conflict between the Government of Bangladesh and the multiple Maoist groups within Bangladesh, such as the PBCP, New BCP, GMF, etc.

== History ==
The Purbo Banglar Communist Party was founded in 1968. During the Bangladesh Liberation War the group organised their own group of freedom fighters and fought against Pakistan and the Mukti Bahini.

In 1993 the PBCP started a war against the BCP for control over Khulna and for ideological differences (the BCP is exclusively Maoist while the PBCP had become a mixture of Maoism and Naxalism). In the 2000s the PBCP underwent several splits, the most important of which took place in 2003, forming the PBCP–J (Purbo Banglar Communist Party–Janajuddha, dedicated to socialist revolution) thus starting an internal conflict that has killed 18 people. In 2002, Gazi Kamrul, the founder of BCP, was detained from his residence during Operation Clean Heart on 23 August 2002. Since 2005 the PBCP has begun to extend its insurrection with terrorist attacks, clashing with the government and also with rival Islamist groups like the JMJB. In 2006, the PBCP–J also began to carry out attacks and clashed with the government. Between 2005 and 2006, 379 people died in the insurgency. After this period, the insurrection diminished in intensity from year to year with fewer incidents.

== Casualties ==
Year	Deaths
1993	34
1994	8
1995	2
2000	3
2001	3
2002	43
2003	133
2004	212
2005	193
2006	186
2007	72
2008	54
2009	86
2010	39
2011	19
2012	10
2013	24
2014	12
2015	14
2016	17
2017	13
2018	8
2019	3
2020	2
2021	1
2022	0
2023	0
2024	0
2025	3
Total	1,191+

From 1993 to 2022 there were 1,191+ deaths in the insurgency. From the period 2003–2006 (the most violent period of the insurgency) there were 724 deaths.

== See also ==
- Terrorism in Bangladesh
- Crime in Bangladesh
- Naxalite–Maoist insurgency in India
