= Bangladesh Police Academy =

- বাংলাদেশ পুলিশ একাডেমি
- Crest of Bangladesh Police Academy
- Sardah, Rajshahi; Bangladesh

Information
- Type: Police training
- Motto: উত্তম প্রশিক্ষণ সর্বোত্তম সেবা
- Established: 1912; 114 years ago
- Principal: G M Azizur Rahman
- Affiliation: University of Rajshahi
- Website: bpa.police.gov.bd

Bangladesh Police Academy (BPA) is the police training institute of Bangladesh Police. It is located in Sardah, Rajshahi.

== Location ==
Bangladesh Police Academy is located at Sardah under Charghat police station in Rajshahi District.

== Evolution ==
The necessity for imparting formal training to policemen was first felt in Bengal in 1893, when an experimental course of instruction limited to a period of 12 months was tried at Mill Barrack in Dhaka. The experimentation however proved positive. In the meantime, the Indian Police Commission of 1902 also recommended establishment of a Provincial Training College. So, the Police Training School at Mill Barrack, Dhaka, was transformed into Provincial Institution in 1906. On annulment of the short-lived partition of Bengal in 1911, the existing Police Training College for Bengal, Bihar, Orissa and Assam at Bhagalpur (India) went to the province of the reorganized Bihar and Orissa. As such the need for a Police Training College for the province of Bengal and Assam was felt immediately. It was not possible to run the college in Dhaka for want of adequate accommodation, proper environment and also for its non-proximity from the capital city of Calcutta. So the authorities concerned thought of setting up a Police Training College at a better site having a bigger area. In July 1912, the college was established at Sardah to meet police training requirements in Bengal and Assam, which later in 1962 was declared as Police Academy, by the then president Field Marshal Ayub Khan who was visiting the academy as Chief Guest in its Golden Jubily. In 2007, it was renamed as Bangladesh Police Academy.

== Historical background ==
Major H. Chamney who was selected to be the first principal of the reorganized Bengal Police Training College was an army officer, serving at Ghazipur (India) at that time. In those days, there was a regular passenger steamer service between Ghazipur and Calcutta run by Indian Navigation and Railway Company. Legends say that while traveling to Calcutta by this river route, Major Chamney once stopped at Charghat-which was then a steamer station-and was fascinated by the beauty of Sardah with a large open field and massive buildings of Dutch and English indigo planters. These were then being used as the Katcheries of the Midnapur Zaminderi Estate. Major H. Chamney thought this place suitable for establishment of a Police Training College. He immediately reported the matter to the Govt. and his proposal was accepted. The entire property, comprising an area of 242.66 acres of land with all its installations, was then purchased by the Government from Midnapur Zamindari Estate at an amount of only Tk. 25,000. It was thus destined to become the site for the planned Police Training College.

== Courses offered ==
=== Basic courses ===
Sl. No	Courses Offered to	Duration
1	ASP (Probationary)	12 months
2	Outside Cadet Sub Inspector	12 months
3	Departmental Cadet Sub Inspector	12 months
4	Sergeant	12 months
5	Recruit Constable	06 months

=== Refreshers’ courses ===
Sl. No	Courses Offered to	Duration
1	Junior Staff Course (Departmental promotee ASP)	04 weeks
2	Preliminary Staff Course (Inspector Unarmed)	06 weeks in Noakhali PTC
3	Preliminary Staff Course (Inspector Armed)	06 weeks
4	SI (Unarmed)	08 weeks
5	SI (Armed)	08 weeks
5	Sergeant/TSI	08 weeks
6	ASI (Unarmed)	08 weeks
7	ATSI	08 weeks
8	ASI (Armed)	08 weeks

=== Specialized courses ===
Sl. No	Courses Offered to	Duration
1	Training of Trainers’ Course	24 days
2	Section Leaders’ Course (ASI – Armed)	04 months
3	Course of Reproductive Health and Gender Issue	15 days
4	NSI & Railway Security Course (sent by the Ministry of Home Affairs)	06 months

== List of principals ==
1. Major H. Chamney (1912-1919)
2. J. Mackenzie, IP (1919-1921)
3. A. D Gordon, IP. (1921-1924)
4. G. H. Mannooch, IP. (1924-1928)
5. G. C. Sturgis, IP. (1928-1932)
6. C. Weale, IP. (1932-1934)
7. W. G. Thrupp, IP. (1934-1935)
8. S. G. Taylor, IP. (1935-1939)
9. E. H. Le-Brocq, IP (1939-1943)
10. T. G. Holman, IP (1943-1947)
11. P. L. Mehta, IP (April 1947 - August 1947)
12. M. A. Khan, P.S.P. (1947-1951)
13. Y. A. Sayeed, P.S.P. (1952-1953)
14. RG. Mellor, P.S.P. (1953-1955)
15. A. M. A. Kabir, P.S.P. (April 1955 - Dec 1955)
16. F. R Khundkar, P.S.P (1955-1956)
17. J. R Chitham, P.S.P (1956-1957)
18. Mohd. Idris, P.S.P. (1957-1960)
19. A. M. Sadullah, P.S.P. (1960-1961)
20. K. N. Hossain, P.S.P. (1962-1967)
21. A. K. M. H. Rahman, P.S.P. (1967-1970)
22. Abdul Khaleque, P.S.P. (1970-1971)
23. A. Rahim, P.S.P. (30 Aug 1971 - 17 Oct 1971)
24. A. B. M. G. Kibria, P.S.P. (06 Oct 1972 - 07 Jul 1973)
25. S. K. Chowdhury, P.S.P. (05 Aug 1973 - 12 Aug 1974)
26. A. K. M. Serajul Haque (12 Aug 1974 - 28 Feb 1976)
27. M. M. Shareef Ali (28 Feb 1976 - 13 Dec 1978)
28. S. Zakir Husain (12 July 1979 - 08 Feb 1981)
29. M. R. Farouk (08 Feb 1981 - 07 Feb 1983)
30. A. F. Kabir (07 Feb 1983 - 08 Apr 1985)
31. M. Enamul Huq (16 Apr 1985 - 19 Apr 1986)
32. M. Shahidul Islam Chy (19 Apr 1986 - 02 Jul 1987)
33. Shahudul Haque (02 Jul 1987 - 10 Dec 1989)
34. M. Azizul Huq (04 Jan 1990 - 11 Oct 1990)
35. Mir Hashmat Ullah, P.S.C. (14 Oct 1990 - 27 Mar 1991)
36. Md. Abdus Salam (28 Mar 1991 - 15 Dec 1991)
37. A. F. M. Mahmud AI-Farid (29 Dec 1991 - 28 Nov 1994)
38. Osman Ali Khan, B.P.M. (28 Nov 1994 - 07 Mar 1996)
39. A. F. M. Mahmud AI-Farid (16 Mar 1996 - 08 Apr 1996)
40. Mohammad Salam (08 Apr 1996 - 23 Apr 1996)
41. A. F. M. Mahmud AI-Farid 11.05.1996-10.09.1996
42. Ashraful Huda (10 Sep 1996 - 03 Jun 1997)
43. Mudabbir Hossain Chowdhury, P.S.C. 03.06.1997-21.04.1999
44. P. R Barua 25.04.1999-04.06.2000
45. Md. Matiur Rahman, B. P. M. 20.08.2001-12.11.2001
46. M. Anwar Hossain 10.12.2001-29.09.2002
47. Md. Sadat Hossain 09.10.2002-27.05.2003
48. Abdul Kaium (27 May 2003 - 02 Apr 2004)
49. Md. Anisur Rahman 17.04.2004-10.07.2004
50. Chy. Qamrul Ahsan 10.07.2004-29.12.2005
51. Hassan Mahmood Khandker, NDC 24.01.2006-22.10.2006
52. Mohd. Nazibur Rahman 01.11.2006-30.11.2006
53. Md. Mukhlesur Rahman 02.12.2006-20.05.2008
54. SM Sazzat Ali, PPM 29.05.2008-24.01.2009
55. Md. Mukhlesur Rahman 14.10.2009-25.11-2009
56. Abdus Salam, PPM 26.11.2009-20.10.2010
57. Muhammad Aminul lslam 20.10.2010-31.01.2012
58. Naim Ahmed, BPM 31.01.2012-17.12.2015
59. Nazibur Rahman ndc, PhD 18.12.2015-19.11.2020
60. Khandker Golam Faruq, BPM (bar), PPM 19.11.2020-14.02.2022
61. Abu Hasan Muhammad Tarique, BPM 14.02.2022-24.02.2023
62. Mir Rezaul Alam, BPM (bar) 06.03.2023-04.04.2024
63. Md. Masudur Rahman Bhuiyan, BPM 04-04-2024-13.03.2025
64. Barrister M.Zillur Rahman (In-Charge), 13.03.2025-01.09.2025
65. Md. Tawfique Mahbub Chowdhury, BPM 01.09.2025-19.03.2026
66. G M Azizur Rahman 19.03.2026-Present

== See also ==
- Sardah chhota kuthi
