= Inspector General of Police (Bangladesh) =

Head of the Bangladesh Police

Inspector General of Bangladesh Police
- বাংলাদেশ পুলিশের মহাপরিদর্শক (Bengali)
- Shoulder insignia of IGP Star Plate

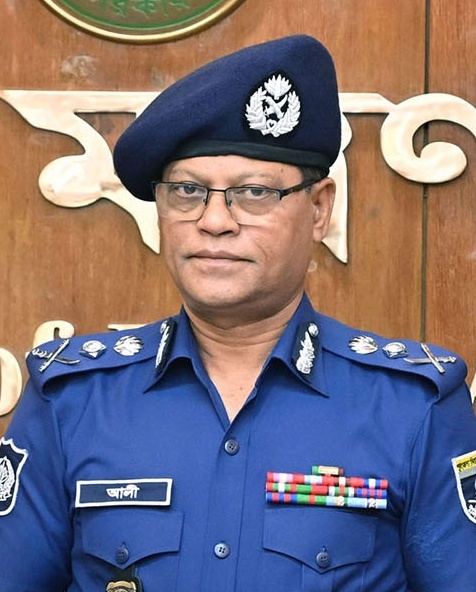
- Incumbent; IGP Md. Ali Hossain Fakir since 24 February 2026
- Bangladesh Police
- Abbreviation: IGP
- Member of: National Committee on Security Affairs
- Reports to: Prime Minister; Ministry of Home Affairs
- Residence: Police Bhaban IGP Residence, Dhaka
- Seat: 6, Phoenix Road, Fulbaria, Dhaka
- Appointer: Prime Minister; on the advice of the Minister of Home Affairs
- Term length: 4 years / Years left before reaching Govt. Service age limit (59 years)
- Constituting instrument: The Police Act, 1861
- Inaugural holder: IGP Abdul Khaleque
- Formation: 16 December 1971; 54 years ago
- Succession: 13th (on the Order of precedence in Bangladesh)
- Deputy: Additional Inspector General of Police
- Website: www.police.gov.bd

The Inspector General of Police (IGP) (Bengali: পুলিশের মহাপরিদর্শক, romanized: Pulisher Mohāporidôrśok) is the highest-ranking officer and professional head of the Bangladesh Police. The IGP is responsible for the overall command, administration, and operational effectiveness of the national police force, overseeing law enforcement, public order, and internal security across the country.

The office is held by a senior officer of the Bangladesh Police and is appointed by the government of Bangladesh under the supervision of the Ministry of Home Affairs.

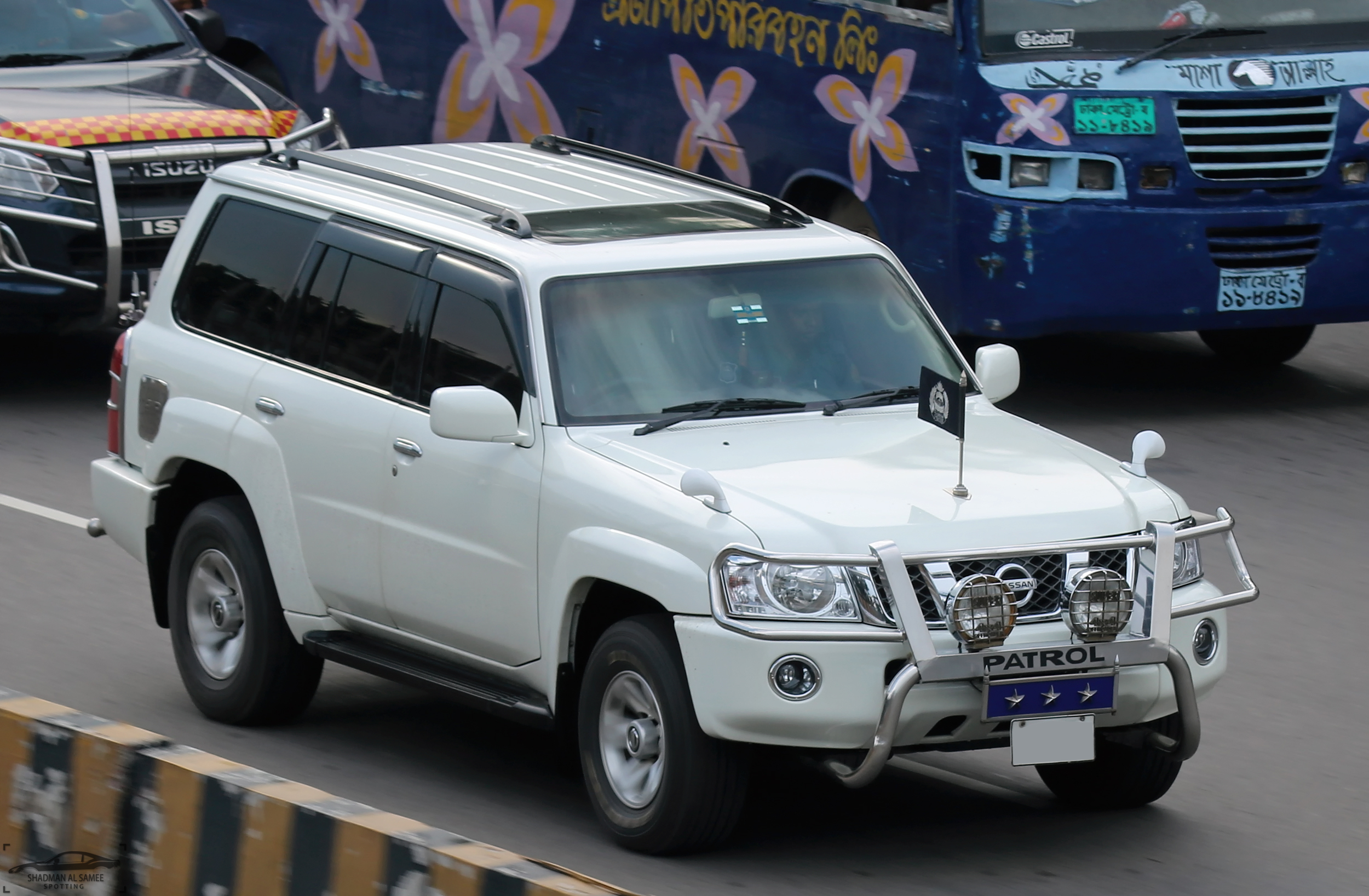
Vehicle used by IGP

== List of IGPs ==
This is a list of IGPs since the partition of India in 1947. The partition created East Pakistan, which became Bangladesh in 1971.

Portrait	Name	Took office	Left office	Time in office	Ref.
East Pakistan (1947–1971)
	Zakir Husain	15 August 1947	19 October 1952	5 years, 65 days	(Note: The police say Zakir Husain took office on 15-5-47, but that is likely a typo in the source. All text descriptions say he became IGP after partition, which was 15-8-47.)
	A. H. M. Shamsud Doha	20 November 1952	26 September 1956	3 years, 311 days	
	S. A. H. M. Ismail	27 September 1956	11 October 1958	2 years, 14 days	
	K. A. Haque	12 October 1958	31 October 1958	19 days	
	AKM Hafizuddin	11 November 1958	25 February 1962	3 years, 106 days	
	A. M. A. Kobir	26 February 1962	28 February 1967	5 years, 2 days	
	A. S. M. Ahmed	1 March 1967	24 March 1969	2 years, 23 days	
	Mohiuddin Ahmed	25 March 1969	21 January 1970	302 days	
	Taslim Ahmed	22 January 1970	17 May 1971	1 year, 115 days	
	M. A. K. Chowdhury	18 May 1971	13 December 1971	209 days	
People's Republic of Bangladesh (1971–present)
	Abdul Khaleque	17 April 1971	23 April 1973	2 years, 6 days	(Note: Kachua and UNB say Abdul Khaleque took office on 17 April 1971, under the provisional government of Bangladesh. The police say he took office on 16 December 1971, the day Bangladesh won its war of independence.)
	A Rahim	23 April 1973	31 December 1973	252 days	
	A H Norul Islam	31 December 1973	21 November 1975	1 year, 325 days	
	Hossain Ahmed	21 November 1975	26 August 1978	2 years, 278 days	
	A. B. M. G. Kibria	26 August 1978	7 February 1982	3 years, 165 days	
	M M R Khan	8 February 1982	31 January 1984	1 year, 357 days	
	E. A. Chowdhury	1 February 1984	30 December 1985	1 year, 332 days	
	Md. Habibur Rahman	1 January 1986	9 January 1986	8 days	
	Abdur Raquib Khandaker	9 January 1986	28 February 1990	4 years, 50 days	(Note: The police do not acknowledge the tenure of Md. Habibur Rahman. They say Abdur Raquib Khandaker took office on 31 December 1985. Kachua and UNB say he took office on 9 January 1986.)
	Taibuddin Ahmed	28 February 1990	8 January 1991	310 days	(Note: The police say Taibuddin Ahmed left office on 4 January 1991. Kachua and UNB say he left office on 8 January 1991. Kachua says he served a second term from 20 July 1991 to 16 October 1991, a period when the police do not show anyone in office and UNB says Enamul Huq was in office.)
	A M Chowdhury	8 January 1991	20 July 1991	193 days	
	Taibuddin Ahmed	20 July 1991	16 October 1991	80 days	(Note: Kachua says Taibuddin Ahmed served a second term from 20 July 1991 to 16 October 1991, a period when the police do not show anyone in office and UNB says Enamul Huq was in office. Other sources confirm he served two terms, without specifying when.)
	Enamul Huq	16 October 1991	8 July 1992	266 days	(Note: The police and Kachua say Enamul Huq was in office from 16 October 1991 to 8 July 1992. UNB says he was in office from 20 July 1991 to 16 October 1991, a period when Kachua says Taibuddin Ahmed served a second term and the police do not show anyone in office.)
	A. S. M. Shahjahan	8 July 1992	22 April 1996	3 years, 289 days	(Note: Kachua and UNB say A. S. M. Shahjahan took office on 8 July 1992. The police say he took office on 9 July 1992.)
	M. Azizul Haq	22 April 1996	16 November 1997	1 year, 208 days	(Note: The police say M. Azizul Haq took office on 22 April 1996. Kachua and UNB say he took office on 22 July 1996.)
	Md Ismail Hossain	16 November 1997	27 September 1998	315 days	
	A. Y. B. I. Siddiqi	27 September 1998	7 June 2000	1 year, 254 days	
	Muhammed Nurul Huda	7 June 2000	6 November 2001	1 year, 152 days	
	Mudabbir Hossain Chowdhury	6 November 2001	22 April 2003	1 year, 167 days	(Note: The police say Mudabbir Hossain Chowdhury took office on 6 November 2001. Kachua and UNB say he took office on 16 November 2001.)
	Shahudul Haque	22 April 2003	15 December 2004	1 year, 237 days	
	Ashraful Huda	15 December 2004	7 April 2005	113 days	
	Mohammad Hadis Uddin	7 April 2005	7 May 2005	30 days	
	Abdul Kaium	7 May 2005	6 July 2006	1 year, 60 days	
	Anwarul Iqbal	6 July 2006	2 November 2006	119 days	
	Khoda Baksh Chowdhury	2 November 2006	29 January 2007	88 days	
	Nur Mohammad	29 January 2007	31 August 2010	3 years, 214 days	
	Hassan Mahmood Khandker	31 August 2010	31 December 2014	4 years, 122 days	
	A. K. M. Shahidul Haque	31 December 2014	31 January 2018	3 years, 31 days	(Note: The police say A. K. M. Shahidul Haque took office on 31 December 2014. Kachua and UNB say he took office on 1 January 2015.)
	Mohammad Javed Patwary	31 January 2018	15 April 2020	2 years, 75 days	
	Benazir Ahmed	15 April 2020	30 September 2022	2 years, 168 days	
	Chowdhury Abdullah Al-Mamun	30 September 2022	5 August 2024	1 year, 310 days	
	Md. Mainul Islam	7 August 2024	21 November 2024	105 days	
	Baharul Alam	21 November 2024	25 February 2026	1 year, 96 days	
	Md. Ali Hossain Fakir	24 February 2026		267 days	

== Timeline ==
=== Footnotes ===
The table is based mainly on three sources: an article published by United News of Bangladesh (UNB), the official website of the Bangladesh Police (police), and the website of Kachua Upazila, Chandpur (Kachua), also published by the government.
