= Enamul Huq =

Bangladeshi police officer (1938–2026)

- এনামুল হক
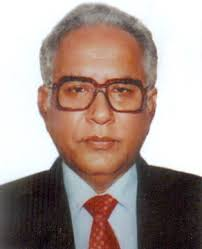
- Huq in 2012

Inspector General of Police of Bangladesh Police
- In office 16 October 1991 – 8 July 1992
- Preceded by: Toyob Uddin Ahmed
- Succeeded by: A. S. M. Shahjahan

Personal details
- Born: 2 January 1938 Godagari, Rajshahi, Bengal Province, British India
- Died: 30 August 2026 (aged 88)
- Education: University of Rajshahi; University of Dhaka; University of New Orleans

Enamul Huq (Bengali: এনামুল হক; 2 January 1938 – 30 August 2026) was a Bangladeshi police officer who served as the inspector general of police, and a member of the Law Commission from 2004 to 2007.

== Education and career ==
Huq obtained his bachelor's and master's in history from the University of Rajshahi and LLB from the University of Dhaka. He earned his Ph.D. in public administration from the University of New Orleans.

He joined the police cadre in 1964 and trained at the Police Academy Sardah and the International Police Academy Washington D.C. Huq was appointed the principal of the Bangladesh Police Academy and served as the commissioner of the Dhaka Metropolitan Police. He was appointed inspector general of police, the top position in the Bangladesh Police, in 1991. He was senior adviser to JICA.

== Personal life and death ==
Huq was married to Anamika Hoque Lilly, an educationist and writer. They had one daughter, Aditi Titas Huq and two sons, Ashim Shatil Haque and Barrister Aneek R. Haque. His elder brother Barrister Aminul Haque was minister of telecommunication during Khaleda's ministry.

Huq died on 30 August 2026, at the age of 88.
