= New Biplobi Communist Party =

Militant Maoist group in Bangladesh

New Revolutionary Communist Party
- নতুন বিপ্লবী কমিউনিস্ট পার্টি
- Other name: New BCP
- Founded: c. 2006; 20 years ago
- Dates active: 2006‐2019
- Split from: BCP
- Country: Bangladesh
- Ideology: Maoism
- Political position: Far-left
- Status: Inactive
- Wars: Maoist insurgency in Bangladesh

The New Biplobi Communist Party (Bengali: নতুন বিপ্লবী কমিউনিস্ট পার্টি, lit. 'New Revolutionary Communist Party') is a Bangladeshi far-left militant Maoist orginisation. It is a splinter of the Biplobi Communist Party.

== History ==
Dipankar Sarker of the New Biplobi Communist Party was killed in a gunfight with Bangladesh Police on 27 January 2006 in Khulna District.

Bikash Kumar Bose of the New Biplobi Communist Party was killed in a shootout with police in Kushtia District on 14 February 2009.

Both parties were active in Jhenaidah District in 2008. Imran Kabir, second in command of New Biplobi Communist Party, filed a petition for withdrawal of criminal cases against him with the Deputy Commissioner on 3 May 2009. Chief of the New Biplobi Communist Party, Akdil Hossain, was killed in a shootout with Bangladesh Police on 1 February 2010. Pratap Biswas and Shailen Biswas commanders of New Biplobi Communist Party were detained from Bagerhat District on 5 January 2010. Abdul Aziz, and Dipu Kumar Biswas of New Biplobi Communist Party were killed in a shootout with a different fraction of the party on 4 August 2010.

Shailendra Nath Biswas Shailan of New Biplobi Communist Party was killed in a shootout with Rapid Action Battalion on 4 November 2012 in Khulna. The death body of Akram Ali alias Bhadu Dakat of New Biplobi Communist Party in Khustia on 21 December 2014 with bullet wounds.

About 700 left-wing insurgents from New Biplobi Communist Party, Purbo Banglar Communist Party, and Purbo Banglar Sorbohara Party surrendered to Bangladesh Police in Pabna District on 2 April 2019.
