= Sardah chhota kuthi =

Sardah Chhota Kuthi is one of two historic "kuthis" (houses) on the campus of the Bangladesh Police Academy in Sardah, Rajshahi district, Bangladesh. The officer's mess is housed in the second kuthi, Baro-Kuthi. The principal's residence is located in Chhota-Kuthi.

== History ==
Sardah Chhota Kuthi was built in 1781 by the Dutch East India Company for their indigo factories. The British East India Company acquired it in 1835, when it became the "Sadar", or "principal headquarters", of 152 indigo Kuthis in Rajshahi region. This is where the name 'Sardah' derived. The stables were originally the sites of the indigo factory which later became a silk factory. Later the whole establishment came under the Midnapur Zamindar and was used as a "Kutchery".

== Architectural description ==
The Sardah Chhota Kuthi is a single-story building with nine apartments. It has about 31 m frontage overlooking the river and is about 15.5 m wide. The central block is higher than the front verandah and is provided with a clerestory window. The 4.5-m-wide front verandah, carried on eight pairs of Doric columns and the corners being supported on sets of four, is approached up a broad central staircase. The building is considered to look simple but attractive.
