= Abdur Raquib Khandaker =

Former inspector general of Bangladesh Police

- আব্দুর রকিব খন্দকার
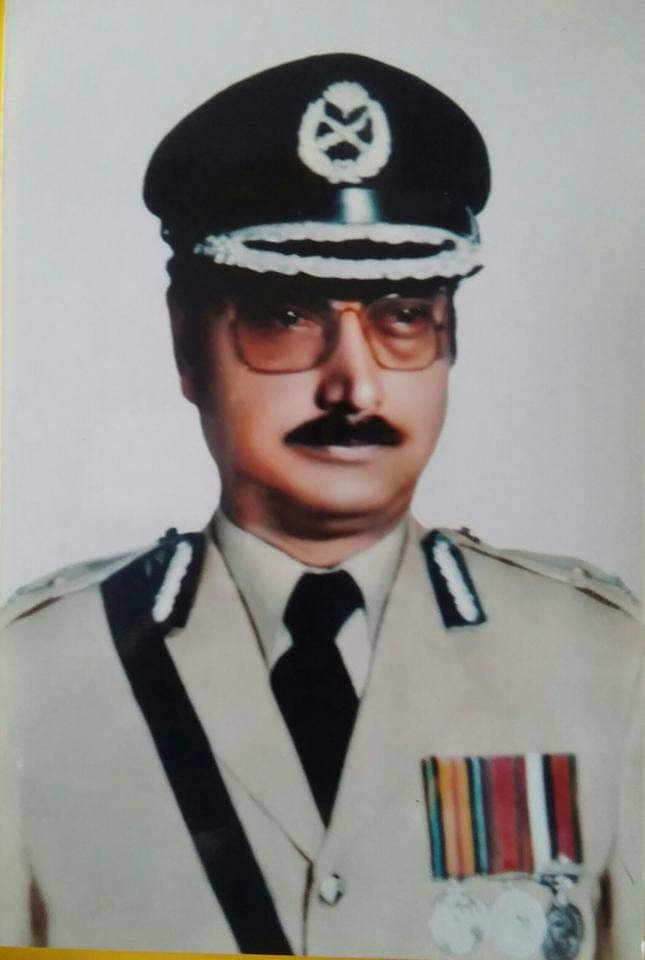

Inspector General of Bangladesh Police
- In office 31 December 1985 – 28 February 1990
- Preceded by: E A Chowdhury
- Succeeded by: Taibuddin Ahmed

President of Bangladesh Football Federation
- In office 12 October 1980 – 6 March 1986
- Preceded by: Siddique Ahmed
- Succeeded by: Harun Ahmed Chowdhury

Personal details
- Born: 1 March 1933 Munshiganj, Bengal Presidency, British India
- Died: 25 August 2010 (aged 77) Bangkok, Thailand
- Education: University of Dhaka
- Police career
- Allegiance: Bangladesh
- Branch: Bangladesh Police
- Service years: 1956–1990

Abdur Raquib Khandaker (known as A. R. Khandaker; 1 March 1933 – 25 August 2010) was Bangladesh's inspector general of police.

== Early life ==
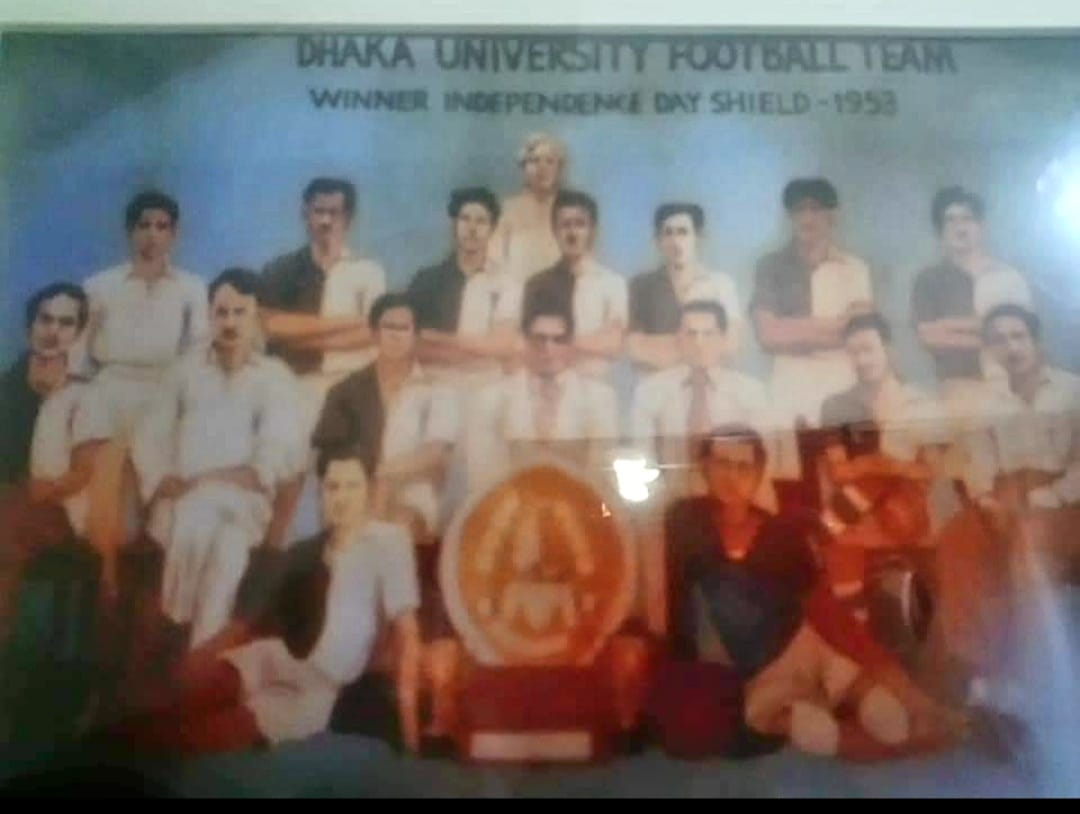
University of Dhaka, winners of the Independence Day Football Tournament in 1953 (Khandaker, first one from the left)

Khandaker graduated from Notre Dame College, Dhaka. He studied economics at the University of Dhaka.

== Career ==
=== Before liberation ===
Khandaker joined Notre Dame College, Dhaka, as a lecturer. He joined the Police Service of Pakistan in 1956.

=== After liberation ===
Khandaker served as the Superintendent of Police in Khulna District in 1971 before the Bangladesh Liberation War. In 1974, Khandaker sustained an injury from an accident while on duty, which affected him for the rest of his life.

From 1976 to 1986, Khandaker served as the president of the Bangladesh Football Federation.

In 1976, he was the deputy inspector general of police stationed in the police headquarters in Dhaka. He also served as the deputy inspector general of the Rajshahi Police range.

Khandaker was appointed the third commissioner of the Dhaka Metropolitan Police. He served from 2 February 1979 to 8 February 1982. Later he was appointed the commissioner of the Dhaka Metropolitan Police for a second term from 10 March 1983 to 4 April 1984.

Khandaker was elected to the United Nations Economic and Social Council in 1984. He served in the Crime Prevention and Control Committee of the United Nations.

Khandaker served as the inspector general of the Bangladesh Police from 31 December 1985 to 28 February 1990. He served under military dictator Hussain Mohammad Ershad.

In 1999, Khandaker was awarded the National Sports Awards as a sports organizer. He wrote a memoir, Society Politics & Civil Order, published in 1998. He wrote about experiences as a Bengali officer in the Pakistan establishment and later working in independent Bangladesh. He also wrote for The Daily Star as a columnist.

== Death ==
Khandaker died on 25 August 2010 at Bangkok General Hospital in Thailand.
