= E. A. Chowdhury =

Former Inspector General of Bangladesh Police

Inspector General of Bangladesh Police
- In office 1 February 1984 – 30 December 1985
- Preceded by: A. M. R. Khan
- Succeeded by: A. R. Khandokar

1st Commissioner of Dhaka Metropolitan Police
- In office 1 February 1976 – 24 December 1976
- Succeeded by: A.M.M Aminur Rahman

Personal details
- Born: 31 December 1928 Daudpur, Dakshin Surma Upazila, Sylhet District
- Died: 28 January 2009 (aged 80)
- Education: University of Dhaka

E. A. Chowdhury (31 December 1928 – 28 January 2009) was the inspector general of police in Bangladesh. Chowdhury was the founding commissioner of the Dhaka Metropolitan Police.

== Early life ==
Chowdhury was born on 31 December 1928 in Daudpur village, Dakshin Surma Upazila, Sylhet District as Emaduddin Ahmed Chowdhury Al-Qureshi (ইমাদউদ্দীন আহমদ চৌধুরী আল-কুরেশী), short form E. A. Chowdhury.

Chowdhury passed from Sylhet Government Pilot High School in 1943. Later from Sylhet MC College in 1945. He completed his bachelor in history in 1948 from the Murari Chand College and master's in International relations in 1950 from the University of Dhaka.

== Career ==
After his education, Chowdhury joined Feni College as a lecturer. He joined the police department in 1954. In 1964, he was the superintendent of police in Jessore District. He served as the deputy inspector general of Chittagong Range and then the Special Branch.

Chowdhury played an important role in establishing the Dhaka Metropolitan Police in 1976 and was appointed its first commissioner.

On 1 February 1984, Chowdhury was appointed the inspector general police and served till 30 December 1985. During his term, he established extensive facilities for the police in Uttara Model Town and Mirpur Model Thana. On 26 April 1985, he laid the foundation of the Jaintapur Police Station. After retirement, he served as the chairman of Pubali Bank and president of the Jalalabad Association.

== Death ==
Chowdhury died on 28 January 2009.
