= Taslim Ahmed =

Taslim Ahmed was the inspector general of police of East Pakistan and the first home secretary of Bangladesh under President Sheikh Mujibur Rahman.

== Career ==
Ahmed was the appointed inspector general of police of East Pakistan on 22 January 1970. He expressed support for Sheikh Mujibur Rahman after Mujib won the 1970 Pakistani general election. He supported the Bengali people during the Non-cooperation movement (1971). He served till 17 May 1971. He was on a grey list and transferred to West Pakistan.

Ahmed was appointed Secretary of the Ministry of Home Affairs after the Independence of Bangladesh in 1971. His appointment was controversial as he allegedly supported Pakistan during the Bangladesh Liberation War.

== Death ==
Ahmed died on 29 February 2012 in Ottawa, Canada.
