= Abdul Khaleque =

Bangladeshi politician

- আবদুল খালেক

Inspector General of Police of Bangladesh Police
- In office 17 April 1971 – 23 April 1973
- Preceded by: Position established
- Succeeded by: A. Rahim

Personal details
- Born: 1 March 1927 Comilla, Bengal Presidency, British India
- Died: 10 June 2013 (aged 86) Dhaka, Bangladesh
- Police career
- Allegiance: Bangladesh
- Branch: Bangladesh Police
- Service years: 1951-1973
- Status: Retired
- Rank: IGP

Abdul Khaleque (1 March 1927 – 10 June 2013) was the inspector general of Bangladesh police from 17 April 1971 to 23 April 1973. He was the first home secretary of Bangladesh. Prior to that, he served as the principal of the Police Academy, Sardah (now Bangladesh Police Academy), and deputy inspector general of police of Dhaka and Rajshahi ranges.

== Early life and education ==
Khaleque was born in a village named Jiruin under Brahmanpara Upazila of Comilla District on 1 March 1927. He completed his secondary education at Gangamandal Raj Institution and higher secondary education from Comilla Victoria Government College. He obtained his Bachelor of Arts (Honours) degree in economics from the University of Dhaka. In 1950, he obtained his master's degree in economics from the same university. He also obtained a bachelor's degree in law from the same university.

== Career ==
Khaleque taught at the University of Dhaka and Jagannath University before joining the Police Service of Pakistan (PSP). He joined the police service after successfully completing the Superior Service Examination in 1951. He was trained at the Police Academy, Sardah, (now Bangladesh Police Academy). During his early days, he served as the sub-divisional police officer of Gopalganj and Narayanganj. Later he served as the additional superintendent of police in Barisal. On 8 February 1958, he was made the superintendent of police of Pabna. He served there till 27 January 1959. Later, he served as the SP of Rajshahi from 31 January 1959 to 19 October 1959. He also served as the superintendent of police of Chittagong and Mymensingh. He served in the Central Intelligence and Anticorruption department. After being promoted to deputy inspector general, he served as the Rajshahi range DIG from 3 October 1966 to 14 December 1966. Later he served as the Dhaka range DIG. In 1970 he was made the principal of the Police Academy, Sardah, (now Bangladesh Police Academy). He held the position until the outbreak of the Liberation War of Bangladesh.

He was also a member of the Mukti Bahini.

Khaleque was one of the four founding members of Ain O Salish Kendro.

== Personal life ==
Khaleque was married to Selina Khaleque.

== Books ==
- Political Economy of Foreign Aid. Dacca: Polwel. 1980. OCLC 8346193.
- Peace, Police, Crime and Violence. Dhaka: Polwel. 1999. OCLC 1190946130.
- Three Decades of Foreign Aid. Abdul Khaleque. 2004. OCLC 67840338.
- Transfer of technology and leap forward (2nd ed.). Dhaka: Abdul Khaleque. 2004. OCLC 857142386.
- Sritikatha স্মৃতিকথা [Memoirs] (in Bengali).
