= A. K. M. Shahidul Haque =

Bangladeshi police officer

- এ কে এম শহীদুল হক
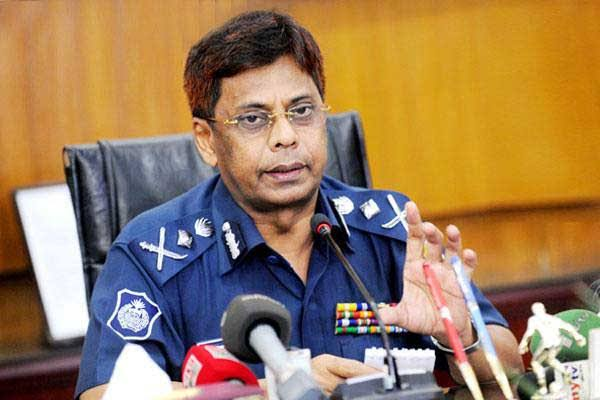

Inspector General of Bangladesh Police
- In office 1 January 2015 – 30 January 2018
- President: Abdul Hamid
- Prime Minister: Sheikh Hasina
- Preceded by: Hassan Mahmood Khandker
- Succeeded by: Mohammad Javed Patwary

31st Police Commissioner of Dhaka Metropolitan Police
- In office 18 March 2009 – 14 October 2010
- Appointed by: Minister of Home Affairs
- Preceded by: Naeem Ahmed
- Succeeded by: Benazir Ahmed

Personal details
- Born: Shariatpur District
- Police career
- Allegiance: Bangladesh
- Branch: Bangladesh Police
- Service years: 1986 - 2018
- Rank: IGP

A. K. M. Shahidul Haque is a Bangladeshi police officer who served as the inspector general of police. He is the founder of Mazid Jarina Foundation School & College.

== Career ==
Haque was born in Narkalikata, Naria, Shariatpur District, to a Bengali Muslim family. He joined the Bangladesh Police in 1986 as an assistant superintendent. He held other positions, which include police commissioner of the Dhaka Metropolitan Police, DIG Chittagong Range, DIG Rajshahi Range, DIG (finance and development) at Police Headquarters, and SP in Sirajganj, Chittagong, Moulvibazar and Chandpur. Before being promoted to IGP, he was additional IGP (administration and operations) at the status of secretary of Bangladesh Police.

Haque served in three UN peacekeeping missions, in Cambodia, Angola and Sudan, and was awarded the UN Peace Medal for his performance.

== Arrest ==
On 3 September 2024, Haque was arrested in the Uttara area of Dhaka. He is facing multiple cases, including murder cases.
