= Md Ismail Hossain =

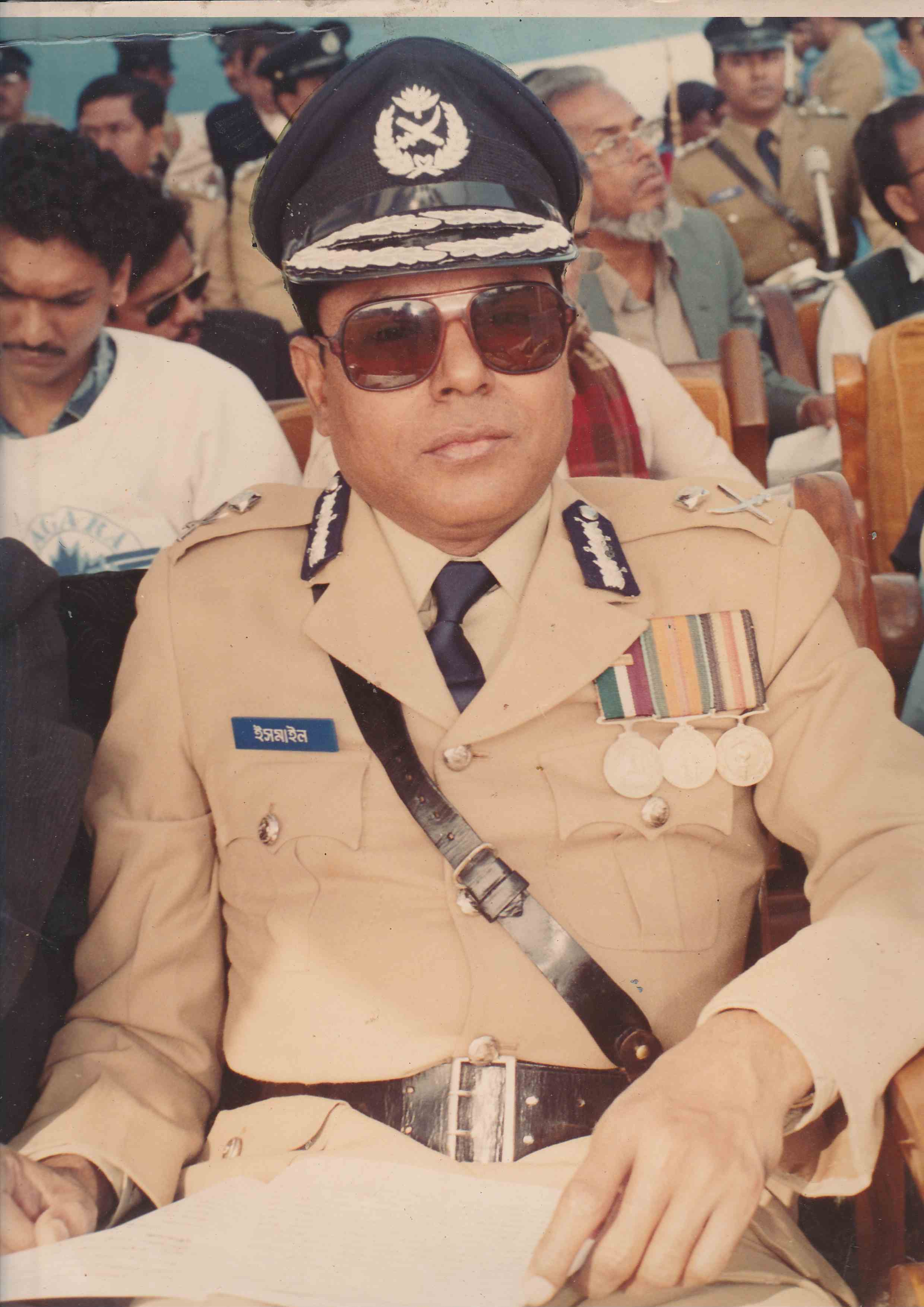
Md. Ismail Hossain during his term as Inspector General

Md. Ismail Hossain was a police officer who served as the inspector general of police of Bangladesh Police during 1997–1998. He was born at Fulbaria, a village of Sarishabari Upazila in Jamalpur District.

== Early life and education ==
Hossain grew up in the Jamalpur district in Bangladesh, where he attended Bhatura High School.

== Career ==
Hossain joined the Pakistan Police Service in 1966 as an assistant superintendent of police.

Hossain served as the inspector general of police from 16 November 1997 to 27 September 1998. He was the first IGP from the greater Mymensingh Area.

== Death ==
Hossain died on 27 October 2016 in Apollo Hospital Dhaka.
