= KM Ehsanul Haque Peyara =

Bangladeshi politician

KM Ehsanul Haque Peyara (died 2021) was the defence secretary of Bangladesh.

== Career ==
In 1969, Peyara joined the Pakistan Taxation Service.

Peyara was appointed secretary of the Ministry of Defence on 27 November 2001 replacing M. Idris Ali.

In August 2004, Mejbah Uddin Ahmed replaced Peyara as the secretary of defence after his retirement. The Parliamentary standing committee on Ministry of Defence questioned him over the court martialing of 17 Bangladesh Navy officers regarding irregularities involved in the purchase of BNS Khalid Bin Walid. He told the standing committee that he was not informed by the navy about the incident.

== Personal life ==
Peyara was married to Najma. They had two daughters, Tumpa and Tatum.

== Death ==
Peyara died on 9 May 2021 in St. Louis, United States at the age of 76.
