= A. H. M. Shamsud Doha =

Pakistani politician

A. H. M. Shamsud Doha was a Pakistani politician. He served as the Minister of Agriculture of Pakistan in the 1960s. Doha was the Inspector General of Police in East Pakistan and had a contentious relationship with future President of Bangladesh, Sheikh Mujibur Rahman.

== Career ==
Doha served in the British India police service.

In 1952, Doha was the Director General of East Pakistan Ansars. He described religious minorities fleeing East Pakistan to India as enemies.

20 November 1952 to 26 September 1956, Doha was the Inspector General of Police of East Pakistan.

In the 1960s, Doha was the Minister of Agriculture and Works of Pakistan.

== Personal life ==
Doha's son, A R Shamsud Doha, was a former Foreign Minister of Bangladesh.
