= Muhammad Nurul Huda =

Bangladeshi police officer

Inspector General of Police of Bangladesh Police
- In office 7 June 2000 – 6 November 2001
- Preceded by: A. Y. B. I. Siddiqi
- Succeeded by: Mudabbir Hossain Chowdhury

Muhammad Nurul Huda is a Bangladeshi police officer who served as the inspector general of police during 2000–2001. He is a columnist at The Daily Star. He worked as a consultant for the United Nations Development Programme.

== Career ==
Huda joined the Police Service of Pakistan in 1970. He received training from the Federal Bureau of Investigation as an East Pakistan Police officer.

In 1994, Huda was made the national law enforcement consultant for the United Nations Drug Control Programme in Dhaka. He served in that position till 1997.

From 7 June 2000 to 6 November 2001, Huda was the inspector general of police, during the caretaker government led by chief advisor Latifur Rahman.

Huda retired as the secretary of the Ministry of Youth and Sports in 2003.

Huda is a member of the advocacy group of the Bangladesh Enterprise Institute. In June 2024, he criticized the Bangladesh Police Service Association for posting a statement against journalists investigating corruption by police officers.
