= Ashraful Huda =

Bangladesh police officer

Inspector General of Police of Bangladesh Police
- In office 15 December 2004 – 7 April 2005
- Preceded by: Shahudul Haque
- Succeeded by: Mohammad Hadis Uddin

Personal details
- Children: 2

Ashraful Huda is a former officer of the Bangladesh Police who served as the inspector general of police during 2004–2005. Ashraful joined the Pakistani army as a commissioned officer in 1967 and served in the Bangladesh Army after independence.

== Career ==
Ashraf served as the principal of the Bangladesh Police Academy from 1996 to 1997.

Ashraf took charge as the commissioner of the Dhaka Metropolitan Police (DMP) on 8 April 2003 after his retirement as deputy inspector general of police. He left the position of IGP when his contract expired on 7 April 2005.

=== 2004 Dhaka grenade attack case ===
Ashraf was serving as the Dhaka Metropolitan Police commissioner at the time of the 2004 Dhaka grenade attack that killed 19 and injured over 200 others. He went abroad on the day of the attack. In July 2011, 30 people were added to the supplementary charge sheets of the grenade attack case, which included Ashraf's name. Ashraf had appealed to a Dhaka court to discharge him from the cases twice in August and November the same year, but they were rejected. In March 2012, Ashraf was charged and faced up to life-term imprisonment. He was granted bail the next month.

On 22 November 2024, the High Court concluded a hearing on the appeals and death references of the grenade attack cases. On 1 December 2024, Ashraful Huda, Tarique Rahman, Lutfozzaman Babar, and all other accused were acquitted by the court.

=== Police reform committee ===
BNP acting chairman Tarique Rahman formed a six-member committee to prepare the BNP's proposal to the interim government on the reformation of the police force. Ashraful Huda is a member of this committee, led by BNP Standing Committee member Hafiz Uddin Ahmed. On 14 November 2024, the committee submitted its proposals to the BNP chairperson's office.

== Personal life ==
Ashraf is married to Hamida Khatun. His mother-in-law, Zubaydah Khatun, belonged to the Zamindar family of Gunahar. They have a son named Shamsul Huda Romel. He was jailed by the Chief Metropolitan Magistrate (CMM) Court in Dhaka in 2015 in connection with a Yaba pills case.
