= Mohiuddin Ahmed (police officer) =

Bangladeshi police officer and government official

Mohiuddin Ahmed (died 14 April 2005) was a Bangladeshi police officer and government official who served as inspector general of police of East Pakistan, and chairman of the Bangladesh Public Service Commission. He was the secretary of the Ministry of Industries, and chairman of the East Pakistan Industrial Development Corporation. He joined the Indian Police Service in 1940 and held several senior positions during his career.

He died in Dhaka at the age of 91 on 14 April 2005.
