= Hassan Mahmood Khandker =

Bangladeshi police officer

- হাসান মাহমুদ খন্দকার

Ambassador of Bangladesh to Spain
- In office 7 October 2015 – 14 February 2021
- Preceded by: Ikhtiar Chowdhury
- Succeeded by: Mohammad Sarwar Mahmood

Inspector General of Bangladesh Police
- In office 31 August 2010 – 30 December 2014
- President: Zillur Rahman; Mohammad Abdul Hamid
- Prime Minister: Sheikh Hasina
- Preceded by: Nur Mohammad
- Succeeded by: AKM Shahidul Haque

6th Director General Rapid Action Battalion
- In office 15 February 2007 – 30 August 2010
- President: Iajuddin Ahmed; Zillur Rahman
- Prime Minister: Fakhruddin Ahmed; Sheikh Hasina
- Preceded by: Baharul Alam
- Succeeded by: Md. Mukhlesur Rahman

Personal details
- Born: Pirgachha, Rangpur
- Education: University of Dhaka
- Police career
- Allegiance: Bangladesh
- Branch: Bangladesh Police
- Service years: 1982–2014
- Status: Retired
- Rank: IGP

Hassan Mahmood Khandker is a former Bangladeshi police officer who served as the inspector general of police from 31 August 2010 to 30 December 2014. He was the longest-serving inspector general in Bangladesh Police's history. It was during his tenure that the Bangladesh Police received the Independence Day Award. Moreover, the rank badge of the IGP was upgraded to 3-star general in his time; earlier IGPs bore a two-star general rank badge since 1983. He served as an ambassador of Bangladesh to Spain during 2015–2021.

== Early life and career ==
Khandker was born in Pirgachha Upazila in Rangpur district. He completed his bachelor's and master's degrees in English from the University of Dhaka.

Khandker joined the police department in 1984 as a member of the Bangladesh Civil Service cadre of the 1982 batch. He served as director general of the Rapid Action Battalion from February 2007 to August 2010. He received the Bangladesh Police Medal and the President Police Medal. During his tenure as the IGP, the Bangladesh Police received the Independence Day Award.

Khandker was appointed the ambassador of Bangladesh to Spain in 2015.

Complaints have been brought against Khandker in the International Criminal Court (ICC) for crimes against humanity.
