= A. S. M. Shahjahan =

Bangladeshi politician (1941–2019)

- এ. এস. এম. শাহজাহান

Adviser of Ministry of Education, Science and ICT in Caretaker Government of Bangladesh
- In office 15 July 2001 – 10 October 2001
- President: Shahabuddin Ahmed
- Prime Minister: Latifur Rahman

Secretary of Ministry of Youth and Sports
- President: Shahabuddin Ahmed
- Prime Minister: Sheikh Hasina

12th Inspector General of Bangladesh Police
- In office 8 July 1992 – 22 April 1996
- President: Abdur Rahman Biswas
- Prime Minister: Khaleda Zia
- Preceded by: M. Enamul Haque
- Succeeded by: M. Azizul Haque

Personal details
- Born: 9 March 1941 Noakhali, Bengal Presidency, British India
- Died: 5 February 2019 (aged 77) Dhaka, Bangladesh

A. S. M. Shahjahan (9 March 1941 – 5 February 2019) was a Bangladeshi government police officer, civil servant and educator. He served as Adviser to non party Caretaker government of Bangladesh (2001), led by Chief Justice Latifur Rahman. he also served as the 15th Inspector General of Police of Bangladesh Police (8 July 1992 – 22 April 1996), and as the Secretary to the Ministry of Youth and Sports (1996–1999).

== Career ==
=== Adviser, Non-Party Caretaker Government of Bangladesh ===
Following the provision for caretaker government through 13th Amendment of the Constitution, the second caretaker government was formed on 15 July 2001 with former Chief Justice, Justice Latifur Rahman, as the Chief Adviser.

A.S.M. Shahjahan was sworn in as Adviser, a position equivalent to that of a Cabinet Minister of the non-party caretaker government on 15 July 2001 led by the Honorable President of Bangladesh Shahabuddin Ahmed. He was given the charge of - Ministry of Education, Primary and Mass Education Division, Ministry of Science and Technology & Ministry of Youth and Sports. He also worked as Member Advisory Council on Law and Order, Member Advisory Council on Administration for the Govt. of the People's Republic of Bangladesh.

He continued his work as senior adviser for Police Reform Program of United Nations Development Programme, a program designed to improve the efficiency and effectiveness of the Bangladesh Police in joint partnership with UNDP, Department for International Development (DFID) and the European Commission.

== Other activities ==
- President of Bangladesh Paribesh Andolon (Bapa).
- Former Vice-Chancellor, University of Asia Pacific
- Member of Transparency International Bangladesh.
