= Mudabbir Hossain Chowdhury =

Bangladeshi police officer (1947–2025)

- মোদাব্বির হোসেন চৌধুরী

Inspector General of Police of Bangladesh Police
- In office 16 November 2001 – 22 April 2003
- Preceded by: Muhammad Nurul Huda
- Succeeded by: Shahudul Haque

14th Chattogram Metropolitan Police Commissioner
- In office 14 May 1996 – 25 May 1997
- Preceded by: Osman Ali Khan
- Succeeded by: Ashraful Huda

Personal details
- Born: 1947
- Died: 1 May 2025 (aged 78) Dhaka, Bangladesh

Mudabbir Hossain Chowdhury PSC (1947 – 1 May 2025) was a Bangladeshi police officer who served as the inspector general of the Bangladesh police from 2001 to 2003. He was also the commissioner of the Chattogram Metropolitan Police in 1996 and 1997.

== Life and career ==
Chowdhury was a cadet at the Pakistan Military Academy and retired from the army as a lieutenant. After he had served as the IGP of Bangladesh, he was appointed the secretary of the culture ministry.

Chowdhury served as commissioner for the Chattogram Metropolitan Police between 14 May 1996 and 25 May 1997.

From November 2006 to January 2007, Chowdhury was the election commissioner of Bangladesh. After leaving his post he attempted to contest the parliamentary elections as a Bangladesh Nationalist Party candidate.

Chowdhury died on 1 May 2025, at the age of 78.
