= A. B. M. G. Kibria =

Bangladeshi police officer and government adviser

A. B. M. G. Kibria is a retired police officer and former adviser, with the rank of minister, of Shahabuddin Ahmed Cabinet.

== Early life ==
Kibria graduated from the University of Dhaka with Master's and Bachelor in Economics.

== Career ==
Kibria joined Police Service of Pakistan in 1952 after passing the Central Superior Services examination. He was the General Secretary of East Pakistan Sports Federation. He served as the Aide-de-Camp to the Governor of East Pakistan, Sher-e-Bangla A.K Fazlul Huq. He served as the Deputy Commissioner in Kolkata. For 18 years he served as the President of Anjuman Mufidul Islam. He became the president of Sadharan Bima Corporation in 1985. He served as an advisor to the Shahabuddin Ahmed caretaker government and was in charge of the Ministry of Communication and Telecommunication.

== Death ==
Kibria died on 28 June 2014 in United Hospital, Dhaka, Bangladesh.
