= Shahudul Haque =

Former Bangladeshi Inspector General of Police

- শাহুদুল হক

Inspector General of Police of Bangladesh Police
- In office 22 April 2003 – 14 December 2004
- Preceded by: Mudabbir Hossain Chowdhury
- Succeeded by: Ashraful Huda

Shahudul Haque is a former inspector general of police during 2003–2004. Earlier, he was an army officer who later joined the Bangladesh Police.

== Career ==
Huda served in the Pakistan Army during the Bangladesh Liberation War. He was one of 17 former army officers recruited into the Bangladesh Police by President Ziaur Rahman.

=== Dismissal ===
In August 2003, AHM Shamsuddin Chowdhury Manik, an additional judge of the High Court, issued a notice of query on the then IGP Haque while drawing contempt proceedings against five police personnel. According to Manik, a traffic policeman on duty did not salute, while his car passed in the Farmgate area in Dhaka earlier in June the same year. Haque, in his clarification letter, mentioned that "a traffic policeman on duty is not obliged to salute anybody but a discretion is left to him to pay compliment to anybody without risking traffic accident. The duty of a driver is to obey the direction of the traffic policeman and he has no right to conduct a research as to whether the direction given by the traffic policeman is right or wrong". This response triggered the High Court to put contempt charge against Haque himself. In January 2004, the High Court found Haque guilty of gross misconduct in the contempt case against the judge as well as the court and fined him Tk 2,000. Later on 8 December, he was convicted of contempt of court after the Supreme Court rejected his appeal petition against the conviction. According to the legal experts, Haque stood dismissed from service since the relevant law says, "a public servant loses job for committing offences punishable with death, transportation or imprisonment for a term exceeding six months or with fines exceeding Tk 1,000 or both." Government removed Haque from the IGP position on 14 December 2004 and put Ashraful Huda as the acting IGP. Two days later, the government appointed Huda as the new IGP and the President of Bangladesh pardoned Haque by exempting him from the purview of Section 3 of Public Servants (Dismissal on Conviction) Ordinance, 1985.

=== 2004 Dhaka grenade attack case ===
In April 2004, Haque's term for the IGP office was extended for one more year. During his term, the incident of 2004 Dhaka grenade attack occurred in August 2004 that killed 19 and injured over 200 others. In October, Haque mentioned that "no international link has been found to the recent spate of bomb blasts", a claim that contradicted the government's one-member judicial commission, which hinted at the link of a "foreign enemy" to the attack. In July 2011, 30 people were added to the supplementary charge sheets of the grenade attack case which included Haque's name. Later in December, Haque had appealed to a Dhaka court to discharge him from the cases but it was rejected. In March 2012, Haque was charged for assisting the killers financially and administratively to execute the attack and faced up to life-term imprisonment. He was granted bail the next month. In October 2018, Haque and another former IGP, Ashraful Huda, were sentenced to two years in jail and fined Tk 50,000 for harbouring the offenders.
