= Sheikh Mohammad Sarwar Hossain =

Bangladeshi politician

Sheikh Md Sarwar Hossain (born 10 January 1972) is a retired(?) major general of the Bangladesh Army who previously served as the Chairman of the Bangladesh Tea Board. He has been accused of crimes against humanity by the International Crimes Tribunal of Bangladesh and is currently in custody pending legal proceedings.

== Early life ==
Hossain was born on 10 January 1972.

== Career ==
Hossain was commissioned into the Bangladesh Army's Infantry Corps as part of the 25th Long Term Course. He graduated from the Bangladesh Military Academy on 20 December 1991.

Hossain served as a director of the Directorate General of Forces Intelligence, overseeing the Counter Terrorism and Intelligence Bureau. In October 2024, he was appointed as the Chairman of the Bangladesh Tea Board. He met the Secretary of the Ministry of Commerce, Mohang Salim Uddin, and discussed plans for the board. He was charged with crimes against humanity in October 2025 and taken into custody by the Bangladesh Army. He was one of 15 serving officers detained by the Bangladesh Army. Other former directors of the Counter Terrorism and Intelligence Bureau, Md Touhidul Ul Islam, Kabir Ahmad, Md Mahbubur Rahman Siddique, and Ahmed Tanvir Mazahar Siddiqui, were also charged with him.

== Role in enforced disappearances and Aynaghar ==
Following the fall of the Sheikh Hasina administration in August 2024, the Commission of Inquiry on Enforced Disappearances was established on 27 August 2024 to investigate state-sponsored abductions and secret detention centers also known as Aynaghar. In its findings, the commission named Sheikh Mohammad Sarwar Hossain among former military officials implicated in enforced disappearances, citing his role as Director of the Counter-Terrorism Intelligence Bureau of the Directorate General of Forces Intelligence from 2018 to 2019.

On 18 November 2024, acting on recommendations from the inquiry commission, the Security Services Division of the Ministry of Home Affairs instructed the Department of Immigration & Passports to cancel his passport to prevent travel abroad during ongoing investigations.<ref>{{cite news |title=Govt order to cancel passports of 22 officers |url=
