= Ahmed Tabrez Shams Chowdhury =

Bangladeshi military official

- Born: 30 June 1967 (age 59); Muksudpur, East Pakistan, Pakistan
- Military career
- Allegiance: Bangladesh
- Branch: Bangladesh Army
- Service years: 1987 – 2024
- Rank: Lieutenant General
- Service number: BA - 3243
- Unit: East Bengal Regiment
- Commands: Quartermaster general of Army Headquarters; GOC of ARTDOC; Director General of Directorate General of Forces Intelligence; GOC of 10th Infantry Division; GOC of 33rd Infantry Division
- Awards: Senabahini Padak (SBP); Bishishto Seba Padak (BSP); Independence Day Award

Ahmed Tabrez Shams Chowdhury (Note: SBP, BSP, ndc, psc) is a retired lieutenant general of the Bangladesh Army and served as quartermaster general (QMG) of the Bangladesh Army in Army Headquarters. Before that he was general officer commanding of Army Training and Doctrine Command. Prior to that, he was director general of the Directorate General of Forces Intelligence. He is the former general officer commanding (GOC) of the 10th Infantry Division and area commander, Cox’s Bazar Area and 33rd Infantry Division and area commander, Cumilla Area.

== Career ==
Chowdhury had served as the area commander of Cumilla Area and general officer commanding of the 33rd Infantry Division from 2018 to 2020. In October 2018, Chowdhury was the chief guest at the Bangladesh Army volleyball tournament held in Comilla Cantonment.

After Cumilla, he was appointed as the general officer commanding of the 10th Infantry Division and area commander, Cox’s Bazar Area, Ramu Cantonment. On 3 December 2020, he received General Aziz Ahmed, chief of army staff, at Ramu Cantonment, who had come to observe the flag-raising ceremony of four units at the newly established Ramu Cantonment. The four units were the Bangladesh Army Station Headquarters at Ramu, Combined Military Hospital (Ramu), 10th Field Intelligence Unit, and Static Signal Company.

On 5 July 2021, Chowdhury was appointed the director general of the Directorate General of Forces Intelligence. The former director general of the Directorate General of Forces Intelligence, Md Saiful Alam, was appointed the quarter master general of the Bangladesh Army. During his term at the DGFI, it was revealed that for a long time the DGFI has been operating a secret prison called Aynaghar.

On 26 October 2022, Chowdhury was promoted to the rank of lieutenant general, and he was posted to the Army Training and Doctrine Command (ARTDOC) in Mymensingh Cantonment. Major General Hamidul Haque succeeded him as director general of the Directorate General of Forces Intelligence.

Chowdhury was sent to mandatory retirement on 12 September 2024, along with two former director generals of the Directorate-General of Forces Intelligence, Lieutenant General Saiful Alam, and Major General Hamidul Haque. The three officers along, with former director general of special security forces Lieutenant General Mujibur Rahman, were detained soon after the fall of the Fifth Hasina ministry.

== Alleged role in Enforced Disappearances and Aynaghar ==
Following the fall of the Sheikh Hasina administration in August 2024, the Commission of Inquiry on Enforced Disappearances was established on 27 August 2024 to investigate state-sponsored abductions and secret detention centers also known as Aynaghar. In its findings, the commission named Ahmed Tabrez Shams Chowdhury among former high-ranking military officials implicated in enforced disappearances, citing human rights violations during his tenure as Director General of the Directorate General of Forces Intelligence from July 2021 to October 2022.

On 18 November 2024, acting on recommendations from the inquiry commission, the Security Services Division of the Ministry of Home Affairs directed the Department of Immigration & Passports to cancel his passport to prevent travel abroad. In July 2025, an investigative report by Netra News listed Chowdhury among senior army officers accused in enforced disappearance cases who had departed Bangladesh despite active travel bans and judicial arrest warrants.
