= Sultanuzzaman Muhammad Saleh Uddin =

Former Major General of the Bangladesh Army

- Military career
- Allegiance: Bangladesh
- Branch: Bangladesh Army; Border Guard Bangladesh
- Service years: 1986–2023
- Rank: Major General
- Service number: BA - 3136
- Unit: Corps of Engineers
- Commands: Managing Director of Bangladesh Machine Tools Factory; Commander of 34th Engineers Construction Brigade; Station Commander, Bogra; Sector Commander of BGB
- Awards: Sena Gourab Padak(SGP); Oshamanno Sheba Padak(OSP)

Sultanuzzaman Muhammad Saleh Uddin OSP, SGP, ndc is a retired major general of the Bangladesh Army who served as the managing director of Bangladesh Machine Tools Factory. He is known for overseeing the launch of smart national identity cards in Bangladesh.

== Career ==
Sultan is an officer from the 15th BMA long course. Sultan served as the director general of the NID Registration Wings of the Bangladesh Election Commission and project director of Identification system for enhancing access to service (IDEA) Project in Bangladesh Election Commission. He oversaw the issuing of smart identity cards in Bangladesh.

As the managing director of Bangladesh Machine Tools Factory, he announced plans to build ventilators at the factory during the COVID-19 pandemic in Bangladesh.

== Role in Enforced Disappearances and Aynaghar ==
Following the fall of the Sheikh Hasina administration in August 2024, the Commission of Inquiry on Enforced Disappearances was established on 27 August 2024 to investigate state-sponsored abductions and secret detention centers also known as Aynaghar. In its findings, the commission named Sultaniuzzaman Mohammad Saleh Uddin among former military officials implicated in enforced disappearances, citing his role as Colonel GS of the Counter-Terrorism Intelligence Bureau of the Directorate General of Forces Intelligence.

On 18 November 2024, acting on recommendations from the inquiry commission, the Security Services Division of the Ministry of Home Affairs instructed the Department of Immigration & Passports to cancel his passport to prevent travel abroad during ongoing investigations.
