= Md. Alep Uddin =

Bangladeshi police officer (born 1985)

- মো: আলেপ উদ্দিন

Personal details
- Born: 1 September 1985 (age 40) Kurigram, Bangladesh
- Spouse: Wafa Nusrat
- Education: Jahangirnagar University, Bangladesh Police Academy
- Awards: Bangladesh Police Medal, BPM (Bar); President Police Medal, PPM (bar)
- Police career
- Branch: Bangladesh Police
- Service years: 2013-2025
- Rank: Additional Superintendent of Police
- Badge no.: BP-8513159445

Md. Alep Uddin (Bengali: মো. আলেপ উদ্দিন; born 1 September 1985) is a Bangladeshi police officer who served as an additional superintendent of police within the Bangladesh Police and the Rapid Action Battalion prior to his suspension in January 2025. Following the 2024 July Uprising, he became a central figure in judicial inquiries and trials concerning state-sponsored abductions, extrajudicial killings, and the rape of the detainees' wives, committed during the tenure of the ousted prime minister Sheikh Hasina.

== Early life and education ==
Md. Alep Uddin was born on 1 September 1985 in Kurigram District, Bangladesh. He completed his secondary and higher secondary education locally before attending the Jahangirnagar University, where he earned both bachelor and Master of Science degrees in botany. He was affiliated with the Chhatro League, the student wing of the then-ruling Awami League, during his time at Jahangirnagar University, which he reportedly leveraged to facilitate his entry into the police service.

== Law enforcement career ==
Alep cleared the 31st Bangladesh Civil Service examination and joined the Bangladesh Police as an assistant superintendent of police on 15 January 2013. Upon completion of the trainee placement, he was posted to the Rapid Action Battalion on 14 August 2014 and assigned to RAB-11 based in Narayanganj in October that year.

Over the course of his deployment in RAB, he served in various capacities, including as an intelligence officer, media officer, and head of the unit's anti-terrorism cell. During his tenure, he received state honors, including the President Police Medal (PPM) for gallantry in counter-terrorism operations.

== Allegations of human rights abuses and crimes against humanity ==
Following the fall of the Sheikh Hasina government in August 2024, numerous complaints emerged against Md. Alep Uddin including his roles in enforced disappearances, extrajudicial killings and rape of detainees' wives.

=== Framing conservative Muslims on false terrorism charges ===
Investigators and victim testimonies established that during his tenure, particularly within the Narayanganj region while serving under RAB-11, Alep frequently targeted individuals under the guise of counter-terrorism operations. Randomly picked-up conservative Muslims were routinely rounded up and detained under falsified extremism and terrorism charges to justify arbitrary detentions.

During testimony before the Commission of Inquiry on Enforced Disappearances, a female survivor recounted her abduction and torture by state security forces in 2018. Then 25 years old, she stated that, as her hijab fell off due to being suspended from the ceiling by her hands, she heard officers, including Md. Alep Uddin, mocking her observance of modesty with the remark, "Where is the hijab now?"

=== Sexual violence and coercion ===
In February 2025, the chief prosecutor of the International Crimes Tribunal, Mohammad Tajul Islam, formally presented evidentiary findings against Alep regarding extreme sexual violence and coercion. According to the prosecution's filings, Alep exploited his authority over detainees by taking captive husbands under false terrorism charges and subsequently using threats of execution or prolonged detention to coerce and sexually assault the detainees' wives, including violations perpetrated during sensitive religious periods such as Ramadan.

=== Role in extrajudicial killings ===
The International Crimes Tribunal heard cases in relation to Md. Alep Uddin, where it was revealed that his role in numerous extrajudicial killings had earned him the title of 'Executioner' (Bengali: জল্লাদ) among the law enforcement circles.

== Arrest and legal proceedings ==
Following the July Uprising that overthrew the Hasina government on 5 August 2024, multiple murder and abduction charges were filed against law enforcement and military officials linked to the mass killing of protesters during the July movement. In November 2024, Alep was apprehended by detective branch police in Barishal over the killing of a protester, Zubayer Omar Khan, during the July Uprising in Jatrabari, Dhaka. He was subsequently placed on judicial remand.

Concurrently, his name appeared on official lists compiled by the Commission of Inquiry on Enforced Disappearances, prompting the Ministry of Home Affairs to cancel his official passport. Upon his suspension from service in January 2025, his case remains under active investigation by the International Crimes Tribunal on charges of crimes against humanity.

== See also ==
- Rapid Action Battalion
- Commission of Inquiry on Enforced Disappearances
- International Crimes Tribunal (Bangladesh)
