= Narcotics Control Act =

Narcotics Control Act may refer to:

Bangladesh

- Narcotics Control Act 1990

Brazil

- Brazilian Controlled Drugs and Substances Act

Canada

- Controlled Drugs and Substances Act
- Narcotic Control Act

Germany

- Narcotic Drugs Act

India

- Drugs Control Act, 1950
- Narcotic Drugs and Psychotropic Substances Act, 1985

United States

- Controlled Substances Act
- Foreign Narcotics Kingpin Designation Act
- Harrison Narcotics Tax Act
- Narcotic Drugs Import and Export Act
