= Kabir Ahmed =

Bangladeshi military personnel

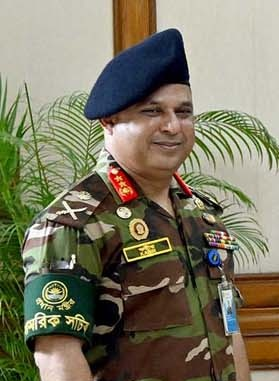
- Ahmed in 2024
- Education: Bangladesh Military Academy
- Military career
- Allegiance: Bangladesh
- Branch: Bangladesh Army
- Service years: 1991 – 2025
- Rank: Major General
- Service number: BA - 4015
- Unit: Bangladesh Infantry Regiment
- Commands: Commandant of School of Infantry and Tactics; Military Secretary to Prime Minister; Director of CTIB; Commander of 11th Infantry Brigade

Kabir Ahmed is a former two-star officer of the Bangladesh Army and former military secretary to the prime minister. As of October 2025, Kabir has been serving as ambassador under the Ministry of Foreign Affairs and has been put under investigation by the Bangladesh International Crimes Tribunal during his tenure with the Directorate General of Forces Intelligence. He was one of the officers who were called on to the International Crimes Tribunal and the only officer to remain at large.

== Career ==
Kabir was commissioned from the Bangladesh Military Academy with the 24th long course in the Infantry Corps. He served as brigade commander of the 11th Infantry Brigade at Jalalabad Cantonment. He was a brigadier general when he was appointed military secretary to the prime minister. He also served as director of the Counter Terrorism and Intelligence Bureau (CTIB) from 2019 to 2021.

== Role in enforced disappearances and Aynaghar ==
Following the fall of the Sheikh Hasina administration in August 2024, the Commission of Inquiry on Enforced Disappearances was established on 27 August 2024 to investigate state-sponsored abductions and secret detention centers also known as Aynaghar. In its findings, the commission named Kabir Ahmed among former military officials implicated in enforced disappearances, citing his role as Director of the Counter-Terrorism Intelligence Bureau of the Directorate General of Forces Intelligence from 2019 to 2021.

On 18 November 2024, acting on recommendations from the inquiry commission, the Security Services Division of the Ministry of Home Affairs instructed the Department of Immigration & Passports to cancel his passport to prevent travel abroad during ongoing investigations.

Kabir Ahmed is among the officers named in recent arrest warrants issued by the International Crimes Tribunal for alleged involvement in enforced disappearances, torture, or other crimes against humanity.

The warrants were issued on 8 October 2025. After the warrant, the Bangladesh Army issued an order on 8 October 2025 instructing officers listed to report to Dhaka Cantonment and go into custody. Kabir Ahmed did not report. He reportedly has fled to India in October 2025, within the knowledge of top-ranked Army officers.
