= Md Touhidul Ul Islam =

Md Touhidul Ul Islam is a retired major general of the Bangladesh Army and former director of the Counter Terrorism and Intelligence Bureau of the Directorate General of Forces Intelligence. He has been charged with crimes against humanity at the International Crimes Tribunal, along with 25 serving and retired Army officers, for his involvement in Enforced Disappearance under Prime Minister Sheikh Hasina.

== Early life ==
Islam did his bachelors in Computer Science and Engineering. He has a Master’s degree in Defence Studies and a Master of Business Administration. He did postgraduate studies in Information and Communication Technology at the Bangladesh University of Professionals. He graduated from the Defence Services Command and Staff College and National Defence College.

== Career ==
Islam served as a Grade II staff officer in the Armed Forces Division and as Chief Instructor at the Signal Training Centre and School. He commanded the Static Signal Company at Ghatail Cantonment and the 5th Signal Battalion at Rangpur Cantonment, and was the founding Commandant of the Army IT Support Organization (AITSO). He has also served in the Border Guard Bangladesh as Sector Commander in the Khulna Sector, and as Additional Director General (Administration). He was the Chairman of the Risk Management Committee of the Board of Shimanto Bank. He has participated in United Nations peacekeeping missions on three occasions.

After the fall of the Sheikh Hasina led Awami League government, a travel ban was imposed on Islam along with other Army and Police officers in December 2024.

In October 2025, Islam was charged at the International Crimes Tribunal, along with 25 serving and retired Army officers, for his involvement in Enforced Disappearance under Prime Minister Sheikh Hasina. The court appointed Sujad Miah, State defence lawyer, to represent Islam, major general Kabir Ahmed, and Lieutenant Colonel Mokhsurul Haque. Also accused in the case was former Prime Minister Sheikh Hasina.
