= Chandanpura Nachghar =

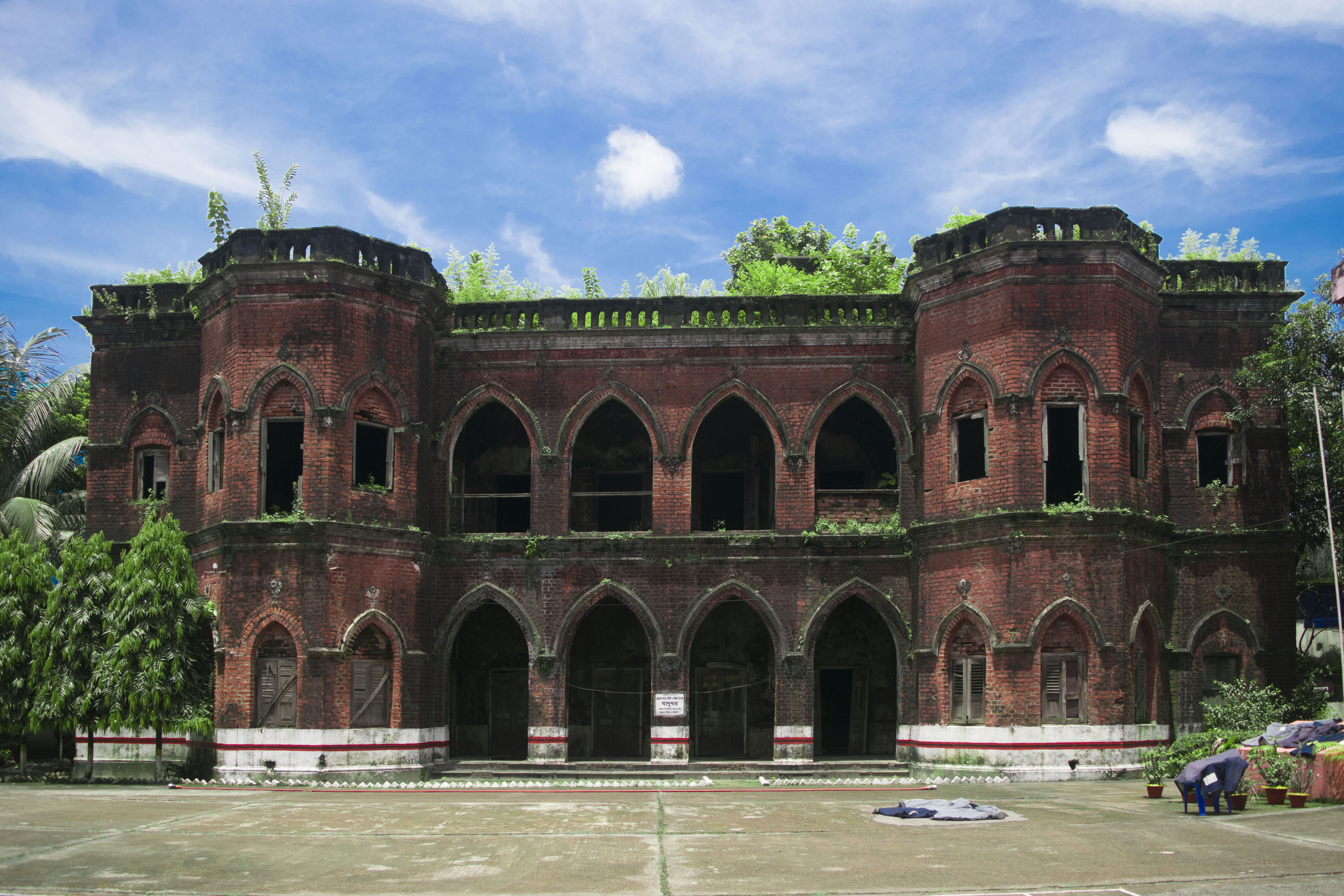
- Chandanpura Nachghar in 2017
- Interactive map of the Chandanpura Nachghar area

General information
- Location: Chandanpura Fire Service Station, Nawab Siraj-ud-Daulah Road, Chittagong
- Coordinates: 22.3498°N 91.8389°E
- Year built: 1971s
- Owner: Bangladesh Fire Service & Civil Defence

Technical details
- Material: Bricks
- Floor count: 2

Chandanpura Nachghar (lit. 'Chandanpura Dance hall') is an ancient building located adjacent to Chandanpura Fire Service Station, along Nawab Siraj-ud-Daulah road in Chittagong, Bangladesh. The dance hall of this zamindar house is located next to the fire service station. It is known as the dance hall of the zamindar house of Sajjalela. The building was once used as the Chittagong Divisional Fire Service Office. It is currently preserved as the proposed Fire Service and Civil Defense Museum. The Bangladesh government declared the building abandoned 25 years ago in the 1990s.

== History ==
The zamindar house was built about 250 years ago by the grandfather of zamindar Sajjalela in Chandanpura. After grandfather and father, Sajjalela got zamindari. After the death of Sajjalela during British rule, his entire family migrated to India. Later, the house became government property due to the acquisition of land from Hindu landlords by the government of Pakistan. Later, Sajjalela's family tried to recover the neighbouring land along with the building but failed. Chittagong Divisional Fire Service Office was established here during the Pakistan government. However, it was abandoned later when the Chittagong Divisional Fire Service Office was built in the Chaumuhani area.

== Architecture ==
The two-storied building of solid brickwork is decorated with various crafts. Various artworks on the walls include deities and flowers. There is a separate dressing room for baijee (professional dancer). The building has a total of 14 rooms including guest rooms. There is a staircase in one corner of the building to go up to the second floor, which is currently in ruins.

== Gallery ==
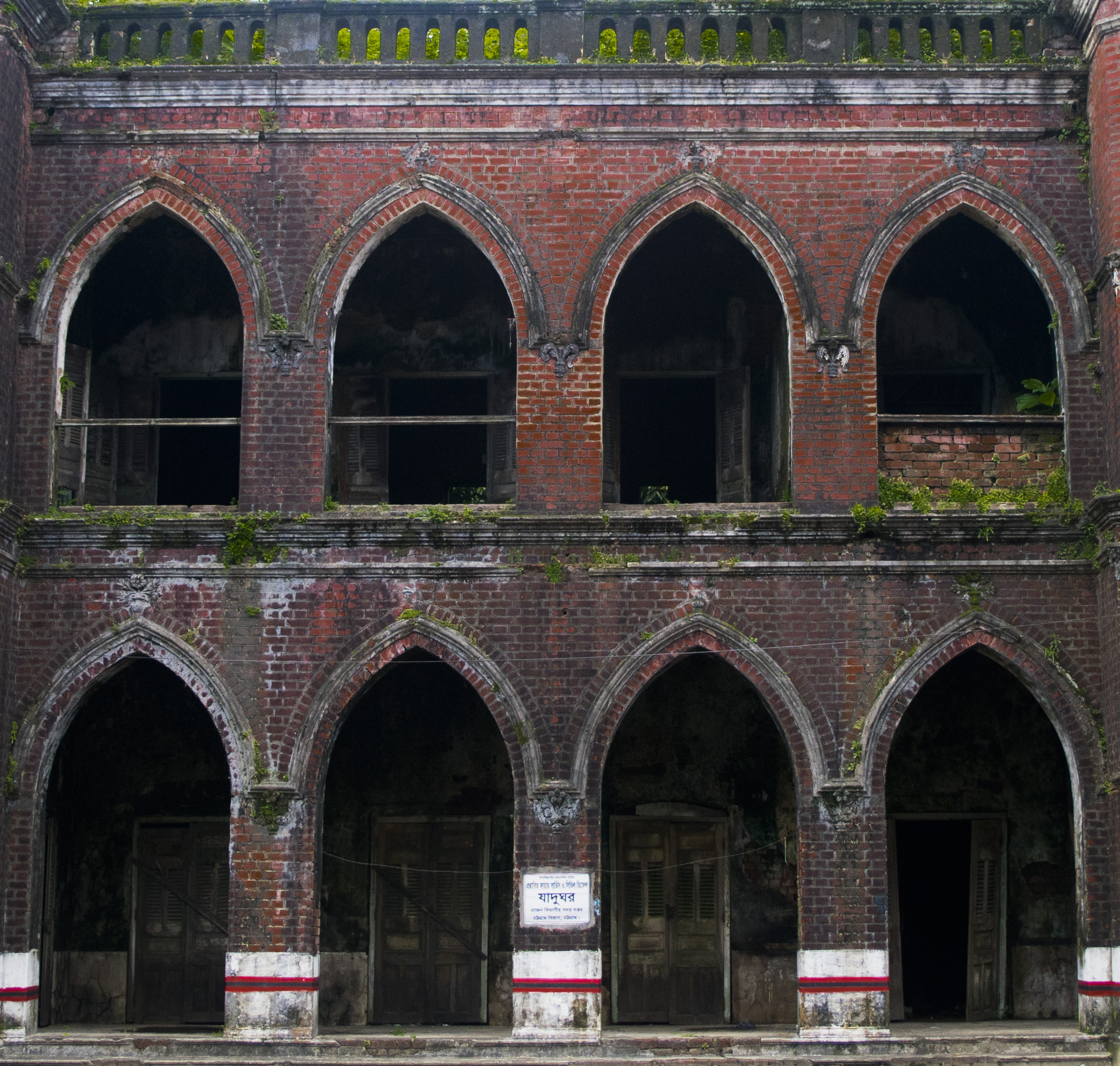

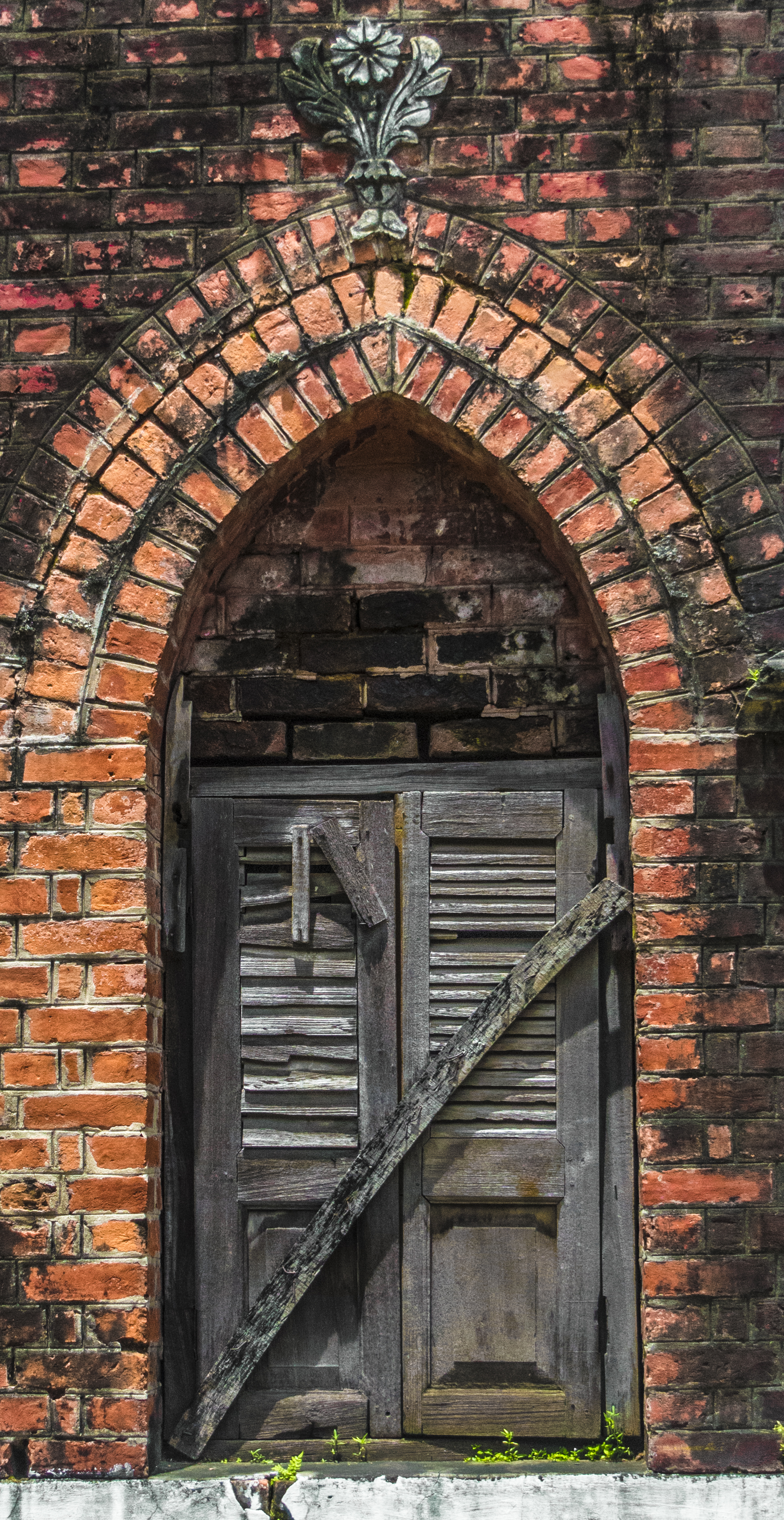

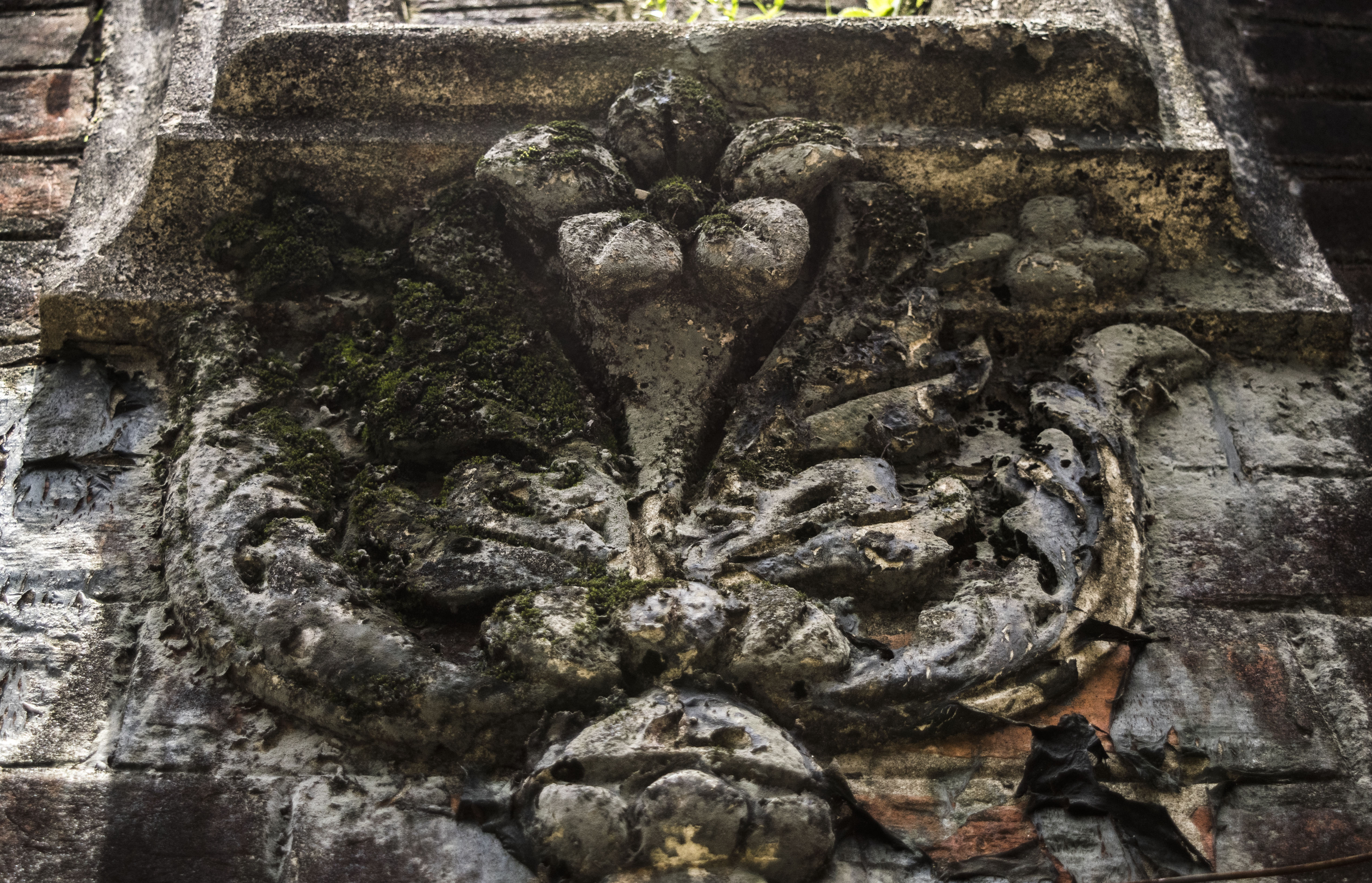

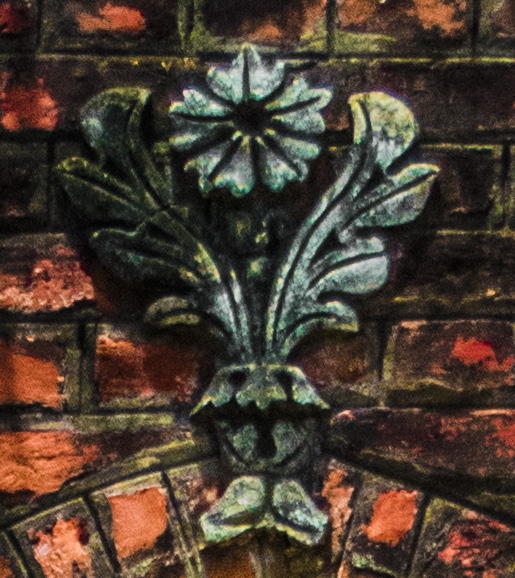
