= Narcotics Control Act 1990 =

Bangladeshi law

The Narcotics Control Act 1990 was an Act of Parliament in Bangladesh that regulated all aspects of narcotics and alcohol within the country, including production, distribution, transaction, possession, transportation and cultivation. The Act was repealed by the Narcotics Control Act of 2018.

== History ==
The Narcotics Control Act was passed in 1990 by the Parliament of Bangladesh. It replaced previous laws including the Opium Act of 1878, the Excise Act of 1909, the Dangerous Drugs Act of 1930, the Opium Smoking Act of 1932 and the Prohibition Rules of 1950. The act came into force on 2 January 1990 and brought into being the Department of Narcotics Control as the central agency responsible for its policing, reporting to the National Narcotics Control Board that is responsible for relevant policy. The Act received amendments in 2000, 2002, and 2004.
