= Khaled Al-Mamun =

Bangladesh Army officer

Khaled Al Mamun
- Military career
- Allegiance: Bangladesh
- Branch: Bangladesh Army
- Service years: 1989–2025
- Rank: Major General
- Unit: Regiment of Artillery
- Commands: GOC of 11th Infantry Division; Military Secretary at Army Headquarters; Director of Military Intelligence, Army Headquarters; Commander of 6th Independent Air Defence Artillery Brigade; Commander of 66th Artillery Brigade; Commandant of School of Military Intelligence

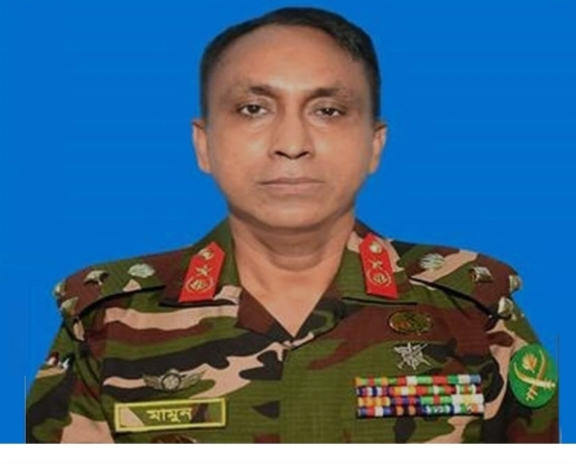
Khaled Al Mamun

Khaled Al Mamun PBGM, ndc, psc is a retired major general of the Bangladesh Army who served as the GOC of the 11th Infantry Division and area commander of the Bogra area. Prior to that, he was Military Secretary and the Director of Military Intelligence (DMI) at Army Headquarters.

== Career ==
Mamun became a major general on 24 December 2020 and took the office of the military secretary as the successor of Major General (later General) Waker-uz-Zaman. Prior to his promotion, he was the director of military intelligence (DMI) at the Army Headquarters, Dhaka. He is a director of Jolshiri Abashon, a housing scheme for army officers. He served as an SSF agent when he was a colonel under Major General Sheikh Mohammad Aman Hasan as DG SSF.
