= Security Service Division =

Unit of Ministry of Home Affairs, Bangladesh

- নিরাপত্তা সেবা বিভাগ
- Government Seal of Bangladesh

Division overview
- Formed: June 2016
- Dissolved: 2025
- Jurisdiction: Government of Bangladesh
- Headquarters: Bangladesh Secretariat, Agargaon, Dhaka
- Division executive: Senior Secretary
- Parent department: Ministry of Home Affairs
- Website: Security Service Division

Security Service Division was a division of the Ministry of Home Affairs of Bangladesh which was responsible for agencies under the ministry not involved in law enforcement.

== History ==
The government of Bangladesh decided to split the Ministry of Home Affairs into two different divisions, the Security Service Division and the Public Security Division on 1 June 2016. On 20 January 2017, the government issued the official gazette on the split of the Ministry and the formation of the two divisions. The two divisions were merged again in 2025.

== Agencies ==
- Department of Fire Service and Civil Defence
- Department of Immigration & Passport
- Department of Narcotics Control
- Department of Prison
