= Special Security Force =

Specialized Executive & VIP Protection Force

Special Security Force বিশেষ নিরাপত্তা বাহিনী
- Seal of the Special Security Force

- Insignia of the Special Security Force

- Flag of the Special Security Force
- Abbreviation: SSF
- Motto: "আল্লাহই সর্বোত্তম রক্ষাকর্তা " "Allah is the Best Protector"

Agency overview
- Formed: 15 June 1986; 40 years ago
- Employees: 300+ active personnel
- Annual budget: Classified

Jurisdictional structure
- Operations jurisdiction: Bangladesh (and abroad)
- Governing body: Government of Bangladesh
- Constituting instrument: Special Security Force Act, 2021

Operational structure
- Headquarters: SSF Headquarters, Dhaka
- Agency executive: Major General Mahbubus Samad Chowdhury, Director General

Facilities
- Prime Minister's Vehicles: Mercedes-Maybach S600; BMW 7 Series F02; Mercedes-Benz G-Class; Lexus LX; Nissan Patrol Y62; Toyota Land Cruiser; Toyota Land Cruiser Prado

Website
- ssf.gov.bd

The Special Security Force (Bengali: বিশেষ নিরাপত্তা বাহিনী; abbreviated as SSF) is a Bangladeshi law enforcement force that provides protection to the President, Prime Minister and the Chief Adviser as well as any person designated as a VVIP as per state protocol, including visiting foreign dignitaries.

== Responsibility ==
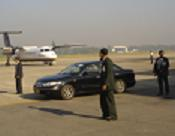
Special Security Force personnel providing protection

The mission of the SSF is to provide physical security to the President of Bangladesh, Prime Minister of Bangladesh and any person designated as a very very important person (VVIP) by the Government of Bangladesh. The SSF takes necessary measures in coordination with the civil administration and security and intelligence organizations to prevent future threats to VVIPs and protect VVIPs from active threats. The SSF is also responsible for the security of VVIPs' offices and residences.

== History ==
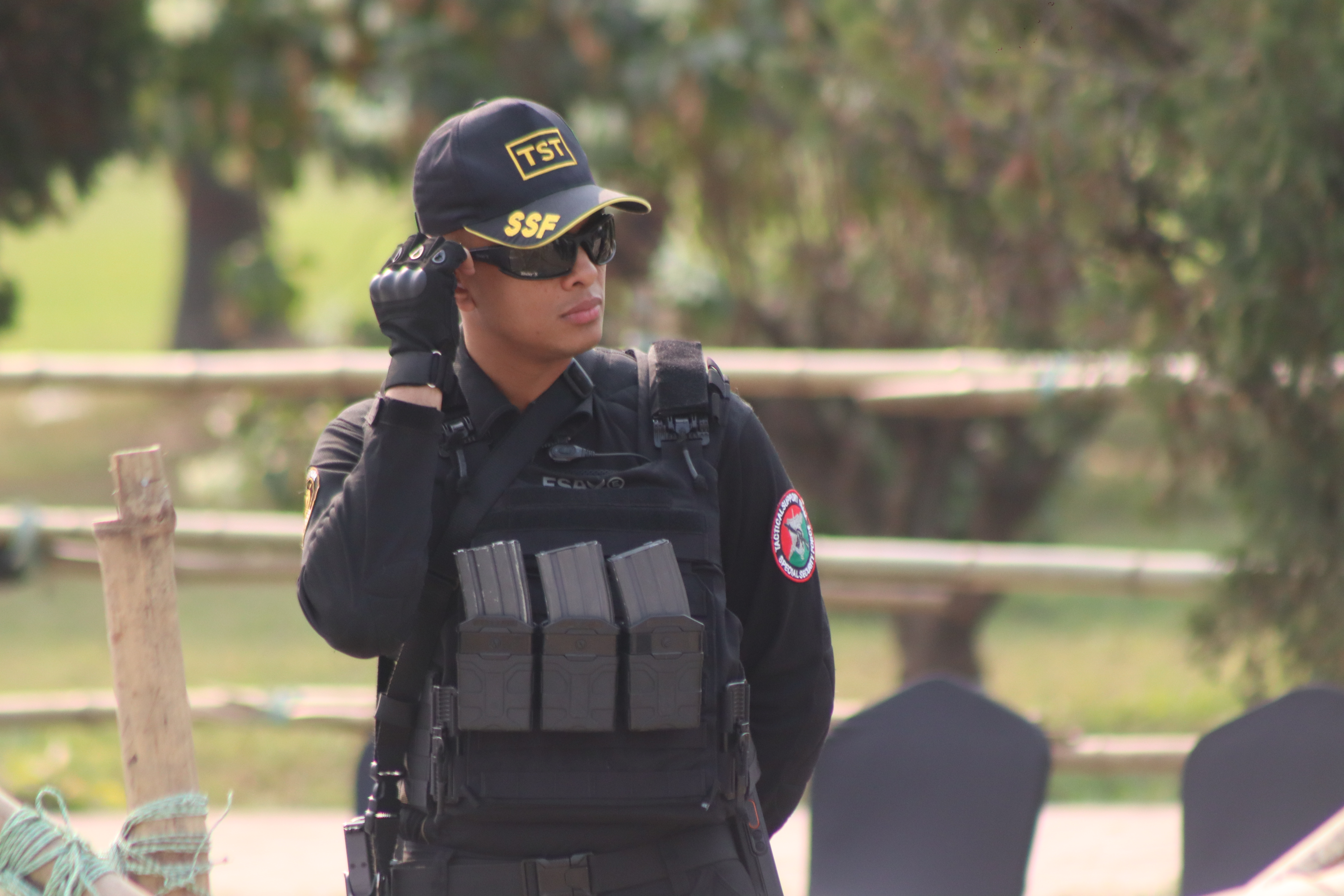
SSF during the funeral of Osman Hadi 2025

The idea of establishing a security force in Bangladesh for physical protection of VIPs was first mooted by the then-President Hussain Muhammad Ershad. Accordingly, the Presidential Security Force (PSF) was formed on 15 June 1986. Later, with the introduction of a parliamentary system of government in Bangladesh, the force was renamed as the Special Security Force on 27 September 1991.

The Presidential Security Force Ordinance (PSFO) established a security force which is to be under the direct command of the president and controlled and administered by a director, who may be invested with the powers of the Chief of Army Staff in respect of operations of the SSF. The force may seek the assistance of other services, such as law enforcement agencies, paramilitary forces and defence and intelligence agencies.

Members of the SSF are referred to as Agents, and are officers from the Bangladesh Army, Navy, Air Force, Police, Bangladesh Ansar and Village Defence Party. Persons from other ranks also actively support the organization.

The force was originally intended to provide physical security, both to the president wherever they may be and to VIPs, including any head of state or government or any person declared to be a VIP by the government. Following restoration of the parliamentary system, it was renamed the Special Security Force, whose primary function is to protect the prime minister, the president and other VIPs. Its work also includes "collecting and communicating intelligence affecting the physical security of the prime minister, the president or a VIP" (Section 8).

The SSF is now accountable to the prime minister under the present parliamentary system, and is given the power to arrest without warrant any person

when there is reason to believe that the presence or movement of such person at or near the place where the prime minister, the president or a VIP is living or staying or through which he is passing or about to pass is prejudicial to the physical security of the prime minister, the president or such VIP; and if such person forcibly resists the endeavor to arrest him or attempts to evade arrest, such officer may use all means necessary to effect the arrest and may, if necessary and after giving such warning as may be appropriate in the circumstances of the case or otherwise so, use force against him as to cause death (Section 8).

The wide and unfettered powers granted to the authorities above under the Special Security Force Ordinance (SSFO) enacted in 1986 are exacerbated by Section 11, which prevents prosecutions for such acts without government sanction.

In 2021, a bill was passed in the Parliament known as The Special Security Force Bill, 2021. This made the SSF responsible for providing security to the family members of Sheikh Mujibur Rahman. The following year, a Mujib Corner had been opened at the Special Security Force headquarters under the Director General Mujibur Rahman. On 29 August 2024, the interim government issued an ordinance revoking this law providing special security privileges to the family of Sheikh Mujibur Rahman, under which it was enacted in 2009 and 2021.

As other than protecting a Head of state, SSF also has to protect VVIP persons ordered by the nation. Muhammad Yunus, the former Chief Adviser of Interim government was given the VVIP status for one year in 2026. Due to the status, SSF forces could had to safeguard Muhammad Yunus for a time period.

== Organization ==
SSF personnel on duty

The SSF Headquarters is located at the Prime Minister office in Tejgaon, Dhaka. The SSF maintains an independent training complex and accommodations of its own, co-located near the headquarters.

Commanded by a director-general (equivalent in rank to a brigadier general or major general), the SSF is organized into five administrative bureaus:

- Tactical Support Team
- Operation and Protection Bureau
- Intelligence Bureau
- Logistics Bureau
- Training Bureau

== Weapons ==
S1 #	Name	Type	Caliber	Origin	Reference
1	Beretta 92	Semi-automatic pistol	9mm	Italy	

== List of director generals of Special Security Force ==
Sl #	Name	Term start	Term end	Reference
1	Brigadier General Jahangir Kabir	1 July 1986	19 December 1987	
2	Brigadier General Hasan Mashhud Chowdhury	19 December 1987	13 June 1988	
3	Brigadier General Kazi Mahmud Hassan	13 June 1988	4 November 1991	
4	Brigadier General Jamilud Din Ahsan	19 October 1991	26 July 1996	
5	Major General Nurul Ahmed Rafiqul Hossain	1 July 1996	16 February 2001	
6	Brigadier General Syed Mohammed Shabuddin	31 January 2001	11 November 2001	
7	Major General Syed Fatemi Ahmed Rumi	31 October 2001	8 February 2007	
8	Major General Sheikh Monirul Islam	8 February 2007	20 April 2008	
9	Major General Ashraf Abdullah Yussuf	24 April 2008	8 January 2009	
10	Major General Mia Mohammad Zainul Abedin	19 January 2009	27 November 2011	
11	Major General Chowdhury Hasan Sarwardy	27 November 2011	10 October 2012	
12	Major General Aman Hasan	10 October 2012	10 April 2016	
13	Major General Shafiqur Rahman	10 April 2016	6 August 2018	
14	Major General Mujibur Rahman	6 August 2018	25 February 2024	
15	Major General Nazmul Hasan	26 February 2024	20 August 2024	
16	Major General Mahbubus Samad Chowdhury	20 August 2024	present	
