= Mohammad Ashrafuzzaman Siddiqui =

Director General of the Border Guard Bangladesh

Ashrafuzzaman Siddiqui OSP, BSP, SUP, BGBM
- আশরাফুজ্জামান সিদ্দিকী
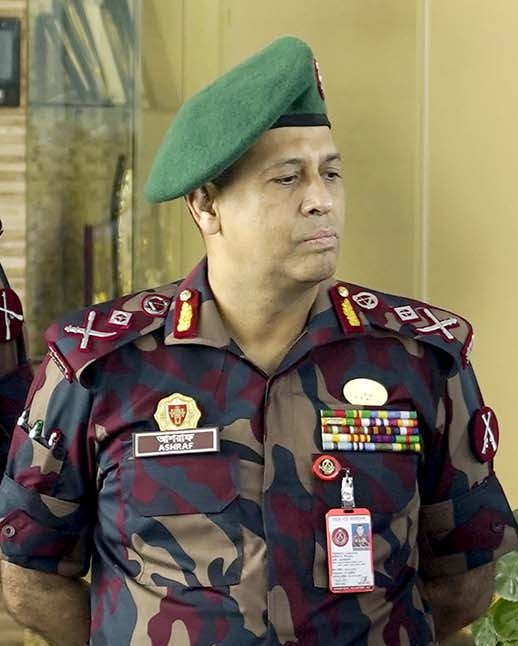
- Siddiqui in 2024

25th Director General of Border Guard Bangladesh
- Incumbent
- Assumed office 5 February 2024
- President: Mohammed Shahabuddin; Hafiz Uddin Ahmad (acting); Mirza Fakrul Islam Alamgir
- Prime Minister: Sheikh Hasina; Muhammad Yunus (acting); Tarique Rahman
- Preceded by: Nazmul Hasan

Personal details
- Education: Bangladesh Military Academy; Bangladesh University of Professionals; National Defence College; Defence Services Command and Staff College
- Awards: Osamanno Seba Padak; Bisisto Seba Padak; Sena Utkorsho Padak; Border Guard Bangladesh Medal

Military service
- Allegiance: Bangladesh
- Branch/service: Bangladesh Army; Border Guard Bangladesh
- Years of service: 1992–present
- Rank: Major General
- Unit: Regiment of Artillery
- Commands: Director General of Border Guard Bangladesh; Commander of 9th Artillery Brigade

Mohammad Ashrafuzzaman Siddiqui (Note: OSP, BSP, SUP, BGBM, ndc, psc, MPhill) is a two star officer in the Bangladesh Army. He is the incumbent director general of the Border Guard Bangladesh and current chairman of Shimanto Bank.Siddique was the former chairman of the Army Sports Control Board.

== Early life and education ==
Siddiqui enlisted to Bangladesh Military Academy and was commissioned in regiment of artillery on 20 December 1992. He obtained an MBA from Bangladesh University of Professionals.

== Military career ==
Siddique commanded an artillery brigade. At army headquarters, Siddiqui was the director of military training and furthermore, the chairman of army sports control board.

On 30 January 2024, Siddiqui was appointed as the director general of the Border Guard Bangladesh replacing Major General Nazmul Hasan. He assumed office on 5 February 2024. Soon after, Siddiqui remarked that the border guard would not allow any more Rohingyas to enter Bangladesh from Myanmar. He is the colonel commandant of Regiment of Artillery as well.
