= AKM Bazlur Rahman =

Bangladeshi Awami League politician

AKM Bazlur Rahman (Bengali: এ কে এম বজলুর রহমান) was an Awami League politician and recipient of the Independence Day Award, the highest civilian award in Bangladesh.

== Career ==
Rahman was a founding member of now banned Bangladesh Chhatra League in 1948.

In 1954, Rahman worked as the campaign manager of the United Front's candidate in Raipura, Narsingdi District. He was elected secretary of the Narsingdi District unit of the Awami League in 1955.

In 1965, Rahman was the secretary of the Dhaka District unit of Awami League.

== Death ==
In the aftermath of the assassination of Sheikh Mujibur Rahman, Bazlur Rahman was detained and tortured by the new regime. Rahman was paralyzed due to the torture. Rahman died on 8 February 1988. He was awarded the Independence Day Award posthumously in 2021 for his contribution to the Bangladesh Liberation War.

His son, Lt. Gen Mujibur Rahman, was made general officer commanding, Army Training and Doctrine Command on 6 August 2024.
