= Mia Mohammad Zainul Abedin =

Bangladesh Army Major General (1960–2019)

Mia Mohammad Zainul Abedin BB
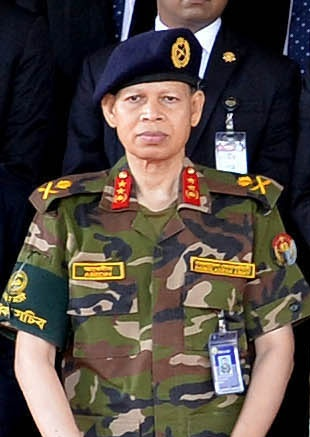
- Mia in 2017

10th Director General of Special Security Force
- In office 19 January 2009 – 27 November 2011
- President: Iajuddin Ahmed; Zillur Rahman
- Prime Minister: Sheikh Hasina
- Preceded by: Ashraf Abdullah Yusuf
- Succeeded by: Chowdhury Hasan Sarwardy

Personal details
- Born: 1 January 1960 Lohagara, East Pakistan, Pakistan
- Died: 17 December 2019 (aged 59) Mount Elizabeth Hospital, Singapore
- Awards: Bir Bikrom

Military service
- Allegiance: Bangladesh
- Branch: Bangladesh Army
- Service years: 1980–2019
- Rank: Major General
- Unit: East Bengal Regiment
- Commands: Special Security Force; President Guard Regiment; 72nd Infantry Brigade
- Conflicts: Chittagong Hill Tracts conflict

Mia Mohammad Zainul Abedin was a Bangladesh Army major general. He was the former military secretary to the prime minister of Bangladesh from 2011 to 2019. He was a recipient of the Bir Bikrom gallantry award.

== Early life ==
Abedin was born on 1 January 1960 in Lohagara, Chittagong District, East Pakistan, Pakistan. He graduated from Faujdarhat Cadet College in Chittagong.

== Career ==
Abedin was commissioned with the 2nd BMA long course in Bangladesh Army in 1980.

Abedin was placed in charge of the Special Security Force in 2009.

On 28 November 2011, he was made the military secretary to the prime minister of Bangladesh, Sheikh Hasina.

== Death ==
Abedin died on 17 December 2019 in Mount Elizabeth Hospital, Singapore.
