= Chowdhury Hasan Sarwardy =

Bangladeshi general

Chowdhury Hasan Sarwardy BB, SBP, BSP
- চৌধুরী হাসান সারওয়ার্দী
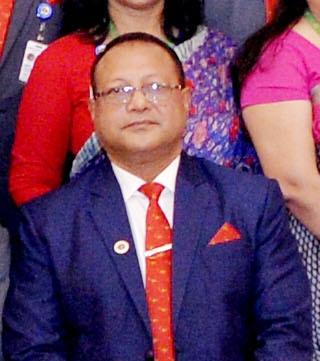

11th Director General of Special Security Force
- In office 27 November 2011 – 10 October 2012
- President: Zillur Rahman
- Prime Minister: Sheikh Hasina
- Preceded by: Mia Mohammad Zainul Abedin
- Succeeded by: Sheikh Mohammad Aman Hasan

Personal details
- Born: 15 February 1960 (age 66) Sandwip, East Pakistan, Pakistan
- Party: Liberal Democratic Party
- Awards: Bir Bikrom: Senabahini Padak(SBP); Bishishto Seba Padak (BSP); Independence Day Award

Military service
- Allegiance: Bangladesh
- Branch/service: Bangladesh Army; Bangladesh Ansar
- Years of service: 15 June 1980 – 31 May 2018
- Rank: Lieutenant General
- Unit: East Bengal Regiment
- Commands: Commandant of National Defence College; GOC of ARTDOC; GOC of 9th Infantry Division; Director General of Special Security Force; Vice Chancellor of Bangladesh University of Professionals; Director General of Bangladesh Ansar and Village Defence Party
- Battles/wars: UNAMSIL; UNOMOZ; Chittagong Hill Tracts Conflict

Chowdhury Hasan Sarwardy (Note: Bengali: চৌধুরী হাসান সারওয়ার্দী) (Note: BB, SBP, BSP, ndc, psc) (born 2 February 1960) is a retired lieutenant general of the Bangladesh Army and former commandant of the National Defence College. He previously served as GOC of Army Training and Doctrine Command (ARTDOC).

== Early life and education ==
He was born in 1960 in Sandwip Thana of Chittagong district. He was commissioned in the East Bengal Regiment on 15 June 1980 with the 2nd BMA Long Course. Sarwardy is a graduate of both the Defence Services Command and Staff College and the National Defence College. He also obtained an LLB degree,a master's degree in defense studies, a master's in security studies, a master's in political science, a master's in business administration, and an M Phil in national development and security studies. He has also been awarded a PhD from the Bangladesh University of Professionals.

== Military career ==
Sarwardy commanded an infantry battalion, a rifle battalion, a rifle sector, and an infantry brigade. He held appointments at both division and Army Headquarters. He served as battalion commander at the Bangladesh Military Academy, director of operations in the former Bangladesh Rifles, and director of the Military Intelligence Directorate in the Bangladesh Army. He was the founding member and chief instructor at the Non Commissioned Officers' Academy. He commanded a Bangladesh Army delegation to Fort Benning on 24 July 2014, which was received by Major General Austin S. Miller.

He became a major general in April 2010. After his tenure as DMI (Director Military Intelligence), Sarwardy was appointed DG of Bangladesh Ansar and Village Defence Party Directorate on deputation from the army. Later he was appointed vice chancellor of Bangladesh University of Professionals. He served as area commander for Logistic Area Dhaka and director general of the Special Security Force, Prime Minister's Office. He served in the SSF from 27 November 2011 to 10 September 2012. He commanded the 9th Infantry Division of the Bangladesh Army. He was promoted to the rank of lieutenant general and made the GOC of Army Training and Doctrine Command (ARTDOC) at the Mymensingh Cantonment. His last command was as a commandant of the National Defense College (NDC), which led to his retirement from active service on 31 May 2018.

=== UN missions ===
He was the founding member and pioneer senior instructor and chief instructor in the Bangladesh Institute of Peace Support Operations Training (BIPSOT). He served as an instructor in Switzerland, the United States, and Nepal to conduct training on United Nations affairs. He also led a delegation of the Bangladesh Army for UN training in Nepal in 1999. He served in Mozambique as a United Nations Military Observer and chief of operations of the Bangladesh Contingent in Sierra Leone.

Sarwardy joined the Liberal Democratic Party in April 2025.

== Recognition ==
Sarwardy received the gallantry award Bir Bikrom for displaying courage during a counter-insurgency operation in the Chittagong Hill Tracts, in which he captured the enemy camp after he had been shot severely. Bir Bikrom Bengali: বীর বিক্রম, lit. 'Valiant hero' is the third highest gallantry award in Bangladesh. Hasan led the rescue operation at Tazreen Garments, Savar, in December 2012. He led the rescue operation of Rana Plaza in Savar. He received the "Senabahini Padak" (SBP) for his leadership in the rescue operation. Bangladesh broke the record for the largest human flag on 16 December 2013, also led by Hasan. On 26 March 2014, Bangladesh again made a new record by having the largest number of people singing the national anthem at Dhaka, led by Hasan Sarwardy. The two world records went down to Guinness Book. Sarwardy was awarded Bishisto Seba Padak (BSP) for these world records. Lt General Sarwardy headed the writing team of Bangladesh Defence Policy. For his outstanding contribution, he was awarded the Oshamanno Seba Padak (OSP) by the nation. Sarwardy was instrumental and the founding head of the most modern Computerized War Game Centre for the Bangladesh Army. Sarwardy was an adviser of the Shornokishoree Network. For his outstanding performance, the organization awarded him as "Shorno Manob" in 2018.

== Personal life ==
He married twice. His first wife was Farzana Nigar. With whom he has a daughter and a son. After their divorce, he again married media personality Farzana Brownia in November 2018. He is a founding member of Bogra Golf Club. Bogra Golf Club (BGC) is situated inside Majhira Cantonment on the western side of the Dhaka-Bogra highway. It is a 9-hole golf course of par 36 covering approximately 52.05 acres of land.

== Honours ==

| | Bishishto Seba Padak (BSP) | Bir Bikrom Medal | Nirapotta Padak Medal |
| Dabanal Padak Medal | Uttoron Padak Medal | Independence Day Award Medal | Flood Relief of 1988 Medal |
| Cyclone Relief of 1991 Medal | Great Flood Relief of 1998 Medal | 1991 National Election Medal | 1996 National Election Medal |
| 2001 National Election Medal | Silver Jubilee Medal (25 years of liberation) | Golden Jubilee Medal (50th anniversary of East Bengal Regiment) | 27 years service |
| 20 years service | 10 years service | UNOMOZ Medal | UNAMSIL Medal |
