= National Narcotics Control Board (Bangladesh) =

Bangladesh government body responsible for drug policy

The National Narcotics Control Board is the highest-level government body responsible for formulating a drug policy in Bangladesh.

== History ==
The National Narcotics Control Board was formed through the passage of the Narcotics Control Act in 1990. The board is headed by the Minister of Home Affairs and falls under the Ministry of Home Affairs. The board has been described as ineffective by The Daily Star. The board was designed to provide policy guidelines to the Department of Narcotics Control.
