= Mahbubus Samad Chowdhury =

Bangladeshi military personnel

Mahbubus Samad Chowdhury BSP
- মাহবুবুস সামাদ চৌধুরী
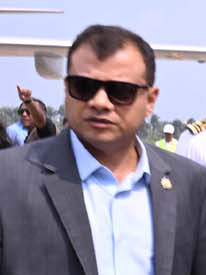
- Chowdhury in 2025

16th Director General of Special Security Force
- Incumbent
- Assumed office 20 August 2024
- President: Mohammed Shahabuddin; Hafiz Uddin Ahmad (acting); Mirza Fakhrul Islam Alamgir
- Prime Minister: Muhammad Yunus (acting); Tarique Rahman
- Preceded by: Nazmul Hasan

Personal details
- Awards: Bishishto Seba Padak (BSP)

Military service
- Allegiance: Bangladesh
- Branch/service: Bangladesh Army
- Years of service: 1991 - present
- Rank: Major General
- Unit: Bangladesh Infantry Regiment
- Commands: Director General of Special Security Force

Mahbubus Samad Chowdhury (Note: Bengali: মাহবুবুস সামাদ চৌধুরী) is a two star officer of the Bangladesh Army and the incumbent director general of Special Security Force.

== Education ==
Chowdhury enlisted to Bangladesh Military Academy on 1989 and was commissioned in the East Bengal Regiment in December 1991. He is a graduate of Command and Staff College Quetta, Pakistan and the National Defence College from Mirpur, Dhaka. Chowdhury furthermore attended the Turkish Military Academy on special operations courses. Chowdhury obtained his master's degree four times, first in defence studies from the National University, Bangladesh on 2004 and then on Master of Science on military strategy from University of Balochistan in 2006. Chowdhury received his other two master's degrees from the Bangladesh University of Professionals on Master of Social Science and peace in 2020 and 2022 respectively. Chowdhury achieved the Chancellors Gold Medal in the Master of Peace, Conflict and Human Rights Studies from Bangladesh University of Professionals in 2023.

== Military career ==
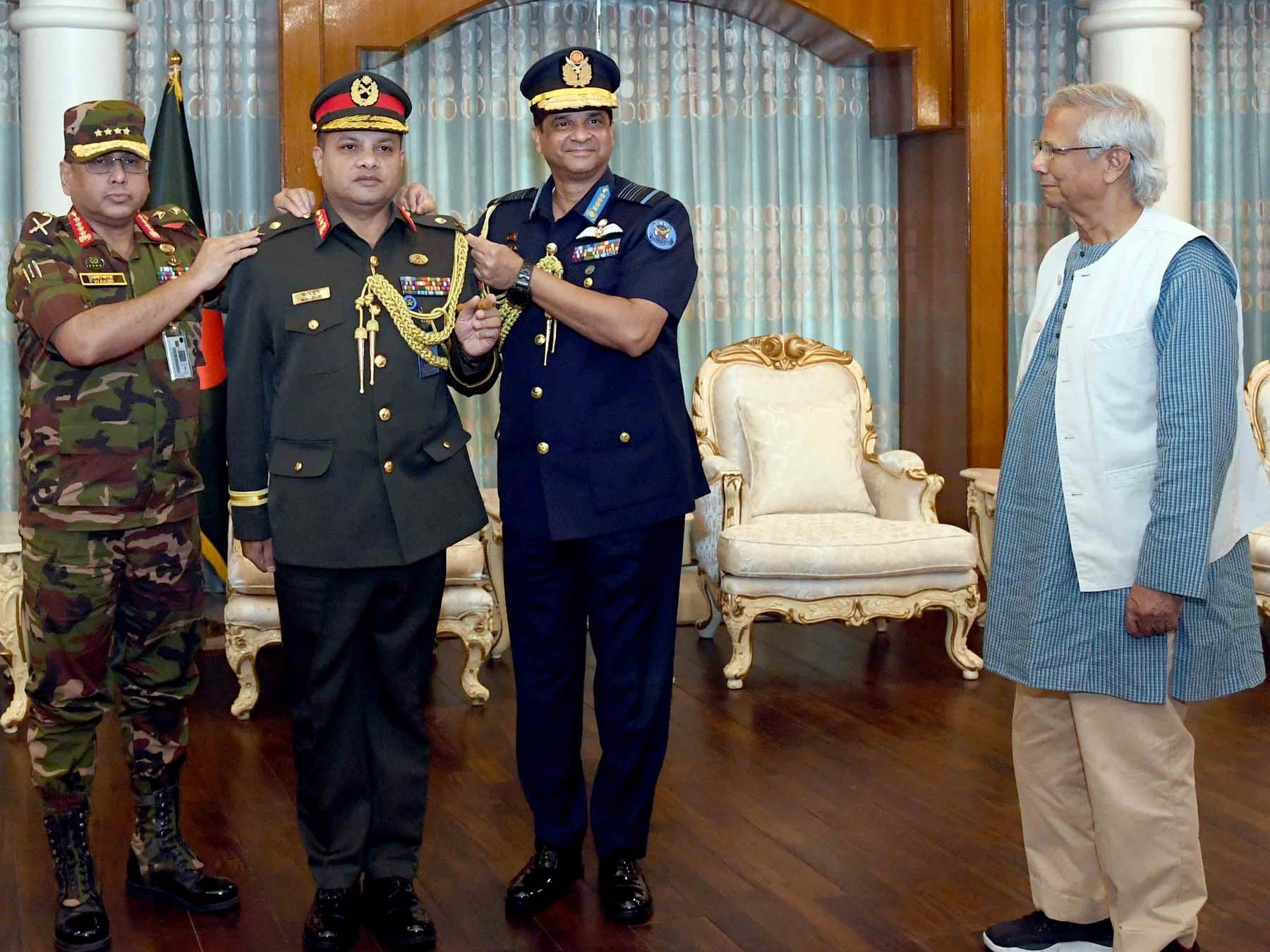
Chowdhury adorning the rank of major general at Jamuna State Guest House, 2024

Chowdhury commanded two infantry companies and one infantry battalion, the 28th Bangladesh Infantry Regiment. He served as brigade major of 46th Independent Infantry Brigade at Dhaka Cantonment, instructed at the School of Infantry and Tactics in Jalalabad Cantonment and furthermore served as general staff officer (grade-1) of the 33rd Infantry Division in Comilla. Chowdhury was upgraded to colonel on 2017 and instructed at the Bangladesh Institute of Peace Support Operation Training. He returned to 33rd Infantry Division for serving as the colonel staff at divisional headquarters. Chowdhury also served as chief operations officer at the army war game centre under the ARTDOC headquarters. Chowdhury was then promoted to brigadier general on 2020 and was designated as the commander of 2nd infantry brigade at Ramu Cantonment. Chowdhury was the task force Commander for the security of Rohingya camps. He was director of infantry in 2024. He was promoted to major general in August 2024 and appointed as the director general of Special Security Force succeeding major general Nazmul Hasan.

=== United Nations peacekeeping missions ===
Chowdhury served in United Nations peacekeeping thrice. First as captain, under UNAMSIL in Sierra Leone as military observer in 1999. He later served as major with the MONUSCO in Democratic Republic of the Congo as operations officer of BANBAT-6 on 2008. Chowdhury again served in 2012 in the rank of lieutenant colonel as officer of Bangladesh peacekeeping affairs (P-4) with MINUSMA department in the Headquarters of the United Nations.
