= Sheikh Muhammad Monirul Islam =

8th Director General of Special Security Force
- In office 8 February 2007 – 20 April 2008
- President: Iajuddin Ahmed
- Prime Minister: Fakhruddin Ahmed (acting)
- Preceded by: Syed Fatemi Ahmed Rumi
- Succeeded by: Ashraf Abdullah Yussuf

Personal details
- Born: 27 March 1958 (age 68) Khulna, East Pakistan, Pakistan
- Known for: Chief External & Corporate Affairs Officer, bKash Limited

Military service
- Allegiance: Bangladesh
- Branch/service: Bangladesh Army
- Years of service: 1978–2012
- Rank: Major General
- Unit: East Bengal Regiment
- Commands: Commander of 88th Infantry Brigade; Director General of Special Security Force; Director General of National Security Intelligence; Director General of Bangladesh Institute of International and Strategic Studies; GOC of 11th Infantry Division; GOC of 33rd Infantry Division
- Battles/wars: UNIIMOG

Sheikh Muhammad Monirul Islam is a retired major general of the Bangladesh Army and chief external and corporate affairs officer of bKash Limited.

== Career ==
Monir was commissioned in the East Bengal Regiment in 1978.

From 1988 to 1989, Monir served as an observer in United Nations Iran-Iraq Military Observer Group (UNIIMOG), the first contingent of 15 army officers from Bangladesh.

He served as an instructor in the Bangladesh Military Academy, Bhatiary, and the Defence Services Command & Staff College.

In the rank of brigadier general, he was posted to the Ministry of Foreign Affairs on deputation as the chief of protocol of Bangladesh.

Monir has a Masters of Defence Studies from National University of Bangladesh, and a Master of Science on defence and strategic studies from Madras University, Chennai, India. He is a graduate of the Defence Services Command & Staff College and National Defence College, Mirpur, Bangladesh.

Monir had served as the director general of the Special Security Force, director general of National Security Intelligence and director general of Bangladesh Institute of International and Strategic Studies.

Monir has commanded two infantry divisions in Bogra and Comilla as the general officer commanding and area commander.

After retiring from the Bangladesh Army, he joined bKash as the chief external and corporate affairs officer in 2014.
