= Syed Fatemi Ahmed Rumi =

Bangladeshi military personnel

- সৈয়দ ফাতেমী আহমেদ রুমি
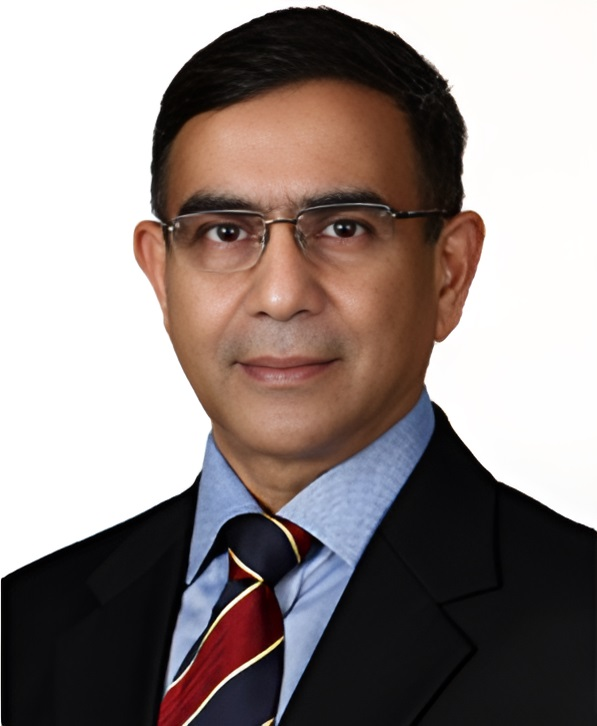

7th Director General of Special Security Force
- In office 31 October 2001 – 8 February 2007
- President: Shahabuddin Ahmed; Badruddoza Chowdhury; Iajuddin Ahmed
- Prime Minister: Khaleda Zia; Iajuddin Ahmed (acting); Fazlul Haque (acting); Fakhruddin Ahmed (acting)
- Preceded by: Syed Mohammed Shabuddin
- Succeeded by: Sheikh Md Monirul Islam

Military service
- Allegiance: Bangladesh
- Branch/service: Bangladesh Army
- Years of service: 1976–2009
- Rank: Major General
- Unit: East Bengal Regiment
- Commands: Chairman of Bangladesh Institute of International and Strategic Studies; GOC of 66th Infantry Division; Director General of Special Security Force; Commander of 111th Infantry Brigade
- Battles/wars: 2006-2008 Bangladeshi political crisis

Syed Fatemi Ahmed Rumi is a retired major general of the Bangladesh Army and former director general of Special Security Force.

== Career ==
During the Bangladesh Nationalist Party rule from 2001 to 2006, Rumi served as the director general of Special Security Force. He backed the military supported caretaker government that took power during the 2006–2008 Bangladeshi political crisis. During his military service, other officers referred to him as Shada (white) Rumi to distinguish him from his contemporary Major General Sadik Hasan Rumi, who was known as Kala (black) Rumi.

In January 2007, Rumi was made the general officer commanding of the 66th Infantry Division which was based in Rangpur Cantonment and Major General Sheikh Md Manirul Islam replaced him as the director general of Special Security Force. He worked with the chief of staff of the Bangladesh Army, Moeen U Ahmed, to establish Rangpur University and a new political party called Jago Bangladesh.

In February 2009, Rumi was made the chairman of Bangladesh Institute of International and Strategic Studies a state operated think tank. The Government of Bangladesh sent him and Lieutenant General Aminul Karim, commandant of the National Defence College, to forced retirement in March 2009.
