= A. K. M. Nazmul Hasan =

Bangladeshi major general

Nazmul Hasan
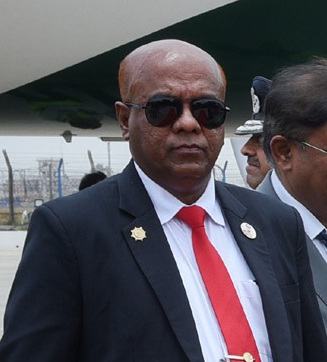
- Hasan in 2024

15th Director General of Special Security Force
- In office 26 February 2024 – 20 August 2024
- President: Mohammed Shahabuddin
- Prime Minister: Sheikh Hasina; Muhammad Yunus (acting)
- Preceded by: Mujibur Rahman
- Succeeded by: Mahbubus Samad Chowdhury

24th Director General of Border Guard Bangladesh
- In office 18 January 2023 – 30 January 2024
- President: Abdul Hamid; Mohammed Shahabuddin
- Prime Minister: Sheikh Hasina
- Preceded by: Shakil Ahmed
- Succeeded by: Ashrafuzzaman Siddiqui

Personal details
- Born: 2 January 1969 (age 57) Faridpur, East Pakistan, Pakistan
- Education: University of Chittagong Military Training Bangladesh Military Academy

Military service
- Allegiance: Bangladesh
- Branch/service: Bangladesh Army; Bangladesh Ansar; Border Guard Bangladesh
- Years of service: 1988–2024
- Rank: Major General
- Unit: Bangladesh Infantry Regiment
- Commands: Commandant of East Bengal Regimental Centre; Director General of Special Security Force; Director General of Border Guards Bangladesh; Director General of Bangladesh Ansar and Village Defence Party; GOC of 11th Infantry Division
- Battles/wars: Chittagong Hill Tracts Conflict; UNMIBH; UNAMID

A. K. M. Nazmul Hasan (Note: BGBM, BAM, ndc, psc) is a retired major general in the Bangladesh Army and was commandant of the East Bengal Regimental Centre. Prior to that, he served as the director general of the Special Security Force. Before that, he was the 24th director general of the Border Guards Bangladesh (BGB). He also served as the director general of the Bangladesh Ansar and the Village Defence Party. He was general officer commanding (GOC) of the 11th Infantry Division and area commander, Bogura Area.

== Early life and education ==
Hasan was born on 2 January 1969 in Faridpur District, East Pakistan, now Bangladesh. He completed his Bachelor of Science degree from the University of Chittagong and his Master's in Defence Studies (MDS) degree from the National University. He also completed the Army Staff Course from the Defence Services Command and Staff College and the National Defence Course from the National Defence College.

== Career ==
Nazmul Hasan joined the Bangladesh Military Academy with the 18th BMA Long Course on 15 July 1986 and was commissioned on 24 June 1988 in the Infantry Corps.

Hasan served as the general staff officer grade-3 (training) at the School of Infantry and Tactics. He carried out counterinsurgency activities in the Rangamati district in the 1990s during the Chittagong Hill Tracts conflict. He served as the quarter master general of the Bangladesh Army's Composite Brigade. At Bangladesh Army Headquarters, he served as the deputy provost marshal. He was the colonel general staff at Comilla Cantonment. He served as the Dhaka Detachment commander.

Hasan served as GOC of the Bogura Area for more than two years. He also served as director of the Counter Intelligence Bureau at the Directorate General of Forces Intelligence. Nazmul served in the United Nations Mission in Bosnia and Herzegovina as a platoon commander in 1994 at Bihac Pocket and as officer commanding of the Sector Reserve at Nyala, Darfur, Sudan, in 2010. Hasan has commanded infantry battalions and military police units.

Hasan was the general officer commanding of the 11th Infantry Division based in Bogra Cantonment. Hasan joined the Bangladesh Ansar and VDP on 21 July 2022. He replaced Major General Mizanur Rahman Shamim. He was also the chairman of the Ansar-VDP Unnayan Bank.

On 17 January 2023, the government appointed Hasan as the director general of the Border Guards Bangladesh, a paramilitary unit responsible for guarding the borders of Bangladesh. On 30 January 2024, Mohammad Ashrafuzzaman Siddiqui was appointed director general of the Border Guards Bangladesh, replacing Hasan.
