= Shafiqur Rahman (general) =

Former Chief of General Staff of the Bangladesh Army

Shafiqur Rahman SPP, OSP
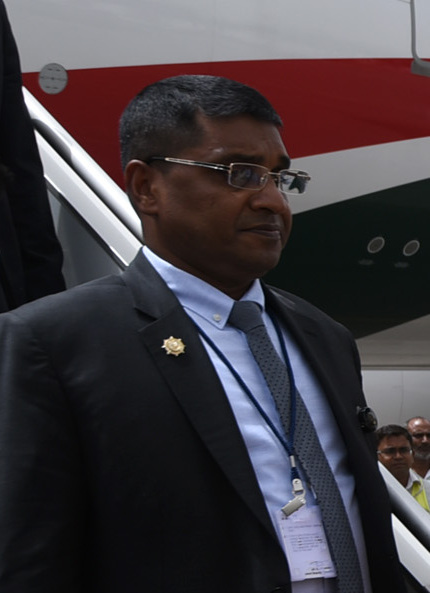
- Shafiqur in 2017

13th Director General of Special Security Force
- In office 10 April 2016 – 6 August 2018
- President: Abdul Hamid
- Prime Minister: Sheikh Hasina
- Preceded by: Sheikh Mohammad Aman Hasan
- Succeeded by: Mujibur Rahman

Personal details
- Born: December 31, 1962 (age 63) Shariatpur, East Pakistan, Pakistan
- Awards: Sena Parodorshita Padak (SPP); Oshamanno Sheba Padak (OSP)

Military service
- Allegiance: Bangladesh
- Branch/service: Bangladesh Army
- Years of service: 1984 – 2020
- Rank: Lieutenant general
- Unit: East Bengal Regiment
- Commands: Chief of General Staff at Army Headquarters; Director General of Special Security Force; GOC of 55th Infantry Division; GOC of 19th Infantry Division; GOC of 24th Infantry Division; Commander of 71st Mechanized Brigade
- Battles/wars: UNOSOM I

Shafiqur Rahman OSP, SPP, afwc, psc is a retired three star general of Bangladesh Army who served as the chief of general staff. He is the former director general of the Special Security Force (SSF), the agency in charge of protecting the Prime Minister of Bangladesh, and also served as director of military operations (DMO) at Army Headquarters.

== Early life and education ==
Shafiqur Rahman was born on 31 December 1962 in Shariatpur District, East Pakistan, Pakistan. He was commissioned in the Infantry Corps of the Bangladesh Army from the 11th BMA Long Course on 21 December 1984. Rahman completed OPCW Advance Course in the Netherlands, Junior Staff Course in Pakistan, Command & General Staff Course in the Philippines, and OPCW Basic Course in Romania. He graduated from the Defence Services Command and Staff College and completed the Army War Course at the National Defence College. He completed a master's degree in defense studies from National University of Bangladesh. He completed another master's on war studies from Bangladesh University of Professionals and received a Chancellor's Award for his masters work.

== Career ==
Rahman has held a number of command positions in the Bangladesh Army. He was infantry battalion commander, infantry brigade commander of 71 Inf. Bde. of 9th Div. in Savar, and commanded three infantry divisions. He was the GOC of 55 Infantry Division and 19 Infantry Division and 24 Infantry Division. He served as the director military operations (DMO) at Army Headquarters General Staff Branch. He was part of the Bangladesh contingent sent to the United Nations Operation in Somalia I. He served in an infantry division as a colonel staff. He served as a brigade major. He served as the general staff officer (operation) second class. He was the private secretary to the principal staff officer of the Armed Forces Division. He was the general staff officer (operations) of an independent infantry brigade. He was an instructor in the Bangladesh Military Academy and the School of Infantry and Tactics. He was a senior instructor in the Defense Services Command and Staff College. He was Bangladesh's senior military liaison officer in the Headquarters of the United Nations in New York City. In 2015, He served as the Chittagong Area commander. He was appointed the director general of Special Security Force on 10 April 2016. On 28 July 2018, he was promoted to Lt general and appointed as the chief of general staff of the army leaving Maj Gen Mojibur Rahman as the director general of the SSF.

=== Post-retirement ===
After retirement, he became director of National Bank Limited, nominated by Shikder Insurance Company Ltd.
