= Jamilud Din Ahsan =

Jamiluddin Ahsan BP
- জামিলউদ্দীন আহসান

4th Director General of Special Security Force
- In office 19 October 1991 – 26 July 1996
- President: Abdur Rahman Biswas
- Prime Minister: Khaleda Zia
- Preceded by: Kazi Mahmud Hasan
- Succeeded by: Rafiqul Hossain

Personal details
- Born: 11 May 1951 (age 74) Chittagong, East Bengal, Pakistan
- Awards: Bir Protik

Military service
- Allegiance: Bangladesh
- Branch/service: Bangladesh Army
- Years of service: 1971 – 2006
- Rank: Major General
- Unit: East Bengal Regiment
- Commands: Station Commander, Comilla; Director General of Special Security Force; Director General of Bangladesh Institute of International and Strategic Studies; Commandant of Bangladesh Ordnance Factories; GOC of 55th Infantry Division; Master General of Ordnance at Army Headquarters
- Battles/wars: Bangladesh Liberation War

Jamilud Din Ahsan is a retired major general of the Bangladesh Army and former ambassador of Bangladesh to Libya. He is a recipient of Bir Protik, the fourth highest gallantry award of Bangladesh, for his actions in the Bangladesh Liberation War.

Ahsan is a member of the Sector Commanders Forum. He is a member of the Bangladesh War Courses Foundation.

== Career ==
Ahsan fought in the Bangladesh Liberation War, for which he was awarded Bir Protik. He was the commander of Charlie Company of the 4th East Bengal Regiment and fought in the Battle of Salda. He was commissioned in the Bangladesh Army under the war courses.

On 19 October 1991, Ahsan was appointed the director general of the Special Security Force, succeeding Brigadier General Kazi Mahmud Hassan. On 26 July 1996, he was succeeded by Major General Nurul Ahmed Rafiqul Hossain.

From 7 March 2000 to 13 October 2001, he was the director general of the Bangladesh Institute of International and Strategic Studies.

Ahsan was the master general of ordnance of the Bangladesh Army. On 11 September 2005, he was appointed ambassador of Bangladesh to Libya.

Ahsan opposed a defense pact with India at a roundtable titled New Dimension of Bangladesh-India Relations: Problems and Prospects.

Ahsan was the coordinator of the Sector Commanders Forum-Muktijudda 71. In February 2022, his name was proposed for the role of commissioner on the Bangladesh Election Commission.
