= Kazi Mahmud Hasan =

Bangladeshi footballer (1946 – 2014)

3rd Director General of Special Security Force
- In office 13 June 1988 – 4 November 1991
- President: Hussain Muhammad Ershad; Shahabuddin Ahmed (acting)
- Prime Minister: Moudud Ahmed; Kazi Zafar Ahmed; Khaleda Zia
- Preceded by: Hasan Mashhud Chowdhury
- Succeeded by: Jamilud Din Ahsan

Personal details
- Born: 28 January 1946 Gazipur, Bengal Province, British India
- Died: 4 February 2014 (aged 68) Dhaka, Bangladesh
- Awards: National Sports Award

Military service
- Allegiance: Pakistan (before 1973); Bangladesh
- Branch/service: Pakistan Army; Bangladesh Army
- Years of service: 1966 - 1989
- Rank: Brigadier General
- Unit: Army Service Corps
- Commands: Director General of Special Security Force; Commandant of Army School of Physical Training and Sports; Station Commander, Cumilla
- Battles/wars: Indo-Pakistani War of 1965
Association football career
- Position: Defender
Youth career
- 1965–1966: Dhaka University
Senior career*
Years	Team	Apps	(Gls)
1965	Central Printing Press		
1966	EPG Press		
1966	Victoria		
1966–1971	Pakistan Army		
1973–1974	Bangladesh Army		
International career
1969	Pakistan		
Managerial career
- Bangladesh Army
- * Club domestic league appearances and goals

Kazi Mahmud Hasan (Bengali: কাজী মাহমুদ হাসান; 28 January 1946 – 4 February 2014) was a Bangladeshi football player, politician, and one star military officer. Hasan is one of the few footballers from East Pakistan to have represented the Pakistan national football team. He served in the Pakistan Army and later in the Bangladesh Army, retiring as the antecedent director general of the Special Security Force.

== Early life and education ==
Hasan was born on 28 January 1946 in Gazipur. He got involved in sports when he was a student, and represented school and college football teams from 1959 to 1964. He later also represented Dhaka University from 1965 to 1966, captaining the football team of the institution in 1965.

== Career ==
=== Club career ===
In 1965, Hasan was selected by Dhaka First Division League club Central Printing Press. In 1966, he participated in the Aga Khan Gold Cup with East Pakistan Government Press. In the same year, he participated in the National Championship after finishing East Zone runners-up with the Dhaka University team.

In 1966, he was selected to play in the Dhaka League for Victoria Sporting Club, for which he also played in the Aga Khan Gold Cup. In 1969, Hasan represented the Pakistan national team at the 1969 RCD Cup held in Ankara, Turkey. He also toured Iran with the national team. Hasan retired as a player in 1974 due to an injury during a game against Dhaka University, where he scored the winning goal through a free kick, but ultimately had to leave the pitch after receiving a foul by Pearu of the opposite team. The same year, Hasan took eight months of training course in East Germany, and later coached the Bangladesh Army football team, guiding the side to win the National Championship jointly with Dhaka University in 1980 and 1981. Hasan was also the founding member of the Dhaka based Sonali Otit Club.

=== Military career ===
Hasan enlisted in the Pakistan Military Academy in Kakul at the eve of the Indo-Pakistani war of 1965 through the Pakistan emergency war cadre in the Inter Services Selection Board and was commissioned in the Pakistan Army Corps of Service in 1966. After joining the Pakistan Army, he represented the Pakistan Army football team, where he also captained on several occasions. In 1968, he successfully completed a football training course in Karachi, and in 1969, under his leadership, the Pakistan Army team won the Inter-Army Football Championship. While serving in West Pakistan, Hasan commanded two supply and transport battalions as a major at Lahore Cantonment and Karachi Cantonment. He was detained during the Bangladesh Liberation War at Karachi Cantonment and repatriated to Bangladesh in 1973. He was promoted to lieutenant colonel and joined the Bangladesh Army football team the same year. After his emeritus from football career in 1974, he was appointed commandant of the Army School of Physical Training and Sports. He was promoted to colonel in 1980 and tenured as colonel administrative of the Rangpur area headquarters. He was, furthermore, the station commander at Cumilla Cantonment. In 1988 Hasan was promoted to brigadier general and was designated as director general of the Special Security Force. Hasan retired from the army in 1989 and kept serving the special security forces till 1991 and was succeeded by Brigadier General Jamilud Din Ahsan as director general. In December 1991, he was transferred to the Ministry of Foreign Affairs as defence attaché to Sweden. He went into retirement from administrative services in 1993.

=== Political career ===
An army staff officer during the regime of President Hussain Muhammad Ershad, Hasan joined the Kazi Zafar Ahmed faction of the Jatiya Party during the 10th parliamentary elections. Hasan was the first general secretary of Army Sports Control Board of Bangladesh, and received the National Sports Award in 1981.

== Death ==
Hasan died on the night of Tuesday, 4 February 2014, at the United Hospital in Dhaka, due to a cardiac arrest at the age of 68. Hasan was taken to the hospital after he had fallen sick in his residence around 9:00pm, and the doctors there declared him dead around two hours later. His body has been kept at the mortuary of Combined Military Hospital in Dhaka Cantonment.
