= Nabila Idris =

Bangladeshi academic and human rights advocate

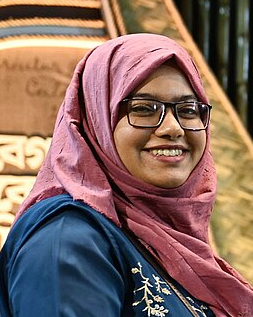
- Nabila Idris in 2025
- Occupations: Academic, human rights activist
- Known for: Member of the Commission of Inquiry on Enforced Disappearances
- Awards: Begum Rokeya Padak (2025)

Academic background
- Education: University of York (2014); Communication University of China (2015); University of Cambridge (PhD)
- Thesis: The politics of social protection in Bangladesh: The making of the National Social Security Strategy (2021)

Nabila Idris (Bengali: নাবিলা ইদ্রিস, Bengali pronunciation: [nabila idris]) is a Bangladeshi academic and human rights advocate, who serves as a member of the Commission of Inquiry on Enforced Disappearances in Bangladesh. She received the Begum Rokeya Padak in 2025 for her contributions to human rights.

== Early life ==
Idris earned her PhD from the University of Cambridge. Her 2021 thesis was titled "The politics of social protection in Bangladesh: The making of the National Social Security Strategy". Before that, she completed a master’s degree in Social Policy with distinction from the University of York in 2014, and later a second master’s degree in International Journalism and Communication from the Communication University of China in Beijing in 2015.

Nabila Idris is the daughter of Dr M. Idris Ali, who was an associate professor of spinal surgery at Bangabandhu Sheikh Mujib Medical University (BSMMU). In 2008, Ali was the physician supervising the treatment of BNP leader Tarique Rahman at BSMMU for spinal injuries that resulted from torture in custody during Bangladesh’s military-backed caretaker government. Countering claims made by intelligence agents that Rahman’s spinal condition dated back to 2005, Ali publicly stated that X-ray, CT and MRI examinations had revealed disc fractures and that the injury could have been caused by a fall or a blunt instrument. The medical board disputed the intelligence agents’ characterization of Rahman’s condition as merely a recurrence of the earlier complaint. Ali later referred Rahman to a hospital in London. In March 2009, BNP chairperson and former prime minister Khaleda Zia visited Ali while he was hospitalized in Dhaka.

== Career ==
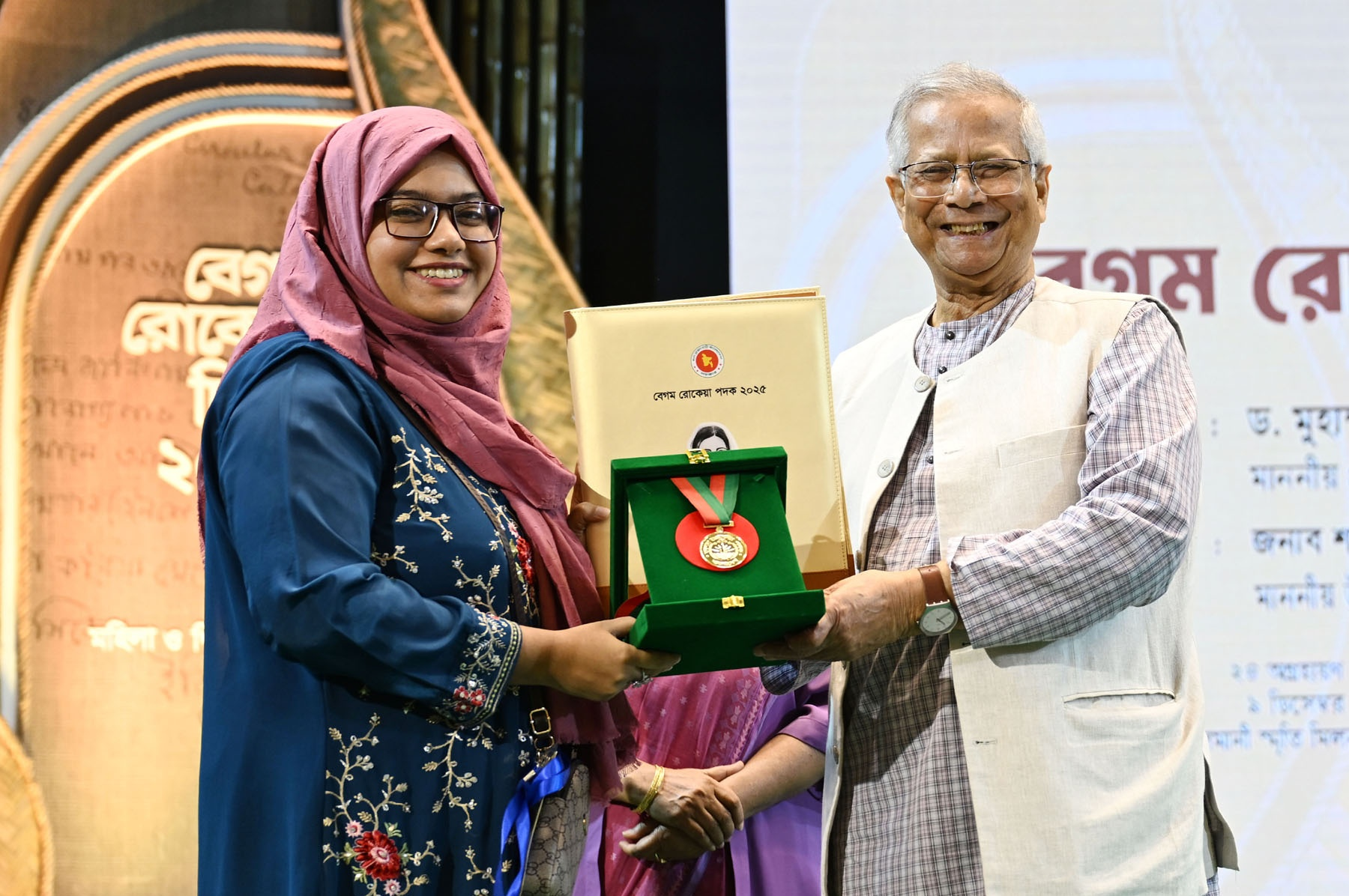
Idris receiving the Begum Rokeya Padak (2025) from Chief Adviser Muhammad Yunus

Idris is the Commissioner of Bangladesh's National Human Rights Commission. Earlier she was the member of the Commission of Inquiry on Enforced Disappearances in Bangladesh.

She works as a part-time research fellow at the BRAC Institute of Governance and Development, BRAC University. She is the founding president of "CommunityAction".

She received the Begum Rokeya Padak in 2025 for her contributions to human rights.

== Views ==
Idris argues that years of enforced disappearances, torture, extrajudicial killings, and other forms of state repression under the government of Sheikh Hasina culminated in widespread public demands for accountability and democratic reform.

== Publications ==
=== Articles ===
- Idris, Nabila; Lambin, Roosa; Yeates, Nicola (2025-08-01). "Thinking afresh: Closing the global funding gap to realise universal social protection". Global Social Policy. 25 (2): 346–350. doi:10.1177/14680181241290162. ISSN 1468-0181.
