= Department of Prisons (Bangladesh) =

Bangladeshi ministry department

Department of Prison
- Formation: 1973
- Headquarters: Dhaka, Bangladesh
- Region served: Bangladesh
- Official language: Bengali
- Inspector General of Prison: Brigadier General Md Anwarul Kabir
- Additional Inspector General of Prisons: Colonel Sheikh Sujaur Rahman
- Budget: ৳1360 crore (US$110 million) 2026-2027
- Website: prison.portal.gov.bd

Department of Prison is a department of the Ministry of Home Affairs responsible for the management and security of prisons in Bangladesh and is located in Dhaka, Bangladesh. Bangladesh Jail falls under its administration which is headed by Inspector General of Prison Brigadier General Md Anwarul Kabir.

== History ==
The headquarters of the department are located in Dhaka Central Jail compound. Since November 1977, the prison departments had been headed by Armed Forces officers with the exception President Abdus Sattar in 1980.
