= Mujibur Rahman (general) =

Bangladeshi former military officer

Mujibur Rahman SBP, OSP
- মজিবুর রহমান
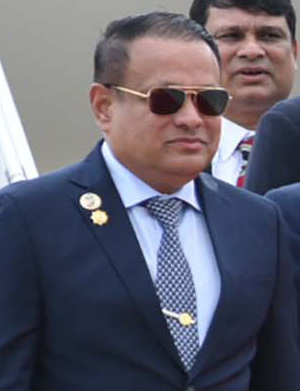
- Mujibur Rahman at Palam Airport

14th Director General of Special Security Force
- In office 6 August 2018 – 25 February 2024
- President: Abdul Hamid; Mohammed Shahabuddin
- Prime Minister: Sheikh Hasina
- Preceded by: Shafiqur Rahman
- Succeeded by: Nazmul Hasan

Personal details
- Born: 12 June 1968 (age 58) Narsingdi, East Pakistan, Pakistan
- Parent: AKM Bazlur Rahman (father)
- Awards: Senabahini Padak (SBP); Oshamanno Sheba Padak(OSP); Bangla Academy Literary Award

Military service
- Allegiance: Bangladesh
- Branch/service: Bangladesh Army; Border Guard Bangladesh
- Years of service: 1988–2024
- Rank: Lieutenant General
- Unit: Bangladesh Infantry Regiment
- Commands: GOC of ARTDOC; QMG of Army Headquarters; Director General of Special Security Force; Additional Director of the Rapid Action Battalion; Additional Director General of BGB; Commander of 46th Independent Infantry Brigade
- Battles/wars: MONUSCO; UNOSOM II; Operation Thunderbolt
- Police career
- Unit: Rapid Action Battalion
- Allegiance: Bangladesh
- Branch: Bangladesh Police
- Service years: 2010-2012
- Rank: Additional Director General

Mujibur Rahman (Note: Bengali: মজিবুর রহমান) is a former Bangladeshi military officer who was the longest serving director general of the Special Security Force. Rahman was promoted to lieutenant general and served as the quartermaster general and later commander of ARTDOC in 2024. He came to the limelight in 2016, as the commander who carried out Operation Thunderbolt during the Holey Artisan Attack He is also the recipient of Bangla Academy Literary Award 2023.

== Early life and education ==
Rahman was born on 16 June 1968 in Narsingdi District. His father, Bazlur Rahman was a freedom fighter, language movement activist, close companion of Sheikh Mujibur Rahman who Bazlur named Rahman after. Bazlur was awarded the Independence Award posthumously by the Awami League government. Rahman was commissioned with the 18th long course of the Bangladesh Military Academy in East Bengal Regiment on 24 June 1988. He graduated from the Defence Services Command and Staff College and the Defence Services Staff College, Wellington, India. Rahman furthermore attended the National University, Bangladesh and completed his master's degree in Defence and Strategic Studies from the University of Madras in India. He completed his ndc course from National Defence College, India.

== Military career ==
Rahman instructed weapon and tactical operations at the School of Infantry and Tactics. He was also the chief instructor and staff officer at Defence Services Command and Staff College, Mirpur. He commanded the 11th Bangladesh Infantry Regiment, and was a staff officer of the Directorate General of Forces Intelligence and also National Security Intelligence. Rahman also served in the Rapid Action Battalion as additional director of operations till 2012. As brigadier general, Rahman served as one of the additional director generals of the Border Guard Bangladesh and commander of 46th Independent Infantry Brigade.

In March 2012, as additional director general of RAB, Rahman led a 150-member operation against pirate gangs in the Sundarbans, in which five suspected pirates were killed in a gunfight near Sharankhola, Bagerhat District, and 11 firearms were recovered. He led a rescue operation in July 2016 in Gulshan, Dhaka where several hostages were held by Islamic State – Bengal Province. Nearly 12 hours after the attack, the operation was declared over by Rahman. The operation ended with rescue of 13 hostages and 5 terrorists were killed while the 6th one was captured alive. On 6 August 2018, Rahman was appointed as the director general of Special Security Force, succeeding major general Shafiqur Rahman.

On 25 February 2024, Rahman was upgraded to lieutenant general and was designated as quartermaster general of the army. After resignation of Sheikh Hasina, Rahman was removed from the army headquarters and transferred to army training and doctrine command. He was dismissed from the army in September 2024.

=== United Nations peacekeeping mission ===
Rahman has served under the United Nations peacekeeping force in Somalia and Congo. He served as the general staff officer of the military intelligence directorate under MONUSCO and as military observer under UNOSOM II.

== Personal life and controversies ==
Rahman is married to Tasrin Mujib. The couple has two sons and one daughter. A lot of Bangladeshi news media also cited that Rahman worked with R&AW for Indian infiltration in Bangladesh.

The Anti-corruption commission reported a substantial amount of undeclared wealth was uncovered in the names of Rahman and his wife, Tasrin Mujib. The properties allegedly include a 4,050-square-foot apartment in Mirpur with value of $200,000, an additional apartment in the government areas such as the Dhaka Cantonment and ten plots of land located across Greater Dhaka. The report further cites that Tasrin Mujib solely owns additional apartment near Baridhara and also seven plots of land in Uttar Khan Thana, including a land valued at more than $100,000. Investigators also reported the existence of 15 bank accounts linked to the couple, through which large financial transactions were allegedly conducted. The commission claims these funds were derived from bribes and illicit income obtained through abuse of power during Rahman's period in military service. As a result, the commission petitioned the court to seize the properties and freeze the associated bank accounts.
