= Drugs Control Act, 1950 =

Drugs (Control) Act, 1950

Parliament of India
- Long title: An Act to provide for the control of the sale, supply and distribution of drugs.
- Citation: 26 of 1950
- Territorial extent: India
- Enacted: 7 April 1950

Repeals
- The Drugs (Control) Ordinance, 1949 (XXVI of 1949)

Amended by
- Delegated Legislation Provisions (Amendment) Act, 2004 (4 of 2005); Repealing and Amending Act, 2016 (23 of 2016)
- Status: In force (amended)

The Drugs Control Act, 1950 (Act 26 of 1950) is an Act of the Parliament of India which regulates the pricing of drugs. It allows the government to fix the maximum price of any drug.

== Summary ==
The Act allows the Government of India to control the sales, supply and distribution of any drug in India. The government can set maximum selling price, and impose various restriction on sale, including the maximum quantity to be possessed by a dealer and the maximum quantity to be sold to one person.

The Act requires a retailer to give a cash memorandum to the customer for any purchase above ₹5, and in case the purchase is below ₹5 the retailer must give a memo if the customer demands.

The violation of the Act carries a maximum of 3 years with or without fine. In case of corporate violators, every director, manager, secretary, agent or other officer or person concerned with the management may be prosecuted unless he/she the offence occurred without his/her knowledge. The investigating officer must have the rank of Inspector in the police.

== See also ==
- Drug policy of India
- List of acts of the Parliament of India
