= Sheikh Mohammad Aman Hasan =

Bangladeshi military officer

12th Director General of Special Security Force
- In office 10 October 2012 – 10 April 2016
- President: Zillur Rahman; Abdul Hamid
- Prime Minister: Sheikh Hasina
- Preceded by: Chowdhury Hasan Sarwardy
- Succeeded by: Shafiqur Rahman

Personal details
- Born: April 15, 1960 (age 66) Lohagara, East Pakistan, Pakistan
- Awards: Independence Day Award

Military service
- Allegiance: Bangladesh
- Branch/service: Bangladesh Army; Border Guard Bangladesh
- Years of service: 1980-2016
- Rank: Major General
- Unit: East Bengal Regiment
- Commands: DG of Special Security Force; President of Inter Services Selection Board; Commander of President Guard Regiment
- Battles/wars: UNOSOM II; MONUSCO

Sheikh Mohammad Aman Hasan is a retired major general of the Bangladesh Army who served as director general of the Special Security Force under Prime Minister Sheikh Hasina. Earlier, he served as commandant in President Guard Regiment (PGR).

== Early life and education ==
Hasan was born on 15 April 1960 to a Bengali family of Muslim Sheikhs in Lohagara thana, Narail, then part of the Jessore District of East Pakistan (now Bangladesh). He completed his SSC and HSC from Jhenaidah Cadet College. He is a very close friend of former prime minister Sheikh Hasina's cousin and former member of parliament Sheikh Helal; they studied together at Jhenaidah Cadet College. He joined the Bangladesh Military Academy in 1979 and was commissioned in the 8th East Bengal Regiment in 1980. Aman is a graduate of the National Defence University, China.

== Career ==
Hasan served for a time as ADC to President Mohammad Ershad in 1986-1988. He commanded two infantry battalions, two intelligence units, and two border guard battalions and as a sector commander in BDR. He also served as deputy president in Inter Service Selection Board (ISSB). He served under blue helmet as a military observer in the DR Congo and as a peacekeeper in Somalia. On 10 October 2012, he joined SSF as its director general by replacing Chowdhury Hasan Sarwardy.

== Personal life ==
Hasan is married to Sohela Akter Shayamoli, and the couple has two children.
