= Shimanto Bank =

Bangladeshi Bank

Shimanto Bank PLC.
- Type: Private commercial bank
- Industry: Banking
- Founded: Dhaka, Bangladesh
- Headquarters: Dhaka, Bangladesh
- Key people: Major General Mohammad Ashrafuzzaman Siddiqui (Chairman); Rafiqul Islam (Managing Director & CEO)
- Products: Banking services Consumer Banking; Corporate Banking; Investment Banking
- Net income: ▲
- Parent: BGB Welfare Trust Bangladesh
- Website: www.shimantobank.com

Shimanto Bank PLC. is a schedule commercial bank in Bangladesh and related to the Border Guards Bangladesh. As the slogan goes "Shimahin Astha", Shimanto Bank Limited aims to be the leading financial institution to serve with utmost trust. Rafiqul Islam is the chief executive officer and managing director of the bank. Major General Mohammad Ashrafuzzaman Siddiqui, director general of Border Guards Bangladesh, is the chairman of the bank.

== History ==
The bank was established on 21 July 2016 through an act of parliament and planned by Prime Minister Sheikh Hasina. Maj General Aziz Ahmed was the founder chairman, Brigadier General Taufiqul Hasan Siddiquee was the project director, and Moklesur Rahman appointed as the first managing director and CEO of the bank. The bank was designed to provided financial services to the marginalized population of the country as well as active and retired personals of Border Guards Bangladesh.

On 1 August 2016, Muklesur Rahman was appointed the chief executive officer and managing director of the bank. Prime Minister Sheikh Hasina inaugurates Shimanto Bank formally on 1 September 2016. Founder chairman inaugurated the principal branch on 10 October 2016. The director general of the Border Guards is the ex-officio chairman of the bank. Major General Aziz Ahmed was the first chairman of the Bank and he was replaced by Major General Abul Hossain on 2 November 2016.

In 2020, Shimanto Bank had 12.09 billion taka in deposits.

In August 2021, Bangladesh Bank issued a show cause notice to Shimanto Bank PLC and nine other banks for having a low interest rate on their deposits. As of July 2025, Shimanto Bank PLC has 27 branches, 8 sub-branches and 34 ATM booths. In August 2022, Rafiqul Islam was appointed the chief executive officer and managing director of the bank Bangladesh Securities and Exchange Commission has asked Shimanto Bank to make preparations for an initial public offering.

== Board of directors ==
Name	Position	Reference
Major General Mohammad Ashrafuzzaman Siddiqui	Chairman	
Brigadier General Md Nurul Amin	Director	
Brigadier General Md Shazedur Rahman	Director	
Brigadier General Ali Reza Mohammad Ashaduzzaman	Director	
Brigadier General Benazir Ahmed	Director	
Brigadier General A. M. M. Khairul Kabir	Director	
Colonel Murad Zaman	Director	
Colonel A. S. M. Faisal	Director	
Colonel Shafiul Azam Parvez	Director	
Rafiqul Islam	Managing Director	

== See also ==
- Community Bank Bangladesh, managed by Bangladesh Police
- Trust Bank Limited, managed by Bangladesh Army
- Ansar-VDP Unnayan Bank, managed by Bangladesh Ansar and the Village Defence Party
- Bangladesh Rifles mutiny
