= Bangladesh Fire Service & Civil Defence =

National fire and rescue department of Bangladesh

- বাংলাদেশ ফায়ার সার্ভিস ও সিভিল ডিফেন্স
- Emblem of Bangladesh Fire Service & Civil Defence

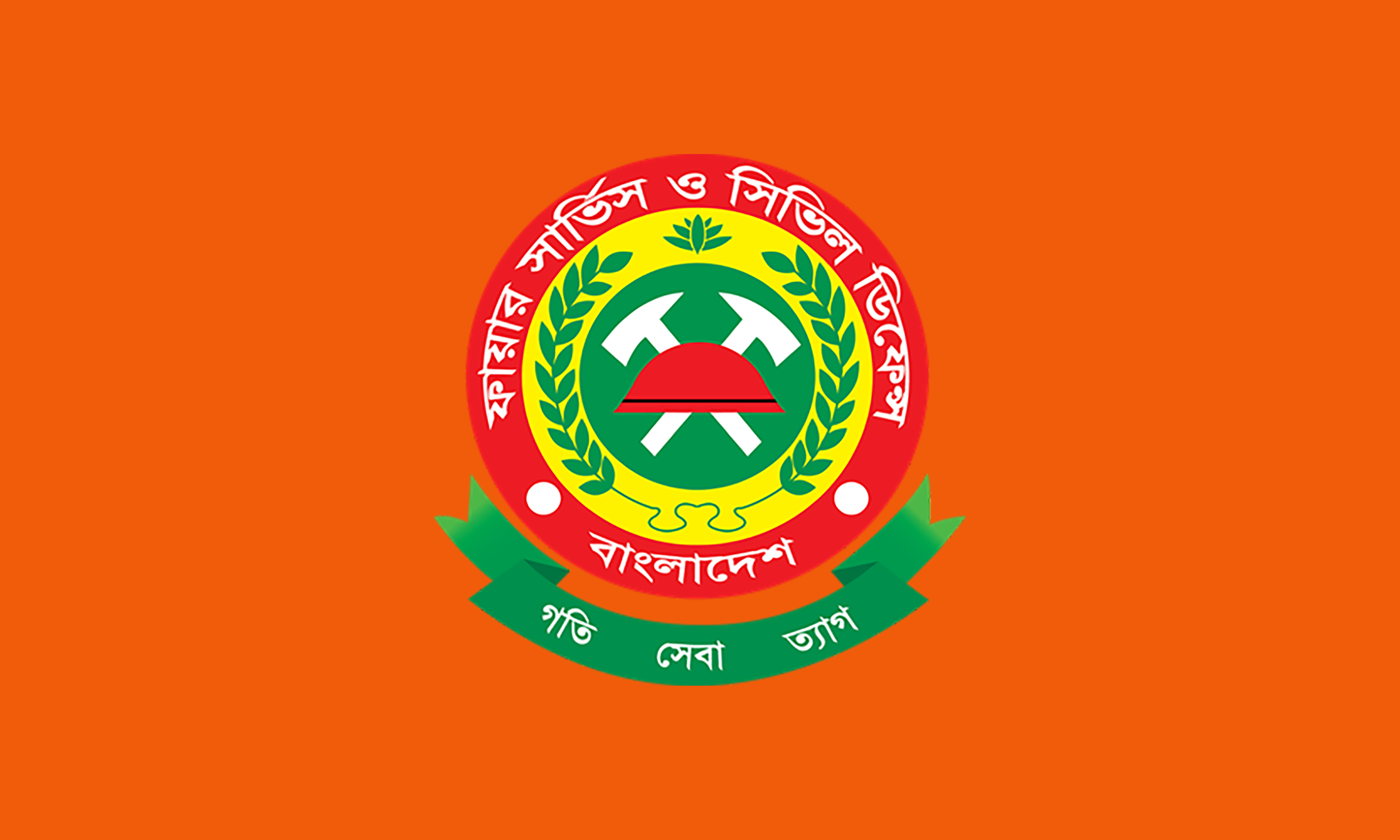
- Flag of Bangladesh Fire Service & Civil Defence

Operational area
- Country: Bangladesh
- Address: 38-46, Kazi Alauddin Road, Fulbaria, Dhaka—1000
- Coordinates: 23.7224°N 90.4062°E

Agency overview
- Established: April 9, 1981; 45 years ago
- Annual calls: Total emergency responses in 2024: Fire incidents: 26,659; Underwater rescue and recovery operations: 1,215; Animal rescue operations: 544; Ambulance patient transport calls: 11,820
- Employees: 14,570
- Annual budget: ৳1034 crore (US$84 million) (FY 2026–27)
- Staffing: Career
- Director General: Brigadier General Sultanul Afreen Junaid
- Director (Operations and Maintenance): Lieutenant Colonel Md Mahmudul Hasan
- Director (Training, Planning & Development): Lieutenant Colonel M A Azad Anwar
- Motto: "Speed, Service, Sacrifice"

Facilities and equipment
- Divisions: 8
- Stations: 538
- Engines: 593
- Ladders: 17
- Rescues: 36
- Ambulances: 195
- Tenders: 99
- HAZMAT: 6
- Fireboats: 7
- Rescue boats: 38
- Light and air: 6
- Aerial Ladder Platforms: 13

Website
- fireservice.gov.bd

The Bangladesh Fire Service & Civil Defence (FSCD) (Bengali: বাংলাদেশ ফায়ার সার্ভিস ও সিভিল ডিফেন্স, romanized: Bānlādeś Phāẏār Sārvis ō Sivil Ḍiphēns) is the national emergency service agency responsible for firefighting, rescue operations, and civil defense in Bangladesh. It operates under the Ministry of Home Affairs. The FSCD provides emergency response services and disaster preparedness activities across the country, including firefighting, rescue operations, and public training and awareness efforts aimed at reducing fire and disaster risks. The agency is tasked with protecting lives, property, and public safety from fires, natural disasters, and other emergencies.

== Organisation ==
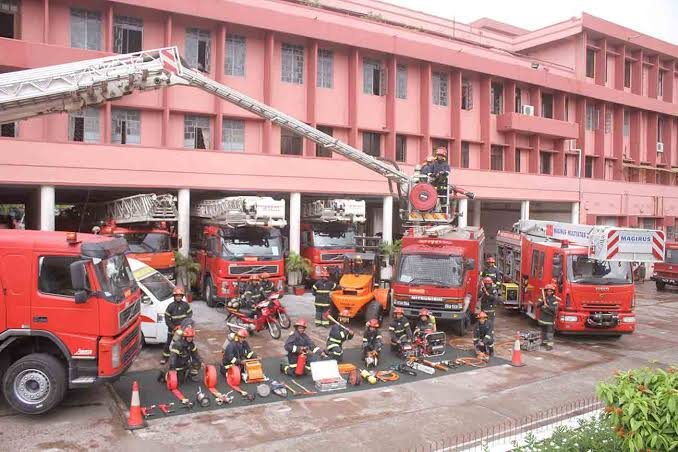
Firefighters at work in front of the Bangladesh Fire Service & Civil Defence Headquarters building

The Bangladesh Fire Service and Civil Defence (FSCD) operates through multiple specialized departments, including Operations, Maintenance, Training, Planning and Development, Administration, and Finance. These departments work in coordination to ensure the effective delivery of emergency response services, fire prevention, disaster preparedness, and technical rescue operations across the country.

In addition to its professional personnel, the FSCD benefits from a robust network of civilian volunteers who support response efforts during disasters and emergencies. As part of its target to prepare 60,000 volunteers, 44,612 individuals had received training as of 2021. More broadly, over 678,000 people have been trained in firefighting and disaster management through 16,966 civilian training courses.

The FSCD is led by a director general. As of 2021, the leadership hierarchy comprises 3 directors, 14 deputy directors, 29 assistant directors, and 77 deputy assistant directors.

=== Operation ===
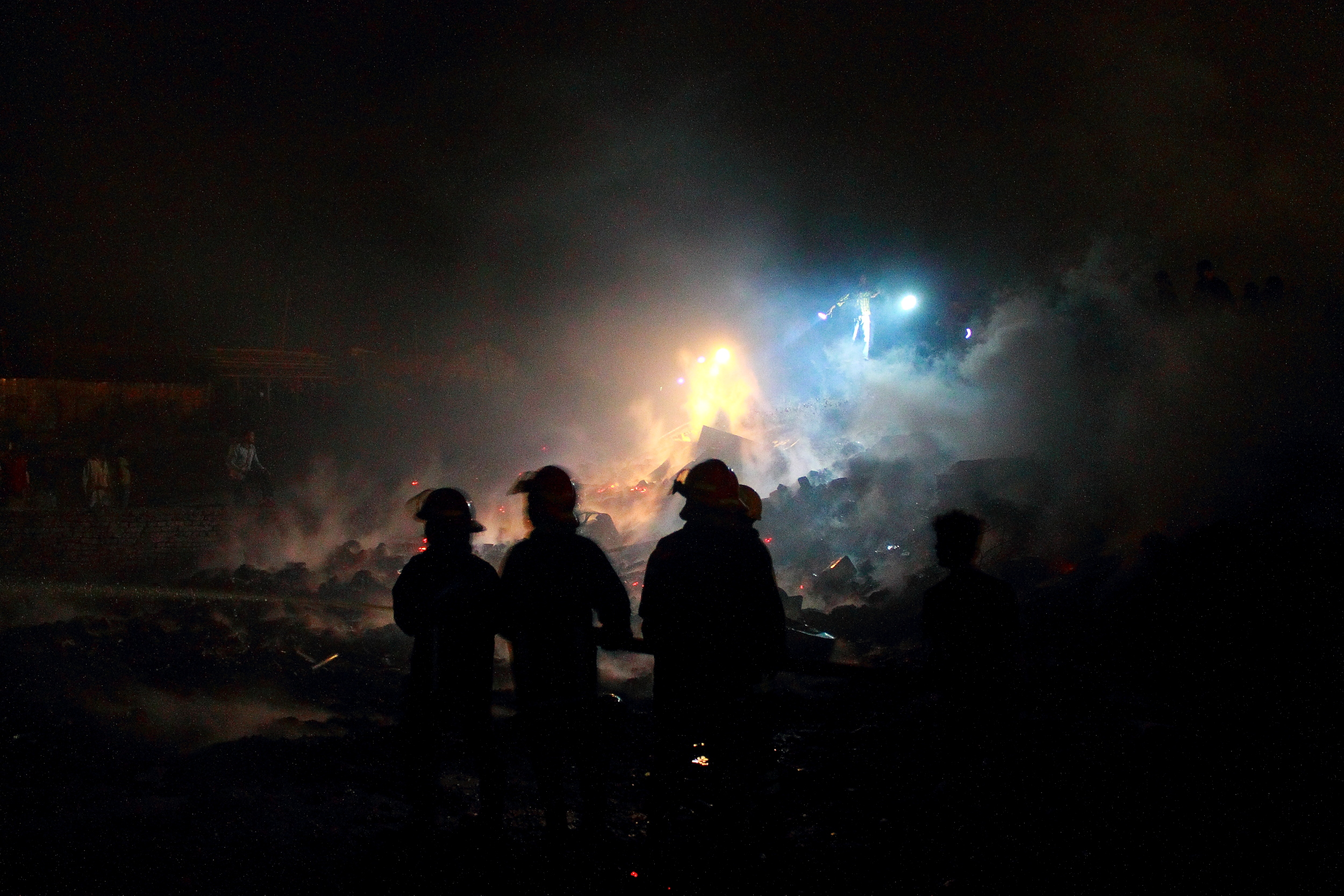
Firefighters in action

The Bangladesh Fire Service and Civil Defence (FSCD) undertakes a comprehensive range of emergency response and safety operations across the country. Its core responsibility is fire suppression, with teams trained to quickly respond to fires in urban areas, airports, seaports, and rural communities. Alongside firefighting, the FSCD performs technical rescues and hazardous materials mitigation to effectively manage incidents involving dangerous substances and complex rescue scenarios.

Beyond emergency firefighting, the FSCD actively promotes fire prevention through systematic inspections of buildings and facilities to ensure compliance with safety regulations. It enforces hazardous materials safety protocols and provides fire protection management guidance to reduce risks. The department also conducts thorough investigations into the causes of fires to prevent future incidents.

Although Bangladesh lacks designated organization for Emergency medical service , similar operations are integrated into FSCD's operations, including first-aid education and training for personnel, as well as emergency telephone consultation services to offer immediate medical advice to the public during crises.

=== Disaster response initiatives ===
In May 2025, the FSCD enhanced its disaster readiness by forming a specialized earthquake response unit in Dhaka, consisting of 60 trained members equipped for rapid deployment during seismic emergencies. Additional 20-member teams are being organized in divisional cities, further strengthening nationwide preparedness. The department also plans to relocate its operational division to Mirpur, Dhaka, to improve response coordination and efficiency.

=== Swift Water Rescue Training ===
In May 2025, 15 personnel from the Bangladesh Fire Service and Civil Defence successfully completed a four-day Swift Water Rescue Training course in Cox's Bazar. Organized by the U.S. Embassy in Dhaka, the training aimed to equip participants with the skills to rescue individuals during tidal surges, flash floods, and other water-related emergencies. Practical sessions were conducted at Inani Beach and other coastal locations in Cox's Bazar, as well as in controlled environments such as swimming pools. This initiative is part of ongoing efforts to enhance Bangladesh's disaster response capabilities, particularly in the context of increasingly frequent climate-induced emergencies.

=== Fire stations ===
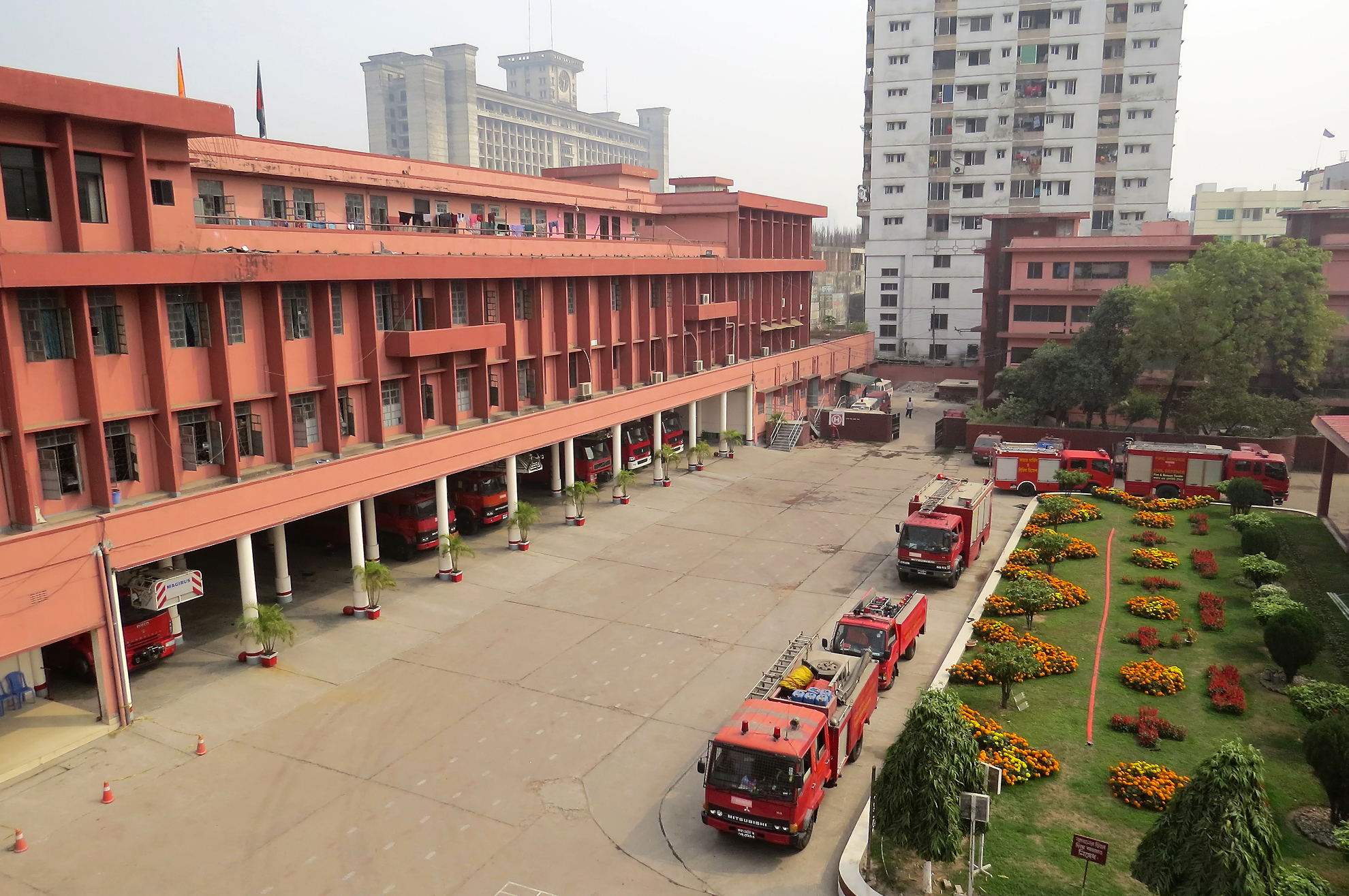
Bangladesh Fire Service & Civil Defence Headquarters

The department operates 538 fire stations throughout the country.

- 10 special category stations
- 95 A-category stations
- 314 B-category stations
- 8 B-category land-and-river stations
- 100 C-category stations
- 11 river fire stations

According to a 2016 report, a first-class fire station was equipped with 35 firemen, an ambulance, water tenders, water pumps and 200 volunteers. The distribution of fire stations by administrative division is as follows:

Fire stations by division
Administrative division	Number of stations
Dhaka	126
Chattogram	104
Rajshahi	73
Khulna	63
Barishal	42
Sylhet	38
Rangpur	59
Mymensingh	33
Total	538

=== Rank structure ===
- Director General - Brig Gen
- Director
- Deputy Director/Principal
- Assistant Director/Vice Principal/Assistant Maintenance Engineer
- Deputy Assistant Director/Adjutant/Instructor/Foreman/Senior Staff Officer/Mechanical Transport Officer
- Senior Station Officer/Assistant Instructor/Officer-In-Charge/Store Officer
- Warehouse Inspector
- Station Officer/Staff Officer/Junior Instructor/Mobilizing Officer
- Sub Officer
- Leader
- Firefighter/Nursing attendant/Diver
- Driver

== History ==
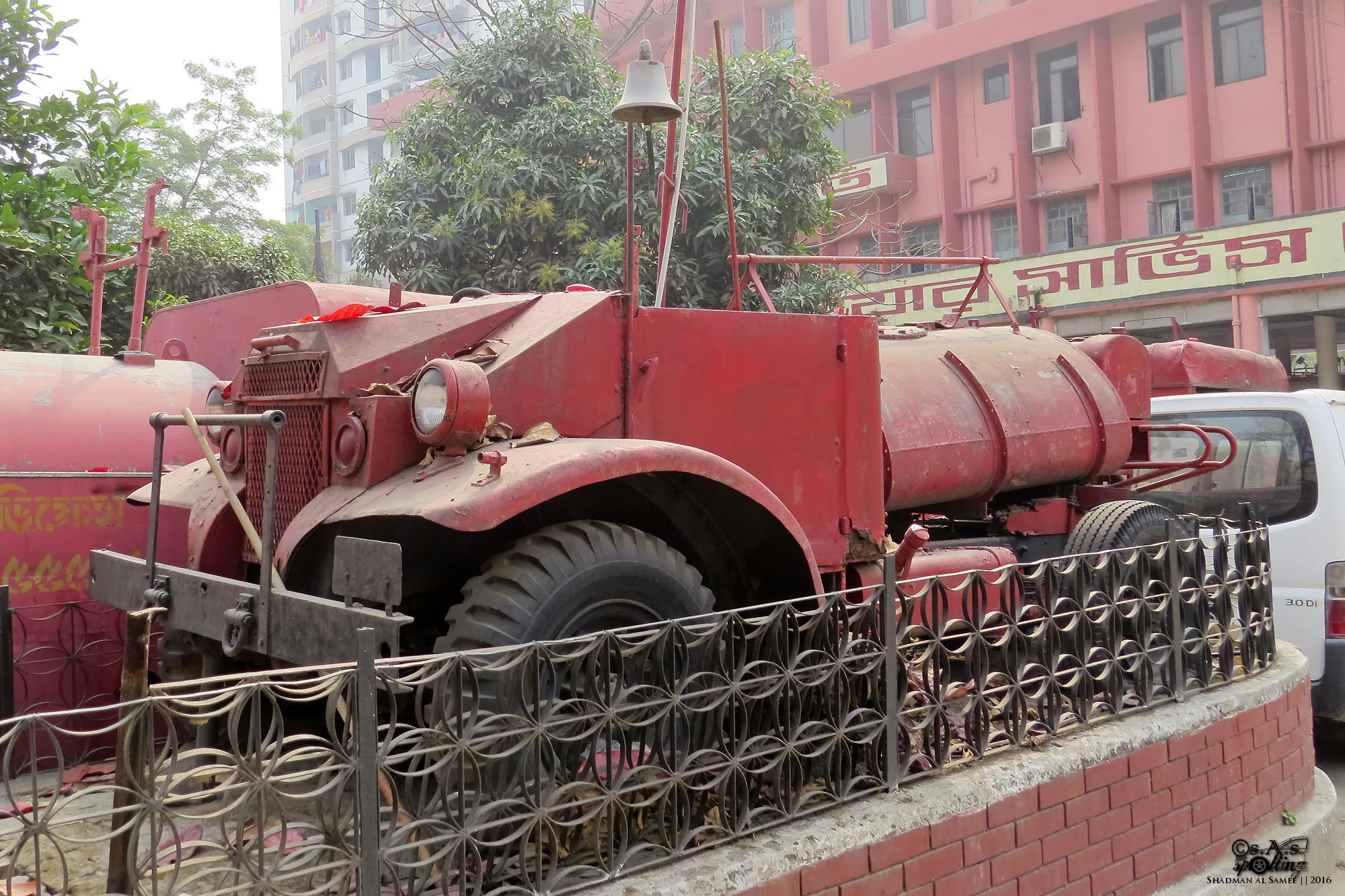
A CMP Ford F15 with No. 11 cab possibly the first unit of the service

The then British government created the Fire Service in 1939–40 in undivided India. During the Partition, the Calcutta Fire Service was created for the city of Calcutta at the regional level, and the Bengal Fire Service for undivided Bengal. In 1947, the fire service in the region was renamed the East Pakistan Fire Service.

During World War II, the Department of Civil Defence in India was initially created with Air Raid Precautions (ARP) at an early stage and the Department of Civil Defence at a later stage in 1951 through a legal process. For the purpose of work management, a Rescue Department was created under the Roads and Highways Department.

On 9 April 1981, the then Fire Service Directorate and the Civil Defence Department merged to form the Department of Fire Service and Civil Defence. Later, the Rescue Department was included in the Department of Fire Service & Civil Defence.

== Fire incidents and statistics ==
The Bangladesh Fire Service and Civil Defence responds to thousands of fire-related emergencies annually. The table below summarizes reported fire incidents from 2015 to 2024:

Year	Number of Fires
2024	26,659
2023	27,624
2022	24,102
2021	21,601
2020	21,073
2019	24,074
2018	19,642
2017	18,105
2016	16,858
2015	17,488

== Equipment ==
Bangladesh Fire Service and Civil Defence Vehicles
Image	Vehicle	Type	Country of origin
Isuzu NPR fire tender	Isuzu NPR Fire Tender	Fire Tender	Japan
Isuzu Fire Fighting and Medium Rescue Truck	Isuzu Fire Fighting and Medium Rescue Truck	Fire Tender/Rescue	Japan
SPV-SinoTruk 320 water tender	SPV-SinoTruk 320 Water Tender	Water Tender	China
Isuzu FTR Chemical Tender	Isuzu FTR Chemical Tender	Chemical Tender	Japan
SPV-SinoTruk 220 foam tender	SPV-SinoTruk 220 Foam Tender	Foam Tender	China
Magirus MultiStar 2	Magirus MultiStar 2	Aerial Platform (Telescopic Boom)	Germany Italy
Morita-Scania P360	Morita-Scania P360	Turntable Ladder	Japan Sweden
Kingstar Neptune L6 Ambulance	Kingstar Neptune L6 Ambulance	Ambulance	China
Mitsubishi L200 pickup	Mitsubishi L200 pickup	Pickup Truck	Japan
Foton Tunland pickup	Foton Tunland Pickup	Pickup Truck	China
	LUF 60	Remote-controlled unmanned ground vehicle (UGV)	Austria
	Firefighting motorcycle	Firefighting Motorcycle	China
