= Department of Narcotics Control =

Government agency in Bangladesh

- মাদকদ্রব্য নিয়ন্ত্রণ অধিদপ্তর
- Official Seal of Department of Narcotics Control

Department overview
- Formed: 2 January 1990; 36 years ago
- Jurisdiction: Government of Bangladesh
- Headquarters: Segunbagicha, Shahbagh Thana, Dhaka
- Annual budget: ৳498 crore (US$41 million) 2026-2027
- Department executive: Md. Abdus Sabur Mondal, Director General
- Parent Department: Ministry of Home Affairs
- Website: Department of Narcotics Control

Department of Narcotics Control (Bengali: মাদকদ্রব্য নিয়ন্ত্রণ অধিদপ্তর, romanized: Mādakadrabya niẏantraṇa adhidaptara) is a government department under the Ministry of Home Affairs responsible for preventing drug abuse, combating narcotics trafficking, enforcing narcotics laws, and regulating controlled substances in Bangladesh.

== History ==
The Department of Narcotics Control was established on 2 January 1990 under the Ministry of Home Affairs and is related to National Narcotics Control Board. The agency is responsible for issuing licenses for the import, exports, sales, transport, etc. for drugs in Bangladesh. It also carries out raids against illegal narcotics. The department has its own intelligence branch.

Prior to its establishment, drugs including but not limited to codeine-laced cough syrup, some alcoholic health tonics, tablets, and syrups were banned from being marketed and produced in 1982, then in 1984 opium (which has a long history in both Bangladesh and its neighbor India) was banned, in 1987 the cultivation of cannabis was stopped and finally in 1989 all cannabis shops were closed.

On 9 September 1991 the department was placed under the Ministry of Home Affairs.

Md. Hasan Maruf is the Director-General of the Department of Narcotics Control.
