= Department of Immigration & Passports =

Bangladesh government ministry department

- ইমিগ্রেশন ও পাসপোর্ট অধিদপ্তর
- Official Seal of Department of Immigration & Passports

Department overview
- Formed: 1973; 53 years ago
- Jurisdiction: Government of Bangladesh
- Headquarters: Dhaka, Bangladesh
- Annual budget: Allocated by Government
- Department executive: Major General Md Alimul Amin, Director General
- Parent department: Ministry of Home Affairs
- Website: https://dip.gov.bd/

The Department of Immigration & Passports of the Ministry of Home Affairs is the government organisation responsible for passports, immigration and migration in general in Bangladesh. It is located in Dhaka, the capital city of Bangladesh. The headquarters is located in Agargaon Passport office in Dhaka City. Major General Md Alimul Amin is the incumbent Director General (DG) of the Department of Immigration and Passports.

== History ==
The department was established in 1973 by the government of Bangladesh after the Bangladesh Liberation war in 1971. In 2017 the department started making a biometric list of Rohingya Refugees in Bangladesh.
