= Commission of Inquiry on Enforced Disappearances =

Commission to investigate enforced disappearances in Bangladesh

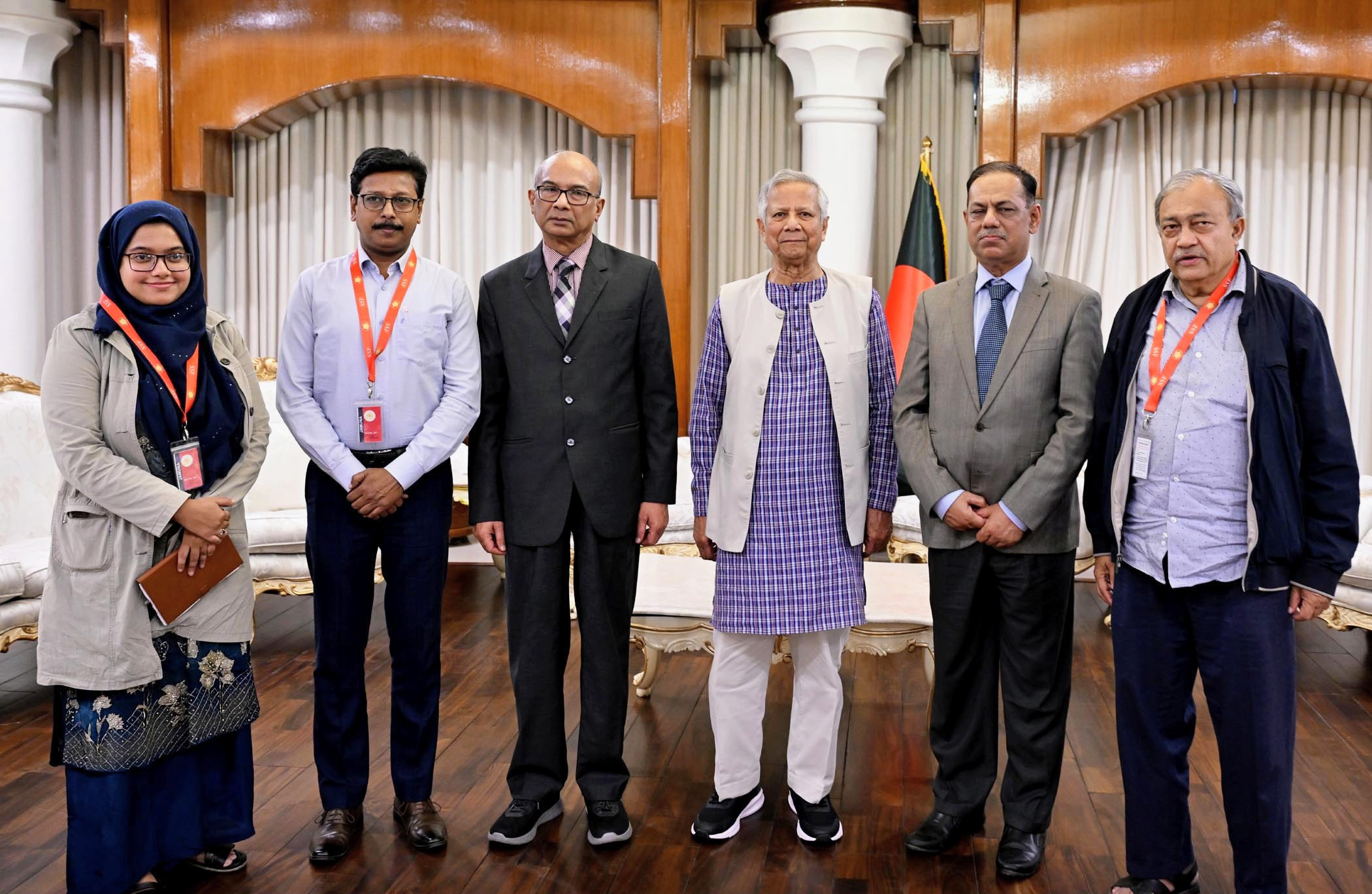
Members of Commission of Inquiry on Enforced Disappearances with Muhammad Yunus.

The Commission of Inquiry on Enforced Disappearances (Bengali:গুম সংক্রান্ত তদন্ত কমিশন), consisting of five members, was formed on 27 August 2024 by the Interim Government of Bangladesh to investigate cases of enforced disappearances that occurred during the tenure of the ousted Prime Minister Sheikh Hasina. Moyeenul Islam Chowdhury, a retired Justice of the High Court Division of the Bangladesh Supreme Court, serves as the chairman of the commission. The other four members include a former judge, a university teacher, and two human rights activists. The commission was established under the Commissions of Inquiry Act, 1956.

== Members ==
Position	Name	Background
Chairman	Moyeenul Islam Chowdhury	Retired judge of High Court Division of the Bangladesh Supreme Court
Member	Farid Ahmed Shibli	Retired judge of High Court Division of the Bangladesh Supreme Court
Member	Nur Khan Liton	Human rights activist
Member	Md. Sazzad Hussain	Human rights activist
Member	Nabila Idris	Faculty member of BRAC University
