= Ministry of Home Affairs (Bangladesh) =

Government ministry of Bangladesh

- স্বরাষ্ট্র মন্ত্রণালয়
- Government Seal of Bangladesh

Ministry overview
- Formed: 14 April 1971; 55 years ago
- Jurisdiction: Government of Bangladesh
- Headquarters: Building No. 8, Bangladesh Secretariat, Dhaka
- Annual budget: ৳31099 crore (US$2.5 billion) (2026-2027)
- Minister responsible: Salahuddin Ahmed, Minister of Home Affairs
- Ministry executive: Manjur Morshed Chowdhury, Senior Secretary
- Child agencies: Bangladesh Police Border Guards Bangladesh Bangladesh Ansar & VDP Bangladesh Coast Guard National Telecommunication Monitoring Centre, Bangladesh Fire Service & Civil Defence Department of Immigration & Passports Department of Prisons Department of Narcotics Control
- Website: moha.gov.bd

The Ministry of Home Affairs (Bengali: স্বরাষ্ট্র মন্ত্রণালয়, romanized: Swôrāstrô Montronaloy) is a ministry of the Government of Bangladesh responsible for internal security, law enforcement, and domestic policy. It serves as the country's principal interior ministry and oversees key law enforcement, paramilitary, and intelligence agencies. The ministry is also responsible for public safety and policing, border security, immigration, the issuance of passports, and civil registration.

== Senior officials ==
=== Ministerial team ===
The ministerial team at the MHA (https://moha.gov.bd) is headed by the Minister of Home Affairs, who is assigned to them to manage the ministers office and ministry.

- Minister — Salahuddin Ahmed

=== Home Secretary and other senior officials ===
The ministers are supported by a number of civilian, scientific and professional advisors. The Home Secretary is the senior civil servant at the MHA. His/Her role is to ensure the MHA operates effectively as a department of the government.

- Senior Secretary — Manjur Morshed Chowdhury

== Departments and agencies ==
- Bangladesh Police
- Border Guard Bangladesh

Matters relating to coordination by administrative, diplomatic, security, intelligence, legal, regulatory and economic agencies of the country for the management of international borders, infrastructure development like roads/fencing and floodlighting of borders, border areas development programme pilot project on Multi-purpose National Identity Card

- Bangladesh Coast Guard

Dealing with management of coastal borders

- Bangladesh Ansar and Village Defence Party

Dealing with management assistance of law and order along with other enforcement agencies. Village Defence Party works for the village law and order along with socio-economic development

- Department of Narcotics Control

Controls the Illegal trafficking, use and consumption of narcotic Drugs.

- Department of Immigration & Passport
- Department of Fire Service & Civil Defence
- Department of Prisons
  - Bangladesh Prisons
- National Identity Registration Wing

== See also ==
- Minister of Home Affairs (Bangladesh)
