= Ayesha Ferdaus =

Bangladeshi politician

- আয়েশা ফেরদৌস

Member of the Bangladesh Parliament for Noakhali-6
- In office 2014–2023
- Preceded by: Mohammad Fazlul Azim
- Succeeded by: Abdul Hannan Masud

Personal details
- Born: 7 April 1961 (age 65) Noakhali
- Party: Bangladesh Awami League
- Spouse: Mohammad Ali
- Committees: Standing Committee on the Ministry of Social Welfare

Ayesha Ferdaus is a Bangladesh Awami League politician and former member of parliament from Noakhali-6.

== Biography ==
Ayesha Ferdaus completed her education up to the undergraduate level. A business woman, she competed as an independent candidate in the 2009 Bangladesh general election. She lost to Mohammad Fazlul Azim, another independent candidate. She challenged his victory in the Bangladesh High Court in 2011. She was nominated from Noakhali-6 constituency which falls into the Hatiya Upazila of Noakhali District in 2014 Bangladesh general election as a candidate of the Bangladesh Awami League. She was nominated after her husband, Mohammad Ali, was declared by the Bangladesh Election Commission returning officer as being unfit for office and as a result could not be nominated.

In 2017, Ayesha Ferdaus was helping the government of Bangladesh relocate the Rohingya Refugees in Bangladesh to Bhasan Char, Noakhali District. According to her, the government will build the required facilities and services to house the Rohingyas in the island. She is a member of the parliamentary standing committee on the Ministry of Social Welfare.

Ferdaus, her husband Mohammad Ali, and their son, Ashiq Ali, chairman of Hatiya upazila parishad, were detained by Bangladesh Navy in August 2024. In April 2025, a travel ban was imposed on her, her husband, and their three children.

== Personal life ==
Her husband, Mohammad Ali, is a former member of parliament. A case was filed against her husband after Jubo League leader Riaz Uddin was killed during the Awami League fractional clashes on 30 August 2017.
