= Hatiya Upazila =

Hatiya হাতিয়া
- Upazila
- Hatiya
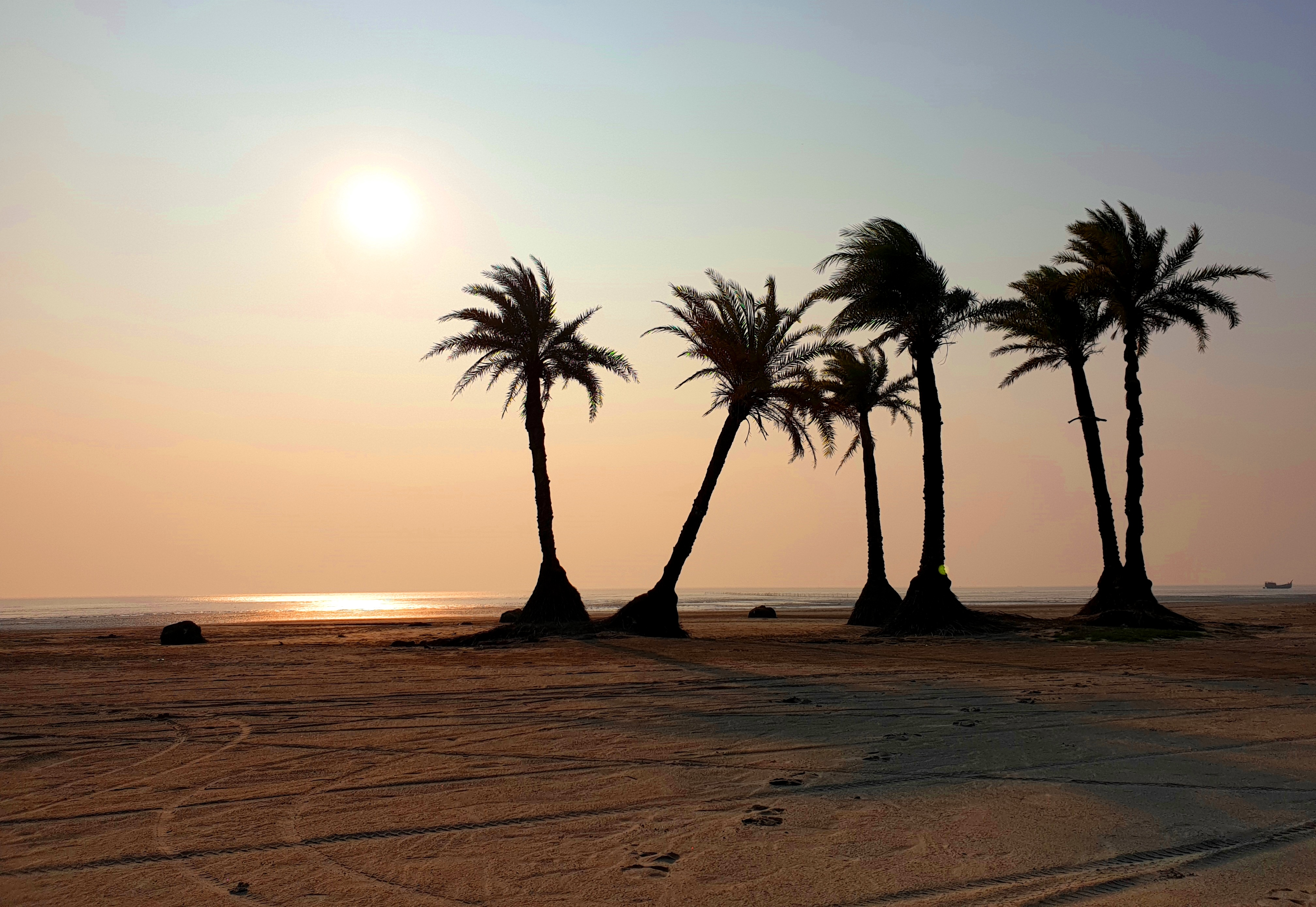
- Sunset on Nijhum Dwip, south of Hatiya Island

- Coordinates: 22°22′N 91°7.5′E
- Country: Bangladesh
- Division: Chittagong
- District: Noakhali
- Jatiya Sangsad constituency: Noakhali-6
- Headquarters: Hatiya Upazila Complex

Government
  - Body: Upazila Council
  - MP: Abdul Hannan Masud
  - Chairman: Vacant

Area
  - Upazila: 1,507.35 km^{2} (581.99 sq mi)
  - Metro: 888.035 km^{2} (342.872 sq mi)

Population (2022)
  - Upazila: 537,366
  - Density: 356.497/km^{2} (923.323/sq mi)
- Time zone: UTC+6 (BST)
- Postal code: 3890
- Area code: 03224
- Website: hatia.noakhali.gov.bd

Hatiya Upazila mauza geocode map

Hatiya (Bengali: হাতিয়া) is an upazila (sub-district) of Noakhali District in Bangladesh's Chittagong Division. It encompasses of a small archipelago in southeastern Noakhali, most notably Hatiya Island, Nijhum Dwip, Domar Char, Kolatoli Char, Bhasan Char and Swarna Dweep.

== History ==
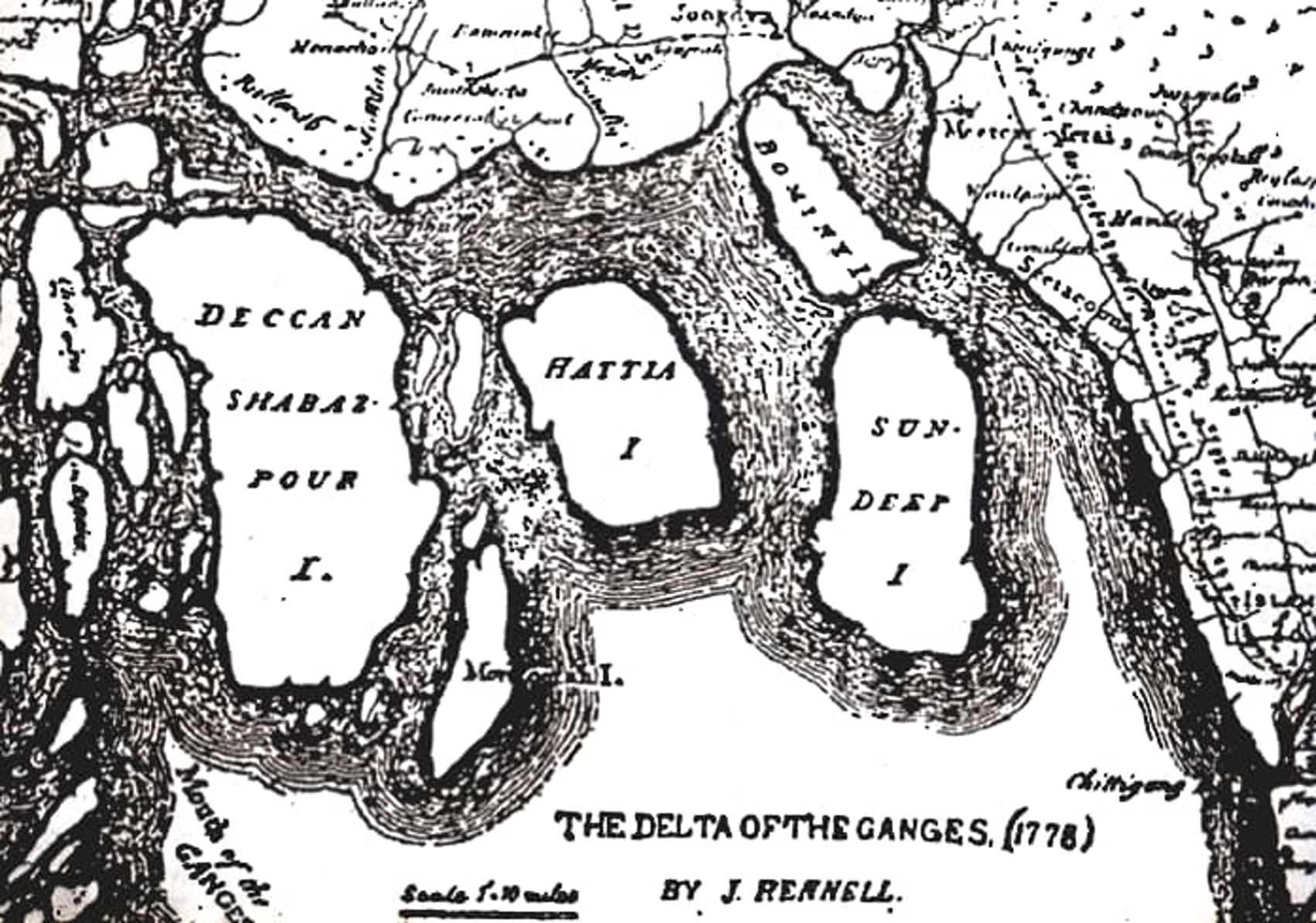
Hatiya Island in 1778 in a map by James Rennell

The Hatiya thana was established with Hatiya Island as its largest and principal island. In 1983, Hatiya Thana was upgraded to an upazila (sub-district) as part of the President of Bangladesh Hussain Muhammad Ershad's decentralisation programme.

== Power House ==
Hatia-Nijhum Island is being illuminated with electricity at a cost of Tk 400 crore. After 50 years, 30,000 customers are being connected to electricity services in the form of 15 MW power plants. It is learned that the cost of this project will be 364 crore 36 lakh 15 thousand taka.

== Geography ==
Hatiya Upazila is located at 22.3667°N 91.1250°E. It has 47,970 household units and a total area of 2,100 square kilometres. It is bounded by the Subarnachar Upazila to its north, Ramgati Upazila to its northwest, the Bay of Bengal to the east and south, and Manpura Upazila to its west.

== Demographics ==
Religions in Hatiya Upazila (2022)
Religion	Percent
Islam	94.99%
Hinduism	5.00%
Other or not stated	0.01%

According to the 2022 Bangladeshi census, Hatiya Upazila had 112,032 households and a population of 537,366. 13.82% of the population were under 5 years of age. Hatiya had a literacy rate (age 7 and over) of 64.40%: 64.66% for males and 64.14% for females, and a sex ratio of 104.04 males for every 100 females. 110,126 (20.49%) lived in urban areas.

According to the 2011 Census of Bangladesh, Hatiya Upazila had 91,013 households and a population of 452,463. 144,508 (31.94%) were under 10 years of age. Hatiya had a literacy rate (age 7 and over) of 34.21%, compared to the national average of 51.8%, and a sex ratio of 1021 females per 1000 males. 86,514 (19.12%) lived in urban areas.

== Economy ==
The upazila consists of 52 markets and bazaars. They include Oskhali, Afazia, Tamruddi, Chowmuhani, Sagaria, Jahajmara, Sonadia chowrasta, Char Chenga, Maijdee Bazar and Nalchira Bazar. Most people are employed in agriculture and fishing, and a few professions are government or non-governmental jobs. All banks are run by the government including Krishi Bank, Sonali Bank Limited, and Janata Bank Limited.

The main exports include rice, coconut, betel nut, banana, betel leaf, chili, Hilsa, and other types of fish.

== Administration ==
Hatiya Upazila is divided into one Municipality, the Hatiya Municipality, and 11 Union parishads:

1. Burir Char
2. Chandnandi
3. Char Ishwar
4. Char King
5. Harni
6. Jahajmara
7. Nijhum Dwip
8. Nolchira
9. Sonadiya
10. Sukhchar
11. Tamaraddi

The union parishads are subdivided into 44 mauzas and 62 villages. Hatiya Upazila is represented as the Noakhali-6 constituency in the Jatiya Sangsad.

=== Chairmen ===
List of chairmen
Name	Notes
Mahadi Hasan (Present- Sonadiya Union)
Professor Muhammad Waliullah
Muhammad Mahbub Murshid Liton	Present

== Healthcare ==
There is one Upazila Health Complex and 10 family planning centres. Notable NGOs operating in this area are Grameeen bank, Dwip Unnoyan Songstha, Brac, Proshika, Heed Bangladesh, CARE, and Caritas. There is also some private diagnostic center with Hatiya Doctor's Lab (Founder-Dr.Md.Iqbal Ansari – 1995)

== Education ==
Institutions of higher education include Hatiya Dwip Government College and three non-governmental colleges. Some of the schools include:

- Hatiya Darul Uloom Kamil Madrasa
- Sukhchar Azharul Uloom Fazil Madrasa
- Hatiya Rahmania Fazil Madrasa
- Char Renga Islamia Fazil Madrasa
- Char Kailas Hadia Fazil Madrasa
- Tamruddin Ahmadia Fazil Madrasa
- Jahazmara Sirajul Uloom Alia Madrasa
- Chowmuhani Tabarakia Alim Madrasa
- Burir Char Ahmadia Alim Madrasa
- Char King Muhammadia Dakhil Madrasa
- Sonadia Abdul Bari Dakhil Madrasa
- Jahazmara Women's Dakhil Madrasa
- Haji Fazil Ahmad Dakhil Madrasa
- Khaserhat Majidia Dakhil Madrasa
- Nalchira Sayyid Ahmad Dakhil Madrasa
- Jahajmara High School
- Burirchar Shaheed Ali Ahmed Memorial High School
- A.M High School
- Oskhali K.S.S. High School
- Tamaraddi high school and college
- Hatiya Dwip Govt College
- Hatiya Community College

== Facilities ==
Hatiya Upazila has orphanage facilities across its territory. These include Hatiya Island Orphanage, Darul Aitam Oskhali and the Jahazmara Orphanage.

== Notable people ==
- Amirul Islam Kalam, member of parliament (1973–1982)
- Mohammad Ali, former member of parliament
- Mohammad Fazlul Azim, industrialist and business magnate
- Muhammad Waliullah, professor

== Market ==
List of Markets
Name	Location
Hatiya New Market	Oskhali
Hatiya Super Market	Oskhali
Tamaraddi Bazar	Tamaraddi
Dr.Md.Iqbal Ansari Plaza	Oskhali
Elias Shopping Zone	Oskhali Serajol Hoque Memebarer Notun Bari
Jahajmara Bazaar	Jahajmara

== See also ==
- Districts of Bangladesh
- Divisions of Bangladesh
- List of islands of Bangladesh
