= ASM Enamul Haque =

Bangladeshi politician (1945–2023)

Member of Bangladesh Parliament
- In office February 1996 – 12 June 1996
- Preceded by: Moudud Ahmed
- Succeeded by: Obaidul Quader

Personal details
- Born: 1945 Noakhali, Bengal Province, British India
- Died: 22 July 2023 (aged 78) Dhaka, Bangladesh
- Political party: Bangladesh Nationalist Party

ASM Enamul Haque (1944/1945 – 22 July 2023) was a Bangladesh Nationalist Party politician and a member of parliament from Noakhali-5.

== Biography ==
Haque was born in 1945 in Birahimpur village of what is now Sirajpur Union, Companiganj Upazila, Noakhali. He was the third child of Ali Ahmed Chowdhury. Haque earned a B.Sc. in engineering, after which he joined the army.

Haque was elected to parliament from Noakhali-5 as a Bangladesh Nationalist Party candidate in February 1996.

Haque died at Square Hospital, Dhaka, on 22 July 2023, at the age of 78.
