= Oskhali =

Human settlement in Bangladesh

Coordinates: 22.2909°N 91.1406°E

Oskhali is a small town on Hatiya island of Noakhali District in the Chittagong Division, Bangladesh.

The town is in the centre of Hatiya. The town has a population of about 50,000. Most of the people live under the poverty line. Still, there are many educated people who live there. Access to Nijhum Dwip island is through this town. A M High School is located in the town.
