= Noakhali-5 =

Constituency of Bangladesh's Jatiya Sangsad

Coordinates: 25.08°N 91.76°E

- Constituency for the Jatiya Sangsad
- District: Noakhali District
- Division: Chittagong Division
- Electorate: 331,793 (2018)

Current constituency
- Created: 1973
- Party: Bangladesh Nationalist Party
- Member: Muhammad Fakrul Islam
- ← 271 Noakhali-4 273 Noakhali-6 →

Noakhali-5 is a constituency represented in the Jatiya Sangsad (National Parliament) of Bangladesh since 2026 by Muhammad Fakrul Islam of the Bangladesh Nationalist Party.

== Boundaries ==
The constituency encompasses Companiganj and Kabirhat upazilas.

== History ==
The constituency was created for the first general elections in newly independent Bangladesh, held in 1973.

Ahead of the 2018 general election, the Election Commission reduced the boundaries of the constituency by removing two union parishads of Noakhali Sadar Upazila: Ashwadia and Niazpur.

== Members of Parliament ==
| Election | Member | Party |
|---|---|---|
| 1973 | Abdur Rahman | Awami League |
| 1979 | Moudud Ahmed | Bangladesh Nationalist Party |
| 1986 | Hasna Jasimuddin Moudud | Awami League |
| 1991 | Moudud Ahmed | Jatiya Party |
| Feb 1996 | ASM Enamul Haque | Bangladesh Nationalist Party |
| Jun 1996 | Obaidul Quader | Awami League |
| 2001 | Moudud Ahmed | Bangladesh Nationalist Party |
| 2008 | Obaidul Quader | Awami League |
| 2026 | Muhammad Fakrul Islam | Bangladesh Nationalist Party |

== Elections ==
=== Elections in the 2010s ===
Obaidul Quader was re-elected unopposed in the 2014 general election after opposition parties withdrew their candidacies in a boycott of the election.

=== Elections in the 2000s ===
General Election 2008: Noakhali-5
| Party | Candidate | Votes | % | ±% |
|---|---|---|---|---|
| AL | Obaidul Quader | 112,575 | 50.1 | +23.9 |
| BNP | Moudud Ahmed | 111,204 | 49.5 | +1.2 |
| Independent | Enayet Ullah Siddiqui | 766 | 0.3 | N/A |
| Majority | | 1,371 | 0.6 | −21.4 |
| Turnout | | 224,545 | 85.8 | +20.5 |
| AL gain from BNP | | | | |

General Election 2001: Noakhali-5
| Party | Candidate | Votes | % | ±% |
|---|---|---|---|---|
| BNP | Moudud Ahmed | 84,578 | 48.3 | +28.3 |
| AL | Obaidul Quader | 45,972 | 26.2 | −10.5 |
| Independent | Ekramul Karim Chowdhury | 42,048 | 24.0 | N/A |
| IJOF | A. N. M. Shahajahan | 1,932 | 1.1 | N/A |
| JSD | Abdur Razzak | 341 | 0.2 | N/A |
| Independent | Golap Mowla | 199 | 0.1 | N/A |
| Jatiya Party (M) | Bikash Chandra Sarkar | 106 | 0.1 | N/A |
| BKA | Md. Mizanur Rahman Sahabuddin | 105 | 0.1 | N/A |
| Majority | | 38,606 | 22.0 | +11.5 |
| Turnout | | 175,281 | 65.3 | +1.5 |
| BNP gain from AL | | | | |

=== Elections in the 1990s ===
General Election June 1996: Noakhali-5
| Party | Candidate | Votes | % | ±% |
|---|---|---|---|---|
| AL | Obaidul Quader | 40,280 | 36.7 | +4.7 |
| JP(E) | Moudud Ahmed | 28,744 | 26.2 | −9.8 |
| BNP | A .S. M. Enamul Haque | 21,929 | 20.0 | +2.8 |
| Jamaat | Abu Naser Md. Abduj Zaher | 17,445 | 15.9 | +1.6 |
| Independent | A. N. M. Shahjahan | 560 | 0.5 | N/A |
| Jatiya Samajtantrik Dal-JSD | Anisul Haque | 312 | 0.3 | 0.0 |
| Gano Forum | Mohammad Hanif | 226 | 0.2 | N/A |
| Zaker Party | A. M. M. Anowar | 182 | 0.2 | N/A |
| Majority | | 11,536 | 10.5 | +6.5 |
| Turnout | | 109,678 | 63.8 | +28.5 |
| AL gain from JP(E) | | | | |

General Election 1991: Noakhali-5
| Party | Candidate | Votes | % | ±% |
|---|---|---|---|---|
| JP(E) | Moudud Ahmed | 31,448 | 36.0 | |
| AL | Obaidul Quader | 27,917 | 32.0 | |
| BNP | Md. Zakir Hossain | 15,047 | 17.2 | |
| Jamaat | Abu Naser Md. Abduj Zaher | 12,499 | 14.3 | |
| Jatiya Samajtantrik Dal-JSD | Khizir Hayat | 231 | 0.3 | |
| Bangladesh Muslim League (Kader) | S. M. Abul Kasem | 148 | 0.2 | |
| Majority | | 3,531 | 4.0 | |
| Turnout | | 87,290 | 35.3 | |
| JP(E) gain from AL | | | | |
