= M. Hasan Ali Khan =

Bangladeshi admiral

Mohammad Hasan Ali Khan

10th Chief of Naval Staff
- In office 9 January 2005 – 9 February 2007
- President: Iajuddin Ahmed
- Prime Minister: Khaleda Zia; Iajuddin Ahmed (acting); Fazlul Haque (acting); Fakhruddin Ahmed (acting)
- Preceded by: Shah Iqbal Mujtaba
- Succeeded by: Sarwar Jahan Nizam

Personal details
- Died: 19 February 2013 (aged 63) Dhaka, Bangladesh

Military service
- Allegiance: Pakistan; Bangladesh
- Branch/service: Pakistan Navy; Bangladesh Navy
- Years of service: 1970-2007
- Rank: Rear Admiral
- Commands: Assistant Chief of Naval Staff (Logistics); Chief of Naval Staff

M Hasan Ali Khan ndc, psc, BN (4 January 1950 - 19 February 2013) was Chief of Staff of the Bangladesh Navy between 2005 and 2007. He was preceded by Rear Admiral Shah Iqbal Mujtaba ndc, psc, BN and succeeded by Vice Admiral Sarwar Jahan Nizam ndu, psc, BN.

== Naval commands ==
Khan was assistant chief of the naval staff (logistics). He was promoted to rear admiral effective 10 January 2005. He became Chief of Naval Staff on that day, and served in that position until retiring on February 10, 2007.

He died on 19 February 2013 and was buried at Banani military graveyard. He was survived by his wife and two daughters.

Military offices
Preceded by Rear Admiral Shah Iqbal Mujtaba	Chief of Naval Staff; 2005 - 2007	Succeeded by Vice Admiral Sarwar Jahan Nizam
