= Swarna Dweep =

Bangladesh administered island in Bay of Bengal

Coordinates: 22.519°N 91.299°E

Native name: Jahaijar Char
- Interactive map of Swarna Dweep

Geography
- Location: Bay of Bengal
- Area: 360 km^{2} (140 sq mi)

Administration
- Bangladesh
- Division: Chittagong Division
- District: Noakhali District
- Upazila: Hatiya Upazila

Demographics
- Population: Inhabited

Swarna Dweep, also known as Jahaijar Char, is an inhabited island in the Bay of Bengal. It is a part of the Hatiya Upazila under Noakhali District of Chittagong Division, Bangladesh. It is administered by Bangladesh Army as a strategic training base. The Island is 360 square kilometer and is located in the Meghna estuary.

== History ==
Swarna Dweep emerged in the Bay of Bengal in 1978 under Noakhali District and was named Jahaijar Char. The island was inaccessible and soon became a safe haven for bandits and pirates.

In 2013, the Island was renamed to Swarna Dweep and the administration of the island was given to the Bangladesh Army, who were tasked to develop the island, establish government services, and maintain security. By 2017, Bangladesh Army had built two cyclone shelters and one army camp. The army has developed a daily farm, fish farming, and a coconut plantation. In addition to 1,500 coconut saplings, the army planted 60 thousand tamarisk saplings. They use the island for armored training, and have eliminated piracy in the island. The government announced plans to build a shelter named Mujib Killa in the Island. As part of a bigger plan to build 400 storm shelters along the coastline of Bangladesh.

In 2018, President Abdul Hamid laid the foundation of a hospital in the island to be built by Bangladesh Army. The government also announced plans to turn the island into a tourist area.

In January 2020, Bangladesh Army carried out winter exercises in the island called Operation Bijoy Gourab. It was overseen by the then Prime Minister Sheikh Hasina.
