= Amir Ahmed Mustafa =

Former chief of staff of the Bangladesh Navy

5th Chief of Naval Staff
- In office 15 August 1990 – 2 May 1991
- President: Hussain Muhammad Ershad
- Prime Minister: Kazi Zafar Ahmed; Khaleda Zia
- Preceded by: Sultan Ahmed
- Succeeded by: Muhammad Mohaiminul Islam

Military service
- Allegiance: Bangladesh
- Branch/service: Bangladesh Navy
- Rank: Rear Admiral

Amir Ahmed Mustafa is a retired rear admiral who was the chief of staff of the Bangladesh Navy from 15 August 1990 to 4 June 1991.

== Career ==
Mustafa was the chief of naval staff.

Mustafa was sent into retirement in June 1991. Muhammad Muhaiminul Islam replaced him as the chief of naval staff. The chief of air staff, Vice Marshal Mumtazuddin Ahmed, was also replaced. This was believed to be in response to the ships and aeroplanes of the Bangladesh Navy and Bangladesh Air Force being damaged in the 1991 Bangladesh cyclone. All major ships of the Bangladesh Navy were sunk or immobilized.

== Personal life ==
Mustafa's home in Mohakhali DOHS was robbed in July 2010. He won a prize in the Korean Cup golf tournament in 2012.

== See also ==
Military offices
Preceded by Rear Admiral Sultan Ahmed	Chief of Naval Staff; 15 August 1990 - 04 June 1991	Succeeded by Rear Admiral Muhammad Mohaiminul Islam
