= Shah Iqbal Mujtaba =

Bangladeshi rear admiral

9th Chief of Naval Staff
- In office 4 June 2002 – 9 January 2005
- President: A. Q. M. Badruddoza Chowdhury; Muhammad Jamiruddin Sircar (acting); Iajuddin Ahmed
- Prime Minister: Khaleda Zia
- Preceded by: Abu Taher
- Succeeded by: M. Hasan Ali Khan

4th Director General of Bangladesh Coast Guard
- In office 29 January 2002 – 29 May 2002
- President: A. Q. M. Badruddoza Chowdhury
- Prime Minister: Khaleda Zia
- Preceded by: Mohammad Shahabuddin
- Succeeded by: S. M. H. Kabir

Personal details
- Born: 11 February 1948 (age 78) Dacca, East Bengal, Pakistan

Military service
- Allegiance: Pakistan; Bangladesh
- Branch: Pakistan Navy; Bangladesh Navy; Bangladesh Coast Guard
- Service years: 1970–2005
- Rank: Rear Admiral
- Commands: Commodore − Administrative Authority Dhaka; Commander − BN Flotilla; Commander − BNS Titumir (Khulna); Commander − BNS Issa Khan (Chittagong); Asst Chief of Staff (Personnel); Asst Chief of Staff (Operations)

Shah Iqbal Mujtaba, ndc, psc, BN (born 11 February 1948) is former chief of staff for the Bangladesh Navy.

== Early life ==
Mujtaba joined the erstwhile Pakistan Navy as an officer cadet on 11 November 1966, and was commissioned in the Executive Branch on 1 June 1970. Mujtaba graduated from the Defence Services Command & Staff College, Dhaka, and from the National Defence College Dhaka in 2001. Besides, he attended the Senior International Defence Management Course (SIDMC) at the US Naval Postgraduate School in 1993 and the Legal Aspect of Military & Peacekeeping Operations Course at the US Naval Justice School in 1998.

== Naval commands ==
As a qualified officer, Mujtaba commanded various kinds of ships and establishments. He performed as director of naval operations (DNO), director of naval plans (DNP) and director of naval intelligence (DNI) at Naval Headquarters. As a senior officer of the Bangladesh Navy, Mujtaba held all kinds of command and staff positions that include Naval Administrative Authority Dhaka (ADMIN Dhaka), Commodore Commanding Khulna (COMKHUL), Commodore Commanding BN Flotilla (COMBAN) and Commodore Commanding Chittagong (COMCHIT). At Naval Headquarters, he served as assistant chief of naval staff (operations) and assistant chief of naval staff (personnel).

Besides his professional duties, he also served as deputy commandant of the Defence Services Command and Staff College, Dhaka. He was also the senior directing staff at the National Defence College, Dhaka. Mujtaba held a diplomatic appointment as defence adviser in Malaysia. Prior to his appointment as chief of naval staff, he served as director general of the Bangladesh Coast Guard under the Ministry of Home Affairs.

Rear Admiral Shah Iqbal Mujtaba was appointed chief of naval staff on 4 June 2002. Admiral Mujtaba came to normal retirement on 10 January 2005 after ending his 34 years of naval service.

== Personal life ==
Mujataba is married to Naima Mujtaba. They have two daughters.

== See also ==
- Military of Bangladesh

Military offices
Preceded by Rear Admiral Abu Taher	Chief of Naval Staff; 2002–2005	Succeeded by Rear Admiral M. Hasan Ali Khan
