= Mohammad Ali (Noakhali politician) =

Bangladeshi politician

- মোহাম্মদ আলী

Member of the Bangladesh Parliament for Noakhali-6
- In office 30 January 2024 – 6 August 2024
- Preceded by: Ayesha Ferdaus
- In office 28 October 2001 – 27 October 2006
- Preceded by: Mohammad Fazlul Azim
- Succeeded by: Mohammad Fazlul Azim
- In office 10 July 1986 – 6 December 1990
- Preceded by: Borhan Uddin
- Succeeded by: Md. Wali Ullah

Personal details
- Born: 16 January 1955 (age 71)
- Party: Bangladesh Awami League
- Spouse: Ayesha Ferdaus

Mohammad Ali (born 16 January 1955) is a Bangladesh Awami League politician and a former Jatiya Sangsad member representing the Noakhali-6 constituency. He is also the president of Hatia Upazila Awami League.

== Career ==
Ali was elected to parliament from Noakhali-6 as a Jatiya Party candidate in 1986 and 1988, as an independent candidate in 2001 and as an Awami League candidate in 2024.

On 11 August 2024, Ali and his family were taken into custody by Bangladesh Navy. According to Lieutenant Commander Ridwanuzzaman, the family were taken custody because they had been accused of terrorism, extortion and corruption in the Hatiya area.

== Personal life ==
Ali is married to Ayesha Ferdaus, who had served as the MP of the same Noakhali-6 constituency during 2014–2024. Together, they have a son, Asif Ali, who is the chairman of Hatia Upazila Parishad as of 2024. They live in Charkailash of Hatiya Municipality in Noakhali district.
