= Sarwar Jahan Nizam =

Bangladeshi Naval Officer and Navy Chief (1952–2025)

Vice Admiral Sarwar Jahan Nizam

11th Chief of Naval Staff
- In office 10 February 2007 – 28 January 2009
- President: Iajuddin Ahmed
- Prime Minister: Fakhruddin Ahmed (acting); Sheikh Hasina
- Preceded by: M. Hasan Ali Khan
- Succeeded by: Zahir Uddin Ahmed

6th Director General of Bangladesh Coast Guard
- In office 6 March 2005 – 8 February 2007
- President: Iajuddin Ahmed
- Prime Minister: Khaleda Zia; Iajuddin Ahmed (acting); Fazlul Haque (acting); Fakhruddin Ahmed (acting)
- Preceded by: S. M. H. Kabir
- Succeeded by: Mohammad Abul Kalam Azad

Personal details
- Born: 2 November 1952 (age 73) Anwara, East Bengal, Pakistan

Military service
- Allegiance: Bangladesh
- Branch/service: Bangladesh Navy; Bangladesh Coast Guard
- Years of service: 1973-2009
- Rank: Vice Admiral
- Commands: BNS Umar Farooq; Commander, BN Fleet (COMBAN); Commander Chittagong Naval Area, (COMCHIT); Assistant Chief of Staff (Operations); Assistant Chief of Staff (Personnel); Director General, Bangladesh Coast Guard; Chief of Naval Staff

Sarwar Jahan Nizam (Note: (G), ndu, psc, BN) (2 November 1952 – 10 October 2025) was a Bangladeshi naval officer who was the first three star admiral and chief of naval staff for the Bangladesh Navy.

== Early life ==
Nizam was born in the Anwara of then East Bengal in Dominion of Pakistan (now in Chittagong Division, Bangladesh) on 2 November 1952. He joined the erstwhile Pakistan Navy as an officer cadet at the age of 18, and completed six months training at the Pakistan Military Academy in Kakul. In 1970, he joined the Pakistan Naval Academy in Karachi and was commissioned 1st into the executive branch as a gunnery officer of the Pakistan Navy and subsequently in the Bangladesh Navy in 1973.

Nizam graduated from the Defence Services Command and Staff College in 1986 and from the National Defence University in China on 1996. Nizam also attended the Communication Specialization Course with the Royal Navy and completed a Senior Executive Course with the Asia Pacific Centre for Securities Studies in the United States.

== Military career ==
Nizam commanded two warships, two offshore vessels, two patrol crafts, one naval base and one mine-sweeper craft. Nizam furthermore commanded the Bangladesh naval flotilla and the Chittagong naval area.

Nizam was the director general of the Bangladesh Coast Guard, in which, he commissioned the construction of the first sectionally built coastguard vessels. He also oversaw the BN Dockyard at Khulna. At naval headquarters, Nizam served as the director of intelligence and drafting authority. He was also the assistant chief of naval staff for operations and then personnel. On 10 February 2007 Nizam was appointed the chief of naval staff. He was promoted to vice admiral on 23 May same year. Nizam was instrumental in modernizing the navy and the amelioration of Bangladesh naval fleet. As naval chief, Nizam also served as president of the Bangladesh Swimming Federation. Nizam went into retirement on 29 January 2009 and was succeeded by rear admiral Zahir Uddin Ahmed.

== Personal life and death ==
Admiral Nizam was married to Munira Nizam and the couple had one daughter, Nafeesa Hadi. He died on 10 October 2025, at the age of 72.

== See also ==
- Military of Bangladesh
- Muhammad Shahid Sarwar

Military offices
| Preceded by Rear Admiral M. Hasan Ali Khan | Chief of Naval Staff; 2007–2009 | Succeeded by Vice Admiral Zahir Uddin Ahmed |
