= Borhan Uddin =

Bangladeshi politician

Member of Bangladesh Parliament
- In office 1979–1986
- Preceded by: Md. Hanif
- Succeeded by: Mohammad Ali

Personal details
- Political party: Bangladesh Nationalist Party

Borhan Uddin is a Bangladesh Nationalist Party politician and a former member of parliament for Noakhali-6.

== Career ==
Borhan Uddin was elected to parliament from Noakhali-6 as a Bangladesh Nationalist Party candidate in 1979.
