= Momtazuddin Ahmad =

Bengali Islamic scholar (1883–1938)

Mawlana Momtazuddin Ahmad
- মমতাজুদ্দীন আহমদ

Personal life
- Born: 1889 Manikpur, Noakhali District, Bengal Presidency
- Died: 1974 (aged 84–85) Bangladesh
- Children: Moudud Ahmed

Religious life
- Religion: Islam
- Denomination: Sunni
- Jurisprudence: Hanafi

Muslim leader
- Students: Amimul Ehsan Barkati
- Arabic name
- Personal (Ism): Aḥmad أحمد
- Patronymic (Nasab): ibn Muḥammad Jalīs بن محمد جليس
- Epithet (Laqab): Mumtāz ad-Dīn ممتاز الدين; Fakhr al-Muḥaddithīn فخر المحدثين
- Toponymic (Nisba): al-Būiyān البوئيان an-Nawākhālawī النواخالوي

Mawlana Momtazuddin Ahmad (Bengali: মমতাজুদ্দীন আহমদ; 1889–1974) was a Bengali Islamic scholar, author and teacher. He is the father of former Prime Minister Moudud Ahmed.

== Early life and education ==
Momtazuddin Ahmad was born in 1889 to a Bengali Muslim family of Bhuiyans in the village of Manikpur in Noakhali District, Bengal Presidency. His father, Muhammad Jalees Bhuiyan, was a sheikh.

After finishing primary school, Ahmad moved to Calcutta and became a student at its Alia Madrasa in 1907. He passed from Jamaat-i-Suwam in 1910 and Jamaat-i-Ula in 1913. In 1916, he graduated in Hadith studies from the madrasa and awarded Fakhr al-Muhadditheen (Glory of the Hadith scholars). His Hadith teachers were Ishaq Burdwani and Nazir Hasan Deobandi. His other teachers included Lutfur Rahman Burdwani, Abdul Haq Haqqani and Fazl-e-Haq Rampuri. Ahmad passed his matriculation from the University of Calcutta Board in 1918.

== Career ==
Ahmad remained in Calcutta after completing his education, teaching Hadith studies at the Calcutta Alia Madrasa from 1919. He also briefly served as a lecturer of Arabic at the Presidency College in 1921. He relocated to the Government Madrasah-e-Alia, Dacca in 1953, six years after the Partition of Bengal. Among his notable students are Amimul Ehsan Barkati.

== Personal life ==
Ahmad married Begum Ambia Khatun. His fourth son, Moudud Ahmed, served as the Prime Minister of Bangladesh from 1988 to 1989.

== Works ==
Ahmad primarily wrote in Arabic, Bengali and Urdu. Among his published works are:

- Ḥall al-ʿUqdah fī Sharḥ Sabʿ Muʿallaqah
- Sahl al-Maʿālī fī Sharḥ Maqāmāt Badīʿ az-Zāmān al-Hamadhānī
- Niʿmah al-Munʿim fī Sharḥ Muqaddimah Sahih Muslim
- Al-Kawkab ad-Durrī fī Sharḥ Muqaddimah Mishkat al-Masabih
- Kashf al-Maʿānī fī Sharḥ Maqāmāt al-Ḥarīrī
- Nabī Parichay
- Qurān Parichiti
- Paribāgher Shāh Sāheber Jībanī

== Death ==
Ahmad died in 1974.
