= Muhammad Fakrul Islam =

Bangladeshi politician

Members of Parliament
- Incumbent
- Assumed office 17 February 2026
- Preceded by: Obaidul Quader
- Constituency: Noakhali-5

Personal details
- Born: Noakhali
- Party: Bangladesh Nationalist Party
- Occupation: Politician

Muhammad Fakrul Islam is a Bangladeshi politician with the Bangladesh Nationalist Party. He was elected as the Member of Parliament for the Noakhali-5 constituency in the 2026 Bangladeshi general election held on 12 February 2026.
