= Mohammad Nurul Islam (admiral) =

Bangladesh Navy Chief

7th Chief of Naval Staff
- In office 4 June 1995 – 3 June 1999
- President: Abdur Rahman Biswas; Shahabuddin Ahmed
- Prime Minister: Muhammad Habibur Rahman (acting); Sheikh Hasina
- Preceded by: Muhammad Mohaiminul Islam
- Succeeded by: Abu Taher

Personal details
- Born: 1 October 1946

Military service
- Allegiance: Bangladesh
- Branch/service: Bangladesh Navy
- Rank: Rear Admiral
- Commands: Chiefs of Naval Staff

Mohammad Nurul Islam ncc, psc, (BN) is a retired rear admiral who was chief of staff of the Bangladesh Navy from 4 June 1995 to 3 June 1999.

== See also ==
Military offices
Preceded by Rear Admiral Muhammad Mohaiminul Islam	Chief of Naval Staff; 04 June 1995 to 03 June 1999	Succeeded by Rear Admiral Abu Taher
