= Sultan Ahmed (admiral) =

Bangladeshi military figure and politician

4th Chief of Naval Staff
- In office 6 August 1984 – 14 August 1990
- President: Hussain Muhammad Ershad
- Prime Minister: Ataur Rahman Khan; Mizanur Rahman Chowdhury; Moudud Ahmed; Kazi Zafar Ahmed
- Preceded by: Mahbub Ali Khan
- Succeeded by: Amir Ahmed Mustafa

Personal details
- Born: 4 April 1938 Rajshahi, Bengal, British India
- Died: 21 December 2012 (aged 74) Dhaka, Bangladesh
- Awards: Navy Cross; PPM (bsr)

Military service
- Allegiance: Pakistan (before 1971); Bangladesh
- Branch/service: Pakistan Navy; Bangladesh Navy; Bangladesh Coast Guard
- Years of service: 1959-1990
- Rank: Rear admiral
- Commands: Chiefs of Naval Staff; Deputy Director General of DGFI; Deputy Director General of Bangladesh Coast Guard; Deputy Inspector General of Bangladesh Police

Sultan Ahmed was the 4th chief of the Bangladesh Navy, addressed as the chief of naval staff (CNS). He was a gunnery officer aboard a missile frigate in the Pakistan Navy and qualified to be a logistics officer on a submarine. Between 1963 and 1968 he was a submarine warfare officer. At the time of the 1971 war, he was studying in the United States Army Intelligence Center for a joint NATO counter-intelligence training program

He was made the deputy director general of newly created DGFI under Lieutenant General Ziaur Rahman's supervision. He was a deputy martial law administrator during the regime of President Hussain Muhammad Ershad and the Minister for Communication and Shipping. Upon the death of naval chief Rear Admiral Mahbub Ali Khan on 6 August 1984, Sultan Ahmed became the chief of Bangladesh navy. He continued to serve as the naval chief till 14 August 1990, few months before Ershad resigned as the president of the country. He was also elected as a member of parliament from Rajshahi.

Military offices
Preceded by Rear Admiral Mahbub Ali Khan	Chief of Naval Staff; 06 August 1984 - 14 August 1990	Succeeded by Rear Admiral Amir Ahmed Mustafa
