= Md. Hanif =

Bangladeshi politician

Member of Bangladesh Parliament
- In office 1973–1979
- Succeeded by: Borhan Uddin

Personal details
- Party: Bangladesh Awami League

Md. Hanif is a Bangladesh Awami League politician and a former member of parliament for Noakhali-6.

== Career ==
Hanif was elected to parliament from Noakhali-6 as a Bangladesh Awami League candidate in 1973.
