= Abu Taher (admiral) =

8th Chief of Naval Staff
- In office 4 June 1999 – 3 June 2002
- President: Shahabuddin Ahmed; A. Q. M. Badruddoza Chowdhury
- Prime Minister: Sheikh Hasina; Latifur Rahman (acting); Khaleda Zia
- Preceded by: Mohammad Nurul Islam
- Succeeded by: Shah Iqbal Mujtaba

Military service
- Allegiance: Bangladesh
- Branch/service: Bangladesh Navy
- Rank: Rear Admiral

Abu Taher is a retired rear admiral who was chief of staff of the Bangladesh Navy from 4 June 1999 to 3 June 2002.

Taher was elected to the Comilla District Council in 2016 as an Awami League candidate. He sought the Awami League nomination for the Comilla-8 (Barura Upazila) constituency for the 2024 Bangladeshi general election.

Military offices
Preceded by Rear Admiral Mohammad Nurul Islam	Chief of Naval Staff; 04 June 1995 to 03 June 1999	Succeeded by Rear Admiral Shah Iqbal Mujtaba
