= Companiganj Upazila, Noakhali =

Companiganj কোম্পানীগঞ্জ
- Upazila
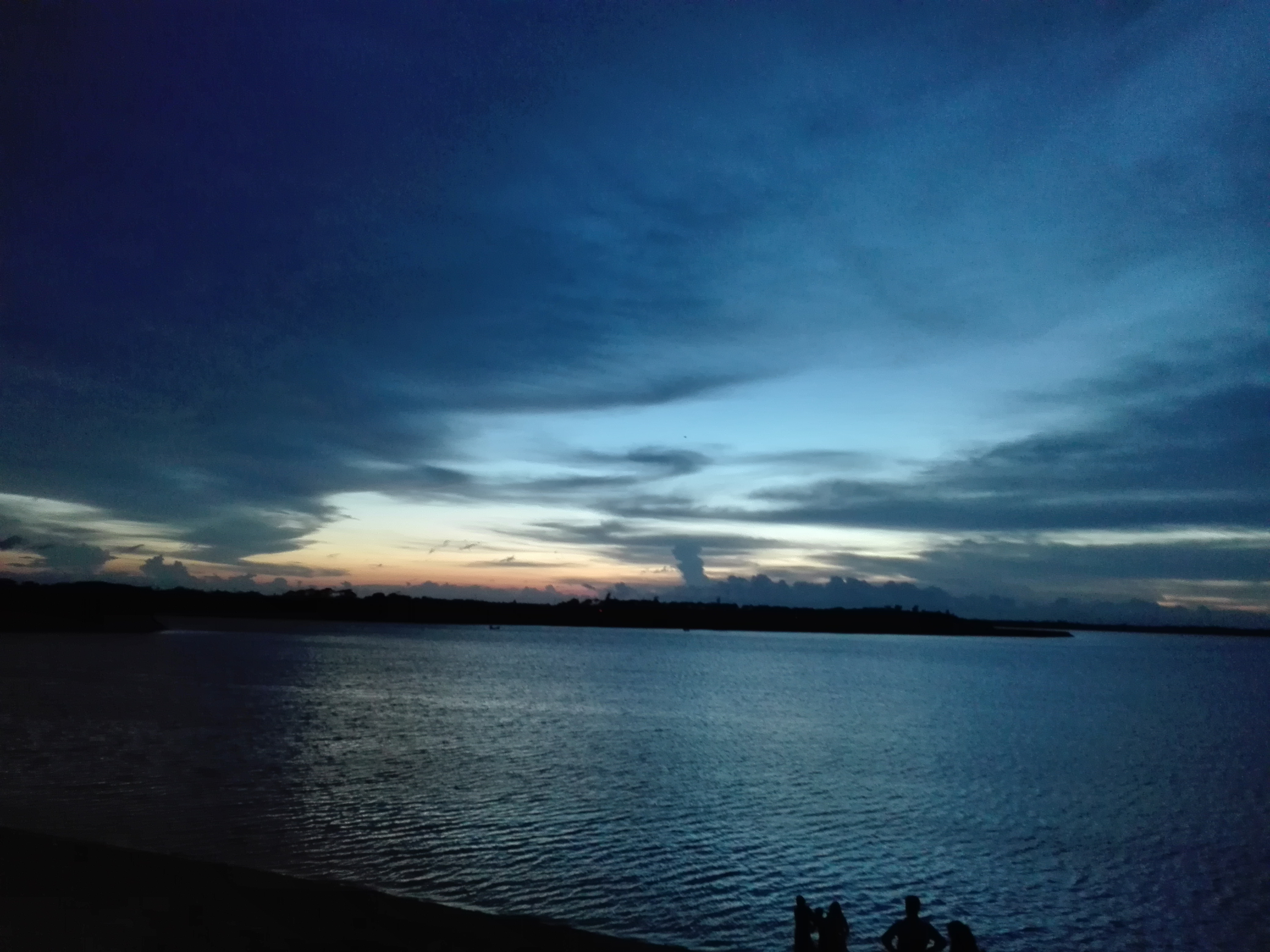
- Muchapur beach, Companiganj upazila

- Coordinates: 22°52.5′N 91°17′E
- Country: Bangladesh
- Division: Chittagong
- District: Noakhali
- Thana: 1888
- Upazila: 2 July 1983

Area
  - Total: 380.95 km^{2} (147.09 sq mi)

Population (2022)
  - Total: 301,310
  - Density: 790.94/km^{2} (2,048.5/sq mi)
- Time zone: UTC+6 (BST)
- Postal code: 3850
- Area code: 03223
- Website: companiganj.noakhali.gov.bd

Companiganj (Bengali: কোম্পানীগঞ্জ) is an upazila of Noakhali District. Basurhat is the only municipality in this upazila. The area is famed for water buffalo doi (curd).

== History ==
The Port of Jugdia (presently in Sirajpur Union) gained relevance as an important commercial seaport during the Bengal Sultanate period. With the advent of the Mughals, the Eidagazi Mosque was constructed in Charhazari. In 1853, the British East India Company set up a factory in Jugdia and a textile mill there in 1857. The French East India Company also set up huge textile mills here and these textiles and salt, including the native textiles produced by the Tantis, were exported abroad through the Port of Jugdia. Companiganj was established as a thana (police outpost) in 1888, by the British colonial administrators, named after the British East India Company. The map of Companiganj and Sandwip Upazila at the mouth of the Meghna River estuary and at the confluence of the Bamni rivers changes every few years. During the British rule, there was a Bamni Thana in this area (in Rampur Union). There are also villages named Bamni and Musapur in Sandwip. It is known that people from these two areas emigrated from Sandwip due to river breakage. These two regions of Companiganj and Sandwip had close contact even until the 1960s. The people of Bamni in Sandwip were reportedly the descendants of a Brahmin woman, and when they migrated to Bamni (Rampur), it caused issues due to the class and cultural differences. The Sandwipis of Companiganj are said to maintain a distinct identity to the native Companiganjis.

The 20th century marked an important development of Islamic education in Companiganj. In 1915, the Asria Senior Madrasa was established in Bamni. Eight years later, the Islamia Senior Madrasa was founded in Basurhat. During the Bangladesh Liberation War of 1971, a Razakar force was established in Companiganj by the grandsons of Moulvi Minnat Ali of Bamni. One of their brothers, Rafi Uddin, became the central leader of the Al-Badr force. When the freedom fighters went to liberate the Charfaqira Union by setting up base at the nearby Chaprashi market, freedom fighter Abdur Rob was killed. Salih Ahmad and others were killed by a surprise attack by the Razakars. A brawl took place near the sluice gate on Banchharam Road between the Bengali freedom fighters against the Pakistan Army and their collaborators on 4 September. As a result, six freedom fighters were killed. A number of other encounters took place in Companiganj, with the Liberation of Bamni leading to the death of seven freedom fighters including Sadar BLF Commander Ohidur Rahman Wadud. Their bodies lie in a mass grave near Sluice Gate no 16.

On 2 July 1983, Companiganj Thana was upgraded to an upazila (sub-district) as part of President Hussain Muhammad Ershad's decentralisation programme.

== Geography ==
Companigani is bounded by Senbgh and Daganbhuiyan upazilas to the north, Noakhali Sadar and Sandwip to the south, Sonagazi and Mirsharai to the east, and Noakhali Sadar to the west. The main rivers are Little Feni and Bamni.

Companiganj (town) stands six km south of Maijdi Road. The town consists of six mouzas. It has an area of 6.5 km^{2} (2.5 sq mi).

== Demographics ==
Religions in Companiganj Upazila (2022)
Religion	Percent
Islam	94.72%
Hinduism	5.27%
Other or not stated	0.01%

According to the 2022 Bangladeshi census, Companiganj Upazila had 65,348 households and a population of 301,310. 11.26% of the population were under 5 years of age. Companiganj had a literacy rate (age 7 and over) of 75.59%: 76.28% for males and 75.00% for females, and a sex ratio of 87.47 males for every 100 females. 85,854 (28.49%) lived in urban areas.

According to the 2011 Census of Bangladesh, Companiganj Upazila had 49,015 households and a population of 250,579. 64,195 (25.62%) were under 10 years of age. Companiganj had a literacy rate (age 7 and over) of 51.31%, compared to the national average of 51.8%, and a sex ratio of 1087 females per 1000 males. 29,877 (11.92%) lived in urban areas.

== Administration ==

UNO: Md. Anwar Hossain Patwary.

Companiganj Upazila has one municipality: Basurhat Municipality, and eight union parishads: Charelahi, Charfakira, Charhazari, Charkakra, Charparboti, Musapur, Rampur, and Sirajpur. The union parishads are subdivided into 36 mauzas and 45 villages.

Companiganj Municipality is subdivided into 9 wards and 11 mahallas.

=== Chairmen ===
List of chairmen
Name	Date
Bazlur Rahman	1980-1990
Muhammad Shahabuddin	2008-2014
Mizanur Rahman Badal	2014-2019
Muhammad Shahabuddin Charhazari	2019-2024

Mohammad Golam Shorif Chowdhury 2024-present

== Education ==
A government college, three non-government colleges, two government high schools, twenty-six non-government high schools, nine madrasas, one technical institution, fifty-seven government primary schools and nineteen non-government primary schools. Noted educational institutions include: Basurhat A. H. C. Government High School (1911), Companigong model high school (1982), Kabi Jashim Uddin High School (1986), Bamni High School (1914), Bamni College, Chowdhuryhat College, Basurhat Islamia Senior Madrasa (1914), Bamni Achhia Senior Madrasa (1915), Hazarihat High School, B.M College and Charparboti S. C High School.

English medium - Oxford school and College (2017)

Cultural organisations Club 22, Press Club, Companigonj, three public libraries, one cinema hall and twenty-six playgrounds

== Facilities ==
There are 242 mosques in Companiganj with notable ones including the historic Eidagazi Mosque in Charhazari as well as the Budi Mosque in Basurhat. The Darza Orphanage in Bara Hafez Saheb Bari, Charparbati is a notable orphanage in the upazila.

== Notable people ==
- Muhammad Qasim, 18th century poet whose works include Siraj ul Qulub, Hitopodesh and Sultan Jamjama
- Abu Naser Chowdhury, former parliamentarian
- ASM Enamul Haque, former member of parliament
- Hasna bint Jasimuddin, environmentalist and politician
- Moudud Ahmed, 8th prime minister of Bangladesh
- Obaidul Quader, minister of road transport and bridges
- Shahadat Hossain Chowdhury, brigadier and election commissioner
- Momtazuddin Ahmad, Islamic scholar
- Mostafa Kamal, volleyball and football player and coach

== See also ==
- Upazilas of Bangladesh
- Districts of Bangladesh
- Divisions of Bangladesh
