= Muhammad Mohaiminul Islam =

Bangladeshi military officer (1941–2020)

6th Chief of Naval Staff
- In office 4 June 1991 – 3 June 1995
- President: Hussain Muhammad Ershad; Shahabuddin Ahmed (acting); Abdur Rahman Biswas
- Prime Minister: Khaleda Zia
- Preceded by: Amir Ahmed Mustafa
- Succeeded by: Mohammad Nurul Islam

Personal details
- Born: September 11, 1941
- Died: 14 July 2020 (aged 78) Dhaka, Bangladesh

Military service
- Allegiance: Pakistan; Bangladesh
- Branch/service: Pakistan Navy; Bangladesh Navy
- Years of service: 1963–1995
- Rank: Rear Admiral
- Commands: Chief of Naval Staff

Muhammad Mohaiminul Islam (11 September 1941 – 14 July 2020) was a Bangladeshi military officer, chief of staff of Bangladesh Navy from 5 June 1991 to 3 June 1995.

== Early life ==
Islam was born on 11 September 1941. In 1959, he joined the Pakistan Navy as a cadet and was commissioned in 1963. He studied at the College of Naval Command and Staff in the Naval War College in the United States.

== Career ==
Islam was the deputy chief of naval staff. He served as the chief of naval staff from 1991 to 1995.

== Death ==
Islam died on 14 July 2020 from COVID-19 complications during the COVID-19 pandemic in Bangladesh.

Military offices
| Preceded by Rear Admiral Amir Ahmed Mustafa | Chief of Naval Staff; 05 June 1991 to 03 June 1995 | Succeeded by Rear Admiral Mohammad Nurul Islam |
