= Noakhali-6 =

Constituency of Bangladesh's Jatiya Sangsad

Coordinates: 22.29°N 91.14°E

- Constituency for the Jatiya Sangsad
- District: Noakhali District
- Division: Chittagong Division
- Electorate: 258,854 (2018)

Current constituency
- Created: 1973
- Party: National Citizen Party
- Member: Abdul Hannan Masud
- ← 272 Noakhali-5 274 Lakshmipur-1 →

Noakhali-6 is a constituency represented in the Jatiya Sangsad (National Parliament) of Bangladesh since 2026 by Abdul Hannan Masud of the National Citizen Party.

== Boundaries ==
The constituency encompasses Hatiya Upazila.

== History ==
The constituency was created for the first general elections in newly independent Bangladesh, held in 1973.

== Members of Parliament ==
Election	Member	Party
1973	Md. Hanif	Awami League
1979	Borhan Uddin	Bangladesh Nationalist Party
1986	Mohammad Ali	Awami League
1991	Md. Wali Ullah	Awami League
1996	Mohammad Fazlul Azim	Bangladesh Nationalist Party
2001	Mohammad Ali	Independent
2008	Mohammad Fazlul Azim	Independent
2014	Ayesha Ferdaus	Awami League
2024	Mohammad Ali	Awami League
2026	Abdul Hannan Masud	National Citizen Party

== Elections ==
=== Elections in the 2010s ===
General Election 2014: Noakhali-6
Party	Candidate	Votes	%	±%
AL	Ayesha Ferdaus	67,547	68.3	N/A
Independent	Md. Amirul Islam	30,919	31.3	N/A
JP(E)	Anowarul Azim	404	0.4	N/A
Majority		36,628	37.0	+33.5
Turnout		98,870	45.9	−42.6
AL gain from Independent				

=== Elections in the 2000s ===
General Election 2008: Noakhali-6
Party	Candidate	Votes	%	±%
Independent	Mohammad Fazlul Azim	72,969	51.2	N/A
Independent	Ayesha Ferdaus	67,983	47.7	N/A
BNP	Md. Shakhawat Hossain	680	0.5	−27.6
Independent	Ahsanul Kader	304	0.2	N/A
WPB	Anwar Hoassain	298	0.2	+0.1
Independent	Md. Nurul Afsar	201	0.1	N/A
Majority		4,986	3.5	−0.9
Turnout		142,435	88.5	+29.1
Independent gain from Independent				

General Election 2001: Noakhali-6
Party	Candidate	Votes	%	±%
Independent	Mohammad Ali	37,477	37.2	N/A
AL	Md. Wali Ullah	33,036	32.8	+0.6
BNP	Mohammad Fazlul Azim	28,335	28.1	−7.4
Independent	Md. Mohiuddin	697	0.7	N/A
Independent	Md. Abdus Sahid	467	0.5	N/A
IJOF	Anowarul Azim	158	0.2	N/A
WPB	Anowar Hossain	109	0.1	N/A
Independent	Mohammad Gias Uddin	97	0.1	N/A
Jatiya Party (M)	Goutam Chowdhury	74	0.1	N/A
JSD	Ishrajur Rahman Shamim	72	0.1	N/A
Independent	Mokammel Haq Malajut	61	0.1	N/A
Independent	Md. Shahjahan Bhuiya	46	0.0	N/A
Independent	Mohiuddin Ahmed	44	0.0	N/A
Independent	Saifuddin Ahmed	44	0.0	N/A
Independent	Md. Gias Uddin	33	0.0	N/A
Independent	Main Uddin	32	0.0	N/A
Independent	Jalal Ahammad	22	0.0	N/A
Majority		4,441	4.4	+1.1
Turnout		100,804	59.4	−3.4
Independent gain from BNP				

=== Elections in the 1990s ===
General Election June 1996: Noakhali-6
Party	Candidate	Votes	%	±%
BNP	Mohammad Fazlul Azim	30,148	35.5	+28.0
AL	Md. Wali Ullah	27,358	32.2	−19.0
JP(E)	Mohammad Ali	25,360	29.8	+0.5
Jamaat	Md. Abul Hossain	1,295	1.5	−8.3
Gano Forum	Md. Manir Uddin	153	0.2	N/A
Jatiya Samajtantrik Dal-JSD	Ishrajur Rahman	110	0.1	N/A
Independent	Md. Kefayat Ullah	101	0.1	N/A
IOJ	Mustafizur Rahman	99	0.1	N/A
Independent	Md. Zaber	67	0.1	N/A
Independent	Lutful Hasan	60	0.1	N/A
Independent	Ziaul Haque Taluk Mian	57	0.1	N/A
Samridhya Bangladesh Andolan	Goutam Chowdhury	52	0.1	N/A
Zaker Party	Md. Abdur Rashid Miah	50	0.1	−0.2
FP	Jamal Uddin	43	0.1	N/A
Bangladesh National Congress	Momen Uddin Ahmed	33	0.0	N/A
Independent	Sajjad Hossain	31	0.0	N/A
Majority		2,790	3.3	−18.6
Turnout		85,017	62.8	+19.9
BNP gain from AL				

General Election 1991: Noakhali-6
Party	Candidate	Votes	%	±%
AL	Md. Wali Ullah	32,590	51.2	
JP(E)	Mohammad Ali	18,655	29.3	
Jamaat	Abul Hossain	6,215	9.8	
BNP	Abu Sufian	4,781	7.5	
WPB	Anwar Hossain	470	0.7	
Independent	Mohiuddin Ahmed	252	0.4	
Zaker Party	Kamal Uddin	205	0.3	
Independent	A. S. M. A. Halim	190	0.3	
Independent	Abul Hossain	167	0.3	
Independent	Moazzem Hossain Bhuiyan	130	0.2	
Majority		13,935	21.9	
Turnout		63,655	42.9	
AL hold				
