= Obaidul Quader =

Bangladeshi politician (born 1952)

- ওবায়দুল কাদের
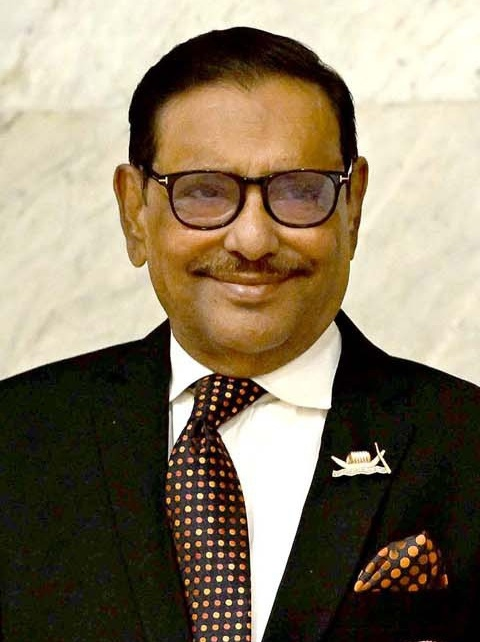
- Quader in 2024

11th General Secretary of Bangladesh Awami League
- Incumbent
- Assumed office 23 October 2016
- Party President: Sheikh Hasina
- Preceded by: Sayed Ashraful Islam

Minister of Road Transport and Bridges
- In office 6 December 2011 – 5 August 2024
- Preceded by: Syed Abul Hossain
- Succeeded by: Muhammad Fouzul Kabir Khan (as Adviser)

Minister of State for Youth and Sports
- In office 23 January 1996 – 15 July 2001
- Prime Minister: Sheikh Hasina
- Preceded by: Sadeque Hossain Khoka
- Succeeded by: Fazlur Rahman Patal

Member of the Bangladesh Parliament for Noakhali-5
- In office 25 January 2009 – 6 August 2024
- Preceded by: Moudud Ahmed
- Succeeded by: Muhammad Fakrul Islam
- In office 14 July 1996 – 13 July 2001
- Preceded by: Moudud Ahmed
- Succeeded by: Moudud Ahmed

President of Bangladesh Chhatra League
- In office 1977–1981
- Leader: Syeda Zohra Tajuddin; Abdul Malek Ukil; Sheikh Hasina
- Preceded by: MA Awal (As Convenor)
- Succeeded by: Mostofa Jalal Mohiuddin

Personal details
- Born: 1 January 1952 (age 74) (Note: The websites of the Bangladesh Parliament and the Road Transport and Highways Division state that he was born on 1 January 1952. And older biographies such as the 2018 one on the Roads and Highways Department website say 1 January 1952.) Noakhali, East Bengal, Pakistan
- Party: Bangladesh Awami League
- Spouse: Isratunnesa Quader
- Education: University of Dhaka (BA)

Obaidul Quader (Note: Bengali: ওবায়দুল কাদের, romanized: Obaydul Kader) (born 1 January 1952) is a Bangladesh Awami League politician. He has served as the general secretary of the Bangladesh Awami League since October 2016. He was previously the Minister of Road Transport and Bridges from 2011 to 2024 and represented the Noakhali-5 Jatiya Sangsad member from 2009 to 2024. He was also the Media Adviser for the Bangladesh Awami League and regularly conducted press conferences on their behalf. Quader also served as the State Minister for Youth and Sports between 1996 and 2001.

Obaidul Quader has been alleged as one of the key perpetrators of the July massacre. He is wanted by the Bangladesh Police on charges of crimes against humanity and has been sentenced to death in absentia in 2026.

He was reported to have been seen in Kolkata, India in April 2025.

== Early life and education ==
Obaidul Quader was born on 1 January 1952 to Mosharrof Hussain and Begum Fazilatunnesa in Bara Rajapur village, in what is now Companiganj Upazila, Noakhali, Bangladesh. He has six sisters and three brothers, including Abdul Kader Mirza, the former mayor of Basurhat municipality in Companiganj. He completed his matriculation with a first division from Basurhat A. H. C. Government High School and Higher Secondary Certificate (HSC) from Noakhali Government College. He obtained a bachelor's degree in political science from the University of Dhaka.

== Career ==
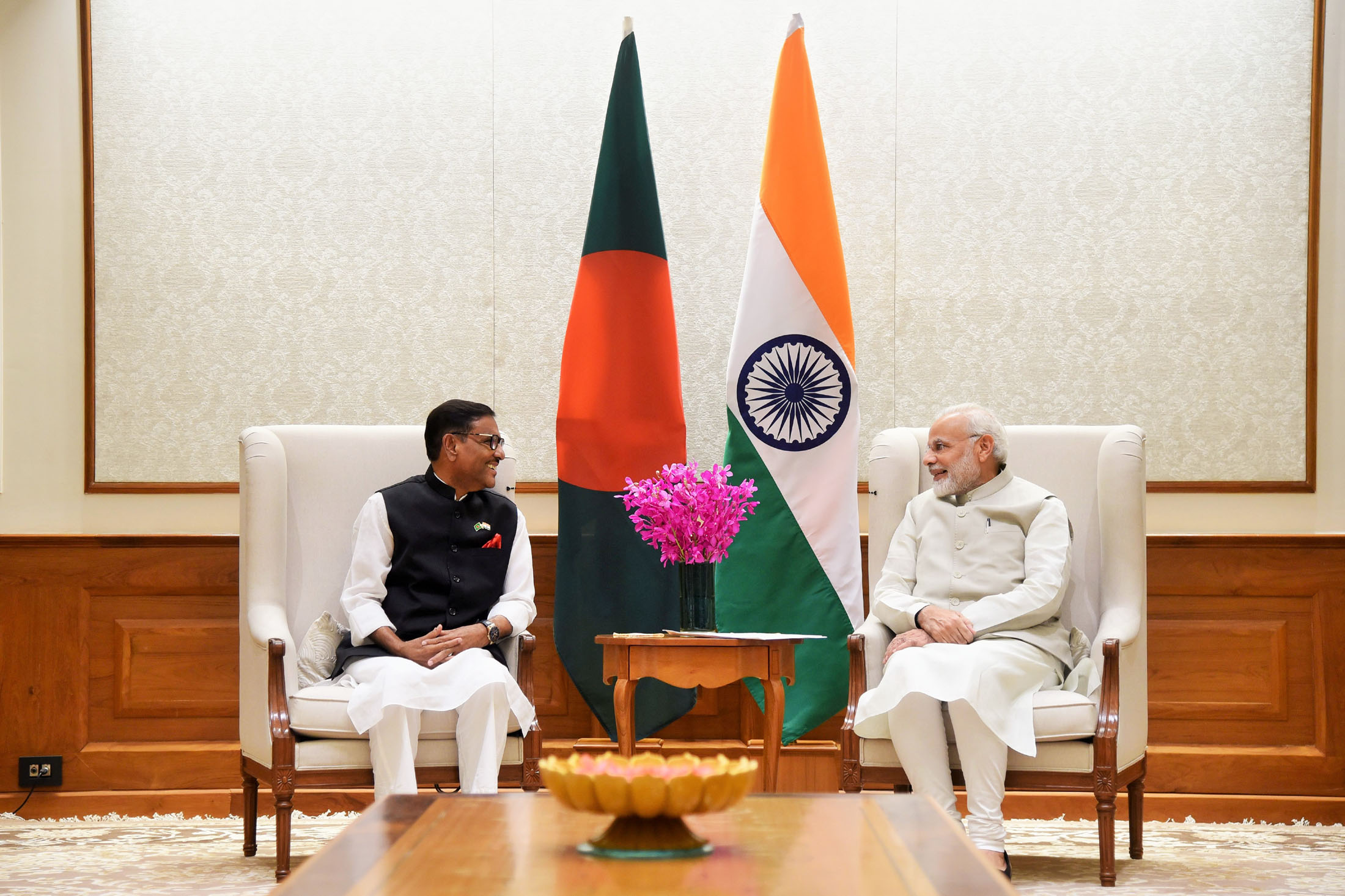
Obaidul Quader with Indian Prime Minister Narendra Modi in Delhi in April 2018.

Quader has been involved in politics since his college years. In 1966, he played an active role during the six point movement. He was also engaged in the mass uprising and the eleven-point movement in 1969. He joined the Independence War of Bangladesh as the commander of Companigonj Thana Mujib Forces. After 1975, Quader was imprisoned for two and a half years. While in prison, he was chosen as president of the central committee of the Bangladesh Chhatra League, serving two consecutive terms. He worked as the assistant editor of the newspaper Daily Banglar Bani for a long time.

Quader became a member of parliament for the constituency Noakhali-5 in the parliamentary elections of 12 June 1996. He served as State Minister of Youth, Sports, and Cultural Affairs from 23 June 1996 to 15 July 2001, and was the first senior joint general secretary of the Bangladesh Awami League from 26 December 2002 to 26 July 2009. He was arrested on 9 March 2007, by the Caretaker government of Bangladesh and remained in prison for 17 months and 26 days before being released on bail on 5 September 2008.

On 5 December 2011, Quader was appointed as Minister of Communication. He took his seat in parliament on 5 January 2014, for the Noakhali-5 constituency for the third time in the 10th parliamentary election. He became the general secretary of the Awami League in October 2016 at the party's 20th council. Quader retained the general secretary post in the Awami League's 22nd national council for a third consecutive term.

In 2018, Quader came under major criticism for his support for violently suppressing the initially peaceful 2018 Bangladesh road-safety protests and his infamous "kiss comment". His tenure as Minister of Road Transport and Bridges saw massive decline in road quality and reluctance in fixing broken roads, which were mostly left untreated and record amounts of road accidents which peaked in the year 2019 prior to COVID-19 pandemic on the following year. A total of 5,227 people, including 1,190 transport workers, lost their lives in 4,702 road accidents in the year 2019 alone. He discouraged Government accountability regarding road safety issues.

Following the fall of the Sheikh Hasina-led Awami League regime in 2024, Quader's home in Noakhali was vandalized and burned down in February 2025.

In an interview he recounted how his wife and he hid in a bathroom for five hours on the day that the government was toppled. He later stayed in Bangladesh for three months before fleeing to India.

In July 2025, Quader was accused of orchestrating a 'pay-to-talk' scheme on Telegram, monetising access to virtual meetings with Sheikh Hasina. Allegations included extracting funds from MPs and leaders, amid the party's digital regrouping following Hasina's exile.

== Bibliography ==
- Chowdhury, Kader (1976). Bangladesh: A Revolution Betrayed. Central Printing Press. p. 70.
- Quader, Obaidul. বাংলাদেশের হৃদয় হতে (From the Heart of Bangladesh) (in Bengali) (2nd printed ed.). Agamee Prakashani. ISBN 9789840419593.
- Payne, Robert (2022). পাকিস্তানের কারাগারে বঙ্গবন্ধু (Bangabandhu in Pakistani Prison) (in Bengali). Translated by Obaidul Quader (26th print ed.). Charulipi Prokashon. ISBN 9789845980241.
- Quader, Obaidul (2011). এ বিজয়ের মুকুট কোথায় (Where Is the Crown of This Victory) (in Bengali) (2nd printed ed.). Charulipi Prokashon. ISBN 9789845980296.
- Quader, Obaidul. তিন সমুদ্রের দেশে (In the Land of Three Seas) (in Bengali) (2nd ed.). Onnoprokash.
- Quader, Obaidul (2015). মেঘে মেঘে অনেক বেলা (Long Hours Beneath the Clouds) (in Bengali) (1st ed.). Panguchi.
- Quader, Obaidul (2019). রচনা সমগ্র (Collected Writings) (in Bengali) (5th ed.). Mizan Publishers.

== Controversies ==
=== Allegations of instigating conflicts and massacres ===
During the 2024 Bangladesh quota reform movement, Quader was accused of inciting violence by encouraging members of the Bangladesh Chhatra League, the student wing of the Awami League, to confront student protesters. On 15 July 2024, Quader reportedly stated that the BCL was prepared to respond to what he described as the audacity of anti-quota protesters who had demonstrated in their respective universities the previous night. On 17 July, he urged party members to remain vigilant and position themselves in every ward across the country to counter what he called the "evil efforts" of the protesters.

Reports indicate that over hundreds of individuals died during the protests that followed. In July and August 2024, a mass uprising against the Awami League regime occurred, which were met with violent suppression, reportedly resulting in the deaths of over 1,000 individuals, which is often referred to as the July massacre. On 5 August 2024, following the uprising, the government was overthrown with Prime Minister Sheikh Hasina resigning and fleeing the country.

Following the fall of the government, Quader was reported missing. On 13 August 2024, a murder complaint was filed in a Dhaka court against Quader, former Prime Minister Sheikh Hasina, and four other former government officials, alleging their involvement in the killing of a grocer during the protests on 19 July.

=== Allegations of corruption ===
Quader was arrested by the joint forces under the military-backed caretaker government on charges of corruption on 9 March 2007, and corruption charges were framed against him and his wife for accumulating wealth illegally and concealing them in income file records. He was also accused of providing fake sources of income by the Anti-Corruption Commission of Bangladesh.

In 2019, Netra News revealed that Quader has a collection of dozens of expensive wristwatches that cost tens of thousands of US dollars. Wristwatches in his possession include brands like Rolex, Ulysse Nardin and Louis Vuitton. According to the whistleblower, Quader receives watches from contractors of the megaprojects in lieu of undue favours. Obaidul Quader later accepted of owning the expensive wristwatches cited in the report to the media and claimed that the watches were gifted to him by Awami League supporters and leaders. In April 2023, in an interview with Voice of America, he admitted that he has a rich collection of wristwatches and he accepted expensive gifts from party supporters.

However, the claim of receiving expensive gifts suggests Quader has violated the Toshakhana (Maintenance and Administrative) Rules 1974. Section 4(b) of the rules mentions that the ministers can only accept gifts up to 30,000 Bangladeshi taka (equivalent to US$300) without handing them over the treasury of the government. Transparency International Bangladesh chapter raised question on his acquiring of expensive wristwatches.
