= Mostafa Kamal (volleyball) =

Bangladeshi volleyball player and footballer (1937/1938–2026)

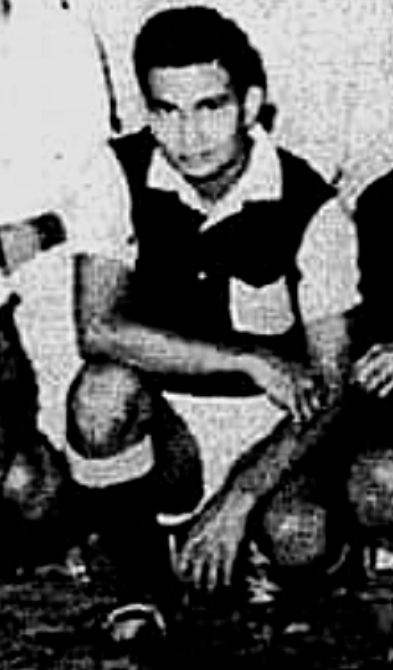
- Kamal with Dhaka Mohammedan in 1966
- Born: 1937 or 1938; Noakhali, Bengal Province, British India (present-day Bangladesh)
- Died: 1 February 2026 (aged 88); Dhaka, Bangladesh
- Volleyball career
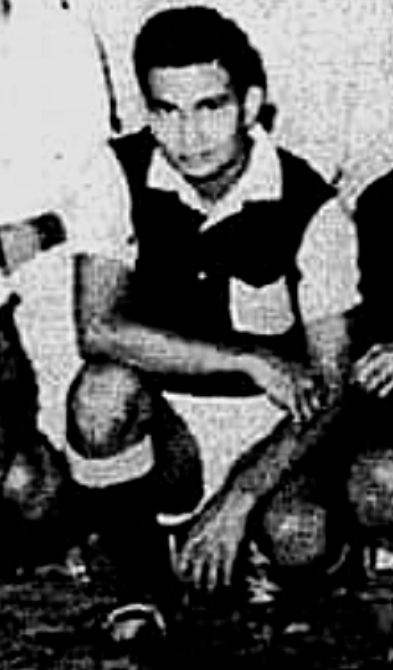

Coaching information
Previous teams coached
Years	Teams
1977–1979	Bangladesh

Career
Years	Teams
1959–1962	Jagannath College
1962–1965	Azad SC
1966–1969	Mohammedan
1970	NPB

National team
1963–1970	East Pakistan
Association football career
- Position: Outside right
Senior career*
Years	Team	Apps	(Gls)
1962–1965	Azad SC		
1966–1969	Mohammedan		
Managerial career
- 1975–1978: Sadharan Bima
- 1976–1980: Rayer Bazar
- 1984–1985: PWD SC
- * Club domestic league appearances and goals

Mostafa Kamal (Bengali: মোস্তফা কামাল; 1937 or 1938 – 1 February 2026) was a Bangladeshi professional volleyball player, footballer, coach and sports administrator.

== Early life ==
Kamal was born in Companiganj Upazila of Noakhali District, Bengal Province, British India. His uncle Sirajul Haque was a footballer for Kolkata Mohammedan, while his elder brothers Mohamed Omer and Khaled Momin played domestic football in Chittagong and Dhaka, respectively.

== Playing career ==
=== Volleyball ===
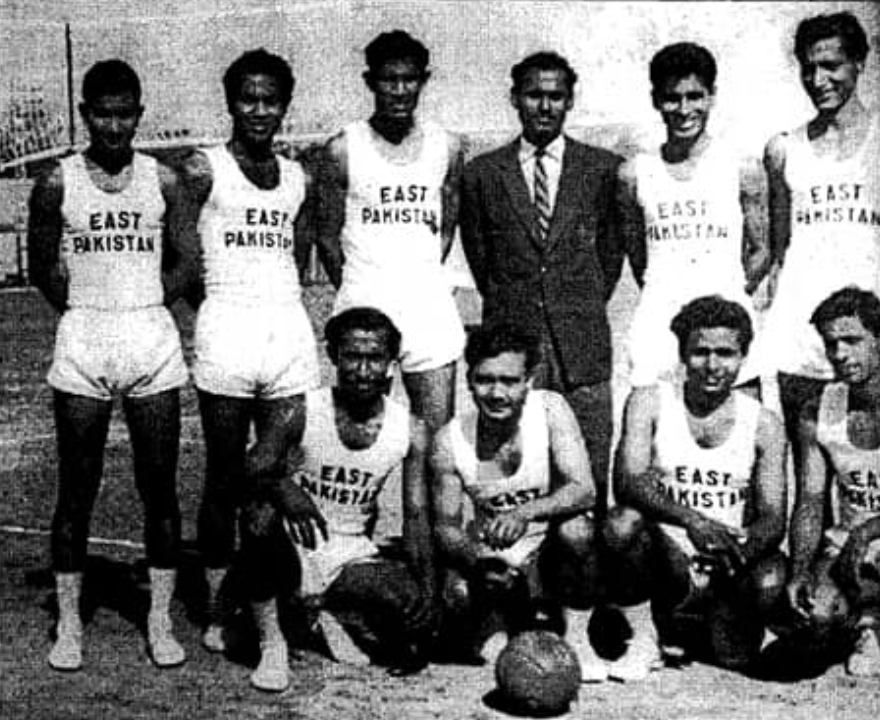
Kamal (standing first from left) with the East Pakistan volleyball team in the 1966 National Volleyball Championship in Lahore.

Kamal competed in the 400, 800, and 1500 metres in athletics while studying at Bamni High School in Noakhali and began his volleyball career after enrolling at Jagannath College in 1959. In 1961, he was scouted by Azad SC footballer and volleyball player Khondoker Abul Hasan, and went on to play for the Azad SC volleyball team until 1965, winning the Dhaka First Division Volleyball League in 1963. He joined Dhaka Mohammedan in 1966, and won the First Division League titles in 1967, 1968, and 1969, and later won the league again with National Bank of Pakistan in 1970. At the representative level, he played for the East Pakistan volleyball team in the National Volleyball Championship from 1963 to 1970 and competed in the Pakistan Olympic Games in 1964, 1966, 1968, and 1970, captaining the team in 1968. He was also called up to the Pakistan national volleyball team training camps in 1966 and 1968, though he did not make the final squads. Following the independence of Bangladesh, he captained Bangladesh Whites in the Independence Day Volleyball Championship in 1972, after which he retired from competitive volleyball.

=== Football ===
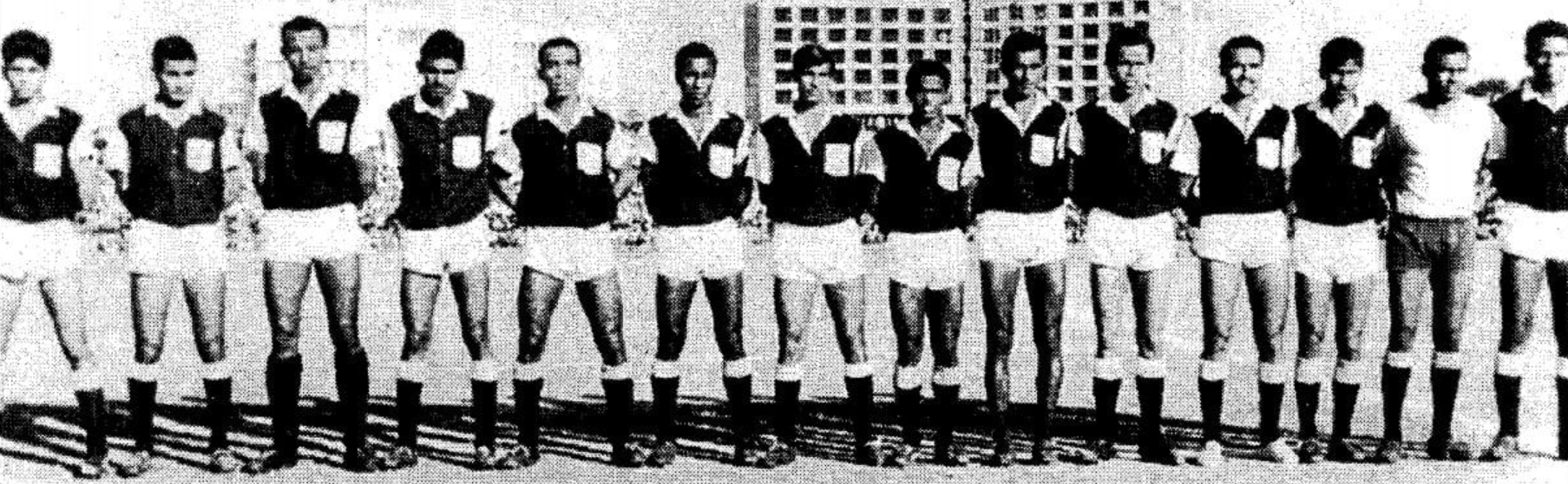
Kamal (standing second from left) with Dhaka Mohammedan prior to the 1966 Aga Khan Gold Cup final at Dhaka Stadium.

In 1958, Kamal represented eventual champions, Noakhali District, in the Inter-District Football Tournament. Kamal began his domestic football career with Azad SC in the Dhaka First Division Football League, under the recommendation of Ranjit Das. He also represented the National Bank of Pakistan football team as an employee of the bank. In 1965, he played as an outside right in the Sher-e-Bangla Memorial Tournament against Dhaka Mohammedan, scoring a brace in a 2–2 draw against the First Division champions. In 1966, he joined Mohammedan and won both the First Division and the Independence Day Football Tournament that year. He was also part of the team that finished runners-up in the Aga Khan Gold Cup. He represented Mohammedan until 1969, after which he retired due to injury.

== Post-retirement ==
Kamal coached the Bangladesh men's national volleyball team in 1977, when the team played against a touring club from the Soviet Union, and again in 1978 at the 1978 Asian Games in Bangkok, Thailand. He continued as head coach in 1979 during Bangladesh's matches against the touring Uzbekistan national team, and in 1984 led the team at the 1984 Asian Junior Men's Volleyball Championship in Riyadh, Saudi Arabia. He later served as assistant coach of the men's volleyball team at the 1987 South Asian Games and the women's team at the 1993 South Asian Games. At the domestic level, Kamal coached several clubs in the First Division Volleyball League and the Independence Day Volleyball Tournament, including WAPDA SC, Dhaka University, Bangladesh Army, Bangladesh Police and the Bangladesh Air Force, and also worked as a football coach for Sadharan Bima CSC, PWD SC and Rayer Bazar Club. In 1984, he was awarded the Sports Writers Association's Best Coach for volleyball and later served as vice-president of the Bangladesh Volleyball Federation. He was a senior member of the Bangladesh Sports Writers Association. Kamal was involved with the Player Status Committee of the Bangladesh Football Federation. He played various roles in various committees of the Bangladesh Olympic Association and the National Sports Council.

== Death ==
Kamal died at his home in Shantinagar, Dhaka, on 1 February 2026, at the age of 88.

== Honours ==
=== Volleyball ===
Azad SC

- Dhaka First Division Volleyball League: 1963

Mohammedan

- Dhaka First Division Volleyball League: 1967, 1968, 1969

National Bank of Pakistan

- Dhaka First Division Volleyball League: 1970

=== Football player ===
Noakhali District

- Inter-District Football Tournament: 1958

Mohammedan

- Dhaka First Division Football League: 1966, 1969
- Independence Day Football Tournament: 1966

=== Football coach ===
Sadharan Bima CSC

- Dhaka Second Division Football League: 1976

Rayer Bazar

- Dhaka Third Division Football League: 1980

=== Individual ===
- 1984 – Sports Writers Association's Best Coach (Volleyball)
