= Md. Wali Ullah =

Bangladeshi politician

- ওয়ালী উল্লাহ

Member of the Bangladesh Parliament for Noakhali-6
- In office 1991–1996
- Preceded by: Mohammad Ali
- Succeeded by: Mohammad Fazlul Azim

Personal details
- Born: 1936/1937
- Died: 18 May 2024 (aged 87); Dhaka, Bangladesh
- Political party: Bangladesh Awami League

Md. Wali Ullah (1936/1937 – 18 May 2024) was a Bangladesh Awami League politician and a Jatiya Sangsad member representing the Noakhali-6 constituency during 1991–1996.

== Career ==
Ullah was elected to parliament from Noakhali-6 as a Bangladesh Awami League candidate in 1991.

Ullah died in Dhaka on 18 May 2024, at the age of 87.
