= Abdur Rahman (Noakhali politician) =

Bangladeshi member of parliament for Noakhali-5 from 1973 to 1979

Member of Bangladesh Parliament
- In office 1973–1976
- Succeeded by: Moudud Ahmed

Personal details
- Born: Senbagh Upazila, Noakhali District
- Died: 1981
- Cause of death: assassinated
- Party: Bangladesh Awami League

Abdur Rahman (died 1981) was a Bangladesh Awami League politician and a member of parliament for Noakhali-5. He was a jute workers union leader.

== Early life ==
Rahman was born in Senbagh Upazila, Noakhali District, in what is now Bangladesh.

== Career ==
Rahman worked at a jute mill in Narsingdi owned by Bangladesh Jute Mills Corporation, where he was a union leader. He had founded the Pakistan Jute Mills Labour Union in the 1960s.

Rahman was elected to parliament from Noakhali-5 as an Awami League candidate in 1973. He was affiliated with Bangladesh Chatkal Sramik Federation which was aligned with the Bangladesh Krishak Sramik Awami League and went into decline after the government collapsed in 1975.

Rahman was assassinated in 1981 after attending a meeting on the Labor Act.
