= Moudud Ahmed =

Bangladeshi politician (1940–2021)

- মওদুদ আহমেদ
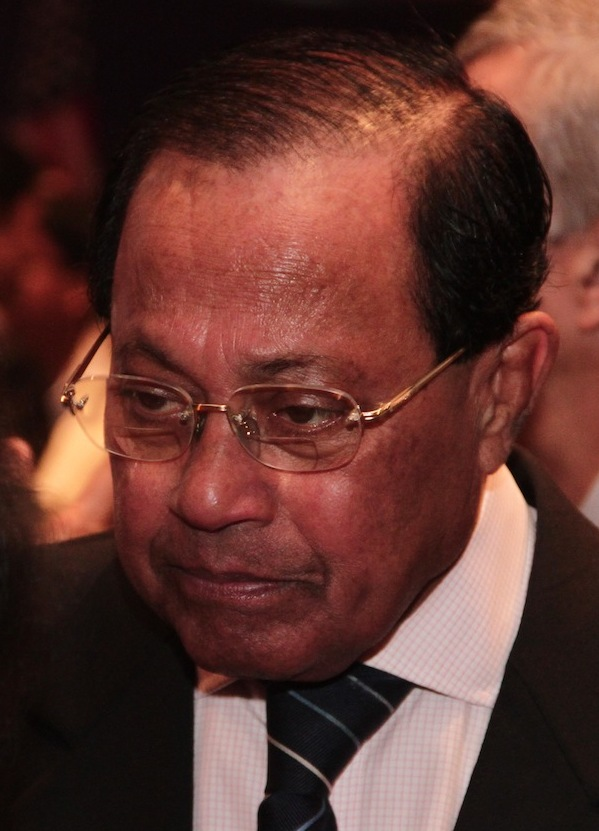
- Ahmed at U.S. Embassy Dhaka in 2012

7th Vice President of Bangladesh
- In office 12 August 1989 – 6 December 1990
- President: Hussain Muhammad Ershad
- Preceded by: A. K. M. Nurul Islam
- Succeeded by: Shahabuddin Ahmed

7th Prime Minister of Bangladesh
- In office 27 March 1988 – 12 August 1989
- President: Hussain Muhammad Ershad
- Preceded by: Mizanur Rahman Chowdhury
- Succeeded by: Kazi Zafar Ahmed

Deputy Prime Minister of Bangladesh
- In office 9 July 1986 – 27 March 1988 Serving with Kazi Zafar Ahmed (1986-1987), M. A. Matin (1986-1988), Shah Moazzem Hossain (1987-1988)
- President: Hussain Muhammad Ershad
- Prime Minister: Mizanur Rahman Chowdhury
- Preceded by: Jamal Uddin Ahmad (1982)
- Succeeded by: Kazi Zafar Ahmed
- In office 15 April 1979 – 2 January 1980 Serving with A. Q. M. Badruddoza Chowdhury (1979-1979), Jamal Uddin Ahmad (1979-1980), S. A. Bari (1979-1980)
- President: Ziaur Rahman
- Prime Minister: Shah Azizur Rahman
- Preceded by: post established
- Succeeded by: None

Minister of Law and Justice
- In office 10 October 2001 – 28 October 2006
- Prime Minister: Khaleda Zia
- Preceded by: Abdul Matin Khasru
- Succeeded by: Md. Fazlul Haque

Minister of Industries
- In office 9 July 1986 – 4 August 1990
- Preceded by: Sultan Mahmud
- Succeeded by: M. A. Sattar

Minister of Road Transport and Bridges
- In office 25 May 1986 – 9 August 1986
- Preceded by: Sultan Ahmed
- Succeeded by: Mohammed Abdul Matin
- In office 5 August 1985 – 24 March 1986
- Preceded by: Sultan Ahmed
- Succeeded by: Sultan Ahmed

Member of Parliament
- In office 10 October 2001 – 28 October 2006
- Preceded by: Obaidul Quader
- Succeeded by: Obaidul Quader
- Constituency: Noakhali-5
- In office February 1991 – March 1996
- Preceded by: Hasna Jasimuddin Moudud
- Succeeded by: Obaidul Quader
- Constituency: Noakhali-5
- In office May 1986 – February 1991
- Preceded by: Zafar Imam
- Succeeded by: Zainul Abdin Farroque
- Constituency: Noakhali-1
- In office 18 February 1979 – 24 March 1982
- Preceded by: Abdur Rahman
- Constituency: Noakhali-5

Personal details
- Born: মওদুদ আহমেদ; 24 May 1940 Companiganj, Bengal, British India
- Died: 16 March 2021 (aged 80) Singapore General Hospital, Singapore
- Party: Bangladesh Nationalist Party (1978–1984), (1996-2021)
- Other political affiliations: Jatiya Party (1984–1996)
- Spouse: Hasna Jasimuddin Moudud
- Education: University of Dhaka; Lincoln's Inn

Moudud Ahmed (Bengali: মওদুদ আহমেদ; 24 May 1940 – 16 March 2021) was a Bangladeshi lawyer and politician. He was a standing committee member of the Bangladesh Nationalist Party. Ahmed was elected as a Jatiya Sangsad member five times from the Noakhali-1 and Noakhali-5 constituencies.

Ahmed served as the post master general of Bangladesh after independence. Since the 1980s, he held numerous political offices for short stints in the government of Bangladesh, including Deputy Prime Minister (1979–1980 and 1986–1988), Prime Minister of Bangladesh (1988–1989), Vice President of Bangladesh (1989–1990), and Minister of Law, Justice and Parliamentary Affairs (2001–2006).

== Early life and career ==
Ahmed was born on 24 May 1940 to a Bengali Muslim family of Bhuiyans in the village of Manikpur in Noakhali District, Bengal Province. He was the sixth child of Maulana Momtazuddin Ahmad and Begum Ambia Khatun. His father was a leading Islamic scholar of Hadith who taught at Calcutta Alia Madrasa, Presidency College, Calcutta and Dacca University. Ahmed obtained his BA and MA in political science from the University of Dacca. He was called to the English Bar at Lincoln's Inn in London in 1966.

While in the UK, Ahmed was part of a growing intellectual movement among East Pakistani students in envisioning an independent Bangladesh. After returning to Dacca, he joined the legal team of Sheikh Mujibur Rahman during the Agartala Conspiracy Case trial in 1968. He accompanied the Bengali delegation led by Sheikh Mujib to the Rawalpindi Round Table Conference with Field Marshal Ayub Khan in 1969. Ahmed witnessed many important developments in the run up to Bangladesh's independence. He joined the Provisional Government of Bangladesh in Calcutta during the Bangladesh War of Independence. He worked in its External Publicity Division.

Ahmed was one of the founding members of the 33 member Committee for Civil Liberties and Legal Aid which was established to protect the opposition politicians and members of civil society who were facing the wrath of the government on 31 March 1974. Ahmed was the first Postmaster General of Bangladesh Post Office after the Independence of Bangladesh.

Ahmed was jailed on orders from Sheikh Mujibur Rahman in December 1974, but was later released.

== BNP and Jatiya Party ==
In the late 1970s, Ahmed was courted by Maj General Ziaur Rahman, the first directly elected president of Bangladesh but who was at the time CMLA behind President Chief Justice Abu Sadat Mohammad Sayem. Between 1976 and 1978, he served as Deputy Prime Minister. In 1977, he led the Bangladeshi delegation to the United Nations General Assembly. He was elected to parliament from the Bangladesh Nationalist Party (BNP) in 1979. Ahmed's feud with Shah Azizur Rahman led to him being sacked by Zia.

In 1985, Ahmed joined the newly formed Jatiya Party of Lt General Hussain Muhammad Ershad. He was appointed again as Deputy Prime Minister in the cabinet and held the portfolios of the Industries Ministry and the Communications Ministry. President Ershad appointed Ahmed as Prime Minister in 1988. Serving for a year in the office of premier, he oversaw relief operations during the catastrophic 1988 Bangladesh flood. Ahmed was invited for talks with several Western leaders, including with Margaret Thatcher at 10 Downing Street. However, Ershad replaced Ahmed with the pro-Chinese Left-winger Kazi Zafar Ahmed in 1989. Ahmed was elevated to the post of Vice President of Bangladesh in 1989. He resigned in December 1990 to make way for Justice Shahabuddin Ahmed to become acting president and lead the transition to parliamentary democracy.

After serving a stint in prison following Ershad's ousting, Ahmed was invited by Khaleda Zia to return to the BNP in 1996. He was elected to parliament while in jail in 1996. He was reelected for the fifth time in 2001. Begum Zia appointed him as Minister of Law, Justice and Parliamentary Affairs in 2001.

In 2007, the military-backed caretaker government arrested Ahmed on charges of illegal alcohol possession. But the case was dismissed at the Supreme Court in 2008. After his release from prison, Ahmed received a jubilant reception at his constituency in Noakhali. He was not reelected to parliament in 2008. He was arrested again in 2013 by the Awami League government. His family told The Guardian that the country was turning into a prison under Prime Minister Sheikh Hasina.

Ahmed joined his party in boycotting the 2014 general election.

Under the Awami League administration, Ahmed and his brother Monzur faced charges of illegally occupying their properties in the posh Gulshan area of Dhaka. They maintained that the case was politically motivated. On 8 June 2017, he was evicted from his house by Rajdhani Unnayan Kartripakkha. Ahmed described his eviction as "political vengeance" by the Awami League government. Former Prime Minister and chairperson of Bangladesh Nationalist Party, Khaleda Zia, condemned the move to evict him. He had lived in the house for more than 40 years.

== Personal life and family ==
Ahmed was married to Hasna Jasimuddin Moudud, a daughter of the Bengali poet Jasimuddin. They raised a daughter, poet Ana Kashfiya Moudud. Their eldest son, Asif Momtaz Moudud, died at the age of 3. Another son, Aman Momtaj Moudud, died of dengue fever in 2015.

Ahmed was a practicing barrister in the Supreme Court of Bangladesh. He was a fellow at Heidelberg University in Germany and a visiting fellow at Harvard University in the United States. In the fall of 1997, he was the Bland Visiting Professor at George Washington University's Elliott School of International Affairs. He was also a member of the Elliott School's International Council.

== Death ==
On 30 December 2020, Ahmed was hospitalized in Dhaka due to a decrease in haemoglobin levels and eventually suffered a stroke. A few weeks later, a pacemaker was implanted.

Ahmed was hospitalized for pulmonary congestion and kidney complications in Singapore on 1 February 2021. He died a month later on 16 March at the age of 80.

On 12 March 2022, Ahmed's wife, Hasna Jasimuddin Moudud, claimed that Ahmed was assassinated.

== Publications ==
Ahmed is the author of Twelve books. Publications include:

- Shongshod-e Ja Bolechhi, Dhaka: The University Press Limited, 2006, ISBN 984-05-0278-6
- South Asia: Crisis of Development-The Case of Bangladesh, Dhaka: The University Press Limited, 2003
- Democracy and the Challenge of Development: a Study of Politics and Military Interventions in Bangladesh, Dhaka: The University Press Limited, 1995
- Bangladesh: Era of Sheikh Mujibur Rahman, Dhaka: The University Press Limited, 1983, ISBN 3-515-04266-0
- Bangladesh: Constitutional Quest for Autonomy, South Asian Institute of Heidelberg University, 1976 and University Press Limited, Dhaka, 1979
- Chaloman Itihas, the book to inform the next generation the history of the country particularly the history of HM Ershad government.
