= Hasna Jasimuddin Moudud =

Bangladeshi politician

Member of Parliament for Noakhali-5
- In office 10 July 1986 – 6 December 1990
- Preceded by: Moudud Ahmed
- Succeeded by: Moudud Ahmed

Spouse of the Prime Minister of Bangladesh
- In office 27 March 1988 – 12 August 1989
- Prime Minister: Moudud Ahmed
- Preceded by: Begum Sajeda Mizan Chowdhury
- Succeeded by: Momtaz Begum

Personal details
- Born: 1943 (age 82–83)
- Spouse: Moudud Ahmed (died 2021)
- Children: 3 (2 deceased)
- Parent: Jasimuddin (father)
- Education: University of Dhaka; University of Dayton
- Occupation: Writer and environmentalist

Hasna Jasimuddin Moudud is a Bangladeshi writer, environmentalist and a retired politician who served as a Jatiya Sangsad member representing the Noakhali-5 constituency in the 3rd and 4th parliament during 1986–1990.

== Family ==
Hasna was born to poet Jasimuddin (1903–1976) and Begum Mamtaz Jasimuddin (d. 2006). Her siblings include Kamal Anwar, Jamal Anwar, Firoz Anwar, Khurshid Anwar and Asma Ilahi. Hasna was married to Moudud Ahmed, a Bangladesh Nationalist Party politician and former Vice President and Prime Minister of Bangladesh until his death in 2021. Hasna's eldest son, Asif Momtaz Moudud, died at the age of 3. Her second son, Aman Momtaj Moudud, died of dengue fever in 2015.

== Education ==
Moudud completed her bachelor's from the University of Dhaka in 1965 and master's from the University of Dayton in 1969.

== Career ==
Moudud was elected as the chairperson of 2015-2016 Bangladesh National Committee of International Union for Conservation of Nature members. She is currently a Mittal Institute Research Affiliate and a former Senior Fellow at the Harvard University Asia Center.

Moudud published a book, Mystic Poetry of Bangladesh, in 2017 and Where Women Rule: South Asia.

== Awards ==
- Anannya Top Ten Award (2004)
