= Abdul Hannan Masud =

Bangladeshi politician (born 2000)

- আব্দুল হান্নান মাসউদ
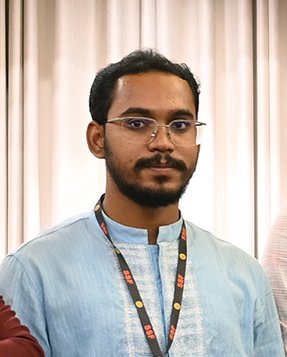
- Masud in 2025

Member of Parliament
- Incumbent
- Assumed office 17 February 2026
- Preceded by: Mohammad Ali
- Constituency: Noakhali-6

Senior Joint Chief Coordinator of National Citizen Party
- Incumbent
- Assumed office 28 February 2025
- Convener: Nahid Islam
- Chief Coordinator: Nasiruddin Patwary

Personal details
- Born: Abdul Hannan Masud; 1 January 2000 (age 26) Hatiya, Noakhali, Bangladesh
- Party: National Citizen Party
- Spouse: Shyamoli Sultana Jedni (m. 2025)
- Education: University of Dhaka
- Occupation: Politician
- Known for: Coordinator of the Students Against Discrimination in the 2024 Bangladesh quota reform movement

Abdul Hannan Masud (Bengali: আব্দুল হান্নান মাসউদ; born 1 January 2000) is a Bangladeshi student leader and former coordinator of the Students Against Discrimination, which led the July Revolution. He is the Senior Joint Chief Coordinator of the National Citizen Party. In the 13th Bangladesh general election, he was elected from Noakhali-6 (Hatiya) and become the youngest member of parliament in history of Bangladesh at the age of 26.

== Early life and education ==
Masud was born on 1 January 2000 in Burirchar Union of Hatiya Upazila, Noakhali District.

Masud is currently a third-year student enrolled in an honours (undergraduate) programme at the University of Dhaka.

== Activism ==
Abdul Hannan Masud is involved in student and political activism in Bangladesh, focusing on democratic reform, regional development, and political mobilization.

Masud gained national attention through his involvement in student-led political activism. He has participated in and helped organize political campaigns and protests related to governance and democratic reforms in Bangladesh. At political events and public rallies, he has advocated for democratic governance and citizen participation, emphasizing the importance of strengthening democratic institutions in the country.

In 2025, he was injured during clashes between activists of rival political groups in Hatiya. The incident led to protests and demonstrations by party supporters demanding action against those responsible. The demonstrations were organized in Dhaka by supporters protesting the incident and calling for legal action.

== Political career ==
He contested the 13th Bangladesh general election from Noakhali-6 under the nomination of the National Citizen Party and the 11-party electoral alliance, which was led by Bangladesh Jamaat-e-Islami. He was unofficially elected after receiving 90,118 votes.

== Personal life ==
His father Amirul Islam Mohammad Abdul Malek is involved with agriculture.

In 2025, Masud married to Shyamoli Sultana Jadni, a former leader of the Bangladesh Ganatantrik Chhatra Sangsad, the student wing of NCP.
