= Nijhum Dwip =

Small island in Noakhali District, Bangladesh

- Nijhum Island
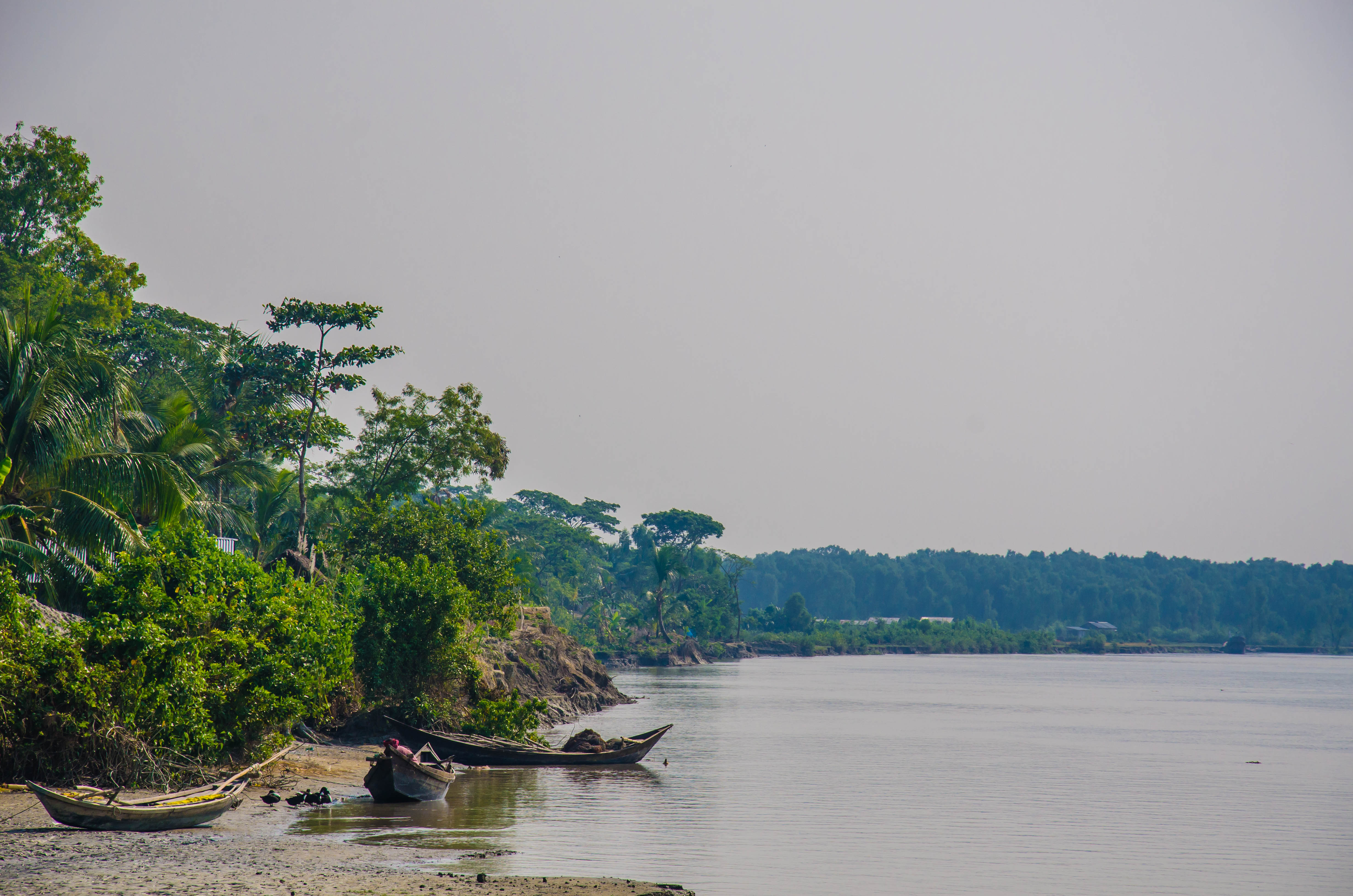

- Location within Bangladesh
- Coordinates: 22°3′48.82″N 91°0′38.69″E
- Country: Bangladesh
- Administrative District: Noakhali District

Area
  - Total: 163.45 km^{2} (63.11 sq mi)
  - Land: 38.65 km^{2} (14.92 sq mi)
  - Water: 124.81 km^{2} (48.19 sq mi)

Population (2016)
  - Total: 25,000
- Time zone: UTC+6 (BST)

Nijhum Dwip (Bengali: নিঝুম দ্বীপ, lit. 'Silent Island') is a small island under Hatiya upazila. It is situated in Noakhali District in Bangladesh. In was historically called Char Osmani, Baluar Char, Golden Island.

A cluster of islands (mainly, Ballar Char, Kamlar Char, Char Osman and Char Muri) emerged in the early 1950s as an alluvium in the shallow estuary of the Bay of Bengal on the south of Noakhali. These new sandbanks first drew the notice of a group of fishermen, who named it Baular Char (literally, the alluvium of sand) later transformed into Ballar Char. Occupying an area of 14,050 acres (5,686 hectares), the island is situated between 21 0 1 / to 22 0 6 /North latitude and 90 0 3 / to 91 0 4 / East longitude

Migratory Birds in Nijhum Dwip: During winter, thousands of migratory birds flock in to island. The fishermen use the airy and sunny land as an ideal place for drying their catches from the sea. Sometimes many of them also construct straw huts on the island as seasonal residences.

In 1974 the Forest Department took an afforestation program for a duration of twenty years in the north side of the island. Covering an area of nine thousand acres, it has now developed into a deep forest with a variety of plant species. Among the trees Keora is much seen. Besides this Gewa, Kankra, Bain, Babul, Karamja, Pashur and many other species are seen.

On 8 April 2001 the government declared the 40,390 acres (16,345 ha) of forest of Jahajmara range including 9,550 acres (3,865 ha) of forest land on Nijhum Dwip as a National Park for the protection and development of the biodiversity of the forest. But in practice, there a very lazy appearance of that declaration.

It was named 'Nijhum Dwip' by former Minister Amirul Islam Kalam in 1975 observing its isolation and mild nature.

== Population ==
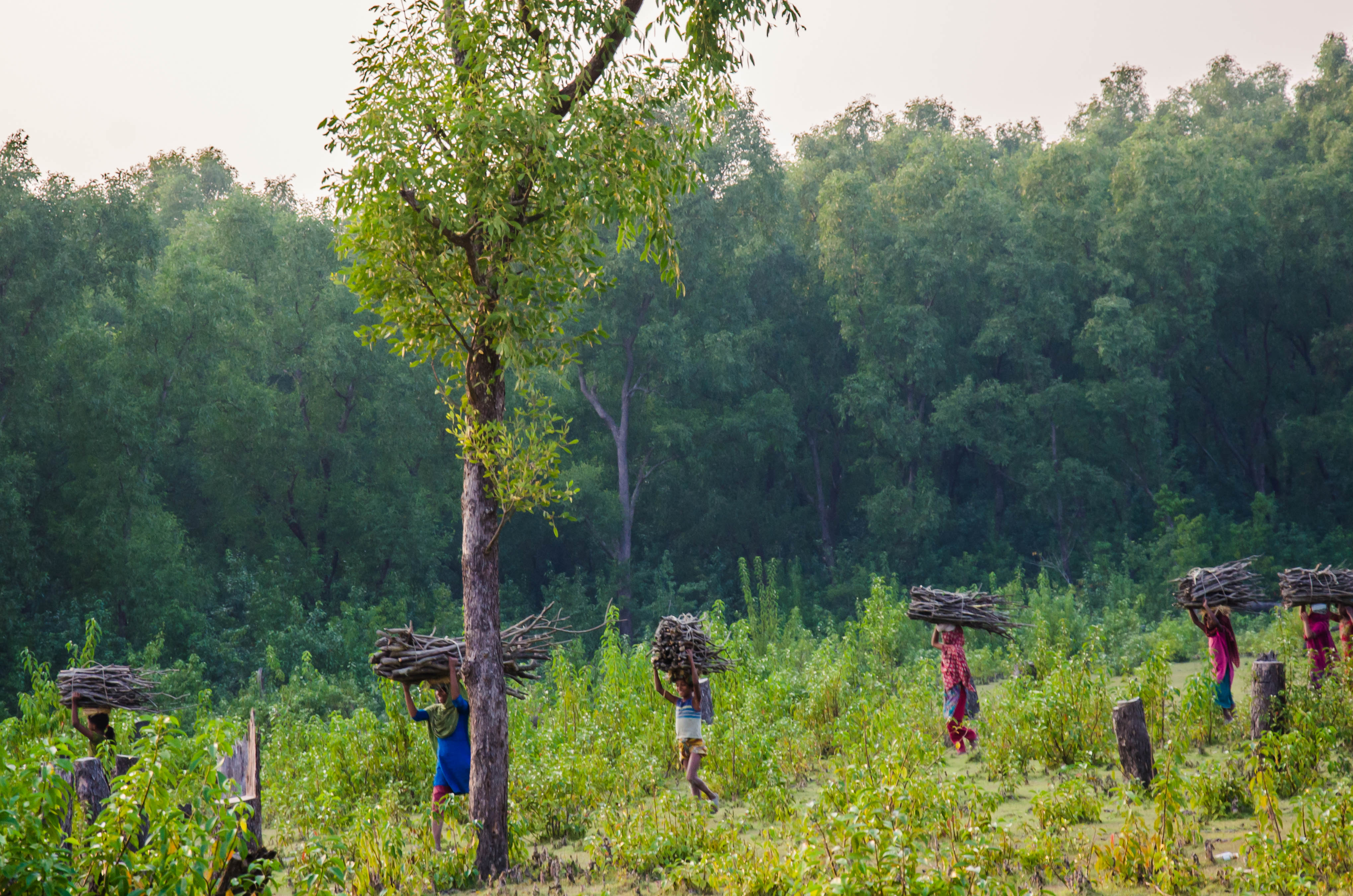
Life at Nijhum Dwip.

The population in Nijhum Dwip in 2016 was 25,000. Their main occupations are cultivation, fishing and livestock farming. The island produces vegetables. But the island suffers from natural calamities, which can affect the local economy and people.

== Current status ==
Nijhum Dwip presently has six big bazaars that mainly consist of grocery shops, small restaurants and drug stores. These bazaars are the only places in the islands to have electricity from generators. More than eight thousand inhabitants found their permanent settlement in the island and their occupations are mainly cultivation and fishing. There are some NGO's and other organisations like Proshika, Human Development Centre and JAICA who are involved with their development projects on this island.

== Accommodation ==
While in Nijhum Dwip one can stay at any of several hotels. Some of them have electricity supplied by generators. Bangladesh Parjatan Corporation also has a hotel in the island.

== Flora and fauna ==
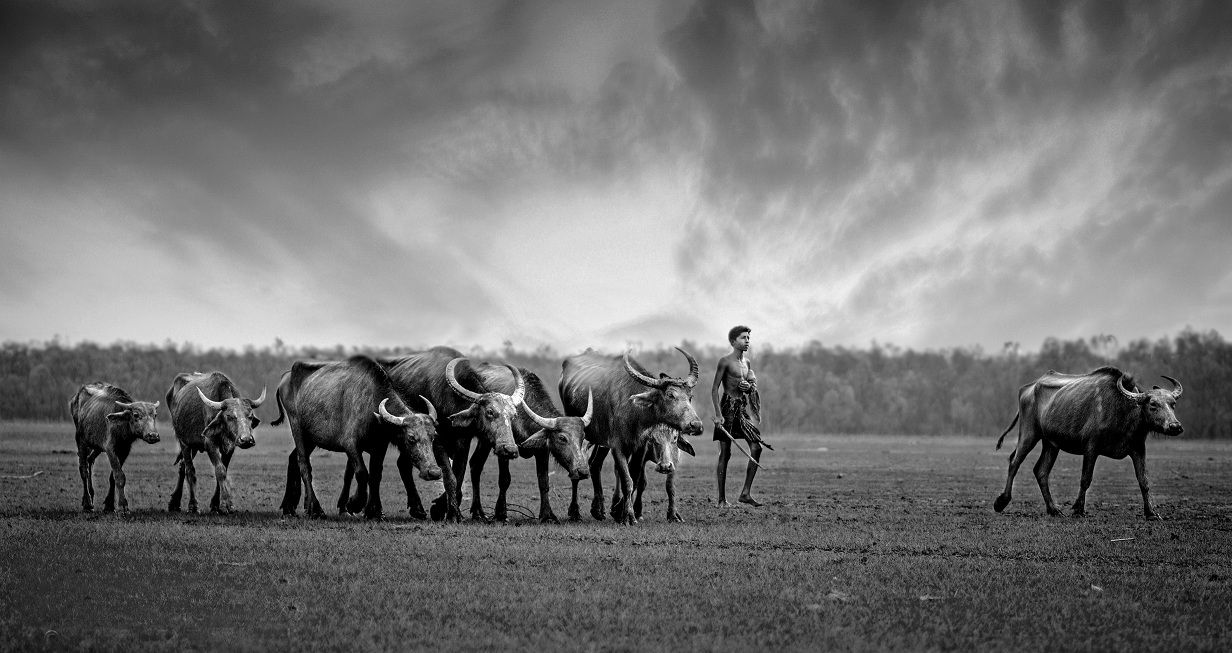
Domestic Buffalo Herd at Nijhum Dwip

The forest department of the government of Bangladesh created mangrove forests in Nijhum Dwip and the main attraction in these forests is the herd of about 5000 chital or spotted deer. The most common type of planted tree species in the island is Keora, also known as Kerfa, which has fast growing roots holding the sandy land. The plant also supplies pillars for houses, materials for making boats and agricultural implements, and fuel for domestic use. In 2001, the government of Bangladesh declared the forest area as Nijhum Dwip National Park in the year 2001. Now this island has been declared as the unique eco-touristic spot for its ideal natural setup with the rich bio-diversification factors and the perennial mangrove forest with wild animals like spotted deer, wild boar, fishing cat and rhesus macaque and for the ideal habitat for fish resources. The waters nearby was declared as the Nijhum Dwip Marine Protected Area in 2019. Since south coast is open to the mouth of a great span of Bay of Bengal, whales were sometimes seen though very rare nowadays.

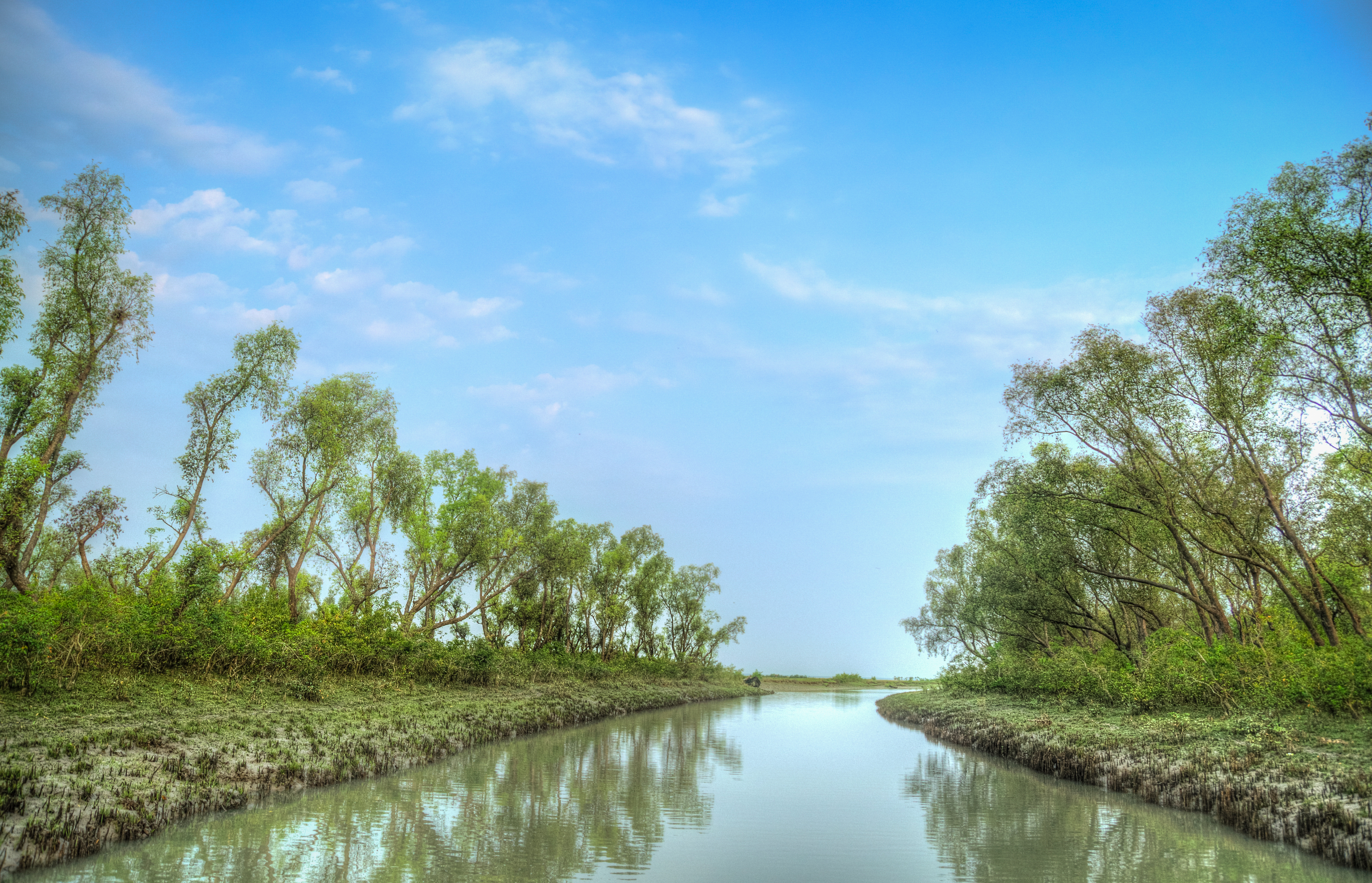
On the way to 'Chowdhury Khal', Nijhum Dwip
