= Hatiya Municipality =

Hatiya Municipality হাতিয়া পৌরসভা
- Town
- Location within Bangladesh
- Coordinates (right): 22.3667°N 91.1250°E
- Country: Bangladesh
- Division: Chattogram
- District: Noakhali
- Upazila: Hatiya
- Established: 2005

Government
  - Type: Mayor - Councilor
  - Body: Hatiya Municipality
  - Mayor: A K M Euchup Ali

Area
  - Total: 35 km^{2} (14 sq mi)

Population
  - Total: 65,000
  - Density: 1,900/km^{2} (4,800/sq mi)
- Time zone: UTC+6 (BST)
- Postal code: 3890

Hatiya Municipality mahallah geocode map

Hatiya Municipality is the largest municipality by area in Bangladesh. It is located in Hatiya Upazila and was established in 2005.

== Administration ==
The municipality is subdivided into 3 mouzas, 9 wards and 23 mahallas.

== Facilities ==
The municipality has around 52 mosques.

List of mosques
Mosque	Ward	Imam
Sufi Taj Jame Mosque	Ward 8	Mawlana Muddathir Husayn
Hazera Bayt an-Nur Jame Mosque	Ward 8	Mawlana Ataur Rahman
Chowmuhani Bazar Jame Mosque	Ward 9	Mawlana Abu Haniya
Shunnechar Bayt al-Aman Jame Mosque	Ward 7	Muhammad Abu Bakr Siddiq
Sayyidia Bazar Jame Mosque		Mizanur Rahman
Ashraf Ali Miah Jame Mosque		Munirul Islam
Altaf Haji Bazar Jame Mosque		Muhammad Yunus
Masjid-e-Salma	Ward 6	Mawlana Ibrahim
Oskhali North Bazar Jame Mosque	Ward 6	Hafiz Muhammad Irshad
Bayt al-Maʿmur Jame Mosque	Ward 6	Muhammad Masum Billah
Bayt an-Nur Jame Mosque	Ward 6	Muhammad Munir Ahmad
Hatiya City Jame Mosque	Ward 6	Muhammad Uthman Ghani
Bara Miah Bazar Jame Mosque	Ward 6	Mawlana Mafiz
AM High School Jame Mosque	Ward 6	Mawlana Yusuf
Darul Arkan Jame Mosque		Saiful Islam
Haji Maqsudul Haq Jame Mosque		Imdadul Haq Didar
Hatiya Upazila Jame Mosque	Ward 5	Mawlana Abdul Qadir Masluddin
Hatiya Police Jame Mosque	Ward 5	Muhammad Shakhawat Husayn
Hil Ful Fuzul Jame Mosque	Ward 5	Muhammad Jamshed Uddin
Moulvi Bazar Jame Mosque	Ward 5	Muhammad Hafiz Ahmad
Upazila Council Jame Mosque		Muhammad Ziaul Haq
Gedu Miah Jame Mosque		Muhammad Abdul Qadir
Rahmania Madrasa Jame Mosque		Muhammad Hilal Uddin
Haji Ismail Jame Mosque	Ward 4	Mawlana Shamsul Huda
Haji Mukhtar Ali Jame Mosque	Ward 4	Mawlana Abul Kalam
Haji Nur az-Zaman Jame Mosque	Ward 4	Mawlana Uthman
Haji Ismail Jame Mosque	Ward 4	Mawlana Shamsul Huda
Rashid Miah Panjegana Mosque	Ward 4	Mawlana Hilal ad-Din
Char Kailash Jame Mosque	Ward 3	Mawlana Kifayat Ullah
Oskhali Bazar Jame Mosque	Ward 3	Mawlana Shah-e-Alam
Oskhali North Bazar Jame Mosque	Ward 3	Mawlana Hafiz Ilyas Sahib
Char Ishwar UP Jame Mosque	Ward 3	Mawlana Mahmudul Hasan
Hawladar Jame Mosque	Ward 3	Mawlana Mubarak Husayn
Muzaffar Ahmad Jame Mosque	Ward 3	Mawlana Amjad Husayn
Madrasa Pora Jame Mosque	Ward 3	Mawlana Muhammad Ullah
Haji Rukn Ali Jame Mosque	Ward 4	Mawlana Abdul Alim
Bayt al-Haji Mujibullah Haq Mosque	Ward 6	Mawlana Hafiz Mahsum
Waliullah Supani's Mosque	Ward 1	Mawlana Saidul Haq
Haji Muhammad Ali Madrasa Jame Mosque	Ward 1	Mawlana Abdur Rahman
San Miah Patwari Jame Mosque	Ward 1	Mawlana Maulvi Ibrahim
Baitul Aman Jame Mosque	Ward 1	Mawlana Najmul Huda
Khabir Miah's Bazar Jame Mosque	Ward 1	Mawlana Anwar Husayn
Mukhlis Farazi Jame Mosque	Ward 1	Mawlana Abdurrohoman
Mother Aisha Panjegana Mosque	Ward 1	Mawlana Abd ar-Rahman
Zayb an-Nisa Begam Panjegana Mosque	Ward 1	Mawlana Hafiz Shihabuddin
Mah-e-Ara Jame Mosque	Ward 2	Mawlana Abdul Hayy
Al-Amin Jame Mosque	Ward 2	Mawlana Jubayr Husayn
Sawdagar Jame Mosque	Ward 2	Mawlana Haji Mustafizur Rahman
Islamia Madrasa Jame Mosque	Ward 2	Mawlana Muzahir Uddin
Azhar al-Ulum Madrasa Jame Mosque	Ward 2	Mawlana Nisar Uddin
Haji Siddiq Ahmad Jame Mosque	Ward 2	Mawlana Shahin Alam
Chan Miah Jame Mosque	Ward 2	Mawlana Jafar Ahmad
Siraj al-Haq Jame Mosque	Ward 2	Mawlana Khabir Uddin
