= Basurhat A. H. C. Government High School =

- বসুরহাট এ. এইচ. সি. সরকারী উচ্চ বিদ্যালয়

Location
- Basurhat, Companiganj; Bangladesh; 22.8741°N 91.2799°E

Information
- Established: 1911
- Founder: Abdul Halim
- School board: Board of Intermediate and Secondary Education, Comilla
- School district: Noakhali
- Principal: Sheikh Sayeedur Ar Rahman
- Faculty: 30+
- Grades: 6-10

Basurhat A. H. C. Government High School is a secondary school located in Basurhat municipality, Companiganj Upazila, Noakhali District, Bangladesh. Established in 1911, it is the oldest high school in Companiganj.

The elaboration of A.H.C. is Abdul Halim Coronation. Mr. Abdul Halim was the great founder and proposer of this school. Abdul Halim was the sub-registrar of the Basurhat sub-registry office. When Companiganj had no educational institution, he needed to establish a school. Consequently, Mr. Abdul Halim established Basurhat A.H.C. High School and Ramgonj Coronation High School. Moulobi Emdad Ullah helped Mr. Halim very cordially to establish the school. He donated the land for the school. They made the school fund by collecting donation from the people. The school got the status of a governmental school in 1972.
