= Mohammad Fazlul Azim =

Bangladeshi politician

- মোহাম্মদ ফজলুল আজিম
- Born: 21 February 1945 (age 81); Noakhali, Bengal
- Education: Bangladesh University of Engineering and Technology (1965, B.Sc)
- Occupations: Industrialist and politician
- Years active: 1975–present
- Political party: Bangladesh Nationalist Party
- Children: Two sons and one daughter
- Website: azimgroup.com

Mohammad Fazlul Azim (born 1945) is a Bangladeshi industrialist, business magnate and politician. He is the chairman of Azim Group, a leading industrial conglomerate and exporter in Bangladesh with business concerns in garments, steel, engineering, agro and various other sectors. He last served as an independent member of parliament of the Jatiya Sangsad. Azim was the only independent lawmaker in the parliament during the 9th Jatiya Sangsad. He also served in the parliament from the Bangladesh Nationalist Party.

== Education ==
Azim completed his high school education at Noakhali Zilla School. Azim is a graduate of Bangladesh University of Engineering and Technology. He graduated in 1965 and earned his Bachelor of Science degree in mechanical engineering.

== Career ==
=== Business ===
Azim is a pioneer in Bangladesh's ready-made garments industries. He founded Azim Group in 1975. Azim Group started the second organized garment factory of Bangladesh in January 1980, making Azim is one of the most seasoned entrepreneur in Bangladesh Garment Industry's history.

The first factory of Azim Group was Azim Mannan Garments Ltd., which was named after Azim himself and his former partner Major (Retd) Abdul Mannan MP. In 2014, Azim Group's garments division had an export turnover of over US$220 million. Azim Group now has 23 garments factories and 3 backward linkage factories and employs around 28,000 people. Azim Group has a global presence with offices in Dhaka and Chattogram together with a sourcing and marketing hub in Hong Kong and liaison offices in New York City and Los Angeles. The group is also involved in various other sectors including engineering consultancy, steel, agro, real estate, packaging and paper. In 2018, Azim expanded into steel manufacturing and formed a new company - Global Steel & Engineering Ltd (GSEL), which is involved in producing transmission line hardware materials and other kinds of steel sheets. GSEL was inaugurated by Tawfiq-e-Elahi Chowdhury, Power, Energy and Mineral Resources Adviser to the Prime Minister.

Azim also served as vice-president of the Bangladesh Garment Manufacturers and Exporters Association (BGMEA), the largest trade association in the country representing the ready-made garment industry, particularly the woven garments, knitwear and sweater sub-sectors with equal importance. Initially, Azim established BGMEA-Chittagong, a separate entity from BGMEA-Dhaka. He served as the first President of BGMEA-Chittagong. However, the Director of Trade Organization at the time advised that one association was better than two and Azim agreed. Then BGMEA-Dhaka and BGMEA-Chittagong were merged to become the BGMEA today. Azim is also one of the co-authors of the constitution of the present BGMEA. In 1984, Azim represented BGMEA as the lone representative in the first Wage Board meeting. The first ever workers' union in Bangladesh RMG sector was established in a factory owned by the Azim Group in 1981.

Azim is also a former member of Privatization Commission, former Member of National Minimum Wage Board, former Member of National Labour Law Commission, former Member of National Export Council.

In 2018, Azim was part of a high-level business delegation led by then Commerce Minister of Bangladesh, Tofail Ahmed, for a three-day visit to Cambodia. The delegation attended a bilateral meeting with business leaders from Cambodia, headed by the Cambodian Commerce Minister.

Azim was awarded Best Entrepreneur medal in 2003 by the Institution of Engineers, Bangladesh (IEB) in recognition of his outstanding performance, service to the Engineering profession as well as his valuable contributions towards the enhancement of enterprises.

=== Politics ===
Azim is a former member of parliament (MP) of Bangladesh. He was first elected as an MP from the constituency Noakhali-6 in the 1996 Bangladeshi general election under the Bangladesh Nationalist Party (BNP). However, in the 2001 general election he came in third and was not reelected.

For the 2008 Bangladeshi general election, Azim ran as an independent candidate as he did not receive the party ticket from BNP. Yet he still won, making him the only independent lawmaker in the parliament during the 2008–2014 term. Azim represented Bangladesh as a Parliament delegate in several international forums, including giving speeches at the Asian Human Rights Council (AHRC).

Alongside his role as an MP, Azim was a member of the Standing Committee on Ministry of Water Resources and the Standing Committee on Ministry of Textile & Jute. In 2018, Azim announced his interest to participate in the 2018 general election and he received the nomination from the BNP to compete for Noakhali-6. In his political career, he served as an MP for three terms. In 2026 general election, he run for Noakhali-6 as an independent candidate and lost to National Citizen Party candidate Abdul Hannan Masud who received 91,899 votes. He came third in position with 4,783 votes, behind BNP candidate Mohammad Mahbuber Rahman 64,021 votes.

== Legacy ==
Azim has an all-female college under his name called Prokousholi Mohammad Fazlul Azim Mohila College. The college is located in Mohammad Fazlul Azim's hometown Hatiya which is in Noakhali District.
