= Shakil Ahmed =

Shakil Ahmed may refer to:

== Military personnel ==
- Shakil Ahmed (general, died 2009), 16th Director General of Bangladesh Rifles
- Shakil Ahmed (general, born 1968), 22nd Director General of Border Guard Bangladesh

== Sportsmen ==
- Shakil Ahmed (footballer, born 1988), Bangladeshi national footballer
- Shakil Ahmed (footballer, born 1994), Bangladeshi footballer
- Shakil Ahmed (sport shooter) (born 1995), Bangladeshi sport shooter
- Shakil Ahmed (cricketer) (born 1966), Pakistani Test cricketer

== Others ==
- Shakil Ahmed (journalist) Bangladeshi journalist
- Shakil Ahmed, one of the perpetrators of the 1993 Bombay bombings

== See also ==
- Shakeel Ahmed (disambiguation)
