= Mirpur Road =

Road in Dhaka, Bangladesh

N501
- Mirpur Road
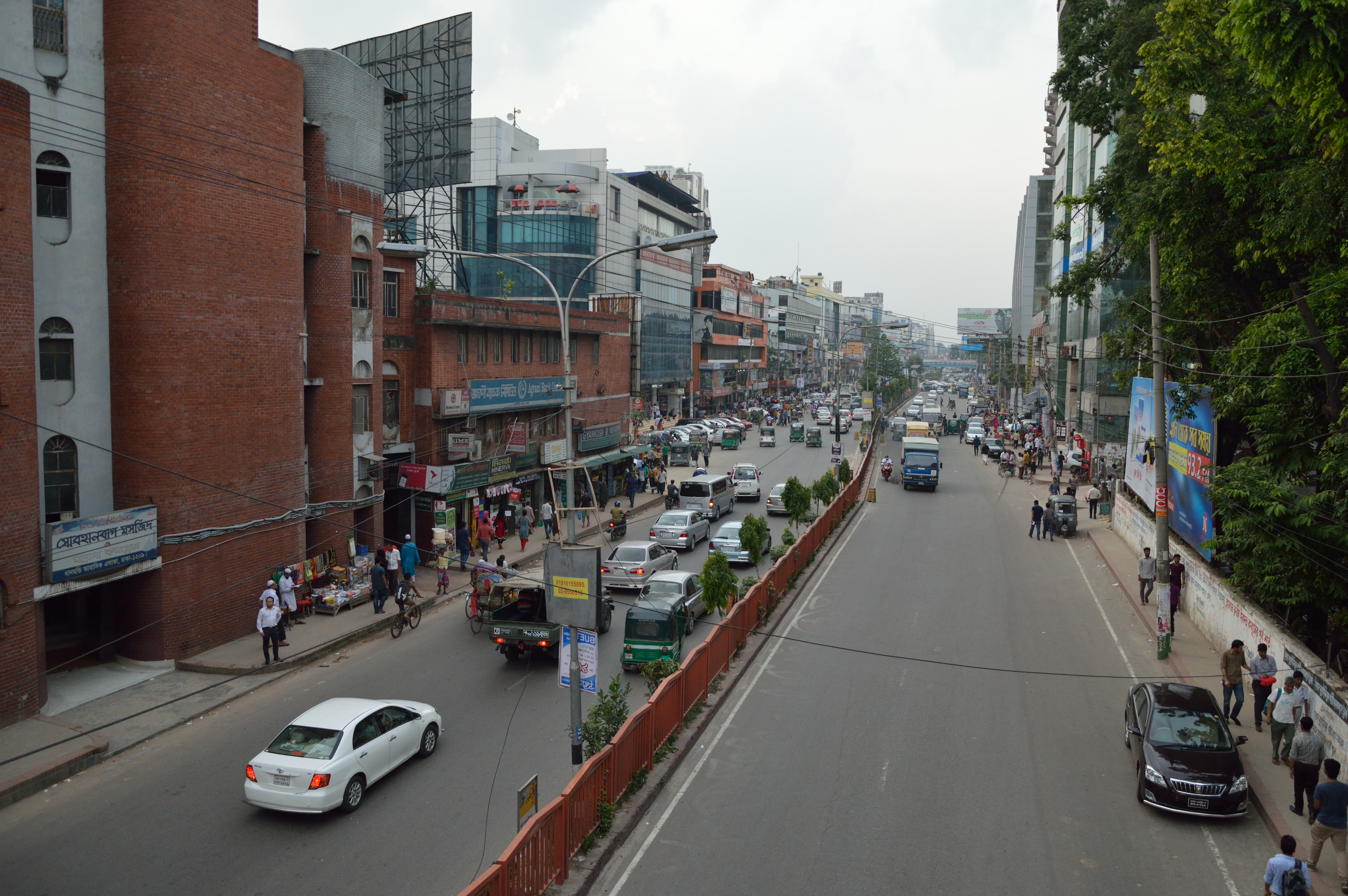

Route information
- Maintained by Bangladesh Road Transport Authority
- Length: 12.5 km (7.8 mi)

Major junctions
- South end: Science Lab, Dhanmondi Thana
- North end: Dhour Beribadh, Turag Thana

Location
- Country: Bangladesh
- Major cities: Dhaka

Highway system
- Roads in Bangladesh
→ N302

Mirpur Road is a north–south road connecting the northern part of Mirpur and Dhaka University campus in Dhaka, Bangladesh. One of the major roads in the Bangladeshi capital, Mirpur Road runs through Shyamoli, Mohammadpur, and Dhanmondi. The main intersections of Mirpur Road include Asad Avenue-Mirpur road, Darus-salam road-Mirpur road, Elephant road-Mirpur road, Panthapath crossing, Ring road crossing etc. The road is one of the busiest in Dhaka city. Numerous buildings and skyscrapers are situated on this road.

== History ==
As Dhaka expanded northward during the Pakistan period (1947–1971), Mirpur Road emerged as the city's main north–south axis, serving the new areas of Dhanmondi, Mirpur, and Uttara.

Non-motorized transport was banned on Mirpur Road between Gabtoli and Russel Square in December 2002 as part of the Dhaka Urban Transport Project (DUTP) financed by the World Bank. On 17 December 2004, the ban was extended from Russell Square to Azimpur.

== Buildings and architecture ==
Mirpur road is home to numerous buildings, skyscrapers, architectural structures etc. Predominantly buildings include commercial buildings, offices, shopping malls and shopping complexes, educational institutions, restaurants, hospitals and so on.

- Shopping Complexes: There is a good number of shopping centers in Mirpur road including the famous Dhaka New Market. Notable shopping complexes include Plaza A.R, Metro Shopping Mall, Rapa Plaza, Family World, Sunrize Plaza, Aarong and so on.
- Educational Institutions: Educational institutions which are beside on Mirpur road include Dhaka Residential Model College, Dhanmondi Government Boys' High School, Daffodil International University, Dhaka City College, New Model Degree College, Monipur High School etc.
- Hospitals: Shaheed Suhrawardy Medical College is one of the largest governmental hospitals and medical colleges of Dhaka is situated on Mirpur road. Other hospitals include Trauma Center, Care Hospital, Popular Medical Hospital, Lab Aid Cardiac Hospital etc.

Besides, there are a number of governmental and non-government offices situated on this road. Gonobhaban, the official residence of Prime Minister is also situated on Mirpur road. Dhaka New Market, a traditional renowned market of Dhaka, where different sorts of commodities are found at a cheap rate, is situated on the southern part of Mirpur road near Nilkhet.

== Gallery ==
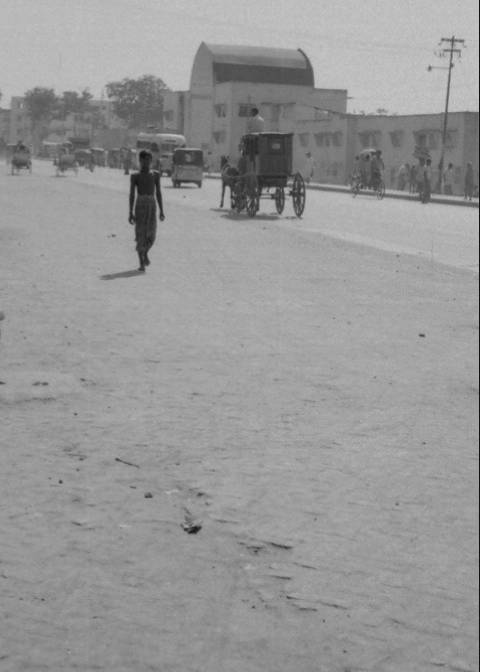
Mirpur Road outside New Market, 1965

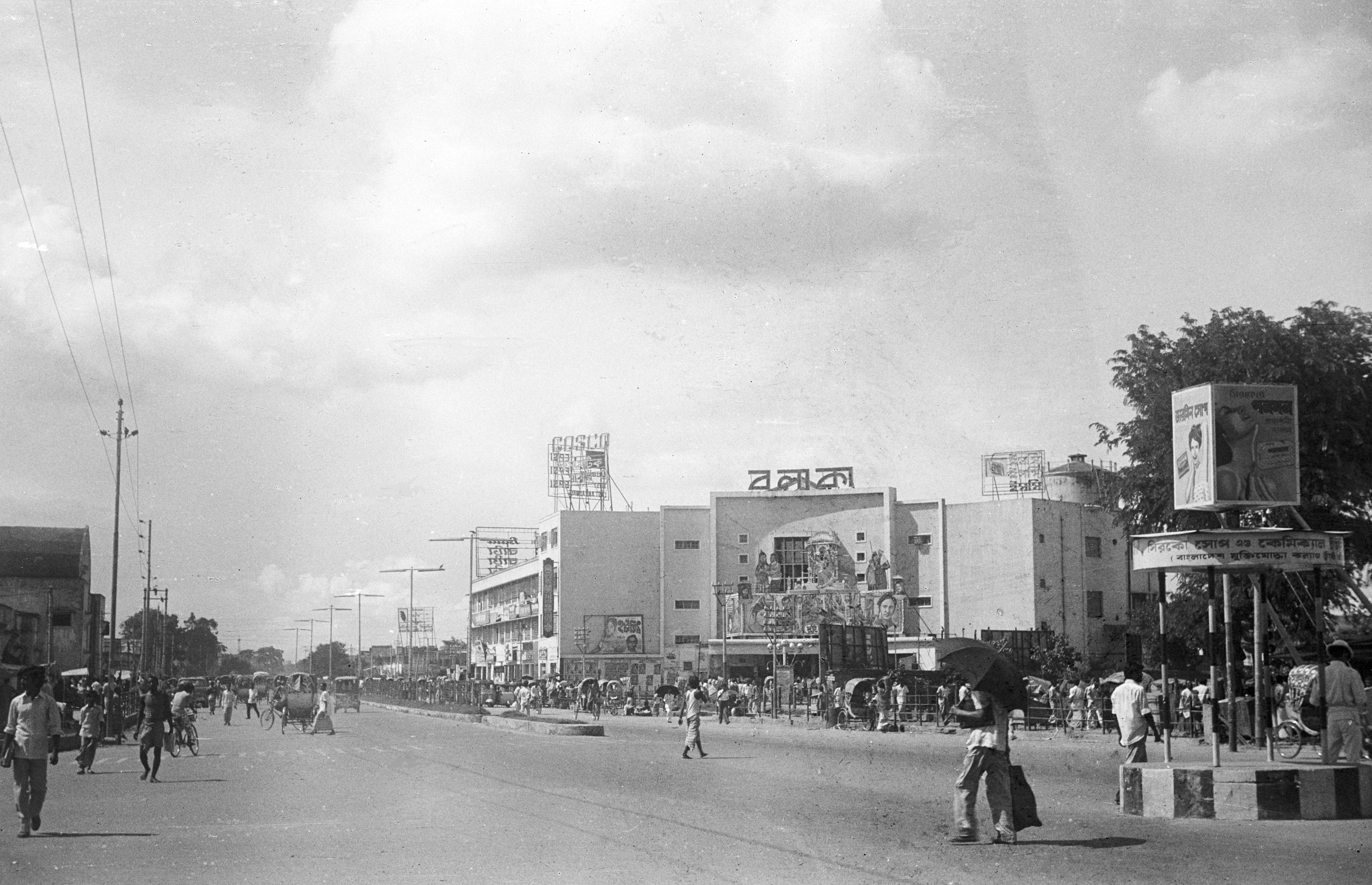
Balaka cinema, Mirpur Road/Nilkhet junction, 1975
