= Shakeel Ahmed =

Shakeel Ahmed may refer to:

- Shakeel Ahmed (cricketer, born 1966), former Pakistani Test cricketer
- Shakeel Ahmed (cricketer, born 1971), former Pakistani Test cricketer
- Shakeel Ahmed (field hockey) (born 1970), Indian field hockey player
- Shakeel Ahmed (Omani cricketer), Omani cricketer
- Shakeel Ahmed (scientist) (born 1989), Indian chemist and educator
- Shakeel Ahmad (Pakistani politician)
- Shakeel Ahmad, Indian politician

== See also ==
- Shakil Ahmed (disambiguation)
