= Sikder Bodiruzzaman =

Ambassador of Bangladesh to Ethiopia
- In office 24 August 2023 – 30 April 2025
- Preceded by: Md. Nazrul Islam
- Succeeded by: Air Vice Marshal Sitwat Nayeem

Personal details
- Education: University of Rajshahi

Sikder Bodiruzzaman is a Bangladeshi diplomat and a former ambassador of Bangladesh to Ethiopia during 2023–2025. He was the director general of Eastern Europe and CIS wing at the Ministry of Foreign Affairs.

== Early life ==
Bodiruzzaman was born in Khulna. He did his bachelor's and master's in English language and literature at the University of Rajshahi.

== Career ==
Bodiruzzaman worked as a lecturer of New Model Degree College, Dhaka. He joined the foreign service from the 17th batch of the Bangladesh Civil Service in 1998. He has served in Bangladeshi embassies in New York City, Hong Kong, Manila, and Riyad.

From 2004 to 2006, Bodiruzzaman was the first secretary of the Bangladesh High commission in New Delhi. He was the consul general of Bangladesh in Dubai.

From 2014 to 2016, he was the Director general of the External Publicity Wing at the Ministry of Foreign Affairs.

Bodiruzzaman served as the director general of the East Europe and CIS Wing at the Ministry of Foreign Affairs from 2019 to 2023. In July 2023, he was appointed ambassador of Bangladesh to Ethiopia replacing Ambassador Md. Nazrul Islam. He announced his goal to increase Bangladeshi investment in Ethiopia. He celebrated the 54th independence of Bangladesh in Ethiopia saying, “In 1971, Father of the Nation Mujibur Rahman declared independence of Bangladesh. Rising from the ashes of the devastating war of liberation, today Bangladesh stands tall in the committee of nations as a responsible member". He oversaw the establishment of direct flights from Ethiopia to Bangladesh.
