= Aeroplane Mosque =

Mosque in Dhaka, Bangladesh

Coordinates: 23°44′07.8″N 90°23′08.0″E

Religion
- Affiliation: Islam
- Branch/tradition: Sunni
- District: Dhaka
- Ownership: Alhaj Mohammad Ibahim; Waqf estate
- Status: Active

Location
- Location: 390, Jahanara Imam Swarani, Dhaka
- Municipality: Dhaka South
- Country: Bangladesh
- Interactive map of Aeroplane Mosque

Architecture
- Founder: Mohammad Ismail
- Funded by: Mohammad Ismail
- Established: 1960
- Groundbreaking: 1960
- Interior area: 9 katha

The Aeroplane Mosque (also known as Biman Mosque) is a congregational mosque established in 1960 on Elephant Road in Dhaka, Bangladesh. The building features a large aeroplane placed above the staircase on the roof. Built during the East Pakistan period, the mosque was later expanded after the independence of Bangladesh. The five-story mosque is now managed as waqf property and is one of the well-known mosques in Dhaka metropolis.

== History ==
Mohammad Ismail constructed the Aeroplane Mosque on his own land and with his own money. His grandfather, Mohammad Ibrahim, was the Munshi of the Nawab family of Dhaka. He owned approximately 2,000 bighas of land in the Lalmatia and Nilkhet areas. A portion of the Nilkhet property was used to build the mosque in 1960. Initially, it was a single-story structure. After the independence of Bangladesh, it was expanded to two stories. In 1979, the mosque was declared Waqf property in the name of Mohammad Ibrahim. Subsequently, the mosque was extended to five stories. In 2002, a residential Madrasa started operating in this mosque.

=== Naming ===
In the 1960s, many mosques were named after various objects. The founder had an airplane installed on the mosque's minaret in place of a dome to make it widely recognized. This feature eventually became the mosque's name.

== Description ==
The Aeroplane Mosque is built on 9 kathas of land. It is a five-story religious structure. The residential madrasa is located on the fifth floor. Next to the mosque, there is a spiral staircase which forms a significant part of the building. A replica of an airplane is placed on top of the five-story staircase. The mosque is maintained and managed through the rent of shops owned by it as waqf property and received donations.
