= Sitwat Nayeem =

- সিতওয়াত নাঈম

Ambassador of Bangladesh to Ethiopia
- Incumbent
- Assumed office 4 July 2025
- President: Mohammed Shahabuddin
- Prime Minister: Muhammad Yunus (Chief Adviser of Bangladesh)
- Preceded by: Sikder Bodiruzzaman

Personal details
- Born: Joypurhat
- Spouse: Jobaida Khanam
- Relatives: Shafeenul Islam (brother)

Military service
- Allegiance: Bangladesh
- Branch/service: Bangladesh Air Force
- Rank: Air Vice-Marshal

Air Vice Marshal Sitwat Nayeem is a two star air officer of the Bangladesh Air Force. He has been the ambassador of Bangladesh to Ethiopia since July 2025.

== Career ==
Sitwat Nayeem graduated from Defence Services Command and Staff College (DSCSC) and earned a master's in military studies from National University, Bangladesh. He got his second staff course from Air Force Command College (AFCC), Beijing, China, and air war college course from Maxwell Air Force Base, Alabama, United States, and a master's in strategic studies. He is then graduated from National Defence College, Dhaka and achieved masters on social science in security and development from Bangladesh University of Professionals.

On 29 December 1991, Nayeem was commissioned in the Bangladesh Air Force in the General Duties (Pilot) branch.

Nayeem served two years in MONUSCO, the United Nations Organization Stabilization Mission in the Democratic Republic of the Congo. He served as chief waste management officer of Dhaka South City Corporation.

Nayeem served as the director of the Cyber Warfare and Information Technology Directorate at Air Headquarters in Dhaka until 2025.

== Personal life ==
Nayeem is married to Jobaida Khanam and has two sons. Nayeem's father, Colonel Md Nurul Islam, an Army Medical Corps officer, served in the Bangladesh Army for 33 years before retiring in 1994. His brother, Mohammad Shafeenul Islam, is a retired major general in the Bangladesh Army and former Director General of Border Guard Bangladesh. His sister is Shahneela Islam.
