= R. A. M. Golam Muktadir =

Bangladeshi Army officer (died 2020)

Golam Muktadir

5th Director General of Bangladesh Rifles
- In office 17 July 1982 – 16 July 1985
- President: A. F. M. Ahsanuddin Chowdhury; Hussain Muhammad Ershad
- Prime Minister: Ataur Rahman Khan
- Preceded by: Muhammad Atiqur Rahman
- Succeeded by: Sofi Ahmed Chowdhury

Military service
- Allegiance: Bangladesh; Pakistan (before 1971)
- Branch/service: Pakistan Army; Bangladesh Army; Bangladesh Rifles
- Years of service: 1959–1988
- Rank: Major General
- Unit: Regiment of Artillery
- Commands: GOC of 55th Infantry Division; Director General of Bangladesh Rifles; GOC of 11th Infantry Division; Commander of 9th Artillery Brigade
- Battles/wars: Bangladesh Liberation War; Chittagong Hill Tracts Conflict

Ruhul Amin Mohammad Golam Muktadir (died 27 November 2020) was a two-star rank Bangladesh Army officer and former director general of the Bangladesh Rifles.

== Career ==
During the dictatorship of General Hussain Muhammad Ershad, he was the chief martial law administrator of the Jessore region. One broadcaster of state-owned BTV was fired from his job for pronouncing his name wrong by military censure. He commanded the 11th Infantry Division.

Muktadier was the director general of the Bangladesh Rifles from 1 July 1982 to 16 July 1985. He met his counterpart, M. C. Misra of the Border Security Force, at a conference on the Bangladesh-India border.
