= Mohammad Shafeenul Islam =

Bangladeshi military personnel

Shafeenul Islam
- শাফিনুল ইসলাম

22nd Director General of Border Guard Bangladesh
- In office 20 March 2018 – 28 February 2022
- President: Abdul Hamid
- Prime Minister: Sheikh Hasina
- Preceded by: Abul Hossain
- Succeeded by: Shakil Ahmed

Personal details
- Born: 2 March 1966 (age 60) Joypurhat, East Pakistan, Pakistan
- Education: King Abdulaziz University Military Training Bangladesh Military Academy

Military service
- Allegiance: Bangladesh
- Branch/service: Bangladesh Army; Border Guard Bangladesh
- Years of service: 1986–2022
- Rank: Major General
- Unit: East Bengal Regiment
- Commands: Director General of Border Guard Bangladesh; Chairman of Bangladesh Tea Board; Commander of 71st Mechanized Brigade; Commander of 222nd Infantry Brigade; Commander of 403rd Battle Group; Sector Commander of Border Guard Bangladesh
- Battles/wars: UNAMI

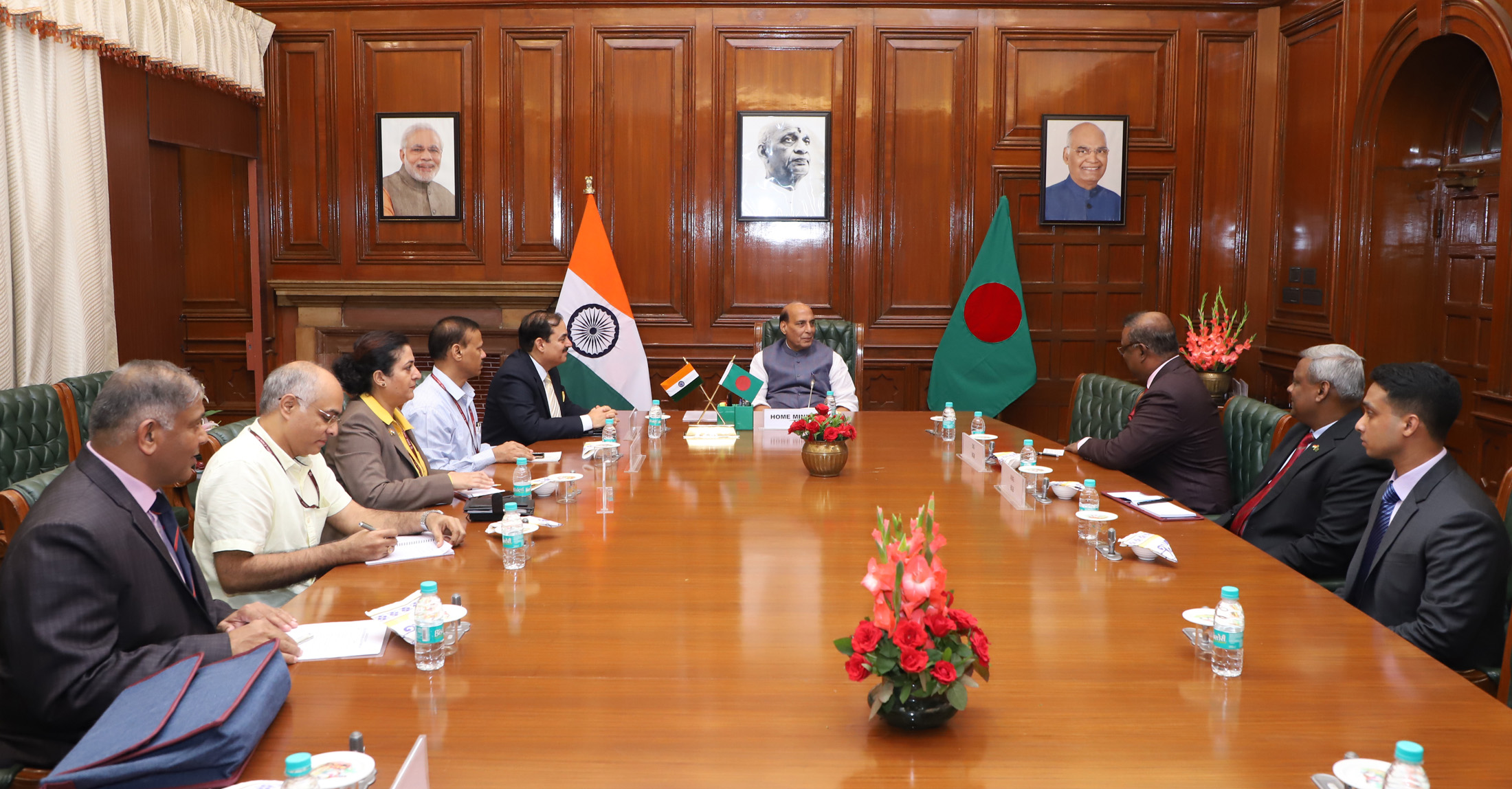
A delegation led by the DG, Border Guards, Bangladesh, Maj. Gen. Shafeenul Islam meeting the Union Home Minister, Shri Rajnath Singh, in New Delhi on September 06, 2018.

Mohammad Shafeenul Islam (Note: BGBM (Bar), ndc, psc) is a former major general in the Bangladesh Army and former director general of Border Guard Bangladesh.

== Early life and education ==
Shafeenul Islam was born on 2 March 1966 in Tilakpur, Joypurhat District. He joined the Bangladesh Military Academy on 25 June 1984. He was commissioned with the 14th BMA Long Course on 27 June 1986 in the Corps of Infantry of the Bangladesh Army. He is a graduate of the Defence Services Command and Staff College and the National Defence College, Bangladesh. He obtained two master's degrees in defence studies, one from National University, Bangladesh, and the other from King Abdul Aziz University, Saudi Arabia.

== Military career ==
Shafeen has commanded several units or formations, including an infantry battalion, a battle-group, and two infantry brigades. As a staff officer, he served as the brigade major of an infantry brigade, and then served as an instructor at the School of Infantry & Tactics and at the Defence Services Command and Staff College in Mirpur. He has also served in the DGFI as director CIB, AFD as DG Intelligence.

His operational service includes a deployment in support of the United Nations Assistance Mission for Iraq as an observer.

He was appointed to the Bangladesh Tea Board on 14 February 2016 as its chairman, where he promoted the diversification of tea products, including introducing pickles made from tea to the Bangladesh Tea Expo. He was appointed as the director general of Border Guards Bangladesh (BGB) in March 2018, replacing Major General Abul Hossain. On 18 February 2022, Major General Shakil Ahmed became the director general of BGB by replacing him, and General Shafeen was brought back to the armed forces from deputation. As the DG BGB, Shafeen reduced border violence. Within a short period as DG, he visited almost all the remote bordering areas and border outposts, where he talked with deployed BGB members and inquired about their well-being. Shafeen has also assisted the government to handle Rohingya issues along the border.

Shafeenul Islam was praised by the prime minister of Bangladesh, Sheikh Hasina, for his efforts to diversify tea products, including using tea to make pickles and cosmetic products.

== Family life ==
Shafeenul is married to Shoma Islam. The couple has a daughter and a son. Shafeen's father, Colonel Md Nurul Islam, an Army Medical Corps officer, also served in the Bangladesh Army for 33 years before retiring in 1994. His only brother, Air Vice Marshal Sitwat Nayeem, is an air officer in the Bangladesh Air Force, and his sister, Shahneela Islam, is self employed.
