= Chitta Ranjan Dutta =

Bangladeshi army general (1929–2020)

Chitta Ranjan Dutta BU
- চিত্তরঞ্জন দত্ত

1st Director General of Bangladesh Rifles
- In office 31 July 1972 – 21 February 1974
- President: Abu Sayeed Chowdhury; Mohammad Mohammadullah
- Prime Minister: Sheikh Mujibur Rahman
- Succeeded by: Mohammad Khalilur Rahman

Personal details
- Born: 1 January 1929 Shillong, Assam, British India
- Died: 26 August 2020 (aged 91) Boca Raton, Florida, U.S.
- Awards: Bir Uttom

Military service
- Allegiance: Bangladesh; Pakistan (before 1971)
- Branch/service: Pakistan Army; Bangladesh Army; Bangladesh Rifles
- Years of service: 1952–1984
- Rank: Major General
- Unit: Wilde's Rifles(PIF); East Bengal Regiment
- Commands: Director General of BGB; Chief of Logistics, Army Headquarters; Commander of 72nd Independent Infantry Brigade; Commander of Sector – IV
- Battles/wars: Indo-Pakistani War of 1965; Bangladesh Liberation War; Chittagong Hill Tracts Conflict

Chitta Ranjan Dutta BU (1 January 1929 – 26 August 2020), also known as C R Dutta, was a Bangladeshi military officer and war hero who served as a two star officer of the Bangladesh Army. He was a key sector commander of the Mukti Bahini during the Bangladesh Liberation War. After independence, Dutta was the inaugural commander of the 72nd Independent Brigade, and in 1972, he was made pioneer director-general of the Bangladesh Rifles (now known as Border Guards Bangladesh).

Dutta was a prominent minority rights advocate in Bangladesh. He was also the president of the Bangladesh Hindu Buddhist Christian Unity Council.

== Early life ==
Dutta was born on 1 January 1929 to Upendra Chandra Dutta and Labanyaprabha Dutta. The ancestral village of Dutta of Mirashi was in erstwhile Sylhet district, presently in Chunarughat Upazila of Habiganj District in Sylhet Division of Bangladesh. His father was a police officer posted in Shillong, the then capital of Assam in British India, and so he was born in Shillong. He started his schooling in Laban Government High School in Shillong, but moved to Habiganj after second grade. In 1944, he appeared for Entrance from Habiganj Government High School. Later he took admission at Asutosh College of the University of Calcutta in science. However, he left Asutosh College and completed his B.Sc. from Daulatpur College in Khulna.

== Military career ==
In 1950, after completing his graduation, Dutta joined the Pakistan Military Academy, Kakul. He was commissioned in 1952 as a second lieutenant in a Piffer unit with a majority of Pathan jawans. After completing his YO Course from Quetta Staff College, he was posted in Hyderabad, Sindh, as a platoon leader and later as company 2 i/c. He was one of the few Hindu officers in the 1950s in the Pakistan Army.

There were only a handful of other Hindu officers in the Pakistan Army: one M.N. Chakraborty of the Baloch Regiment who resigned as a captain in 1950 and transferred to India; one G.C. Bose of the Signals Regiment and 1 East Bengal Regiment who retired as a major in 1959; and an M.N. Saha of 26th Jacob's Mountain Battery who retired as a major of the EPR in 1962. During the 1950s and 1960s, he commanded a rifles platoon, served as adjutant of a rifle company (1954–57), GSO-3 (training) of an infantry battalion (1958–1960), and commanded an infantry company as a major (1962–1964). For a time he was the brigade major in a Frontier Corps brigade based in Peshawar and then the commander of an East Pakistan Rifles wing (1964–66).

During the 1965 Indo-Pakistan War, then Major Dutta served as a battalion commander in the East Pakistan Rifles. Between 1968 and 1970, he was adjutant of the Gilgit Scouts in Skardu. In 1970, Major Dutta was serving in the Quartermaster Branch of the 12th Infantry Division at Quetta. Later he was transferred to the 6th Frontier Force Regiment. In January 1971, he had taken a three-month leave and was staying at his Habiganj residence.

After Mujibur Rahman's 7 March speech, Dutta mentally prepared himself for a possible war. However, as the Pakistani occupation army launched Operation Searchlight, Dutta wasn't initially aware of the widespread repression and torture. At that time he attended a meeting of the political leaders at the house of his neighbour Colonel Abdur Rab. Following the meeting, Dutta decided to fight for the independence of Bangladesh. During the Bangladesh Liberation War, Dutta became the sector commander of Sector 4, which covered the whole of the present Sylhet Division and some adjoining areas. In August 1971, he was promoted to the rank of lieutenant colonel.

After the war, in 1972, Dutta was appointed as brigade commander in Rangpur. In 1972, the Bangladesh Rifles was formed, and he became the first director general of the Bangladesh Rifles. In late 1973, he ordered BDR to attack holdouts of Chakma separatists who had collaborated with the Pakistan Army and ordered expulsion of civilians and burning of huts in the Chittagong Hill Tracts. He later regretted this decision.

He served as the chief of logistics at army headquarters from 1974 to 1976. In 1977, he was appointed as the chairman of Muktijodha Welfare Trust. He was appointed as the chairman of BRTC in 1979. In 1982, he was again appointed as the chairman of Muktijodha Welfare Trust. In January 1984, he was sent to retirement without any L.P.R.

== Rights advocacy ==
The liberation war of Bangladesh was fought on the principles of Bengali nationalism. The 1972 Constitution of Bangladesh included the principles of democracy, secularism, socialism, and Bengali nationalism as the four pillars of the nation. After the assassination of Sheikh Mujibur Rahman, successive military regimes gradually removed the founding principles by Islamic principles. On 9 June 1988, Islam was declared the state religion of Bangladesh. Major General (Retd.) Chitta Ranjan Dutta, along with minority leaders from other communities, founded the Bangladesh Hindu Buddhist Christian Unity Council.

Since the foundation, Dutta has served as the president of the organization in an uninterrupted manner. As the president, Dutta fought tirelessly for the rights of the minorities. Dutta campaigned for the return of the properties confiscated using the Vested Property Act to their rightful owners. Dutta was also vocal on the removal of Islam as the state religion of Bangladesh and supported the restoration of 1972 Constitution of Bangladesh.
