= Atiqur Rahman =

Former (5th) Army Chief of Bangladesh

- Official portrait

5th Chief of Army Staff
- In office 31 August 1986 – 31 August 1990
- President: Hussain Muhammad Ershad
- Prime Minister: Mizanur Rahman Chowdhury; Moudud Ahmed; Kazi Zafar Ahmed
- Preceded by: Hussain Muhammad Ershad
- Succeeded by: Nuruddin Khan

4th Director General of Bangladesh Rifles
- In office 15 December 1977 – 30 June 1982
- President: Ziaur Rahman; Abdus Sattar; A. F. M. Ahsanuddin Chowdhury
- Prime Minister: Mashiur Rahman (acting); Shah Azizur Rahman
- Preceded by: Quazi Golam Dastgir
- Succeeded by: R. A. M. Golam Muktadir

Deputy Chief of Army Staff
- Incumbent
- Assumed office 28 April 1978
- President: Ziaur Rahman; Abdus Sattar; A F M Ahsanuddin Chowdhury; Hussain Muhammad Ershad
- Prime Minister: Mashiur Rahman (acting); Shah Azizur Rahman; Ataur Rahman Khan; Mizanur Rahman Chowdhury
- Chief of Army Staff: Hussain Muhammad Ershad
- Succeeded by: Office abolished

Personal details
- Born: 1 September 1931 Murshidabad, Bengal, British India
- Died: 20 December 2023 (aged 92) Dhaka, Bangladesh

Military service
- Allegiance: Pakistan (before 1971); Bangladesh
- Branch: Pakistan Army; Bangladesh Army; Bangladesh Rifles
- Service years: 1954 – 1990
- Rank: Lieutenant General; Service number: BA–59
- Unit: Regiment of Artillery
- Commands: Commander of 65th Independent Infantry Brigade; GOC of 24th Infantry Division; Quartermaster General at Army Headquarters; Director General of Bangladesh Rifles; Principal Staff Officer of Supreme Command Headquarters; Adjutant General at Army Headquarters; Chief of Army Staff
- Conflicts: Indo-Pakistani war of 1965; Bangladesh Liberation War (as POW); Chittagong Hill Tracts conflict; 1982 coup d'état

M. Atiqur Rahman (Note: ndc, G+) (1 September 1931 – 20 December 2023) was a three star general and Bangladesh's chief of army staff from 1986 to 1990. He was the longest-serving director general of the Bangladesh Rifles.

== Early life ==
M. Atiqur Rahman was born in Murshidabad. He studied at Union Academy, Delhi, India. His father, Abdur Rahman, was an officer in the Ministry of Defence. After the partition of India, his father was sent to Rawalpindi, where he attended Gordon College, Rawalpindi. He earned his B.Sc. degree from there.

== Military career ==
=== Pakistan Army ===
Atiqur Rahman joined the Pakistan Army on 28 August 1951. He was commissioned from the 9th PMA Long Course on 13 March 1954 in the Pakistan Army's artillery regiment. He was posted to the 20 Heavy Anti Aircraft Artillery Regiment. As a major, he served as the ground testing officer in the Inter Service Selection Board. As a lieutenant colonel, he served as the commanding officer of the 13 LAA Regiment.

=== Bangladesh Army ===
Rahman could not join the Bangladesh Liberation War, as he was held as a prisoner of war (POW) in West Pakistan. He was repatriated from Pakistan in 1974 and was allowed to join the Bangladesh Army. He was the second repatriated officer to become Bangladesh's chief of army staff after Ershad. On 13 November 1973, he was appointed as the director of the Department of Artillery. On 15 May 1974, he was promoted to the rank of colonel. He was appointed as the first colonel commandant of the Regiment of Artillery.

During the assassination of Sheikh Mujibur Rahman, he was a colonel and was posted as director at Army Headquarters. On 23 October 1975, he was appointed as the commander of the 65th Independent Infantry Brigade. On 19 April 1976, he was promoted to the rank of brigadier. On 17 July, he established the 24th Infantry Division. Later, he was appointed as the quartermaster general at Army Headquarters. On 25 August, he was promoted to the rank of major general.

Rahman served as director general of the Bangladesh Rifles (now the Bangladesh Border Guard) from 1977 to 1982. He played a crucial role in Ershad's bloodless coup in 1982. Later on 25 May 1983, he was appointed as the principal staff officer of Supreme Command Headquarters. Rahman returned to army headquarters for serving as the adjutant general of the army in February 1986.

=== As chief of army staff ===
Rahman being the senior-most major general, Ershad promoted M Atiqur to the rank of lieutenant general and appointed him as Chief of Army Staff of the Bangladesh Army on 1 September 1986. As army chief, he was crucial to the introduction of Bangladeshi military personnel into the UN peacekeeping forces. As the Bangladesh Army was infantry-heavy, he encouraged officers from other corps, such as the Artillery and Signal Corps, to serve in infantry roles in the Chittagong Hill Tracts. He later pointed out that this was crucial to the military's later success in the UN peacekeeping forces.

He also pulled the military away from politics and chose not to intervene during the anti-Ershad protests. This would later be emulated by his successors as well.

Rahman retired from the Bangladesh Army with full military honours in August 1990. He was succeeded by Nuruddin Khan as appointed by President Hussain Muhammad Ershad.

== Personal life ==
In 1961, he was married to Begum Munira Mohabbat. They had two sons and one daughter. Begum Munira died in 2010.

== Awards and decorations ==

	Nirapattya Padak (Nirapattya Padak)		
Joy Padak (Joy Padak)	Songbidhan Padak (Songbidhan Padak)	Jesthata Padak III (Jesthata Padak III)	Jesthata Padak II (Jesthata Padak II)
Jesthata Padak I (Jesthata Padak I)	Sitara-e-Harb 1965 War (War Star 1965)	Tamgha-e-Jang 1965 War (War Medal 1965)	Tamgha-e-Jamhuria (Republic Commemoration Medal) 1956

== Later life and death ==
After retirement, Atiqur Rahman stayed away from the public eye and did not pursue a political career.

Atiqur Rahman died from a heart attack in Dhaka, on 20 December 2023, at the age of 92.
