= Mohammad Abu Ishaque Ibrahim =

Retired Major General of Bangladesh Army

Abu Ishaque Ibrahim
- আবু ইসহাক ইব্রাহিম

13th Director General of Bangladesh Rifles
- In office 12 July 2001 – 1 December 2001
- President: Shahabuddin Ahmed; A. Q. M. Badruddoza Chowdhury
- Prime Minister: Sheikh Hasina; Latifur Rahman (acting); Khaleda Zia
- Preceded by: A. L. M. Fazlur Rahman
- Succeeded by: Rezaqul Haider

Military service
- Allegiance: Pakistan (Before 1972); Bangladesh
- Branch/service: Pakistan Army; Bangladesh Army; Bangladesh Rifles
- Years of service: 1969–2001
- Rank: Major General
- Unit: Regiment of Artillery
- Commands: GOC of 11th Infantry Division; Director General of Bangladesh Rifles; Director General of BNCC; Commander of 33rd Artillery Brigade

Mohammad Abu Ishaque Ibrahim is a retired major general of the Bangladesh Army. He served as the director general of the Bangladesh Rifles from 12 July 2001 to 1 December 2001.

== Career ==
Abu Ishaque Ibrahim was the battalion commander of the cadet battalion and commander of the Bogra division. He was later promoted to the rank of major general through periodic promotions. He served as the director general of the Bangladesh Rifles from 12 July 2001 to 1 December 2001. He retired on January 21, 2002.

Preceded by Major General A. L. M. Fazlur Rahman	Chief of Bangladesh Rifles; 12 July 2001 - 1 December 2001	Succeeded by Major General Rezaqul Haider
