= Dhaka Residential Model College =

- ঢাকা রেসিডেনসিয়াল মডেল কলেজ

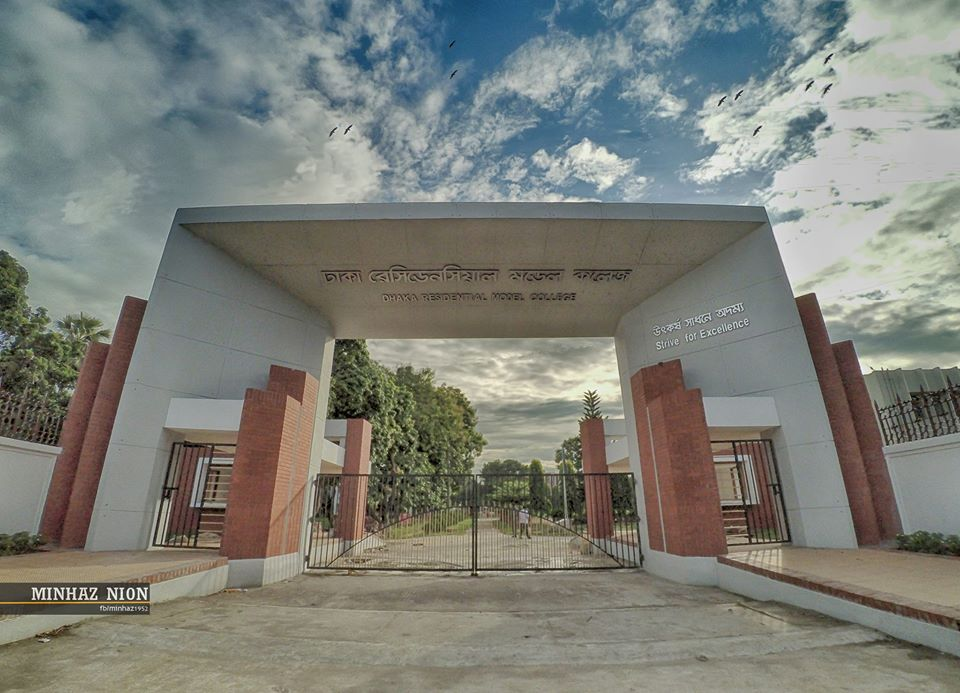
- Main gate of the college

Location
- Mirpur Road; Mohammadpur, Dhaka, 1207; Bangladesh; 23°45′54″N 90°22′4″E

Information
- Former name: Residential Model School
- Type: Public autonomous
- Motto: উৎকর্ষ সাধনে অদম্য (Strive for Excellence)
- Established: May 5, 1960; 66 years ago
- Founder: Field Marshal Ayub Khan
- School district: Dhaka Education Board
- School number: 108258
- School code: 1300
- Principal: Fatema Zohora
- Faculty: Full time-170, part time-31
- Grades: 3-12
- Gender: Boys
- Age range: 8–18 (approximately)
- Enrollment: 5550 (2022-2023)
- Language: Bengali, English
- Campus size: 52 acres (21 ha)
- Campus type: Urban
- Color: White
- Sports: Football, cricket, basketball, volleyball, table tennis, hockey, badminton
- Team name: DRMC Team
- Publication: সন্দীপন
- Demonym: Remians
- Alumni Organization: Old Remians Welfare Association (ORWA)
- ORWA's Website: www.remians.com.bd
- Website: www.drmc.edu.bd

Dhaka Residential Model College (DRMC; Bengali: ঢাকা রেসিডেনসিয়াল মডেল কলেজ) is a public autonomous residential school on Mirpur Road, Mohammadpur, Dhaka, Bangladesh. The college offers primary, secondary education and higher secondary education, for students from third grade to twelfth grade. This institution is the largest public boarding school and college in the country, with 52 acres of land, modeled after Eton College which has been referred to as "the nurse of England's statesmen".

== History ==
Dhaka Residential Model College was established by the then President of Pakistan Field Marshal Muhammad Ayub Khan in 1960 on an area of about 52 acres beside Mirpur Road near Sher-e-Bangla Nagar in Dhaka.

In 1962, the administration of DRMC was assumed by the provincial government of then East Pakistan.

In 1965, the government converted the institution into an autonomous body, and its administration was relegated to a board of governors with the Chief Secretary as its chairman. In 1967, the government again took control of the school. At that time, a new board of governors was constituted with the Education Secretary as its chairman. The school opened its eleventh and twelfth grades in 1967.

The initial purpose of establishing DRMC was to provide education for the sons of elite military officers and high-ranking government officials in East Pakistan. The school, and later the college, were modeled after public schools in the United Kingdom (according to the Public Schools Act 1868), particularly Eton College.

The house system was designed to resemble Eton's. After the independence of Bangladesh, a board of governors was appointed with the Education Secretary as its chairman. Since its inception, the school has been funded through government grants and minimal student fees. The Board of Governors has been empowered to “frame rules as it deems necessary for the proper functioning of the school.The college also was the first to establish the Bangladesh National Cadet Corps.”

The school initially operated with a single study session, known as the Morning Shift. In March 1993, an additional session, the Day Shift, was introduced in accordance with the government’s education expansion policy to accommodate the increasing number of students. The Morning Shift operates from 7:30 a.m. to 12:10 p.m., while the Day Shift runs from 12:30 p.m. to 5:10 p.m.

== College clubs ==
The college has a variety of clubs and organizations that students can join to pursue their interests and participate in extracurricular activities.

#	Club Name
1	DRMC Adventure & Tour Club
2	DRMC Games and Sports Club
3	DRMC MUN Association
4	Remians Art Club
5	DRMC Islamic Cultural Club
6	Remians Cultural Club
7	DRMC Social Service Club
8	DRMC Science Club
9	DRMC IT Club
10	Remians Nature & Earth Club
11	DRMC Youth Club
12	DRMC Business and Career Club
13	Remians Language Club
14	DRMC Film and Photography Club
15	DRMC Math Club
16	Remians Red Crescent Youth
17	Remians Debating Society
18	DRMC Scouts
19	DRMC BNCC Platoon
20	DRMC Band Team

== Extracurricular activities ==
=== Sports ===
The DRMC cricket team achieved 6th consecutive champion title in Dhaka Metropolis and 3 times champion in Dhaka Division Organized By Education Ministry from 2019 to 2024. Besides, the DRMC football team reached the finals and became runner-up in the first-ever Inter-School Football Tournament 2003; moreover one of its players won the Man of the Match trophy.

The team won the championship in the Inter-School Football Competition for the first time in 2006. The college was also the first to establish the Bangladesh National Cadet Corps. DRMC also hosts many tournaments on its grounds.

=== Quiz Bowl ===
Quiz team of Dhaka Residential Model College at ATN Bangla in 2026

DRMC students actively take part in various quiz bowls. The DRMC quiz team became champions in a competition organized by Bangladesh Television in 2001. Among 50 competing schools, the DRMC team won first place by defeating Viqarunnisa Noon School. DRMC students won championships in the quiz contest at Notre Dame College Science Festival 2002, Standard Chartered-Prothom Alo 14th Inter College Quiz Contest hosted by the National Defence College, India, 28th National Science & IT Week 2005, Inter-School Quiz Contest 2006 hosted by Shishu Academy and BCSIR Science Fair, the national level science fair hosted annually by the Bangladesh Council of Scientific and Industrial Research.

DRMC quiz team 'Platinum' became champion in The HSBC Prothom Alo Language Competition in 2005 both at the regional and national levels. DRMC quiz team 'BOMARU' secured the championship in the National Inter-School Quiz Competition organized by Bangladesh Shishu Academy in 2009. The team also won the 2017 'Quiz Quiz', an interschool competition organized by Bangladesh Television.

Quiz team of Dhaka Residential Model College at Biggan Biggani on Bangladesh Television in 2025

In September 2025, DRMC's quiz team, DRMC Sparks, won the 1st Collegiate Quiz Cup by defeating top teams from Notre Dame College, Holy Cross College, St. Joseph Higher Secondary School, Dhaka College, and Birshreshtha Noor Mohammad Public College.

=== Publications ===
Shandipan is the yearbook of Dhaka Residential Model College, containing school-related news and writing by the students, teachers, and staff. In addition, the college publishes supplements and souvenirs on the occasion of special functions and events, such as the Science Club publishing a souvenir named Aurora, the Language Club publishing Dhoni and the Islamic Culture Club publishing Deen.

== Notable alumni ==
- Tarique Rahman, Prime Minister of Bangladesh and chairman of the Bangladesh Nationalist Party (BNP)
- Faruque Ahmed, former president of the Bangladesh Cricket Board
- Kabir Bin Anwar, cabinet secretary of Bangladesh (2022–2023)
- Leepu Nizamuddin Awlia, automotive engineer, designer, and coachbuilder
- Shamsher M. Chowdhury, former foreign secretary of Bangladesh
- Sheikh Jamal, son of Sheikh Mujibur Rahman
- Mohamed Mijarul Quayes, former foreign secretary of Bangladesh
- Khalilur Rahman, Minister of Foreign Affairs and President of the United Nations General Assembly for its 81st session
- Nafees Bin Zafar, the first person of Bangladeshi origin to win an Academy Award (Academy Scientific and Technical Award in 2008 and 2015)
- Arafat Rahman, Bangladeshi cricket organiser and former chairman of the Development Committee of the Bangladesh Cricket Board.
- Farhan Faiyaz, martyr of July Revolution
