= Shakil Ahmed (general, born 1968) =

Bangladesh Army officer (born 1968)

Shakil Ahmed SPP, BSP
- সাকিল আহমেদ
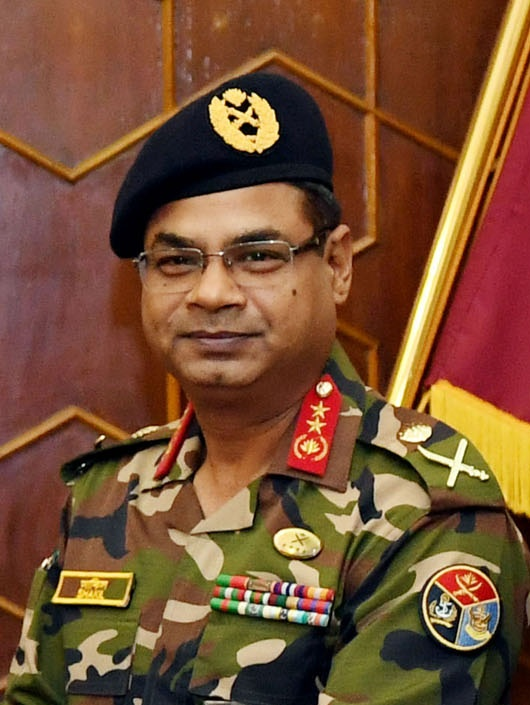

23rd Director General of Border Guard Bangladesh
- In office 02 March 2022 – 17 January 2023
- President: Abdul Hamid
- Prime Minister: Sheikh Hasina
- Preceded by: Shafeenul Islam
- Succeeded by: Nazmul Hasan

Personal details
- Born: 19 December 1968 (age 57) Joypurhat, East Pakistan, Pakistan
- Education: Military Training Bangladesh Military Academy
- Awards: Sena Parodorshita Padak (SPP); Bishishto Seba Padak (BSP)

Military service
- Allegiance: Bangladesh
- Branch/service: Bangladesh Army; Border Guard Bangladesh
- Years of service: 1988–2024
- Rank: Major General
- Unit: Bangladesh Infantry Regiment
- Commands: Senior Directing Staff (Army-1) of National Defence College; GOC of 66th Infantry Division; Director General of Border Guards Bangladesh; Adjutant General of Army Headquarters; GOC of 19th Infantry Division; Commandant of School of Infantry and Tactics; Director General of Department of Immigration & Passports; Commander of 99th Composite Brigade

Shakil Ahmed (Note: SPP, BSP, BGBM, nswc, afwc, psc) is a retired two-star general of the Bangladesh Army. He served as senior directing staff (army-1) at National Defence College. Prior to that, he was the general officer commanding of the 66th Infantry Division and area commander, Rangpur Area. He served as the director general of Border Guards Bangladesh (BGB). Prior to this appointment, he served as adjutant general of army headquarters. Before thatm he was the general officer commanding of the 19th Infantry Division and area commander of the Ghatail area.

== Education ==
Shakil Ahmed was born on 19 December 1968 in Joypurhat District, East Pakistan, now Bangladesh. He completed his postgraduate education in national security and war studies, and strategic studies and defense studies.

== Career ==
Shakil Ahmed was commissioned in the Infantry Corps of the Bangladesh Army on 19 December 1988.

Shakil Ahmed commanded the 99th Composite Brigade and the 12th East Bengal Regiment. He was the chief instructor and later commandant at the School of Infantry and Tactics.

During Shakil Ahmed's tenure at army headquarters as AG, he signed a significant deal on 'Bangladesh Military Contingent Agreement 2021' with Kuwait Army Assistant Chief of Staff Major General Khaled AHHM Al Qadri. This deal will ensure Bangladesh Military Contingent would assist in Kuwait as part of Operation Rebuilding Kuwait (ORK), which in Bengali is known as Operation Kuwait Punargathan (OKP).

Shakil Ahmed was appointed as the director general of the Department of Immigration & Passports Office in September 2019. He replaced Major General Muhammad Shohail Hossain Khan, who was made chairman of the Bangladesh Tea Board.

On 18 February 2022, Ahmed was appointed as director general of the Border Guards Bangladesh, replacing Major General Shafeenul Islam, who was to retire from the army later that month. Ahmed was the vice-president of the Bangladesh Golf Federation and Kurmitola Golf Club.
