= Md. Nazrul Islam (ambassador to Ethiopia) =

Ambassador of Bangladesh to Russia
- Incumbent
- Assumed office 20 June 2025
- Preceded by: Kamrul Ahsan

Ambassador of Bangladesh to Qatar
- In office February 2023 – July 2025
- Preceded by: Md. Jashim Uddin
- Succeeded by: Mohammad Hazrat Ali Khan

Ambassador of Bangladesh to Ethiopia
- In office 21 March 2021 – 26 January 2023
- Preceded by: Md. Monirul Islam
- Succeeded by: Sikder Bodiruzzaman

Personal details
- Education: University of Dhaka (MS)

Md. Nazrul Islam is a Bangladeshi diplomat and incumbent ambassador of Bangladesh to Russia since June 2025. He previously served as an ambassador to Ethiopia and Qatar.

== Early life ==
Islam completed his master's in international relations from the University of Dhaka.

== Career ==
Islam joined the 15th batch of Bangladesh Civil Service as a foreign affairs cadre.

Islam was the Deputy Permanent Representatives of Bangladesh to the United Nations in Geneva and Vienna.

Islam was the Director General of the Multilateral Economic Affairs Wing in the Ministry of Foreign Affairs in 2020. He was appointed the Ambassador of Bangladesh to Ethiopia in September 2020. He was also the Permanent Representative of Bangladesh to the African Union and Permanent Representative of Bangladesh to the United Nations Economic Commission for Africa. In October 2022, Islam was appointed the ambassador of Bangladesh to Qatar replacing Ambassador Md. Jashim Uddin. Sikder Bodiruzzaman replaced Islam as the Ambassador of Bangladesh to Ethiopia.
