= Mohammad Abdul Latif =

Retired Major General of Bangladesh Army

- মোহাম্মদ আবদুল লতিফ

8th Director General of Bangladesh Rifles
- In office 24 September 1990 – 8 June 1992
- President: Hussain Muhammad Ershad; Shahabuddin Ahmed (acting); Abdur Rahman Biswas
- Prime Minister: Kazi Zafar Ahmed; Khaleda Zia
- Preceded by: Sadiqur Rahman Chowdhury
- Succeeded by: Mohammad Anwar Hossain

Personal details
- Died: 18 September 2013

Military service
- Allegiance: Bangladesh; Pakistan
- Branch/service: Pakistan Army; Bangladesh Army; Bangladesh Rifles
- Years of service: 1960–1992
- Rank: Major General Service number:BA–138
- Unit: Corps of Signals
- Commands: Director General of Bangladesh Rifles; Director General of Directorate General of Forces Intelligence; Commandant of Defence Services Command and Staff College; Commander of 86th Independent Signals Brigade; Commandant of Signals Training Centre & School

Mohammad Abdul Latif (died: 18 September 2013) was a major general of the Bangladesh Army. He served as the director general of the Bangladesh Rifles from 24 September 1990 to 8 June 1992. He previously served at the Directorate General of Forces Intelligence as director general

== Career ==
Mohammad Abdul Latif served as the director general of the Bangladesh Rifles from 24 September 1990 to 8 June 1992. He was the accused in the murder case of Major General Manzur.

Preceded by Major General Sadiqur Rahman Chowdhury	Chief of Bangladesh Rifles; 24 September 1990 - 8 June 1992	Succeeded by Major General Mohammad Anwar Hossain
