= Mohammad Hazrat Ali Khan =

Bangladeshi diplomat

- মোহাম্মদ হযরত আলী খান

Ambassador of Bangladesh to Qatar
- Incumbent
- Assumed office 3 August 2025
- Preceded by: Md. Nazrul Islam

Personal details
- Education: University of Dhaka

Mohammad Hazrat Ali Khan is a Bangladeshi diplomat. He is the incumbent ambassador of Bangladesh to Qatar since August 2025.

== Background ==
Khan earned his bachelor's and master's in international relations from the University of Dhaka. He had training at the South Asia Diplomatic Training Program at the Australian National University in Canberra.

== Career ==
Khan joined Bangladesh Foreign Service in 2003.

Khan served at Bangladesh High Commission in London as Acting High Commissioner and Deputy High Commissioner with Ambassador Rank.
