= A. L. M. Fazlur Rahman =

Retired Bangladesh Army officer

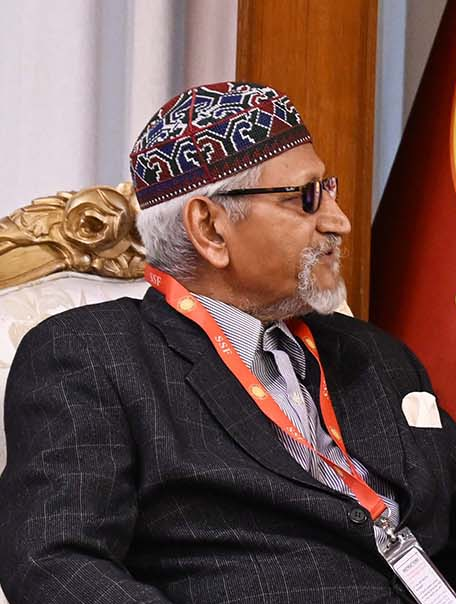
- Rahman in 2025

12th Director General of Bangladesh Rifles
- In office 29 February 2000 – 11 July 2001
- President: Shahabuddin Ahmed
- Prime Minister: Sheikh Hasina
- Preceded by: Mohammad Azizur Rahman
- Succeeded by: Mohammad Abu Ishaque Ibrahim

Personal details
- Education: Turkish Military Academy

Military service
- Allegiance: Bangladesh
- Branch/service: Mukti Bahini; Bangladesh Army; Bangladesh Rifles
- Years of service: 1971–2001
- Rank: Major General
- Unit: East Bengal Regiment
- Commands: Director General of Bangladesh Rifles; GOC of 33rd Infantry Division; Commandant of School of Infantry and Tactics
- Battles/wars: Bangladesh Liberation War; Bosnian War; 2001 Bangladesh-India border clashes

A. L. M. Fazlur Rahman (Note: Bengali: আ ল ম ফজলুর রহমান) (Note: ndu, psc) is a veteran who served as a two star officer of the Bangladesh Army and director general of Bangladesh Rifles. As of May 2025, Rahman has been working as a security analyst for the Government of Bangladesh.

== Education ==
Rahman acquired his temporary commission from Dacca in the 2nd East Bengal Regiment during the Bangladesh War of Independence. His brigade commander, Lieutenant Colonel K. M. Shafiullah, cited him as a fierce and sincere officer under his command at the battle of Shiromoni. After the war, Rahman finished his military training at the Turkish Military Academy till 1973. Rahman is a graduate of the Defence Services Command and Staff College and, furthermore, one of the pioneer batches of international officers at the National Defence University of Malaysia in 1995.

== Military career ==
Rahman commanded one company under the 4th East Bengal Regiment and two infantry battalions at Jessore Cantonment and Cumilla Cantonment, respectively. As colonel, Rahman was sector commander of the Bangladesh Rifles in Rangpur District and colonel administrative at Bogra area headquarters. He was soon promoted to brigadier general in 1993 and was designated as commandant of the School of Infantry and Tactics. He was then promoted to major general in March 1997 and appointed as general officer commanding of the 33rd Infantry Division and area commander Comilla area. Rahman was tenured in Comilla for three years till his recall to the Ministry of Home Affairs in February 2000. Rahman's renowned unforeseeable nature led him to a truncated retirement in September 2001 as ambassador of the Ministry of Foreign Affairs under the first Hasina ministry and then the Latifur Rahman ministry.

In December 2024, he was appointed as the chairman of the National Independent Commission, assigned to reinvestigate the killings in the Bangladesh Rifles revolt of 2009. The commission will be investigating both the domestic and foreign involvement in the incident within a specified three-month time frame.

=== As director general of Bangladesh Rifles ===
Rahman was made the chief of Bangladesh Rifles on 29 February 2000. His short tenure of BDR is noted for being the most progressive jurisdiction with Bangladesh's bordering neighbours. Rahman was in command during the Bangladesh-Myanmar border skirmish in 2000 at Teknaf. These disputes escalated eight years later in the 2008 Bangladesh–Myanmar naval standoff.

In April 2001, a conflict occurred within the bordering regions between India's eastern region and northern Bangladesh. The Bangladesh Rifles claimed that the village of Pyrdiwah had been illegally occupied by India since the Bangladesh Liberation War. The Border Security Force is the primary defence force of Indian borders with Bangladesh and Pakistan. Their post in Padua village was encircled, trapping 31 border security troops. However, the Bangladesh Rifles and the Border Security Force held their fire and began negotiations. Three border security companies proceeded to reinforce the outpost. This incident was resolved later without any bloodshed.

After the Padua incident, a company of 300 border security troops entered Kurigram near the village of Boraibari as a planned counterattack to retaliate after the earlier incident in Padua. After entering Bangladeshi territory, the Border Security Force troops were ambushed by at least 4 battalions of the Bangladesh Rifles, and the Indian counterattack failed as a result. Along with that, the Bangladesh Rifles battalions were assisted by hundreds of villagers. Boraibari clashes ended on 21 April 2001, after both sides agreed to a ceasefire. The clashes left a total of 21 people dead, including 16 Indian soldiers and 3 Bangladeshi Rifles soldiers. Three months later, he left the office of director general preceding Major General Abu Ishaque Ibrahim.

=== United Nations peacekeeping missions ===
Rahman oversaw the operations of the Bangladeshi UN Peacekeeping contingent (BANBAT) from Dhaka which was deployed as part of UNPROFOR during the Siege of Bihać in 1994. He served with the initial forces of the future United Nations Mission in Bosnia and Herzegovina (formed in December that year) until May 1995.

== Interim government role ==
After the fall of Hasina, Rahman was chosen to lead a re-investigation of the BDR Mutiny.

== Personal life ==
Rahman founded the citizens' organization Nirdolio Jono Andolon (lit. 'Non-partisan People's Movement') in April 2004. He has expressed his displeasure towards India's activities in Bangladesh and has spoken out against India's influence in the country.

On 29 April 2025, following the 2025 India–Pakistan standoff, Rahman suggested in a Facebook post that Bangladesh should annex India's seven northeastern states if India invades Pakistan and urged the government to make "a joint military arrangement" with China in this regard. This remark sparked controversy among Indians who perceived this as provocative and drew its connection to the interim government due to the Rahman's association with the government. Later, the Foreign Ministry of Bangladesh clarified this remark as "entirely personal" that "do not reflect the position or policies of the Government of Bangladesh".
