= Abul Hossain =

Bangladeshi military personnel

21st Director General of Border Guard Bangladesh
- In office 2 November 2016 – 8 March 2018
- President: Abdul Hamid
- Prime Minister: Sheikh Hasina
- Preceded by: Aziz Ahmed
- Succeeded by: Shafeenul Islam

Personal details
- Born: 15 March 1962 (age 64) Dacca, East Pakistan, Pakistan
- Education: Bangladesh Military Academy (military training); Bangladesh University of Engineering and Technology; American International University-Bangladesh

Military service
- Allegiance: Bangladesh
- Branch/service: Bangladesh Army; Border Guard Bangladesh
- Years of service: 1981–2018
- Rank: Lieutenant General
- Unit: Corps of Engineers
- Commands: Director General of Border Guard Bangladesh; Military Secretary to President; Commandant of Military Institute of Science and Technology; Engineer in Chief of Army Headquarters; Sector Commander of Border Guard Bangladesh; CO of 33rd Field Company Engineers; CO of 17th Engineer Construction Battalion
- Battles/wars: UNIKOM

Abul Hossain, ndc, psc, is a retired lieutenant general of the Bangladesh Army. He served as the director general of Border Guards Bangladesh (BGB). Before that, he served as military secretary to President Md Abdul Hamid and as engineer-in-chief at Army Headquarters, commandant of the Military Institute of Science and Technology, chief engineer of Dhaka City Corporation, director of the Special Works Organization, and director of works and chief engineer of the Bangladesh Army. He was also ex-officio chairman of Shimanto Bank, which is a sister concern of the Border Guard Bangladesh welfare trust.

== Early life and education ==
Hossain joined the Bangladesh Military Academy on 1 February 1980 and was commissioned on 27 December 1981 in the Corps of Engineers of the Bangladesh Army. He finished his BSc in civil engineering from the Bangladesh University of Engineering and Technology (BUET). He obtained a Master of Business Administration (MBA) from American International University-Bangladesh and a Master in Defence Studies (MDS) from Bangladesh National University. He is qualified in M Phil Part-I from Bangladesh University of Professionals (BUP).

== Career ==
Hossain served in different engineer battalions. He served as officer commanding of 33 Field Company Engineers and project officer of the road construction project at Chimbuk-Thanchi road in Chittagong Hill Tracts. He was brigade major of an independent engineer brigade and grade 2 staff officer of Engineer in Chief Branch at Army headquarters. He was also sector commander of Border Guard Bangladesh. He was chief instructor in the Engineer Centre & School of Military Engineering. He was the director of the Special Works Organization and director works and chief engineer of Army headquarters. He also served as commanding officer of the Engineer Centre and School of Military Engineering Training Battalion and commanding officer of 17 Engineer Construction Battalion. He has done his UN mission as commanding officer of EOD Battalion in Kuwait (OKP-11) in the years 2000–02. He was chief engineer of Dhaka City Corporation and commandant of Bangladesh Ordnance Factory. He was also the commandant of the Military Institute of Science and Technology. He also served as engineer-in-chief at Army headquarters.

Hossain served in the United Nations Iraq–Kuwait Observation Mission. From 2000 to 2002, he commanded the 17 Engineer Construction Battalion and Explosive Ordnance Disposal Battalion in Kuwait (OKP-11).

Hossain joined the Bangabhaban as military secretary to President Md Abdul Hamid in January 2014. He was appointed as director general of the Border Guard Bangladesh on 2 November 2016. On 8 March 2018, he was brought back to the army. and on 14 March he went to retirement. He was elevated to brevet lieutenant general during his leave per retirement (LPR).

After retirement, on 27 November 2018, he and 150 retired army officers joined the Awami League. Hossain sought nomination for the Patuakhali-3 constituency from Awami League ahead of the general election in 2024.
