= Sofi Ahmed Chowdhury =

Former Director General of Bangladesh Rifles

6th Director General of Bangladesh Rifles
- In office 17 July 1985 – 30 June 1988
- President: Hussain Muhammad Ershad
- Prime Minister: Ataur Rahman Khan; Mizanur Rahman Chowdhury; Moudud Ahmed
- Preceded by: R. A. M. Golam Muktadir
- Succeeded by: Sadiqur Rahman Chowdhury

Military service
- Allegiance: Bangladesh; Pakistan (before 1971)
- Branch/service: Pakistan Army; Bangladesh Army; Bangladesh Rifles
- Years of service: 1958–1988
- Rank: Major General
- Unit: Frontier Force Regiment (Before 1971); East Bengal Regiment
- Commands: Director General of Bangladesh Rifles; GOC of 33rd Infantry Division; Commander of 101st Infantry Brigade
- Battles/wars: Bangladesh Liberation War

Sofi Ahmed Chowdhury is a retired two-star rank Bangladesh Army officer and former director general of the Bangladesh Rifles.

== Career ==
Chowdhury was the general officer commanding of the 33 Infantry Division of the Bangladesh Army. He was the martial law administrator of the Comilla region. He served as the director general of the Bangladesh Rifles from 17 July 1985 to 30 June 1988.
