= Ejaz Ahmed Chowdhury =

Bangladeshi Army officer (1945–2022)

- ইজাজ আহমেদ চৌধুরী

10th Director General of Bangladesh Rifles
- In office 12 February 1995 – 18 July 1996
- President: Abdur Rahman Biswas
- Prime Minister: Khaleda Zia; Muhammad Habibur Rahman (acting); Sheikh Hasina
- Preceded by: Mohammad Anwar Hossain
- Succeeded by: Mohammad Azizur Rahman

Personal details
- Born: 1 January 1945 Golapganj, Assam, British India
- Died: 29 September 2022 (aged 77) Sylhet, Bangladesh

Military service
- Allegiance: Bangladesh; Pakistan (Before 1971)
- Branch/service: Pakistan Army; Bangladesh Army; Bangladesh Rifles
- Years of service: 1969–1996
- Rank: Major General
- Unit: East Bengal Regiment
- Commands: GOC of 11th Infantry Division; Director General of Bangladesh Rifles; GOC of 66th Infantry Division; Commander of 72nd Infantry Brigade
- Battles/wars: Bangladesh Liberation War

Ejaz Ahmed Chowdhury (1 January 1945 – 29 September 2022) was a major general of the Bangladesh Army and a freedom fighter of the Liberation War. He served as the director general of the Bangladesh Rifles from 12 February 1995 to 18 July 1996.

== Career ==
Ejaz Ahmed Chowdhury joined the Pakistan Army in 1967. He was commissioned with 40 PMA Long Course in 1969. He was a freedom fighter in 1971 in the 2nd East Bengal Regiment. He was serving in the Second East Bengal Regiment as a captain when the Bangladesh Liberation War started. He served in the branch of military secretary in 1975 as a major. In the same year he was promoted to lieutenant colonel and took over as the assistant military secretary of the Bangladesh Army. He later commanded the 19th East Bengal Regiment from 1977 to 1979. He served as the commander of Bogra Division. He served as the director general of the Bangladesh Rifles from 12 February 1995 to 18 July 1996.

=== Allegations of army mutiny ===
He was sent to compulsory retirement on 25 May 1996 on charges of a failed military coup.

== Personal life ==
Chowdhury was survived by three sons. His brother was Waji Ahmed Chowdhury, who had served as brigadier general. His father was the Islamic scholar Maulana Muhammad Ahmad Choudhury, himself the grandson of the Sufi poet Shah Abdul Wahab Choudhury. Chowdhury was also the maternal nephew of another religious scholar, Abdul Matin Chowdhury.

Preceded by Major General Mohammad Anwar Hossain	Chief of Bangladesh Rifles; 12 February 1995 - 18 July 1996	Succeeded by Major General Mohammad Azizur Rahman
