= Sadiqur Rahman Chowdhury =

Retired Major General of Bangladesh Army

7th Director General of Bangladesh Rifles
- In office 1 July 1988 – 23 September 1990
- President: Hussain Muhammad Ershad
- Prime Minister: Moudud Ahmed; Kazi Zafar Ahmed
- Preceded by: Sofi Ahmed Chowdhury
- Succeeded by: Mohammad Abdul Latif

Personal details
- Born: 9 March 1940
- Died: 3 November 2008 (aged 68) Dhaka, Bangladesh

Military service
- Allegiance: Bangladesh; Pakistan (before 1971)
- Branch/service: Pakistan Army; Bangladesh Army; Bangladesh Rifles
- Years of service: 1961–1994
- Rank: Major General; Service number:BA–140
- Unit: East Bengal Regiment
- Commands: AG of Army Headquarters; GOC of 55th Infantry Division; GOC of 11th Infantry Division; Director General Bangladesh Rifles
- Battles/wars: Bangladesh Liberation War

Sadiqur Rahman Chowdhury was a Bangladesh Army major general and former director general of the Bangladesh Rifles.

== Career ==
In the late 1950s and the early 1960s, Chowdhury played at the Azad Sporting Club and patronized the Sonali Otit Club.

Chowdhury was commissioned on 14 October 1961 in the Pakistan Army as part of the 24th Long Course of the Pakistan Military Academy.

Chowdhury served as the military secretary of the president of Bangladesh from 30 August 1978 to 26 March 1982.

From 30 March 1982 to 11 August 1983, chairperson the Cadet Colleges Governing Body.

Chowdhury served as the chairman of the National Sports Council in 1983. Chowdhury was an advisor of Muktijoddha Sangsad in 1984. In 1985, he was the general officer commanding of the 55th Infantry Division. In 1987, he was the chief coordinator of the government efforts during the 1987 flood in Bangladesh. He was the general officer commanding of the 11th Infantry Division based in Bogra Cantonment. In 1988, he was the zonal martial law administrator (ZMLA) of zone E in the Jessore area. He led a Bangladeshi delegation to Pakistan and met President Muhammad Zia-ul-Haq. From 1 July 1988 to 23 September 1990, Chowdhury served as the director general of Bangladesh Rifles. From 1987 to 1990, he served as the chairman of the National Sports Council.

== Death ==
Chowdhury died on 3 November 2008 at the Combined Military Hospital and was buried in Banani Military Graveyard.

Preceded by Major General Sofi Ahmed Chowdhury	Chief of Bangladesh Rifles; 1 July 1988 – 23 September 1990	Succeeded by Major General Mohammad Abdul Latif
