= Mohammad Azizur Rahman =

Bir Uttom Recipient Retired Major General of Bangladesh Army

Mohammad Azizur Rahman BU
- মোহাম্মদ আজিজুর রহমান

Bangladesh Ambassador to Bahrain
- In office 11 July 2001 – 31 December 2001
- President: Shahabuddin Ahmed; A. Q. M. Badruddoza Chowdhury
- Prime Minister: Sheikh Hasina; Latifur Rahman (acting); Khaleda Zia
- Preceded by: Anwar Ul Alam Shaheed
- Succeeded by: Anwarullah Chowdhury

11th Director General of Bangladesh Rifles
- In office 25 August 1996 – 30 December 1999
- President: Abdur Rahman Biswas; Shahabuddin Ahmed
- Prime Minister: Sheikh Hasina
- Preceded by: Ejaz Ahmed Chowdhury
- Succeeded by: A. L. M. Fazlur Rahman

Personal details
- Born: 1 January 1945 (age 81) Sylhet, Assam, British India
- Spouse: Selina Aziz
- Children: 2
- Education: Jagannath University; Murari Chand College
- Awards: Bir Uttom

Military service
- Allegiance: Bangladesh; Pakistan (Before 1971)
- Branch/service: Pakistan Army; Bangladesh Army; Bangladesh Rifles
- Years of service: 1968–1999
- Rank: Major General
- Unit: East Bengal Regiment
- Commands: Director General Bangladesh Rifles; GOC of 24th Infantry Division; Adjutant General of Army Headquarters; GOC of 66th Infantry Division; Commander of 77th Infantry Brigade; Commander of 203rd Infantry Brigade
- Battles/wars: Bangladesh Liberation War

Mohammad Azizur Rahman (Bengali: মোহাম্মদ আজিজুর রহমান; born 1 January 1945) is a retired major general of the Bangladesh Army and a heroic freedom fighter of the Liberation War. For his bravery in the war of independence, the government of Bangladesh awarded him the title of Bir Uttam.

He served as the Director General of Bangladesh Rifles from 25 August 1996 to 30 December 1999.

== Early life ==
Rahman was born on 1 January 1945 in Beanibazar of Sylhet district. His ancestral home is in Chattis villages of Ranaping in Golapganj. His father's name was Sarafat Ali and his mother's name was Mahibun Nesha. He had to study in Sunamganj, Habiganj and Sylhet as his father's workplace. He graduated from Sylhet MC College with an Intermediate and Jagannath College in Dhaka. His wife's name is Selina Aziz. They have one daughter and one son.

== Career ==
Azizur joined the army in 1966 and trained at the Pakistan Military Academy in Kakul. After commission in April 1968, he joined the 2nd East Bengal Regiment at Lahore. He was later transferred to Joydebpur in Dhaka with the 2nd East Bengal Regiment. He was promoted to the rank of major general through periodic promotions. In 1995, he was the area commander of Chittagong Region and GOC of the 24th Infantry Division. He served as the director general of Bangladesh Rifles from 25 August 1996 to 30 December 1999. He was the chairman of the Hill tracks Development Board and also served as the Ambassador of Bangladesh to Bahrain.

=== Role in the war of liberation ===
On 9 April 1971, he was awarded the title of 'Bir Uttam' for his unparalleled bravery in the battle of Keenbridge over the Surma River in Sylhet.

== Awards and honors ==
- Bir Uttam

Preceded by Major General Ejaz Ahmed Chowdhury	Chief of Bangladesh Rifles; 25 August 1996 - 30 December 1999	Succeeded by Major General A. L. M. Fazlur Rahman
