= Nilkhet =

Area in Dhaka, Bangladesh

Coordinates: 23°44′N 90°23′E

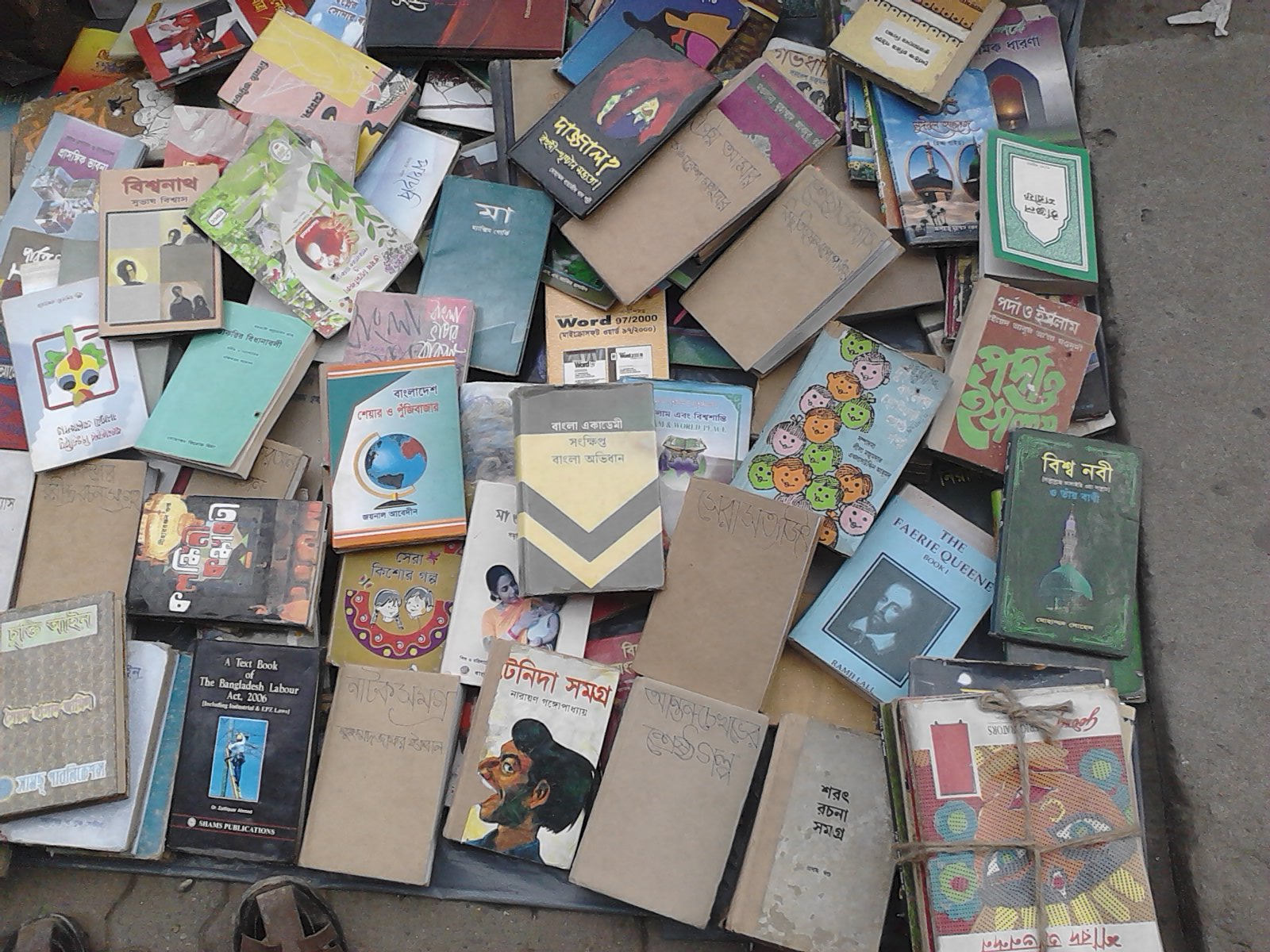
Street shop of second hand books at Nilkhet

Nilkhet (Bengali: নীলক্ষেত) is a neighbourhood in Dhaka, the capital city of Bangladesh. It is located between Dhaka University to the east, Mirpur Road and New Market to the west, and Elephant Road to the north. The name Nilkhet (nil: blue or indigo, khet: field) implies that the area may have been used for indigo cultivation in earlier times.

However, Nilkhet has a completely different identity today. The market has long been the center of the second-hand book trade in Dhaka. It contains several dozen shops that deal in used books and magazines, especially English-language material published in the West. The Nilkhet is regularly patronized by the city's English-language readers, who go there in search of foreign books, journals and comics that are either unavailable elsewhere or only available new at a prohibitive price. Thousands of people regularly visit Nilkhet book stores to find out their daily necessary books.

Because of its proximity to Dhaka University, Dhaka Medical College and BUET, as well as several major colleges such as Dhaka College, Eden College, Dhaka City College and the College of Home Economics, the Nilkhet market has also become a major source of academic material for every student of Bangladesh as it is the biggest book market in Bangladesh. Textbooks of all levels (from primary to tertiary) and for all disciplines may be purchased at Nilkhet. It also has many shops that provide auxiliary services for students, such as photocopying, word-processing, and book-binding. "Photocopying at Nilkhet" is a common rite of passage for nearly all students of nearby universities during their undergraduate and postgraduate years.
