= New Elephant road =

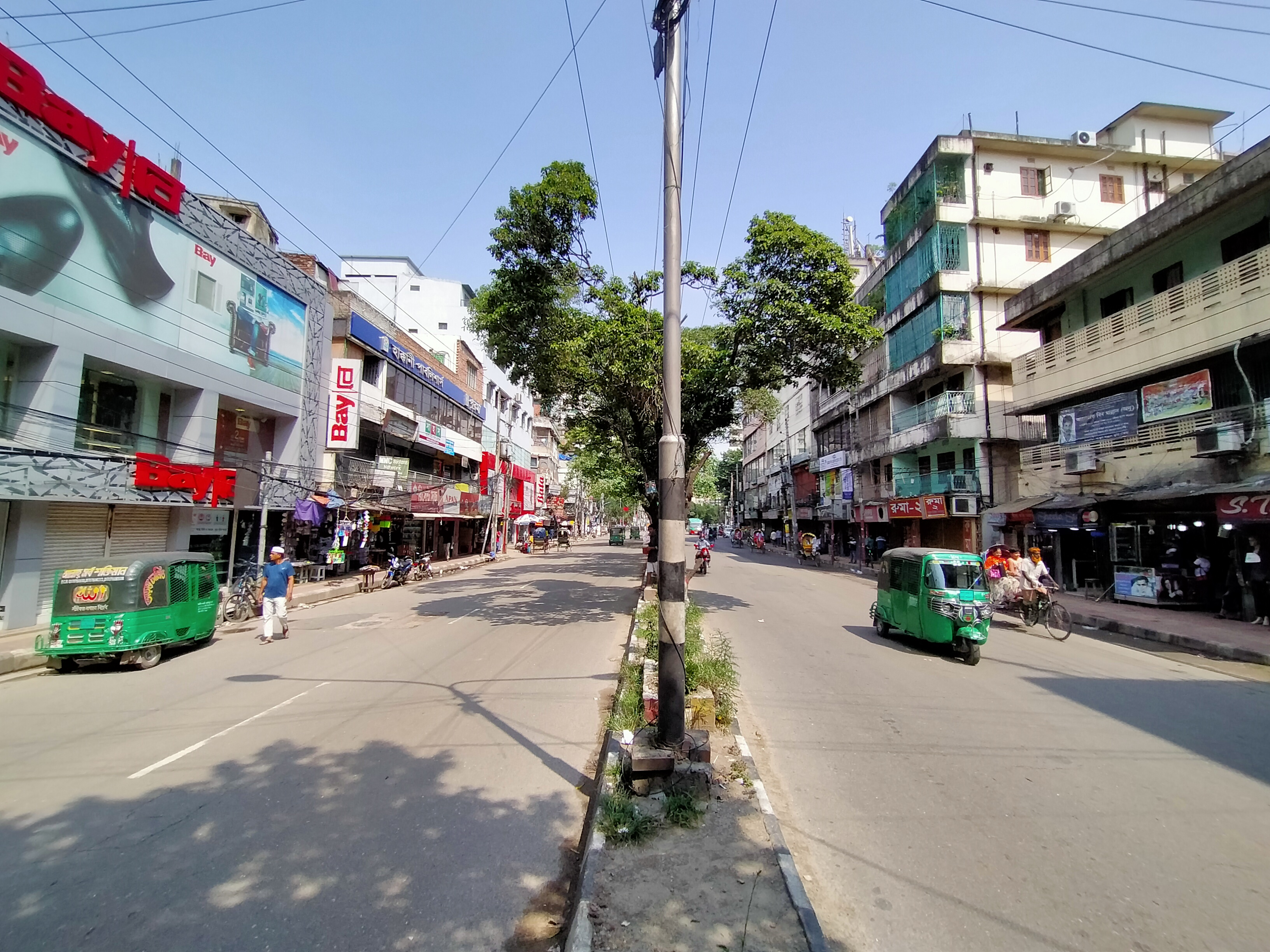
New Elephant Road, Dhaka

Interactive Map Of New Elephant Road

New Elephant Road is a business hub of Dhaka city. It is especially well known for its shops selling carpets, floor coverings, computers, computer hardware, electronics, shoes, ceramics, garments, decorative items, watches, and food. It was previously known as Laboratory Road. It connects Science Laboratory and Shahbagh. The road also connects to the Nilkhet area, which is well-known for its numerous bookshops offering a wide array of books at affordable prices. It is close to both Dhaka University and Dhaka College.
