= Bangladesh Tea Board =

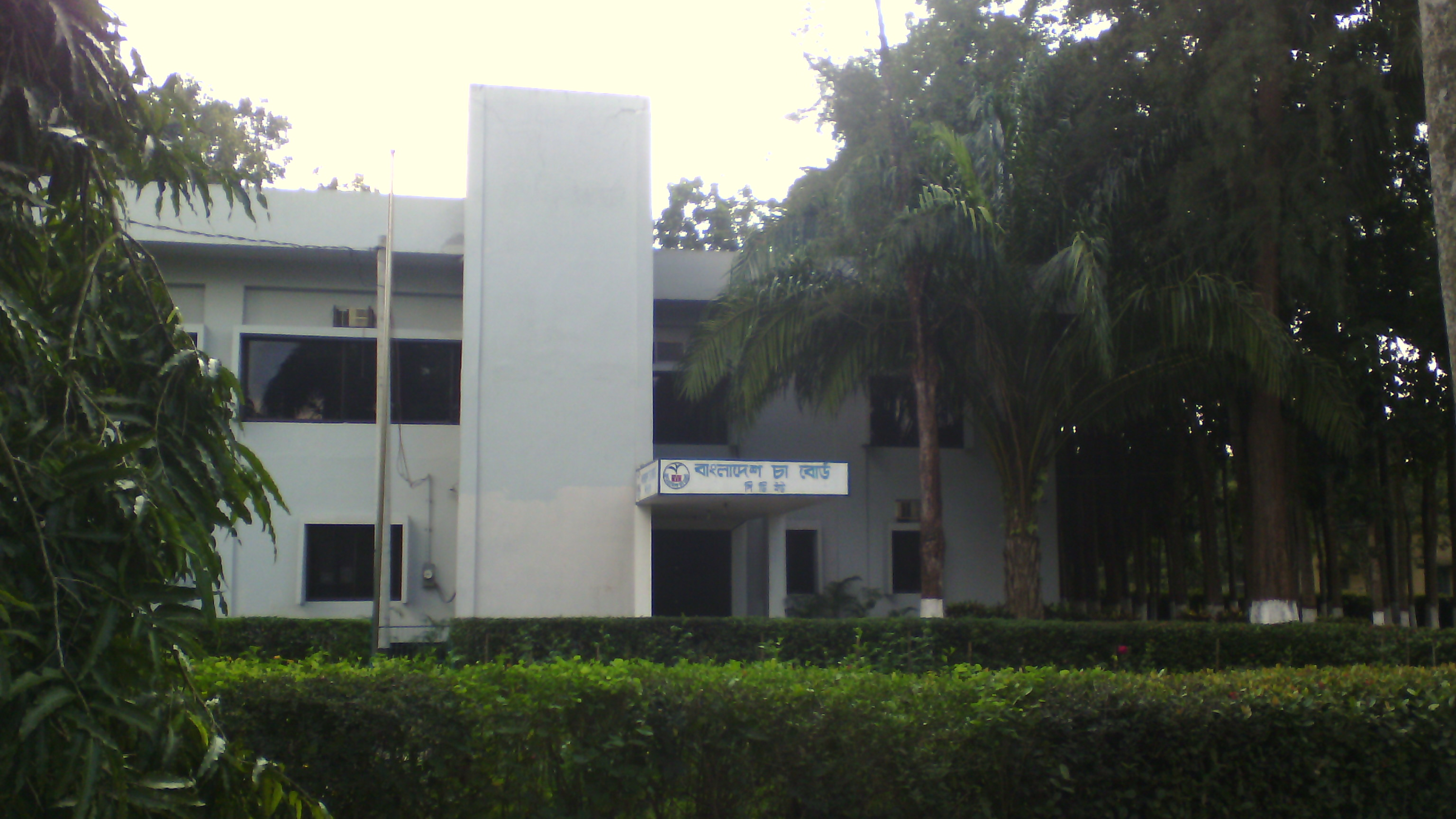
- Formation: 1977
- Headquarters: Chittagong, Bangladesh
- Region served: Bangladesh
- Official language: Bengali
- Chairman: Major General Md Mesbah Uddin Ahmed
- Parent organization: Ministry of Commerce
- Website: https://teaboard.gov.bd/

The Bangladesh Tea Board (BTB) is an autonomous body responsible for creating laws regarding tea production, controlling and encouraging the production of tea, and is located in Chittagong, Bangladesh. It is under the Ministry of Commerce.

== History ==
The Pakistan Tea Board was established in 1951 through the passage of the Pakistan Tea Act. The first president of Bangladesh, Sheikh Mujibur Rahman, was chairman of the board in 1957. The act was replaced with the Tea Ordinance in 1959.

After the independence of Bangladesh, the Bangladesh Tea Ordinance in 1977 created a three-member board and expanded to eleven with the Tea (Amendment) Ordinance in 1986.

The board was established through the Tea Ordinance in 1977. The board moved its headquarters from Dhaka to Chittagong in 1984.

In March 2018, Chairman Md Shafeenul Islam of the tea board was made head of Border Guard Bangladesh and was replaced with Major General Md Jahangir Al Mustahidur Rahman.

Three employees of the board received the National Integrity Award in 2022. It sought to increase the tea cess from 1 percent to 2 percent. The board helped tea production in Bangladesh reach a 168-year high.
