= New Model Degree College, Dhaka =

Coordinates: 23.7519°N 90.3784°E

New Model Degree College (NMDC) is a non-government masters level college in Dhanmondi, Dhaka, Bangladesh.

== Background ==
The enterprise of Noakhali Shanti established the New Model Degree College in 1969. At first, NMDC was located in the Green Road. After the war of 1971, the college was relocated to Dhanmondi Road 8 and house number 500. But it was damaged by war.

== Department ==
NMDC provides both HSC and graduation level education such as BA Honors, Masters, BBA and MBA. Also it has management, finance, accounting, marketing and social work department for the graduation level students. Also HSC level including humanities, business studies and science.
