= Director General of Border Guard Bangladesh =

- বর্ডার গার্ড বাংলাদেশের মহাপরিচালক
- Flag of BGB

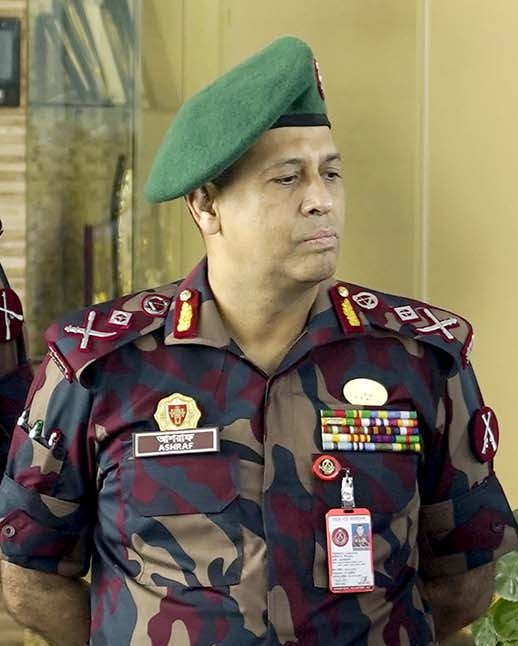
- Incumbent; Major General Mohammad Ashrafuzzaman Siddiqui since 30 January 2024
- Border Guard Bangladesh
- Type: BGB service chief
- Abbreviation: DG
- Member of: National Committee on Security Affairs
- Reports to: Chief Adviser; Ministry of Home Affairs
- Residence: DG Residence, Pilkhana
- Seat: Pilkhana, Bangladesh
- Appointer: Chief Adviser; on the advice of the Minister of Home Affairs
- Term length: 4 years
- Constituting instrument: Border Guard Bangladesh Act, 2010
- Precursor: Director General of Bangladesh Rifles
- Inaugural holder: Chitta Ranjan Datta
- Formation: 31 July 1972; 54 years ago
- Deputy: Additional Director General (ADG)
- Salary: ৳113000 (US$920) per month (incl. allowances)
- Website: bgb.gov.bd

The Director General of Border Guard Bangladesh (DG) (Bengali: বর্ডার গার্ড বাংলাদেশের মহাপরিচালক, romanized: Bôrḍār Gārḍ Bāṅglādēśēr Mohāporicālok) is the professional head and highest-ranking officer of the Border Guard Bangladesh (BGB), the country’s border security force, formerly known as the Bangladesh Rifles. The Director General is responsible for the overall command, administration, operational readiness, and strategic planning of the force, including safeguarding Bangladesh’s borders and coordinating border security operations.

The office is held by a serving officer of the Bangladesh Army with the rank of Major general and is appointed by the Government of Bangladesh under the supervision of the Ministry of Home Affairs. The Director General also plays a key role in maintaining law and order along the borders, preventing smuggling and illegal crossings, and collaborating with other security agencies for national security. The Director General functions from BGB Headquarters, which is located in Pilkhana, Bangladesh.

== Director generals ==
No.	Name	Image	Start of Term	End of Term	Length of Term	Ref.
1	Major General Chitta Ranjan Datta		31 July 1972	21 February 1974	1 year, 205 days	
2	Major General M Khalilur Rahman		22 February 1974	31 October 1975	1 year, 251 days	
3	Major General Quazi Golam Dastgir		1 November 1975	14 December 1977	2 years, 43 days	
4	Major General Muhammad Atiqur Rahman		15 December 1977	30 June 1982	4 years, 197 days	
5	Major General R A M Golam Muktadir		1 July 1982	16 July 1985	3 years, 15 days	
6	Major General Sofi Ahmed Chowdhury		17 July 1985	30 June 1988	2 years, 349 days	
7	Major General Sadiqur Rahman Chowdhury		1 July 1988	23 September 1990	2 years, 84 days	
8	Major General Mohammad Abdul Latif		24 September 1990	8 June 1992	1 year, 258 days	
9	Major General Mohammad Anwar Hossain		10 June 1992	11 February 1995	2 years, 246 days	
10	Major General Ejaz Ahmed Chowdhury		12 February 1995	18 July 1996	1 year, 157 days	
11	Major General Mohammad Azizur Rahman		25 August 1996	30 December 1999	3 years, 127 days	
12	Major General A. L. M. Fazlur Rahman		29 February 2000	11 July 2001	1 year, 133 days	
13	Major General Mohammad Abu Ishaque Ibrahim		12 July 2001	1 December 2001	142 days	
14	Major General Rezaqul Haider		1 December 2001	21 January 2003	1 year, 51 days	
15	Major General Md Jahangir Alam Choudhury		21 January 2003	18 February 2006	3 years, 28 days	
16	Major General Shakil Ahmed		19 February 2006	25 February 2009	3 years, 6 days	
17	Major General Mainul Islam		28 February 2009	9 May 2010	1 year, 70 days	
18	Major General Md Rafiqul Islam		9 May 2010	30 June 2011	1 year, 52 days	
19	Major General Anwar Hussain		30 June 2011	5 December 2012	1 year, 158 days	
20	Major General Aziz Ahmed		5 December 2012	1 November 2016	3 years, 332 days	
21	Major General Abul Hossain		2 November 2016	8 March 2018	1 year, 126 days	
22	Major General Shafeenul Islam		20 March 2018	28 February 2022	3 years, 345 days	
23	Major General Shakil Ahmed		2 March 2022	17 January 2023	321 days	
24	Major General Nazmul Hasan		18 January 2023	30 January 2024	1 year, 12 days	
25	Major General Mohammad Ashrafuzzaman Siddiqui		5 February 2024	Incumbent	2 years, 273 days	
