= Shakil Ahmed (cricketer) =

Pakistani cricketer (born 1966)

Personal information
- Full name: Shakil Ahmed
- Born: 12 February 1966 (age 60); Kuwait City, Kuwait
- Batting: Left-handed
- Bowling: Slow left-arm orthodox

International information
- National side: Pakistan
- Only Test (cap 154): 22 October 1998 v Australia

Career statistics
Competition	Test	First-class
Matches	1	109
Runs scored	1	1,274
Batting average	1.00	13.27
100s/50s	0/0	0/1
Top score	1	66
Balls bowled	325	19,724
Wickets	4	365
Bowling average	34.75	22.91
5 wickets in innings	0	23
10 wickets in match	0	4
Best bowling	4/91	7/69
Catches/stumpings	1/–	48/–
- Source: ESPNCricinfo, 11 June 2017

Shakil Ahmed (born 12 February 1966) is a former Pakistani cricketer who played in one Test match in 1998. A slow left-arm orthodox bowler, Shakeel took 365 wickets at an average of 22 in his first-class career, but only played one Test, in which he claimed four wickets. He was born at Kuwait City.

== See also ==
- List of Test cricketers born in non-Test playing nations
